= Anne-Sophie Barthet =

French alpine skier

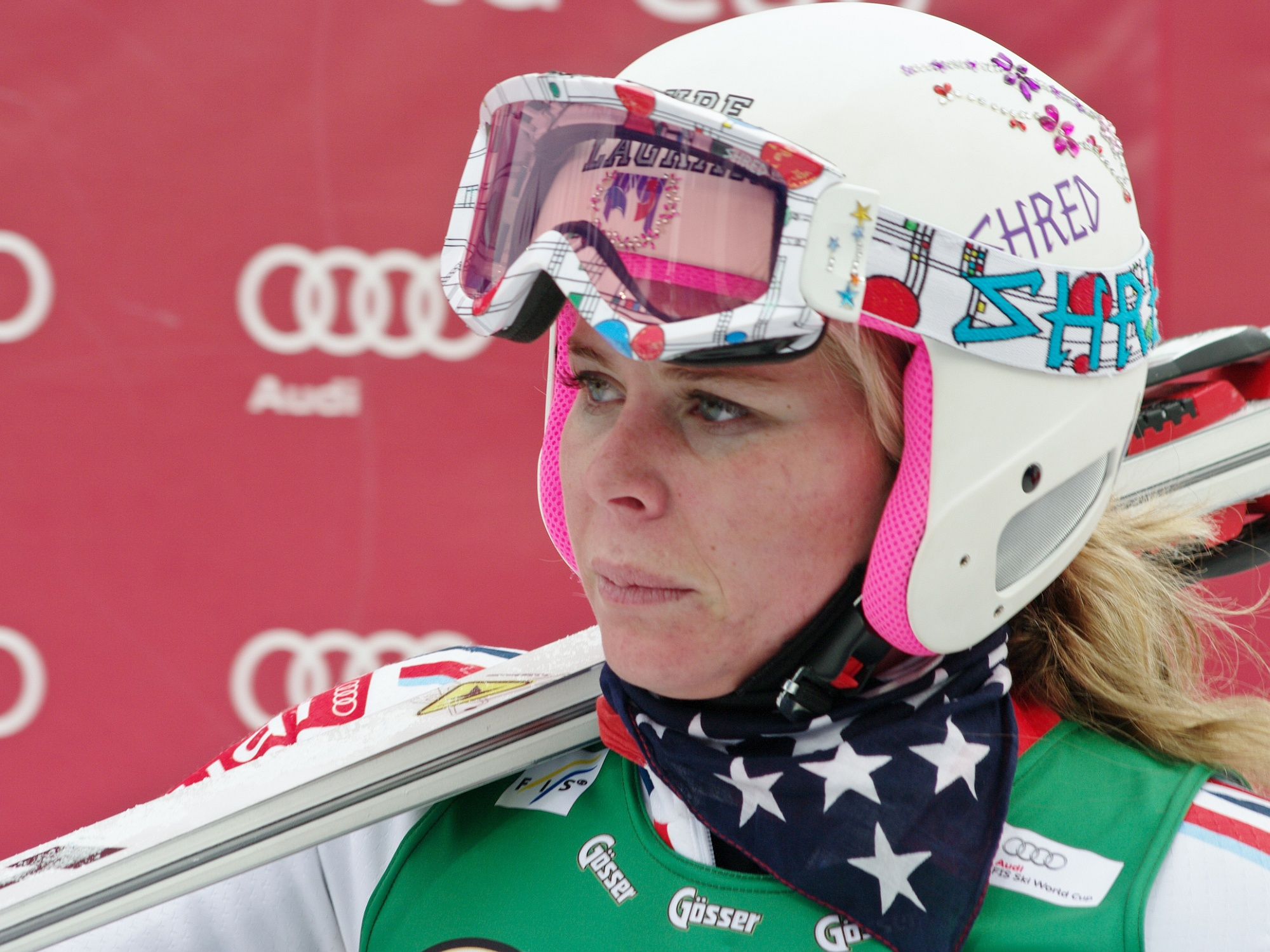
- At Semmering in 2010

Personal information
- Born: 23 February 1988 (age 38) Toulouse, Haute-Garonne, France
- Height: 1.71 m (5 ft 7 in)
- Website: annesophiebarthet.com

Skiing career
- Sport: Alpine skiing
- Club: EMHM-C.S. Courchevel
- Disciplines: Slalom, combined, Giant slalom, super-G
- World Cup debut: 22 October 2005 (age 17)

Olympics
- Teams: 4 – (2006–2018)
- Medals: 0

World Championships
- Teams: 5 – (2007, 2011, 2013, 2017, 2019)
- Medals: 0

World Cup
- Seasons: 14 – (2006–19)
- Wins: 0
- Podiums: 1 – (1 SC)
- Overall titles: 0 – (32nd in 2016)
- Discipline titles: 0 – (5th in AC, 2016)

Anne-Sophie Barthet (born 23 February 1988) is a French World Cup alpine ski racer and soldier. She competed for France at four Winter Olympics and five World Championships.

Born in Toulouse, Haute-Garonne, Barthet made her World Cup debut at age 17 in October 2005. Her best Olympic result is fourteenth in the giant slalom in 2014. She has eleven top tens on the World Cup (six in slalom, four in combined, and one in giant slalom), with her best result being a third place podium finish in combined at Soldeu in 2016.

In the downhill at Aspen in December 2007, Barthet dislocated her knee in a heavy fall, and was out of competition for eleven months. At the 2018 Winter Olympics, she was injured in a fall twenty minutes prior to the combined event, and fractured her fibula, which kept her out of competition for eight months. Barthet was selected for the 2019 World Championships, despite not obtaining a result from her two World Cup starts in late January; she secured a start in the combined competition after a victory in a combined race on the Europa Cup circuit in early December. In an interview at the World Championships, she said that they would be her last, although she had not decided the exact date of her retirement.

== World Cup results ==
=== Season standings ===
Season	Age	Overall	Slalom	Giant slalom	Super-G	Downhill	Combined
2006	17	92	36	—	—	—	35
2007	18	83	37	—	—	—	23
2008	19	118	—	50	—	—	—
2009	20	—	—	—	—	—	—
2010	21	75	31	34	—	—	—
2011	22	71	28	45	—	—	—
2012	23	48	22	36	—	—	23
2013	24	48	30	26	—	—	21
2014	25	70	32	36	—	—	—
2015	26	72	33	43	—	—	20
2016	27	32	15	41	—	—	5
2017	28	71	30	44	—	—	18
2018	29	82	—	—	47	—	16
2019	30	No World Cup points					

Standings through 3 February 2019

=== Race podiums ===
- 1 podium – (1 SC); 11 top tens

Season	Date	Location	Discipline	Place
2016	28 Feb 2016	Soldeu, Andorra	Super combined	3rd

== World Championship results ==
Year	Age	Slalom	Giant slalom	Super-G	Downhill	Combined
2007	18	19	—	DNF	—	22
2009	20	—	—	—	—	—
2011	22	14	19	—	—	—
2013	24	24	20	—	—	16
2015	26	—	—	—	—	—
2017	28	23	—	—	—	12
2019	30	—	—	—	—	11

== Olympic results ==
Year	Age	Slalom	Giant slalom	Super-G	Downhill	Combined
2006	17	34	—	—	—	DNF1
2010	21	26	—	—	—	—
2014	25	18	14	—	—	—
2018	29	—	—	—	—	DNS1
