= Chiara Costazza =

Italian alpine skier

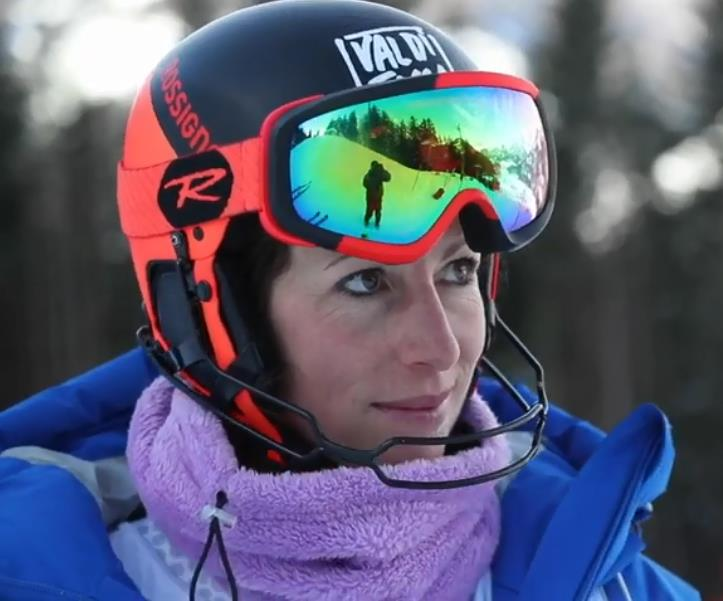
- Costazza in 2019.

Personal information
- Born: 6 May 1984 (age 42) Cavalese, Trentino, Italy
- Height: 1.72 m (5 ft 8 in)

Skiing career
- Sport: Alpine skiing
- Club: GS Fiamme Oro
- Disciplines: Slalom, giant slalom
- World Cup debut: 22 December 2002 (age 18)

Olympics
- Teams: 4 – (2006–2018)
- Medals: 0

World Championships
- Teams: 6 – (2005–07, 2013–19)
- Medals: 0

World Cup
- Seasons: 15
- Wins: 1 – (1 SL)
- Podiums: 2 – (2 SL)
- Overall titles: 0 – (27th in 2008)
- Discipline titles: 0 – (7th in SL, 2008)

Chiara Costazza (born 6 May 1984) is an Italian former World Cup alpine ski racer, who specialized in slalom.

Born in Cavalese, Trentino, Costazza resides in Pozza di Fassa. She won one World Cup race, a slalom, in December 2007 at Lienz, Austria, and competed in four Winter Olympics and six World Championships.

== World Cup results ==
=== Season standings ===
Season	Age	Overall	Slalom	Giant Slalom	Super G	Downhill	Combined
2005	20	90	40	—	—	—	—
2006	21	37	12	—	—	—	—
2007	22	50	13	—	—	—	—
2008	23	27	7	—	—	—	—
2009	24	108	48	—	—	—	—
2010	25	66	22	—	—	—	—
2011	26	114	51	—	—	—	—
2012	27	95	39	—	—	—	—
2013	28	69	28	—	—	—	—
2014	29	50	17	—	—	—	—
2015	30	43	15	—	—	—	—
2016	31	68	24	—	—	—	—
2017	32	40	9	—	—	—	—
2018	33	52	19	—	—	—	—
2019	34	48	16	—	—	—	—

Standings through 16 February 2019

=== Race podiums ===
- 1 win – (1 SL)
- 2 podiums – (2 SL); 32 top tens

Season	Date	Location	Discipline	Race
2007	10 Nov 2007	Reiteralm, Austria	Slalom	3rd
2007	29 Dec 2007	Lienz, Austria	Slalom	1st

== World Championship results ==
Year	Age	Slalom	Giant slalom	Super-G	Downhill	Combined
2005	20	DNF2	—	—	—	—
2007	22	DNF2	—	—	—	—
2009	24	Injured: did not compete				
2011	26	—	—	—	—	—
2013	28	14	—	—	—	—
2015	30	16	—	—	—	—
2017	32	DNF1	—	—	—	—
2019	34	20	—	—	—	—

== Olympic results ==
Year	Age	Slalom	Giant slalom	Super-G	Downhill	Combined
2006	21	8	—	—	—	—
2010	25	DNF2	—	—	—	—
2014	29	DNF2	—	—	—	—
2018	33	9	—	—	—	—
