= Irene Curtoni =

Italian alpine skier

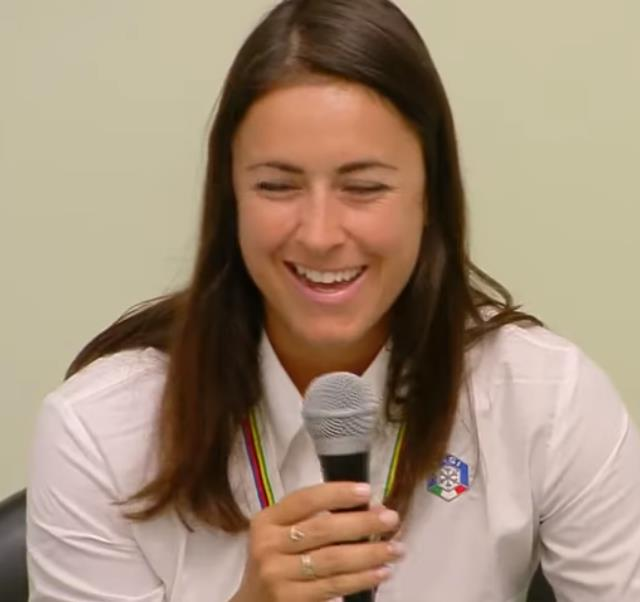
- Curtoni in 2019 at Palazzo Chigi.

Personal information
- Born: 11 August 1985 (age 40) Échirolles, Isère, France
- Height: 1.70 m (5 ft 7 in)
- Family: Elena Curtoni (sister)

Skiing career
- Country: Italy
- Sport: Alpine skiing
- Club: C.S. Esercito
- Disciplines: Giant slalom, slalom
- World Cup debut: 29 December 2007 (age 22)

Olympics
- Teams: 1 – (2018)
- Medals: 0

World Championships
- Teams: 5 – (2009–13, 2017, 2019)
- Medals: 1 (team) (0 gold)

World Cup
- Seasons: 13 – (2009–2021)
- Wins: 0
- Podiums: 2 – (1 GS, 1 PS)
- Overall titles: 0 – (16th in 2012)
- Discipline titles: 0 – (8th in GS, 2012)
Medal record
Women's alpine skiing
Representing Italy
World Championships
Bronze medal – third place	2019 Åre	Team event
World Military Games
Gold medal – first place	2017 Sochi	Slalom

Irene Curtoni (born 11 August 1985) is an Italian former World Cup alpine ski racer. She was specialised in the technical events of giant slalom and slalom.

Born in Échirolles, Isère, France, where her father was a ski instructor, Curtoni was raised in the province of Sondrio in Lombardy, Italy. Whilst growing up, she also competed in basketball, gymnastics and swimming before settling on skiing. She made her World Cup debut in December 2007, and her best result is a third place in giant slalom in March 2012 in Ofterschwang, Germany. Through December 2020, Curtoni has two World Cup podiums and 32 top ten finishes; she has represented Italy in five World Championships and the 2018 Winter Olympics, where she was tenth in the slalom and part of the Italian squad which finished fifth in the team event.

She won a bronze medal in the team event at the World Championships in 2019.

In 2021 she announced her retirement from the ski competitions. Since 2021 she is working as a technical commentator for alpine ski races at the Swiss-Italian television.

Her younger sister is alpine ski racer Elena Curtoni (b.1991).

== World Cup results ==
=== Season standings ===
Season
Season	Age	Overall	Slalom	Giant slalom	Super-G	Downhill	Combined
2009	23	72	29	39	—	—	—
2010	24	83	53	25	—	—	—
2011	25	52	26	26	—	—	—
2012	26	16	18	8	—	—	—
2013	27	22	19	9	—	—	—
2014	28	—	—	—	—	—	—
2015	29	38	26	12	—	—	—
2016	30	38	16	16	—	—	—
2017	31	38	18	25	—	—	—
2018	32	22	11	18	—	—	—
2019	33	32	10	24	—	—	—
2020	34	43	14	33	—	—	—
2021	35	44	14	—	—	—	—

=== Race podiums ===
- 2 podiums – (1 GS, 1 PS); 32 top tens

Season
Season	Date	Location	Discipline	Place
2012	2 March 2012	Ofterschwang, Germany	Giant slalom	3rd
2018	20 December 2017	Courchevel, France	Parallel slalom	3rd

== World Championship results ==
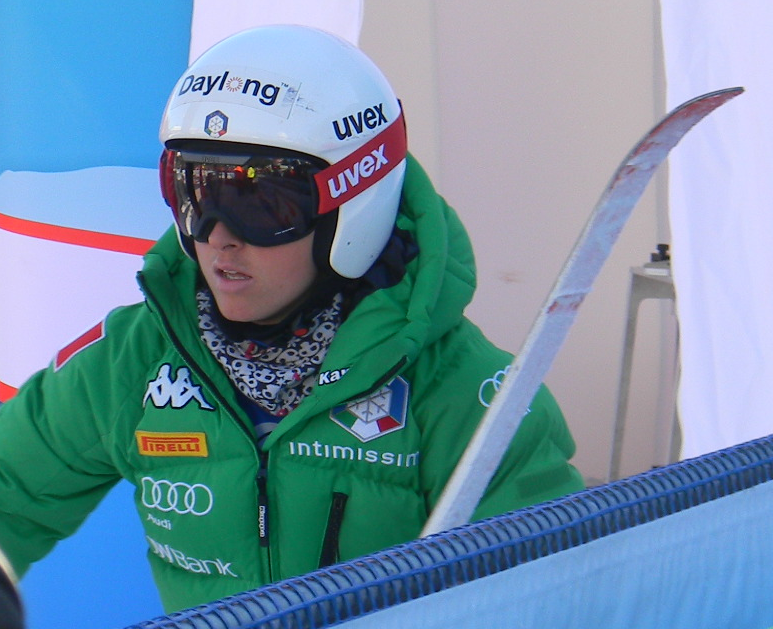
Curtoni in December 2015

Year
Year	Age	Slalom	Giant slalom	Super-G	Downhill	Combined	Team event
2009	23	DSQ2	—	—	—	—	—
2011	25	11	27	—	—	—	—
2013	27	DNF1	14	—	—	—	—
2015	29	—	—	—	—	—	—
2017	31	DNF1	—	—	—	—	QF
2019	33	DNF1	—	—	—	—	3
2021	35	18	—	—	—	—	—

== Olympic results ==
Year
Year	Age	Slalom	Giant slalom	Super-G	Downhill	Combined	Team event
2018	32	10	—	—	—	—	5
