= Stacey Cook =

American alpine skier

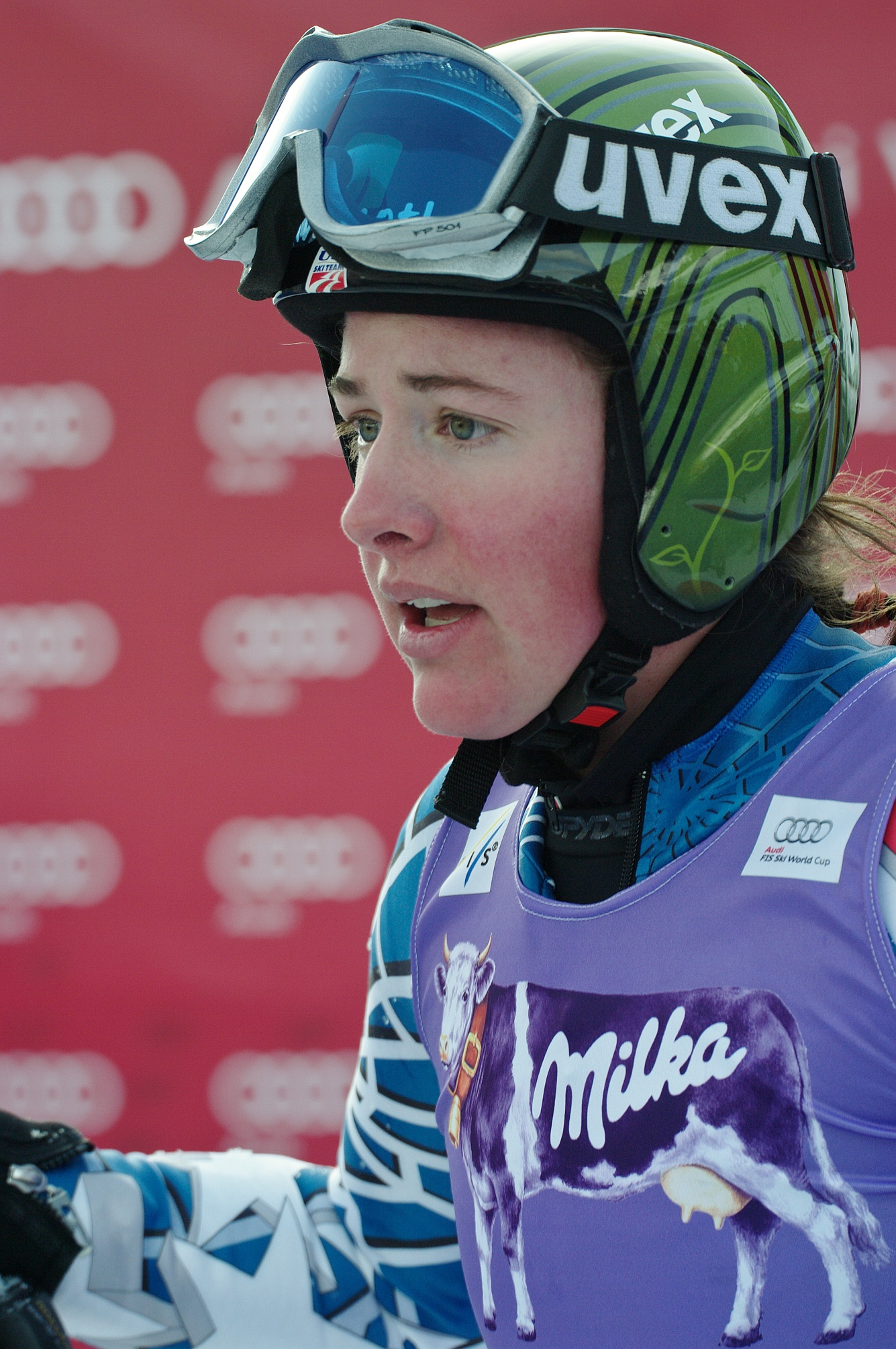
- Cook in January 2011

Personal information
- Born: July 3, 1984 (age 42) Truckee, California, U.S.
- Height: 5 ft 5 in (165 cm)
- Website: staceycook.net

Skiing career
- Sport: Alpine skiing
- Club: Mammoth Mountain; Ski Team
- Disciplines: Downhill, Super G
- World Cup debut: January 30, 2004 (age 19)

Olympics
- Teams: 3 – (2006, 2010, 2014)
- Medals: 0

World Championships
- Teams: 6 – (2007–17)
- Medals: 0

World Cup
- Seasons: 12th – (2006–17)
- Wins: 0
- Podiums: 3 – (3 DH)
- Overall titles: 0 – (28th in 2014)
- Discipline titles: 0 – (4th in DH, 2013)

Stacey Janelle Cook (born July 3, 1984) is a World Cup alpine ski racer from the United States, and specializes in the speed events.

== Racing career ==
Born in Truckee, California, Cook started skiing at age 4 with her father at various Lake Tahoe ski areas and raced in the learn-to-race Buddy Werner League events run by the Truckee-Donner Recreation and Park District. She has competed in two Olympics and four World Championships. Cook made her first two World Cup podiums in late 2012 in consecutive downhills at Lake Louise, Canada.

Cook is based in Mammoth Lakes, California.

=== Career highlights ===
- 2005 – NorAm super G runner-up with two wins
- 2006 – Competed in first Winter Olympics; 19th in downhill and 23rd in giant slalom.
  - U.S. super G champion
- 2007 – competed in first World Championships, 16th in downhill.
- 2009 – World Championships, 9th in downhill.
- 2010 – Winter Olympics, 11th in downhill.
- 2012 – Finished tenth in the World Cup downhill standings; five top-ten finishes in downhill
- 2013 – Finished Fourth in the World Cup Downhill Standing
- 2023 - Married David Gill

== World Cup results ==
=== Season standings ===
Season	Age	Overall	Slalom	Giant Slalom	Super G	Downhill	Combined
2006	21	54	—	41	51	25	—
2007	22	38	—	—	29	21	24
2008	23	48	—	54	21	39	23
2009	24	110	—	—	—	43	42
2010	25	56	—	—	49	17	39
2011	26	45	—	—	32	19	32
2012	27	41	—	—	41	10	—
2013	28	31	—	—	34	4	—
2014	29	28	—	—	15	18	—
2015	30	34	—	—	29	14	—
2016	31	37	—	—	26	15	40
2017	32	53	—	—	54	14	45
2018	33	59	—	—	—	19	—

- Standings through 4 February 2018

=== Podiums ===
- 3 podiums – (3 DH)

Season	Date	Location	Discipline	Place
2013	30 Nov 2012	Lake Louise, Canada	Downhill	2nd
2013	1 Dec 2012	Lake Louise, Canada	Downhill	2nd
2015	6 Dec 2014	Lake Louise, Canada	Downhill	2nd

== World Championship results ==
Year	Age	Slalom	Giant Slalom	Super-G	Downhill	Combined
2007	22	—	—	—	16	—
2009	24	—	—	22	9	16
2011	26	—	—	DNF	25	—
2013	28	—	—	—	6	18
2015	30	—	—	13	19	—
2017	32	—	—	—	—	22

== Olympic results ==
Year	Age	Slalom	Giant Slalom	Super-G	Downhill	Combined
2006	21	—	23	—	19	—
2010	25	—	—	—	11	—
2014	29	—	—	DNF	17	DNF1

== Off the slopes ==
On July 13, 2010, Cook toured the oil-stained areas of Louisiana devastated by the BP Oil Spill as part of a Sierra Club-sponsored event involving 10 current and former athletes, which included NASCAR racer Leilani Munter, tennis star Chanda Rubin and NFL stars Ovie Mughelli and Mike Alstott
