= Dominique Gisin =

Swiss alpine skier (born 1985)

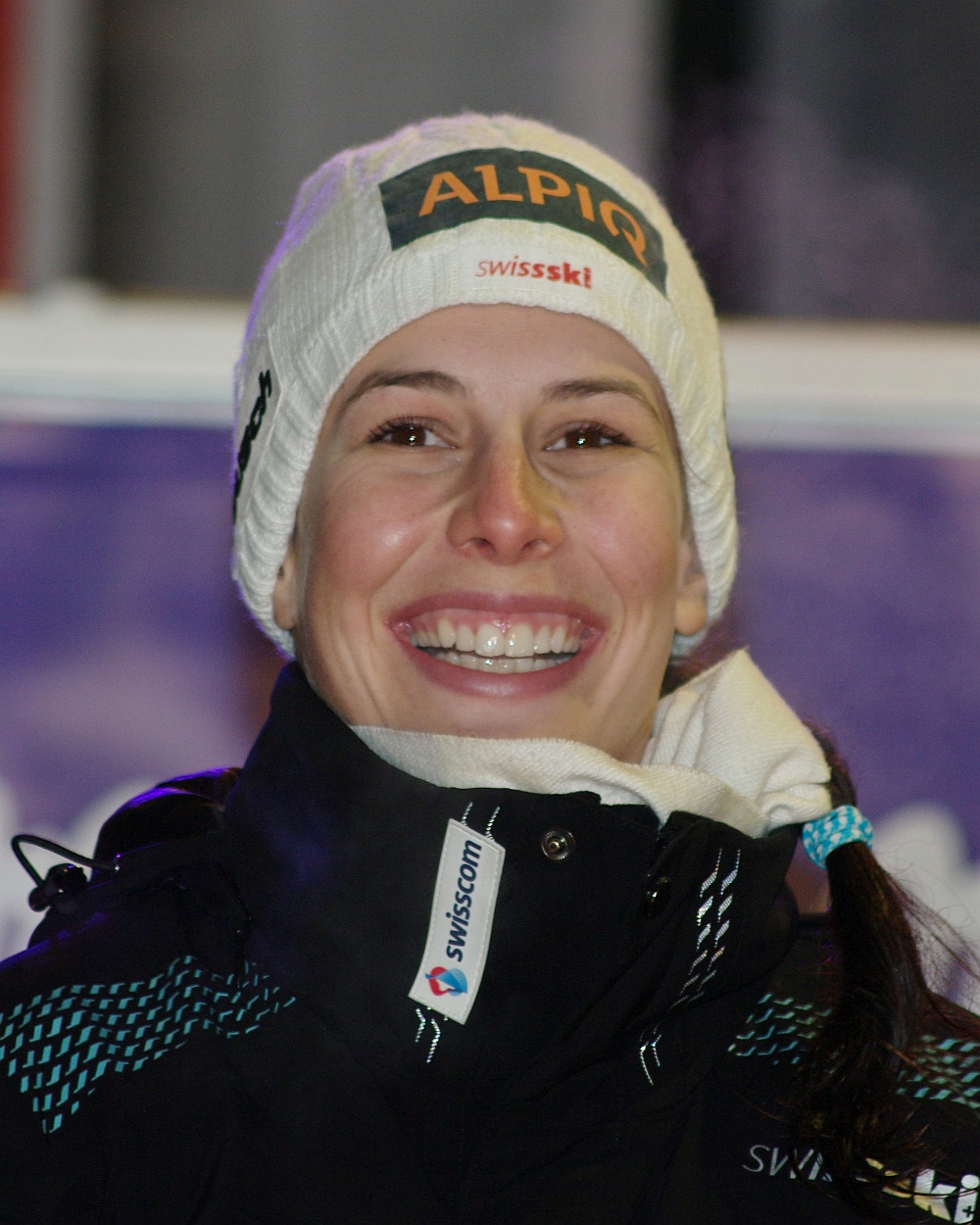
- Gisin in January 2011

Personal information
- Born: 4 June 1985 (age 41) Visp, Switzerland
- Height: 172 cm (5 ft 8 in)
- Website: dominiquegisin.ch

Skiing career
- Sport: Alpine skiing
- Club: Engelberg
- Retired: 19 March 2015 (age 29)
- Disciplines: Downhill, super-G, giant slalom, slalom, combined
- World Cup debut: 2 December 2005 (age 20)

Olympics
- Teams: 2 – (2010, 2014)
- Medals: 1 (1 gold)

World Championships
- Teams: 5 – (2007–15)
- Medals: 0

World Cup
- Seasons: 10 – (2006–2015)
- Wins: 3 – (2 DH, 1 SG)
- Podiums: 7 – (5 DH, 2 SG)
- Overall titles: 0 – (11th in 2014)
- Discipline titles: 0 – (4th in DH, 2009)
Medal record
Women's alpine skiing
Representing Switzerland
Olympic Games
Gold medal – first place	2014 Sochi	Downhill

Dominique Gisin (German pronunciation: ['gɪzɪn]; born 4 June 1985) is a retired World Cup alpine ski racer and Olympic gold medalist from Switzerland. She is the older sister of alpine ski racers Marc and Michelle Gisin.

== Career ==
Born in Visp in the canton of Valais, Gisin made her World Cup debut in December 2005. Her first podium was in Altenmarkt-Zauchensee, Austria, where she placed second in the downhill on 13 January 2007. Two years later in January 2009, she gained her first World Cup victory, also a downhill at Altenmarkt-Zauchensee, with the same time as Anja Pärson.

At the Winter Olympics in 2014, she tied for first in the downhill with Tina Maze and both were awarded gold medals. It was the first-ever tie for gold in an alpine event at the Olympics, though several times previously competitors have tied for second, so that two silver medals were awarded (and no bronze). As a result, Gisin was named as Swiss Sportswoman of the Year for 2014.

Through March 2014, Gisin has 3 World Cup victories, 7 podiums, and 42 top ten finishes. Her younger siblings Marc and Michelle also compete as alpine ski racers.

In March 2015 Gisin announced her retirement from competition at the World Cup Finals meeting at Méribel.

Away from skiing, Gisin learned to fly as a teenager and joined the Swiss Air Force to train as a fighter pilot, before being released due to knee injuries incurred through her skiing career.

== World Cup results ==
=== Season standings ===
Season	Age	Overall	Slalom	Giant slalom	Super-G	Downhill	Combined
2007	21	34	–	–	–	10	38
2008	22	47	–	–	44	26	25
2009	23	21	–	–	44	4	19
2010	24	24	–	–	12	14	28
2011	25	17	–	–	6	9	11
2012	26	25	–	31	22	12	—
2013	27	15	54	10	15	19	24
2014	28	11	–	15	12	9	14
2015	29	16	–	19	14	16	6

=== Race podiums ===
- 3 wins – (2 DH, 1 SG)
- 7 podiums – (5 DH, 2 SG)

Season	Date	Location	Discipline	Place
2007	13 Jan 2007	Zauchensee, Austria	Downhill	2nd
2009	18 Jan 2009	Zauchensee, Austria	Downhill	1st
2009	24 Jan 2009	Cortina d'Ampezzo, Italy	Downhill	1st
2010	7 Mar 2010	Crans-Montana, Switzerland	Super-G	1st
2011	4 Dec 2010	Lake Louise, Canada	Downhill	3rd
2011	9 Jan 2011	Zauchensee, Austria	Super-G	3rd
2012	2 Dec 2011	Lake Louise, Canada	Downhill	3rd

== World Championship results ==
Year	Age	Slalom	Giant slalom	Super-G	Downhill	Combined
2007	21	—	—	—	5	DNF
2009	23	—	—	—	DNF	—
2011	25	—	—	DNF	8	4
2013	27	—	DNF1	10	DNF	10
2015	29	—	19	—	—	—

== Olympic results ==
Year	Age	Slalom	Giant slalom	Super-G	Downhill	Combined
2010	24	—	—	—	DNF	—
2014	28	—	10	DNF	1	5

== See also ==
- List of Olympic medalist families

Awards and achievements
Preceded by Giulia Steingruber	Swiss Sportswoman of the Year; 2014	Succeeded by Daniela Ryf
