= Johanna Schnarf =

Italian alpine skier

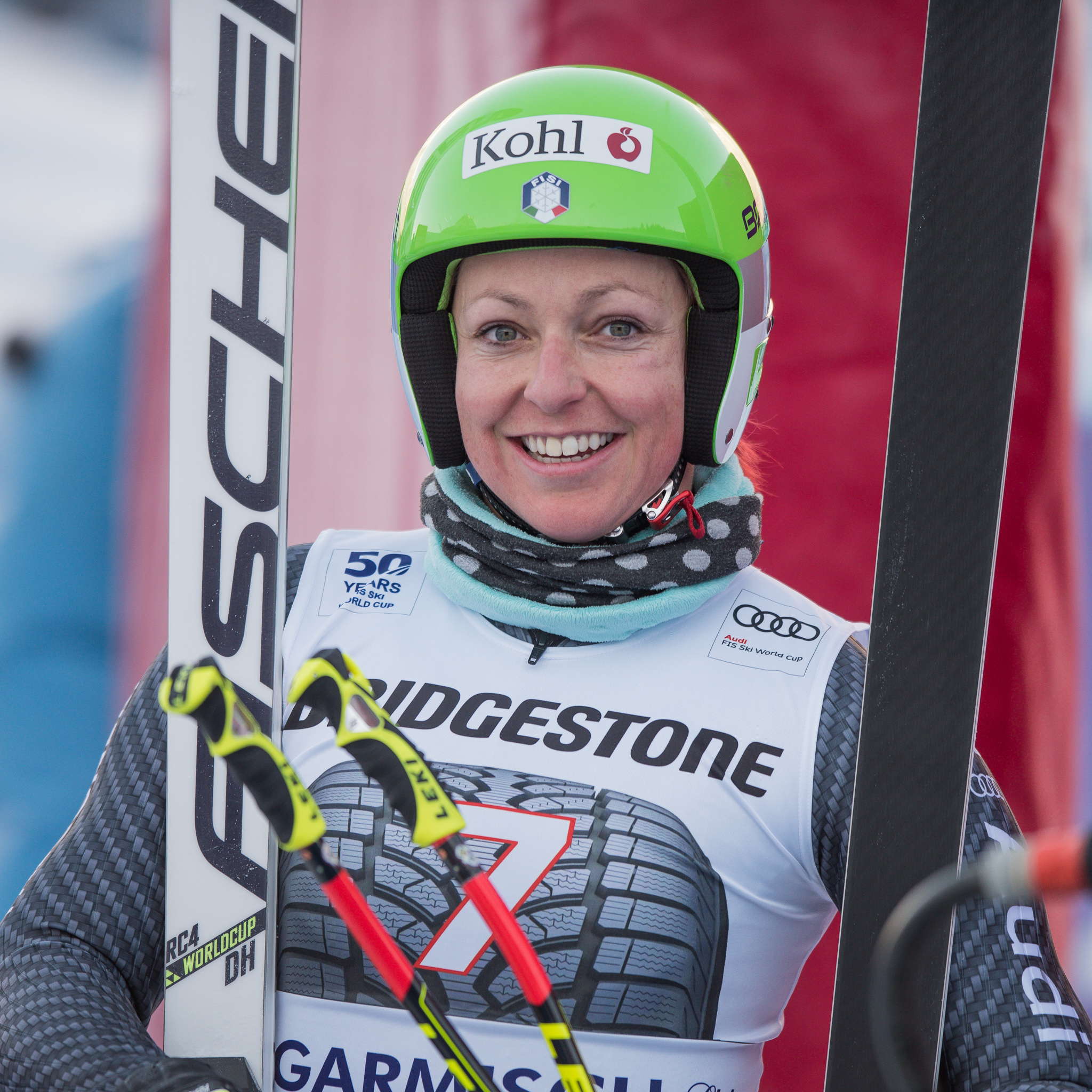
- Schnarf in January 2017

Personal information
- Born: 16 September 1984 (age 41) Brixen, South Tyrol, Italy
- Height: 172 cm (5 ft 8 in)

Skiing career
- Sport: Alpine skiing
- Club: G.S. Fiamme Gialle
- Disciplines: Super-G, Downhill, Combined
- World Cup debut: 5 December 2004 (age 20)

Olympics
- Teams: 2 – (2010, 2018)
- Medals: 0

World Championships
- Teams: 5 – (2007–11, 2015–17)
- Medals: 0

World Cup
- Seasons: 13 – (2005–2012, 2014–2018)
- Wins: 0
- Podiums: 2 – (1 DH, 1 SG)
- Overall titles: 0 – (20th in 2018)
- Discipline titles: 0 – (7th in SC, 2016)

Johanna "Hanna" Schnarf (born 16 September 1984) is a World Cup alpine ski racer from Italy. She focuses on the speed events of super-G and downhill and also the combined.

== Biography ==
Born in Brixen, South Tyrol, Schnarf made her World Cup debut at age 20 in December 2004. She competed for Italy at the 2010 Winter Olympics and 2018 Winter Olympics, and finished fourth in the super-G, missing the bronze medal by 0.11 seconds, and was eighth in the combined. Schnarf has also raced in five world championships, with two top tens in the combined.

== World Cup results ==
=== Season standings ===
Season	Age	Overall	Slalom	Giant slalom	Super-G	Downhill	Combined
2006	21	83	—	—	47	—	16
2007	22	64	—	—	43	38	11
2008	23	75	—	—	49	48	17
2009	24	67	—	—	44	49	13
2010	25	28	—	—	34	13	9
2011	26	23	—	—	11	20	10
2012	27	27	—	—	18	14	16
2013	28						
2014	29	77	—	—	—	32	—
2015	30	54	—	—	37	24	15
2016	31	21	—	—	9	17	7
2017	32	22	—	—	17	5	15
2018	33	20	—	—	8	16	30

=== Race podiums ===
- 2 podiums – (1 DH, 1 SG)

Season	Date	Location	Discipline	Place
2010	6 Mar 2010	Crans-Montana, Switzerland	Downhill	2nd
2018	21 Jan 2018	Cortina d'Ampezzo, Italy	Super-G	2nd

== World Championship results ==
Year	Age	Slalom	Giant slalom	Super-G	Downhill	Combined
2007	22	—	—	17	—	17
2009	24	—	—	—	—	6
2011	26	—	—	23	21	8
2013	28	—	—	—	—	—
2015	30	—	—	—	28	DNS2
2017	32	—	—	—	22	—

== Olympic results ==
Year	Age	Slalom	Giant slalom	Super-G	Downhill	Combined
2010	25	—	—	4	22	8
2014	29					
2018	33	—	—	5	—	—
