= Marie Marchand-Arvier =

French alpine skier

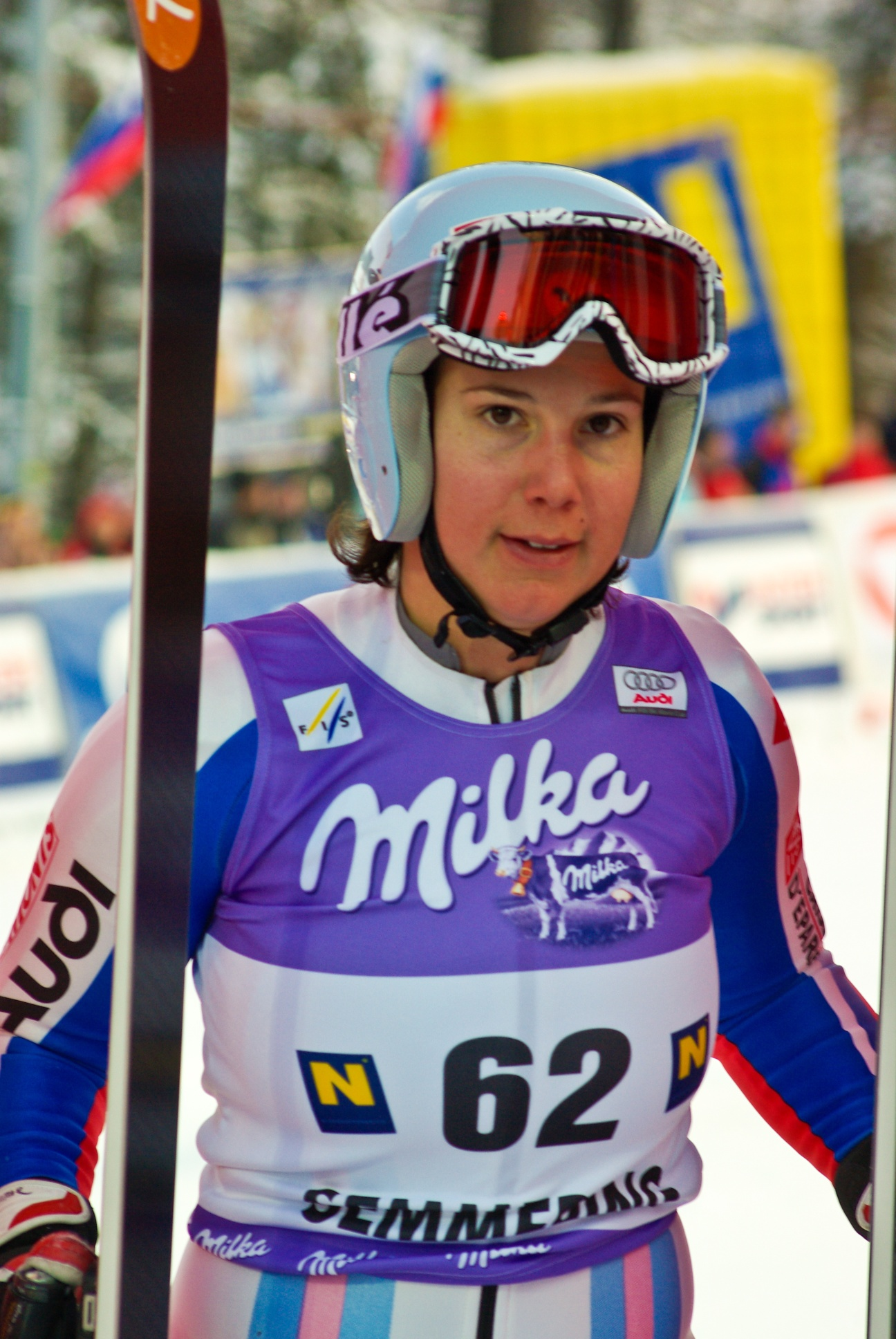
- Marchand-Arvier in December 2008

Personal information
- Born: 8 April 1985 (age 41) Laxou, Meurthe-et-Moselle, France
- Height: 164 cm (5 ft 5 in)
- Website: marie-ma.com

Skiing career
- Sport: Alpine skiing
- Retired: 19 March 2015 (age 29)
- Disciplines: Downhill, super-G, combined
- World Cup debut: 14 January 2004 (age 18)

Olympics
- Teams: 3 – (2006, 2010, 2014)
- Medals: 0

World Championships
- Teams: 5 – (2007–2015)
- Medals: 1 (0 gold)

World Cup
- Seasons: 11 – (2005–2015)
- Wins: 0
- Podiums: 5 – (4 DH, 1 SG)
- Overall titles: 0 – (16th in 2009)
- Discipline titles: 0 – (8th in DH, 2012)
Medal record
Women's alpine skiing
Representing France
World Championships
Silver medal – second place	2009 Val-d'Isère	Super-G

Marie Marchand-Arvier (born 8 April 1985) is a retired World Cup alpine ski racer from France. Born in Laxou, she won a silver medal in the super-G at the 2009 World Championships. She finished fifth in the combined, and sixth in the downhill.

Marchand-Arvier competed at the 2006 Winter Olympics in Turin, where her best result was 15th in the downhill. At the 2010 Olympics in Vancouver, she finished 7th in the downhill and tenth in the combined at Whistler Creekside.

Marchand-Arvier married former biathlete Vincent Jay in June 2014. In March 2015 she announced her retirement from competition.

== World cup results ==
=== Race podiums ===
- 5 podiums (4 downhill, 1 super-G)

Season	Date	Location	Discipline	Place
2007	20 Jan 2007	Cortina d'Ampezzo, Italy	Downhill	3rd
2007	14 Mar 2007	Lenzerheide, Switzerland	Downhill	3rd
2010	31 Jan 2010	St. Moritz, Switzerland	Super-G	2nd
2012	3 Dec 2011	Lake Louise, Canada	Downhill	2nd
2013	23 Feb 2013	Méribel, France	Downhill	3rd

=== Season standings ===
Season	Age	Overall	Slalom	Giant slalom	Super-G	Downhill	Combined
2005	19	96	—	—	—	45	—
2006	20	80	—	—	38	52	29
2007	21	27	—	—	35	9	17
2008	22	36	—	—	31	17	28
2009	23	16	—	55	12	11	8
2010	24	23	—	—	10	19	11
2011	25	31	—	—	18	18	32
2012	26	29	—	—	25	8	35
2013	27	28	—	—	24	14	21
2014	28	60	—	—	26	29	—
2015	29	58	—	—	25	29	—

== World Championship results ==
Year	Age	Slalom	Giant Slalom	Super-G	Downhill	Combined
2007	21	—	—	18	11	DNF
2009	23	—	—	2	6	5
2011	25	—	—	20	22	15
2013	27	—	—	14	14	—
2015	29	—	—	14	DNF	—

== Olympic results ==
Year	Age	Slalom	Giant Slalom	Super-G	Downhill	Combined
2006	20	—	—	25	15	18
2010	24	—	—	DNF	7	10
2014	28	—	—	DNF	DNF	—
