= Daniela Merighetti =

Italian alpine skier

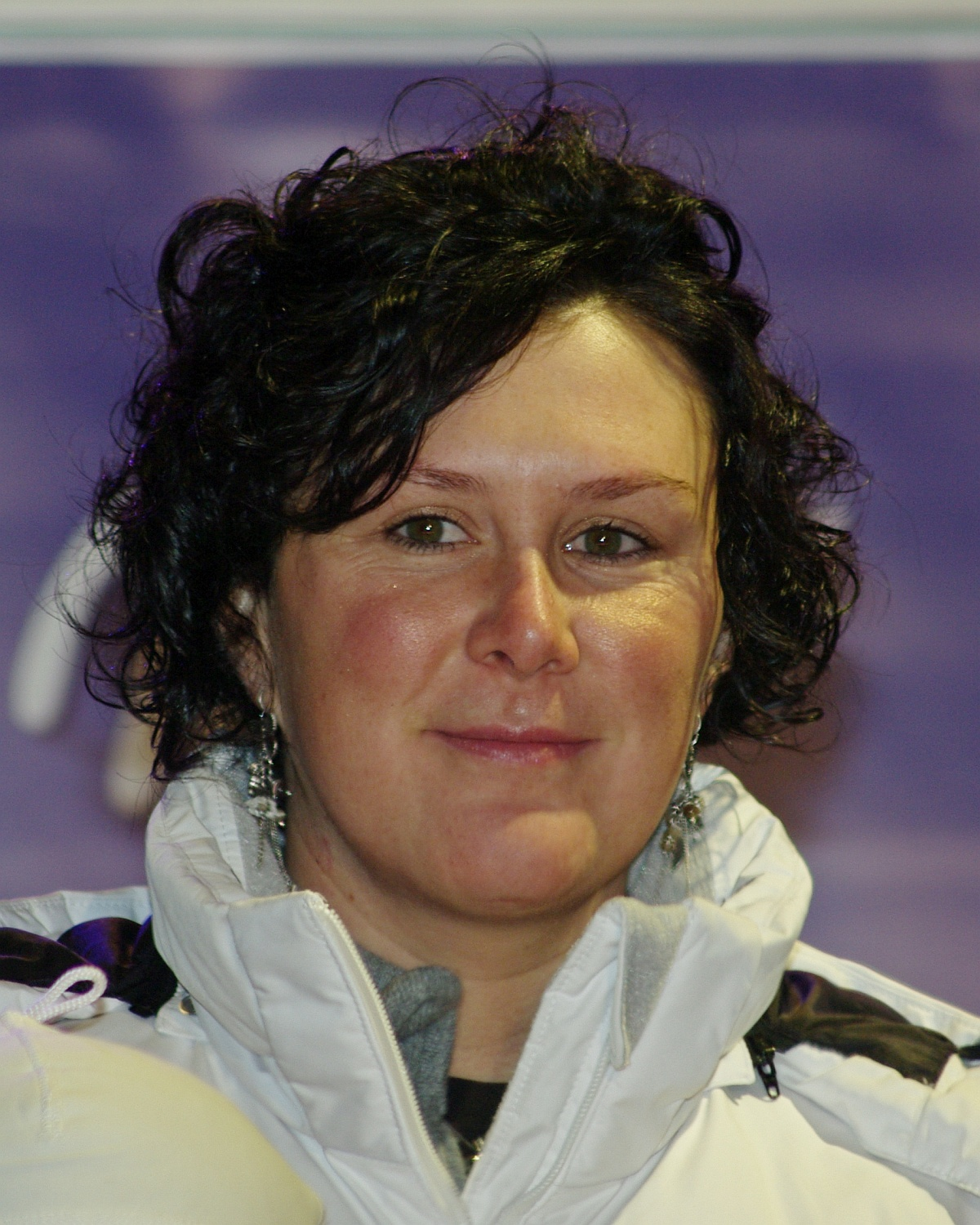
- Merighetti in 2011

Personal information
- Born: 5 July 1981 (age 45) Brescia, Lombardy, Italy
- Height: 168 cm (5 ft 6 in)
- Website: danielamerighetti.it

Skiing career
- Sport: Alpine skiing
- Club: G.S. Fiamme Gialle
- Disciplines: Downhill, super-G, combined
- World Cup debut: 9 December 2000 (age 19)

Olympics
- Teams: 3 – (2006, 2010, 2014)
- Medals: 0

World Championships
- Teams: 5 – (2007–15)
- Medals: 0

World Cup
- Seasons: 16 – (2001–16)
- Wins: 1 – (1 DH)
- Podiums: 6 – (4 DH, 1 SG, 1 GS)
- Overall titles: 0 – (15th in 2012)
- Discipline titles: 0 – (7th in DH, 2012, 2013)

Daniela Merighetti (born 5 July 1981) is a retired World Cup alpine ski racer from Italy. Born in Brescia, Lombardy, she competed in the World Cup, three Winter Olympics, and five World Championships.

In the 2010 Winter Olympics, Merighetti competed in the women's downhill, combined and super-G, but failed to finish. In the 2014 Winter Olympics, she competed in the women's downhill, where she came 4th, and super-G, where she failed to finish. She did not start in the combined.

She won her first World Cup race in 2012 at age 30, in the downhill at Cortina d'Ampezzo in Italy on 14 January. It was her second World Cup podium, nearly nine years after her first in 2003.

== World Cup results ==
=== Season standings ===
Season	Age	Overall	Slalom	Giant slalom	Super-G	Downhill	Combined
2003	21	59	42	24	—	—	—
2004	22	91	—	33	—	—	—
2005	23	—	—	—	—	—	—
2006	24	53	—	48	43	27	19
2007	25	48	42	—	48	22	32
2008	26	44	—	—	45	21	31
2009	27	32	—	—	41	14	10
2010	28	36	—	—	43	8	34
2011	29	20	—	—	29	10	12
2012	30	15	—	—	12	7	27
2013	31	30	—	—	29	7	29
2014	32	41	—	—	29	20	—
2015	33	35	—	—	23	19	—
2016	34	58	—	—	31	22	—

=== Race podiums ===
- 1 win – (1 DH)
- 6 podiums – (4 DH, 1 SG, 1 GS)

Season	Date	Location	Discipline	Place
2003	6 Mar 2003	Åre, Sweden	Giant slalom	2nd
2012	14 Jan 2012	Cortina d'Ampezzo, Italy	Downhill	1st
2012	26 Feb 2012	Bansko, Bulgaria	Super-G	3rd
2013	12 Jan 2013	St. Anton, Austria	Downhill	2nd
2015	18 Jan 2015	Cortina d'Ampezzo, Italy	Downhill	3rd
2016	20 Feb 2016	La Thuile, Italy	Downhill	3rd

== World Championship results ==
Year	Age	Slalom	Giant slalom	Super-G	Downhill	Combined
2007	25	—	—	—	17	15
2009	27	—	—	DNF1	16	DNF2
2011	29	—	—	9	7	DNF1
2013	31	—	—	7	DNF1	DNS2
2015	33	—	—	DNF1	8	—

== Olympic results ==
Year	Age	Slalom	Giant slalom	Super-G	Downhill	Combined
2006	24	DNF1	—	—	32	DSQ
2010	28	—	—	DNF1	DNF1	DNF1
2014	32	—	—	DNF1	4	DNS2
