= Alpine skiing at the 2010 Winter Olympics – Women's downhill =

Women's downhill at the XXI Olympic Winter Games
- Venue: Whistler Creekside
- Date: February 17, 2010
- Competitors: 45 from 22 nations
- Winning time: 1:44.19

Medalists
1st place, gold medalist(s)		Lindsey Vonn	United States
2nd place, silver medalist(s)		Julia Mancuso	United States
3rd place, bronze medalist(s)		Elisabeth Görgl	Austria

Women's Downhill
- Interactive map of Women's Downhill
- Location: Whistler Creekside; Franz's Downhill
- Vertical: 770 m (2,526 ft)
- Top elevation: 1,595 m (5,233 ft)
- Base elevation: 825 m (2,707 ft)

The women's downhill competition of the Vancouver 2010 Olympics was held at Whistler Creekside on Wednesday, February 17.

The women's downhill course runs on the top part of Wildcard, then the bottom of Jimmy's Joker, then finishes out of the valley on Lower Franz's Run. Finally the course merges with the Dave Murray Downhill at the Grandstand finish.

The course was labeled as extremely difficult for skiers and most training runs were cancelled due to weather conditions. This resulted in several accidents during the competition. The worst accident involved Swedish skier Anja Pärson, who lost balance on the last jump before the finish, which resulted in a sixty-meter (200 ft) flight and subsequent fall, but without serious health consequences. Earlier in the same place Swiss skier Dominique Gisin fell; Pärson returned the very next day to win the bronze in the super combined.

Lindsey Vonn won the gold medal, teammate Julia Mancuso took the silver, and Elisabeth Görgl was the bronze medalist. This marked the first gold medal for the United States in the women's downhill at the Olympics, and was the only gold medal before Breezy Johnson won the event in 2026. Görgl's mother Traudl Hecher was also a bronze medalist for Austria in this event in 1960 and 1964.

The Franz's Downhill course started at an elevation of 1,595 m (5,233 ft) above sea level with a vertical drop of 770 m (2,526 ft) and a length of 2.939 km (1.83 mi). Vonn's winning time of 104.19 seconds yielded an average course speed of 101.549 km/h (63.1 mph), with an average vertical descent rate of 7.390 m/s (24.2 ft/s).

== Results ==
Wednesday, February 17, 2010

The race was started at 11:00 local time, (UTC −8). At the starting gate, the skies were clear, the temperature was −1.4 °C (29.5 °F), and the snow condition was compact. The temperature at the finish was 4.3 °C (39.7 °F).

Rank	Bib	Name	Country	Time	Difference
1st place, gold medalist(s)	16	Lindsey Vonn	United States	1:44.19	—
2nd place, silver medalist(s)	10	Julia Mancuso	United States	1:44.75	+0.56
3rd place, bronze medalist(s)	5	Elisabeth Görgl	Austria	1:45.65	+1.46
4	14	Andrea Fischbacher	Austria	1:45.68	+1.49
5	18	Fabienne Suter	Switzerland	1:46.17	+1.98
6	6	Britt Janyk	Canada	1:46.21	+2.02
7	15	Marie Marchand-Arvier	France	1:46.22	+2.03
8	22	Maria Riesch	Germany	1:46.26	+2.07
9	7	Lucia Recchia	Italy	1:46.50	+2.31
10	27	Gina Stechert	Germany	1:46.93	+2.74
11	4	Stacey Cook	United States	1:46.98	+2.79
12	12	Nadia Styger	Switzerland	1:47.22	+3.03
13	2	Chemmy Alcott	Great Britain	1:47.31	+3.12
14	28	Regina Mader	Austria	1:47.53	+3.34
15	3	Carolina Ruiz Castillo	Spain	1:47.62	+3.43
16	17	Emily Brydon	Canada	1:47.88	+3.69
17	8	Aurélie Revillet	France	1:47.92	+3.73
18	24	Tina Maze	Slovenia	1:47.94	+3.75
19	9	Nadja Kamer	Switzerland	1:48.14	+3.95
20	36	Maruša Ferk	Slovenia	1:48.24	+4.05
21	37	Shona Rubens	Canada	1:48.53	+4.34
22	26	Johanna Schnarf	Italy	1:48.77	+4.58
23	19	Ingrid Jacquemod	France	1:48.85	+4.66
24	32	Alexandra Coletti	Monaco	1:48.92	+4.73
25	29	Anna Fenninger	Austria	1:49.95	+5.76
26	34	Elena Prosteva	Russia	1:50.07	+5.88
27	31	Šárka Záhrobská	Czech Republic	1:50.68	+6.49
28	39	Mireia Gutiérrez	Andorra	1:52.67	+8.68
29	42	María Belén Simari Birkner	Argentina	1:53.62	+9.43
30	25	Jessica Lindell-Vikarby	Sweden	1:53.76	+9.57
31	38	Macarena Simari Birkner	Argentina	1:54.25	+10.06
32	40	Agnieszka Gasienica Daniel	Poland	1:55.10	+10.91
33	45	Maria Kirkova	Bulgaria	1:56.80	+12.61
34	41	Noelle Barahona	Chile	1:57.47	+13.28
35	43	Anna Berecz	Hungary	1:57.86	+13.67
36	44	Lyudmila Fedotova	Kazakhstan	2:01.58	+17.39
37	1	Klára Křížová	Czech Republic	2:09.27	+25.08
	33	Georgia Simmerling	Canada	DNS	
	11	Dominique Gisin	Switzerland	DNF	
	13	Daniela Merighetti	Italy	DNF	
	20	Marion Rolland	France	DNF	
	21	Anja Pärson	Sweden	DNF	
	30	Elena Fanchini	Italy	DNF	
	35	Edith Miklos	Romania	DNF	
	23	Alice McKennis	United States	DSQ	
