= Laurenne Ross =

American alpine skier

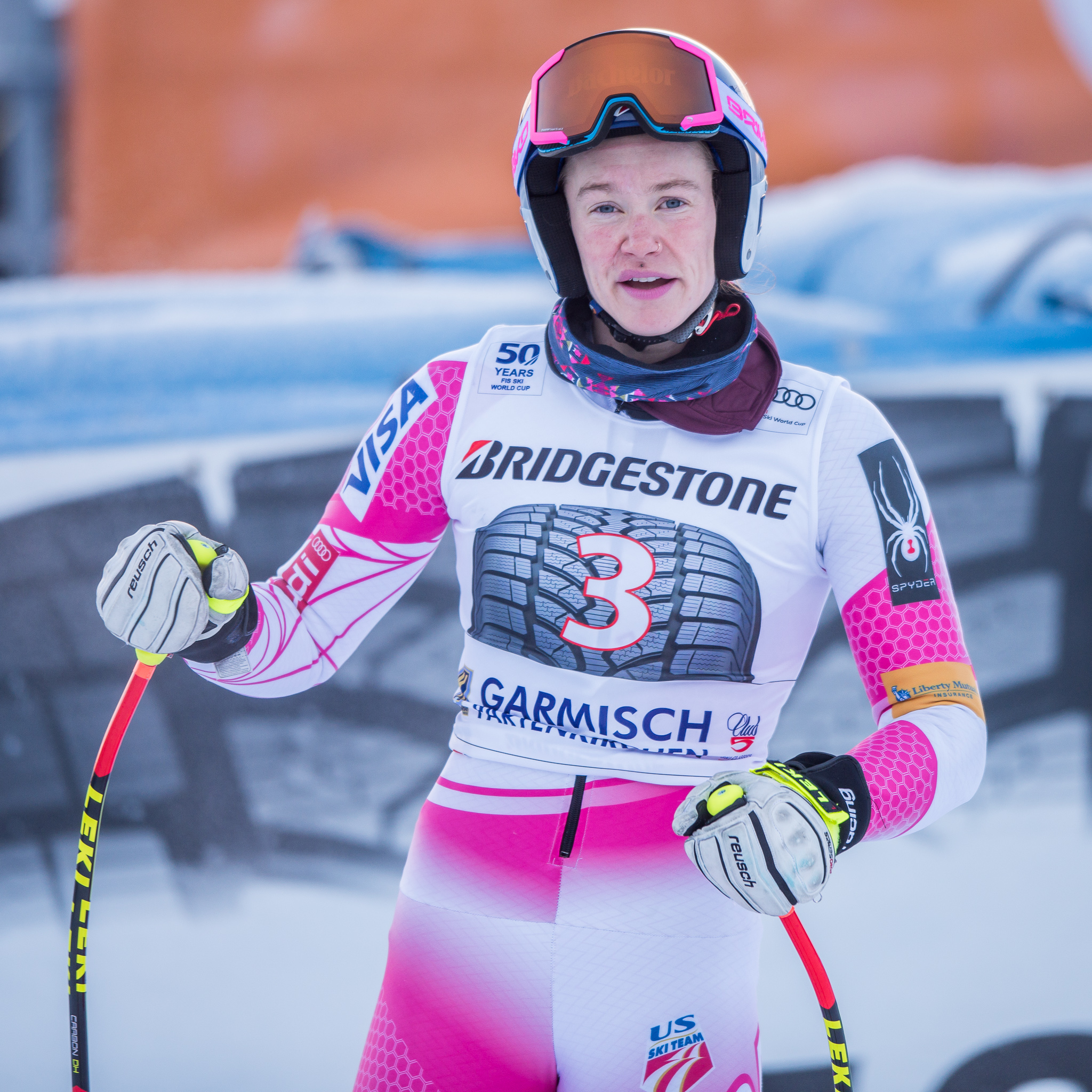
- Ross in 2017

Personal information
- Born: August 17, 1988 (age 37) Edmonton, Alberta, Canada
- Height: 5 ft 8 in (173 cm)
- Website: laurenneross.com

Skiing career
- Sport: Alpine skiing
- Club: Mount Bachelor Ski; Education Foundation
- Retired: April 9, 2021 (age 32)
- Disciplines: Downhill, super-G, combined
- World Cup debut: December 4, 2009 (age 21)

Olympics
- Teams: 2 – (2014, 2018)
- Medals: 0

World Championships
- Teams: 6 – (2011–21)
- Medals: 0

World Cup
- Seasons: 9th – (2011–19)
- Wins: 0
- Podiums: 2 – (1 DH, 1 SG)
- Overall titles: 0 – (18th in 2016)
- Discipline titles: 0 – (8th in SG, 2016)

Laurenne Ross (born August 17, 1988) is an American former World Cup alpine ski racer who specialized in the speed events of downhill and super G.

== Biography ==
Born in Edmonton, Alberta in Canada, Ross was on skis at age two at the Snow Valley ski hill, as her father was a former alpine racer. The family moved to Klamath Falls, Oregon, when she was age 7 and Ross skied and raced at Mount Bachelor near Bend. She was selected to the U.S. Ski Team in 2006, and made her World Cup debut in December 2009. Ross was moved up to the World Cup team for the 2011 season and represented the U.S. at the 2011 World Championships, where she finished tenth in the women's downhill. Ross attained her first World Cup podium in March 2013, placing second in a downhill at Garmisch-Partenkirchen, Germany.

In the summer of 2013, Ross switched from Atomic to Völkl skis.

Ross divided her time between the professional ski circuit and the University of Oregon in Eugene, where she studied art. She graduated in 2025 from the University of California, Berkeley with a Master of Architecture.

== World Cup results ==
=== Season standings ===
Season	Age	Overall	Slalom	Giant Slalom	Super G	Downhill	Combined
2010^	21	115	—	—	—	46	—
2011	22	40	—	—	16	30	22
2012	23	49	—	—	29	22	28
2013	24	26	—	—	13	16	20
2014	25	80	—	—	—	34	20
2015	26	26	—	—	18	11	17
2016	27	18	—	—	8	10	16
2017	28	25	—	—	17	9	24
2018	29	65	—	—	32	32	—
2019	30	57	—	—	32	25	—

Standings through 3 February 2019
^ Only four World Cup starts during 2010 season, while on Nor-Am/European Cup circuit.

=== Top ten finishes ===
- 2 podiums (1 DH, 1 SG)

Season	Date	Location	Discipline	Place
2011	6 Mar 2011	Tarvisio, Italy	Super G	4th
2012	4 Feb 2012	Garmisch, Germany	Downhill	10th
2013	12 Jan 2013	St. Anton, Austria	Downhill	5th
2013	1 Mar 2013	Garmisch, Germany	Super G	9th
2013	2 Mar 2013	Garmisch, Germany	Downhill	2nd
2015	5 Dec 2014	Lake Louise, Canada	Downhill	4th
2015	6 Dec 2014	Lake Louise, Canada	Downhill	6th
2015	16 Jan 2015	Cortina d'Ampezzo, Italy	Downhill	4th
2015	18 Jan 2015	Cortina d'Ampezzo, Italy	Downhill	9th
2016	19 Dec 2015	Val d'Isère, France	Downhill	10th
2016	6 Feb 2016	Garmisch, Germany	Downhill	5th
2016	7 Feb 2016	Garmisch, Germany	Super G	10th
2016	19 Feb 2016	La Thuile, Italy	Downhill	5th
2016	20 Feb 2016	La Thuile, Italy	Downhill	5th
2016	21 Feb 2016	La Thuile, Italy	Super G	9th
2016	27 Feb 2016	Soldeu, Andorra	Super G	2nd
2016	13 Mar 2016	Lenzerheide, Switzerland	Combined	7th
2016	17 Mar 2016	St. Moritz, Switzerland	Super G	5th
2017	2 Dec 2016	Lake Louise, Canada	Downhill	9th
2017	3 Dec 2016	Lake Louise, Canada	Downhill	7th
2017	16 Dec 2016	Val d'Isère, France	Combined	10th
2017	29 Jan 2017	Cortina d'Ampezzo, Italy	Super-G	10th
2017	4 Mar 2017	Jeongseon, South Korea	Downhill	4th
2017	5 Mar 2017	Jeongseon, South Korea	Super-G	6th
2017	15 Mar 2017	(United States) Aspen, USA	Downhill	5th
2018	16 Dec 2017	Val d'Isère, France	Super-G	8th
2019	18 Jan 2019	Cortina d'Ampezzo, Italy	Downhill	9th

== World Championship results ==
Year	Age	Slalom	Giant slalom	Super-G	Downhill	Combined
2011	22	—	—	16	10	28
2013	24	—	DNF2	26	—	11
2015	26	—	—	15	17	14
2017	28	—	—	14	5	15
2019	30	—	—	DNF	—	—
2021	32			–	26	

== Olympic results ==
Year	Age	Slalom	Giant slalom	Super-G	Downhill	Combined
2014	25	—	—	DNF1	11	DNF1
2018	29	—	—	15	15	—

== Video ==
- You Tube.com – Mt. Bachelor – Laurenne Ross – December 2011
