= Maruša Ferk Saioni =

Slovenian alpine skier (born 1988)

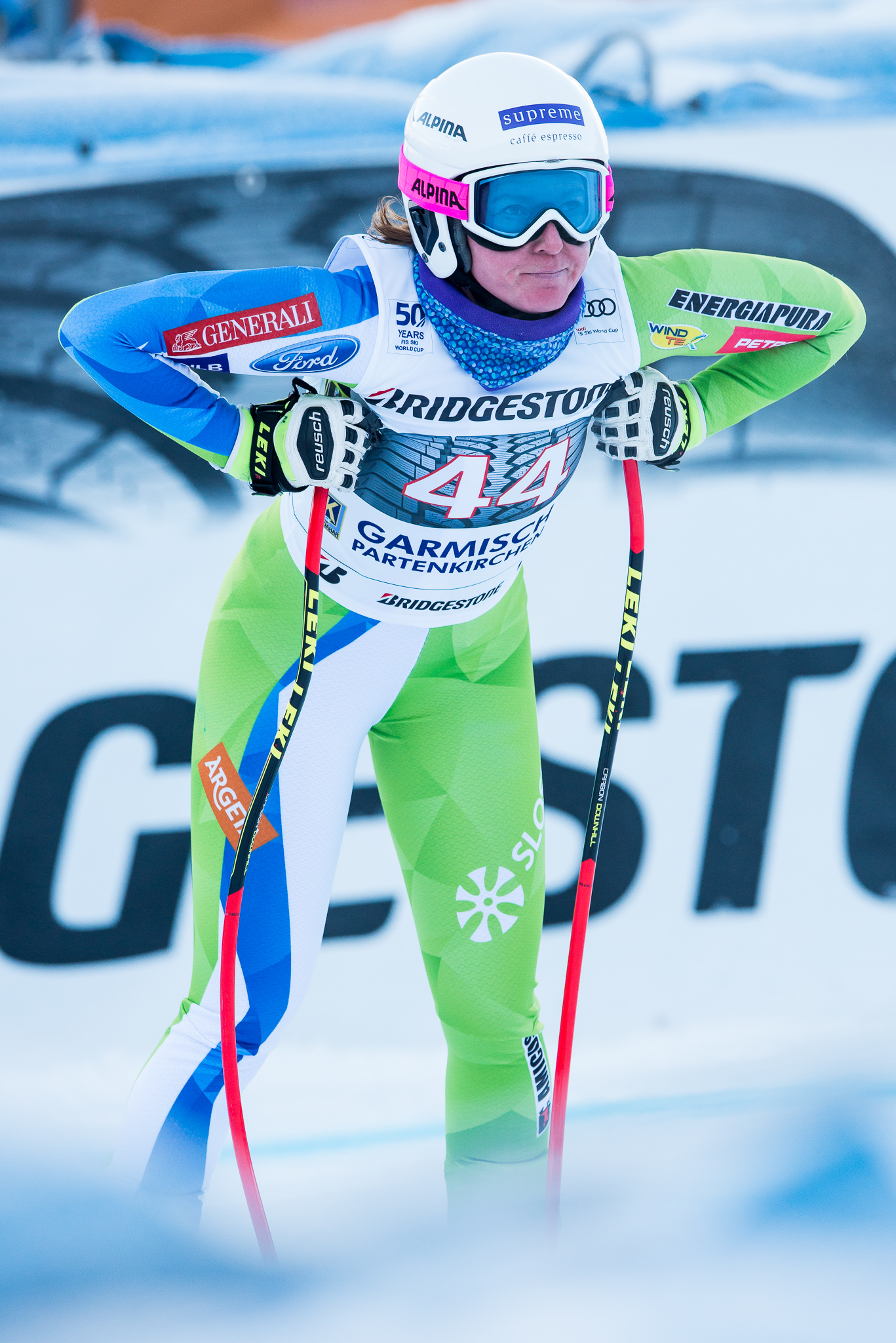
- Maruša Ferk Saioni in 2017

Personal information
- Born: 27 September 1988 (age 37) Jesenice, Socialist Republic of Slovenia, Yugoslavia

Skiing career
- Sport: Alpine skiing
- Club: DTV Partizan Blejska Dobrava
- Disciplines: Downhill, super-G, combined, giant slalom, slalom, Parallel events
- World Cup debut: 21 January 2007 (age 18)

Olympics
- Teams: 4 - (2010-2022)

World Championships
- Teams: 6 - (2007-2011, 2017-2021)

World Cup
- Seasons: 16 - (2007-2022)
- Podiums: 1 - (1 SL)

Maruša Ferk Saioni (born 27 September 1988) is a Slovenian alpine skier.

She is a member of DTV Partizan Blejska Dobrava. In 2020, she married Christophe Saioni, a former alpine skier and current skiing coach from France.

Her best result in the World Cup is a 3rd place in slalom in Garmisch Partenkirchen in 2009.

She was a member of the Slovenian Women's Alpine skiing team at the 2010 Winter Olympics, competing in the women's Downhill, Women's Super, Women's slalom and Women's Combined events. At 21 years 143 days she was the youngest member of the Slovenian team at the Games

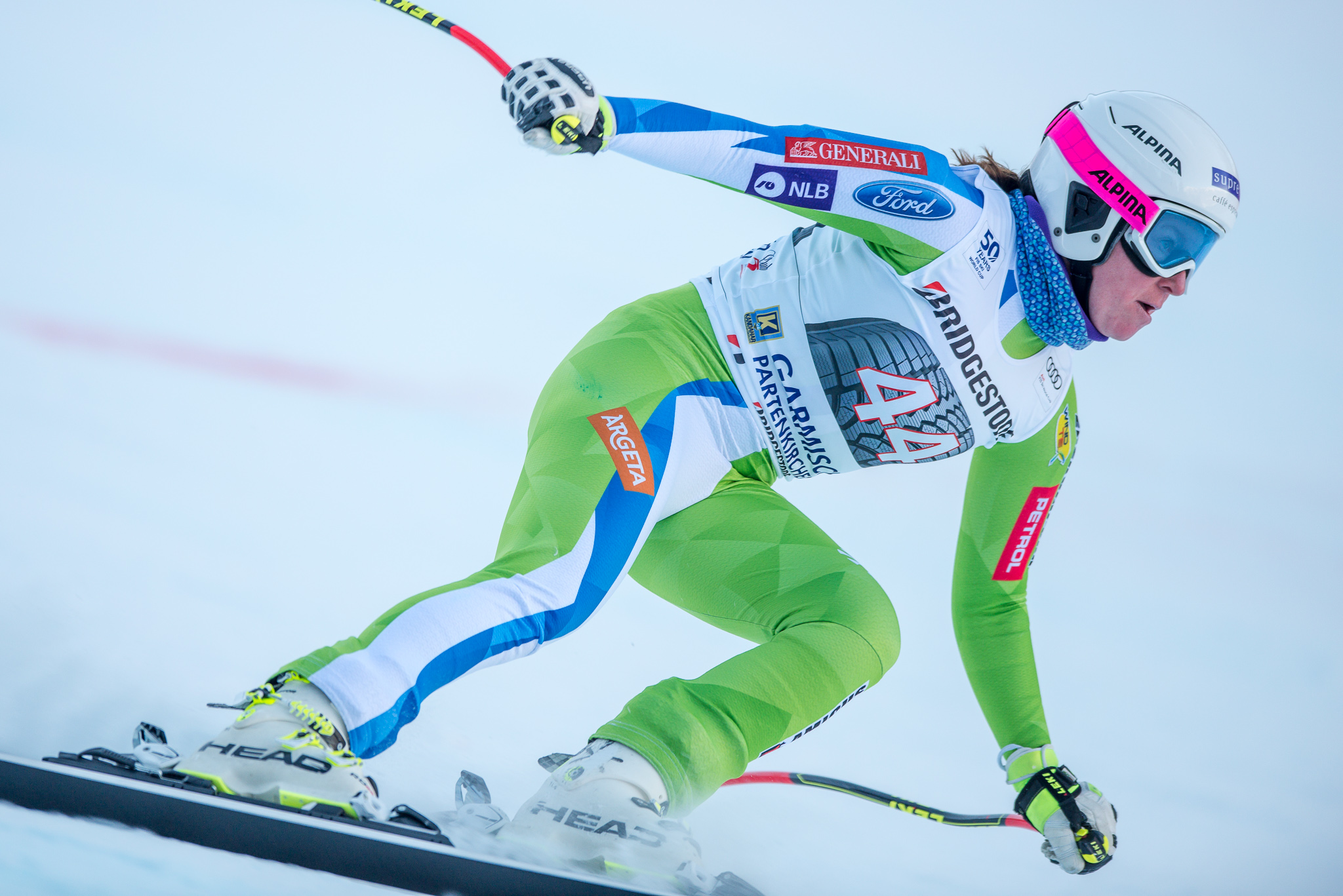
Ferk in January 2017

== World Cup results ==
=== Season standings ===
Season	Age	Overall	Slalom	Giant slalom	Super-G	Downhill	Combined
2007	18	111	—	42	—	—	—
2008	19	94	39	—	—	—	—
2009	20	51	19	42	—	—	37
2010	21	44	29	—	32	32	13
2011	22	58	46	—	50	30	18
2012	23	45	—	—	40	23	6
2013	24	114	52	—	—	—	—
2014	25	59	50	—	32	33	16
2015	26	121	—	—	55	—	—
2016	27	60	32	—	50	38	—
2017	28	62	29	—	—	49	—
2018	29	58	25	—	54	—	13
2019	30	77	30	—	—	—	—
2020	31	75	—	—	50	—	12
2021	32	67	—	—	27	43	—

- Standings through 13 February 2021

=== Race podiums ===
- 1 podium – (1 SL)

Season	Date	Location	Discipline	Place
2009	30 Jan 2009	Garmish-Partenkirchen, Germany	Slalom	3rd

== World Championship results ==
Year	Age	Slalom	Giant slalom	Super-G	Downhill	Combined
2007	18	27	27	–	–	–
2009	20	17	27	DNF	22	10
2011	22	DNF	26	27	12	9
2017	28	–	–	30	28	8
2019	30	27	–	–	33	18
2021	32			24	22	

== Olympic results ==
Year
Year	Age	Slalom	Giant; Slalom	Super G	Downhill	Combined
2010	21	23	—	DNF	20	15
2014	25	19	DNF	16	18	10
2018	29	18	—	25	19	DSQ
