= FIS Alpine World Ski Championships 2011 – Women's downhill =

Women's Downhill
- Location: Garmisch Classic, Kandahar 1
- Vertical: 720 m (2,362 ft)
- Top elevation: 1,490 m (4,888 ft)
- Base elevation: 770 m (2,526 ft)

Complete results for Women's Downhill competition at the 2011 World Championships, held on February 13. The fifth race of the championships, 36 athletes from 16 countries competed.

== Results ==
The race started at 11:00 local time (UTC+1)

Rank	Bib	Name	Nation	Time	Difference
1st place, gold medalist(s)	16	Elisabeth Görgl	Austria	1:47.24	—
2nd place, silver medalist(s)	20	Lindsey Vonn	United States	1:47.68	+0.44
3rd place, bronze medalist(s)	17	Maria Riesch	Germany	1:47.84	+0.60
4	13	Lara Gut	Switzerland	1:48.18	+0.94
5	29	Tina Maze	Slovenia	1:48.22	+0.98
6	18	Julia Mancuso	United States	1:48.30	+1.06
7	22	Daniela Merighetti	Italy	1:48.66	+1.42
8	10	Dominique Gisin	Switzerland	1:48.70	+1.46
9	9	Andrea Fischbacher	Austria	1:48.86	+1.62
10	1	Laurenne Ross	United States	1:48.87	+1.63
11	19	Anja Pärson	Sweden	1:49.02	+1.78
12	2	Maruša Ferk	Slovenia	1:49.04	+1.80
13	15	Fabienne Suter	Switzerland	1:49.14	+1.90
14	21	Nadja Kamer	Switzerland	1:49.19	+1.95
15	25	Britt Janyk	Canada	1:49.35	+2.11
16	7	Elena Fanchini	Italy	1:49.53	+2.29
17	14	Anna Fenninger	Austria	1:49.60	+2.36
18	11	Ingrid Jacquemod	France	1:49.72	+2.48
19	4	Carolina Ruiz Castillo	Spain	1:50.05	+2.81
20	12	Marion Rolland	France	1:50.09	+2.85
21	26	Johanna Schnarf	Italy	1:50.15	+2.91
22	8	Marie Marchand-Arvier	France	1:50.18	+2.94
23	24	Regina Mader	Austria	1:50.33	+3.09
24	3	Alexandra Coletti	Monaco	1:50.39	+3.15
25	28	Stacey Cook	United States	1:50.53	+3.29
26	30	Aurelie Revillet	France	1:50.94	+3.70
27	27	Verena Stuffer	Italy	1:50.97	+3.73
28	6	Klára Křížová	Czech Republic	1:52.46	+5.22
29	32	María Belén Simari Birkner	Argentina	1:53.92	+6.68
30	35	Daniela Marková	Czech Republic	1:56.08	+8.84
31	31	Macarena Simari Birkner	Argentina	1:56.13	+8.89
32	33	Pavla Klicnarová	Czech Republic	1:56.37	+9.13
33	34	Anna Berecz	Hungary	1:57.91	+10.67
34	36	Bogdana Matsotska	Ukraine	1:59.04	+11.80
	5	Leanne Smith	United States	DNF	
	23	Lotte Smiseth Sejersted	Norway	DNF	
