= FIS Alpine World Ski Championships 2009 – Women's super-G =

Complete results for Women's Super-G competition at the 2009 World Championships. It was run on February 3, the first race of the championships.

| Rank | Name | Country | Time | Diff. |
|---|---|---|---|---|
| Gold | Lindsey Vonn | (United States) | 1:20.73 | -- |
| Silver | Marie Marchand-Arvier | (France) | 1:21.07 | +0.34 |
| Bronze | Andrea Fischbacher | (Austria) | 1:21.13 | +0.40 |
| 4 | Anna Fenninger | (Austria) | 1:22.01 | +1.28 |
| 5 | Tina Maze | (Slovenia) | 1:22.06 | +1.33 |
| 6 | Elisabeth Görgl | (Austria) | 1:22.27 | +1.54 |
| 7 | Lara Gut | (Switzerland) | 1:22.34 | +1.61 |
| 8 | Maria Riesch | (Germany) | 1:22.44 | +1.71 |
| 9 | Nadia Fanchini | (Italy) | 1:22.75 | +2.02 |
| 10 | Viktoria Rebensburg | (Germany) | 1:22.80 | +2.07 |
| 11 | Fabienne Suter | (Switzerland) | 1:22.90 | +2.17 |
| 12 | Jessica Lindell-Vikarby | (Sweden) | 1:22.91 | +2.18 |
| 13 | Emily Brydon | (Canada) | 1:22.95 | +2.22 |
| 14 | Carolina Ruiz Castillo | (Spain) | 1:23.37 | +2.64 |
| 15 | Šárka Záhrobská | (Czech Republic) | 1:23.53 | +2.80 |
| 16 | Marion Rolland | (France) | 1:23.86 | +3.13 |
| 17 | Britt Janyk | (Canada) | 1:24.58 | +3.85 |
| 18 | Edith Miklós | (Romania) | 1:24.69 | +3.96 |
| 19 | Ingrid Jacquemod | (France) | 1:24.70 | +3.97 |
| 20 | Chemmy Alcott | (United Kingdom) | 1:25.19 | +4.46 |
| 21 | Wendy Siorpaes | (Italy) | 1:25.35 | +4.62 |
| 22 | Stacey Cook | (United States) | 1:25.38 | +4.65 |
| 23 | Kelly Vanderbeek | (Canada) | 1:25.83 | +5.10 |
| 24 | Aurélie Revillet | (France) | 1:26.28 | +5.55 |
| 25 | Klára Křížová | (Czech Republic) | 1:26.48 | +5.75 |
| 26 | Jelena Lolović | (Serbia) | 1:27.33 | +6.60 |
| 27 | Vanja Brodnik | (Slovenia) | 1:27.39 | +6.66 |
| 28 | Maria Kirkova | (Bulgaria) | 1:29.37 | +8.64 |
| 29 | Mireia Gutiérrez | (Andorra) | 1:29.70 | +8.97 |
| 30 | Lizaveta Kuzmenka | (Belarus) | 1:29.92 | +9.19 |
| 31 | Marija Schkanova | (Belarus) | 1:32.58 | +11.85 |
| 32 | Anastasiya Skryabina | (Ukraine) | 1:33.10 | +12.37 |
| 33 | Bogdana Matsotska | (Ukraine) | 1:34.15 | +13.42 |
| 34 | Anna Berecz | (Hungary) | 1:34.58 | +13.85 |
| 35 | Stéphanie Joffroy | (Chile) | 1:35.20 | +14.47 |
| 36 | Tamara Gisem | (Ukraine) | 1:35.31 | +14.58 |
| 37 | Noelle Barahona | (Chile) | 1:36.30 | +15.57 |
| 38 | Florencia Marinovic | (Chile) | 1:36.41 | +15.68 |
| – | Chelsea Marshall | (United States) | DNS | – |
| – | Gina Stechert | (Germany) | DNF | – |
| – | Daniela Merighetti | (Italy) | DNF | – |
| – | Julia Mancuso | (United States) | DNF | – |
| – | Renate Götschl | (Austria) | DNF | – |
| – | Fränzi Aufdenblatten | (Switzerland) | DNF | – |
| – | Andrea Dettling | (Switzerland) | DNF | – |
| – | Anja Pärson | (Sweden) | DNF | – |
| – | Lucia Recchia | (Italy) | DNF | – |
| – | Maruša Ferk | (Slovenia) | DNF | – |
| – | Mateja Robnik | (Slovenia) | DNF | – |
| – | Alexandra Coletti | (Monaco) | DNF | – |
| – | Larisa Yurkiw | (Canada) | DNF | – |
| – | Leyre Morland | (Spain) | DNF | – |
| – | Frida Hansdotter | (Sweden) | DNF | – |
| – | Isabel van Buynder | (Belgium) | DNF | – |
| – | Lyudmila Fedotova | (Kazakhstan) | DNF | – |
| – | Lucie Hrstková | (Czech Republic) | DQ | – |
