= Zsófia Döme =

Hungarian alpine skier (born 1992)

Zsófia Döme (born 18 June 1992) is an alpine skier from Hungary. She competed for Hungary at the 2010 Winter Olympics. Her best result was a 36th in the super-G.
