= Bianca Narea =

Romanian alpine skier (born 1986)

Personal information
- Nationality: Romanian
- Born: 30 November 1986 (age 38); Brașov, Romania

Sport
- Sport: Alpine skiing

Bianca Narea (born 30 November 1986) is a Romanian alpine skier. She competed in the women's giant slalom at the 2006 Winter Olympics.
