= FIS Alpine World Ski Championships 2011 – Women's super-G =

Women's Super G
- Location: Garmisch Classic, Kandahar 1
- Vertical: 535 m (1,755 ft)
- Top elevation: 1,305 m (4,281 ft)
- Base elevation: 770 m (2,526 ft)

Complete results for Women's Super-G competition at the 2011 World Championships. It ran on February 8 at 11:00 local time, the first race of the championships. 49 athletes from 20 countries competed.

== Results ==
Rank	Bib	Name	Country	Time	Difference
1st place, gold medalist(s)	16	Elisabeth Görgl	Austria	1:23.82	
2nd place, silver medalist(s)	21	Julia Mancuso	United States	1:23.87	+0.05
3rd place, bronze medalist(s)	17	Maria Riesch	Germany	1:24.03	+0.21
4	19	Lara Gut	Switzerland	1:24.26	+0.44
5	8	Anna Fenninger	Austria	1:24.64	+0.82
6	7	Elena Curtoni	Italy	1:24.65	+0.83
7	22	Lindsey Vonn	United States	1:24.66	+0.84
8	10	Fabienne Suter	Switzerland	1:24.75	+0.93
9	6	Daniela Merighetti	Italy	1:24.91	+1.09
10	20	Anja Pärson	Sweden	1:24.99	+1.17
11	14	Tina Maze	Slovenia	1:25.06	+1.24
12	23	Nicole Hosp	Austria	1:25.25	+1.43
13	11	Nadja Kamer	Switzerland	1:25.36	+1.54
14	1	Jessica Lindell-Vikarby	Sweden	1:25.40	+1.58
15	28	Britt Janyk	Canada	1:25.42	+1.60
16	5	Laurenne Ross	United States	1:25.65	+1.83
17	13	Ingrid Jacquemod	France	1:25.91	+2.09
18	29	Elena Fanchini	Italy	1:25.95	+2.13
19	3	Leanne Smith	United States	1:25.96	+2.14
20	15	Marie Marchand-Arvier	France	1:25.97	+2.15
21	2	Marion Rolland	France	1:26.13	+2.31
22	31	Marie-Michèle Gagnon	Canada	1:26.32	+2.50
23	25	Johanna Schnarf	Italy	1:26.86	+3.04
24	36	Marie-Pier Prefontaine	Canada	1:27.25	+3.43
25	4	Margot Bailet	France	1:27.27	+3.45
26	26	Carolina Ruiz Castillo	Spain	1:27.75	+3.93
27	24	Marusa Ferk	Slovenia	1:28.48	+4.66
28	40	María José Rienda	Spain	1:28.68	+4.86
29	43	Maria Shkanova	Belarus	1:29.14	+5.32
30	42	Alexandra Coletti	Monaco	1:29.31	+5.49
31	45	Edit Miklós	Hungary	1:29.36	+5.54
32	44	Andrea Zemanová	Czech Republic	1:29.42	+5.60
33	38	Anna Sorokina	Russia	1:29.88	+6.06
34	33	Karolina Chrapek	Poland	1:29.89	+6.07
35	41	María Belén Simari Birkner	Argentina	1:31.73	+7.91
36	46	Anna Berecz	Hungary	1:32.19	+8.37
37	47	Pavla Klicnarová	Czech Republic	1:34.20	+10.38
38	49	Bogdana Matsotska	Ukraine	1:35.26	+11.44
DNF	9	Dominique Gisin	Switzerland		
DNS	12	Viktoria Rebensburg	Germany		
DNF	18	Andrea Fischbacher	Austria		
DNF	27	Stacey Cook	United States		
DNF	30	Gina Stechert	Germany		
DNF	32	Lotte Smiseth Sejersted	Norway		
DNF	34	Andrea Jardi	Spain		
DNF	35	Klára Křížová	Czech Republic		
DNF	37	Agnieszka Gąsienica Daniel	Poland		
DNF	39	Mireia Gutiérrez	Andorra		
DNF	48	Macarena Simari Birkner	Argentina		
