= FIS Alpine World Ski Championships 2011 – Women's super combined =

Complete results for Women's Super Combined competition at the 2011 World Championships. It ran on February 11 at 10:00 local time (downhill) and 14:00 local time (slalom), the third race of the championships. 40 athletes from 18 countries competed.

== Results ==
Rank	Bib	Name	Nation	Downhill	Rank	Slalom	Rank	Total	Difference
1st place, gold medalist(s)	21	Anna Fenninger	Austria	1:49.67	4	53.56	4	2:43.23	
2nd place, silver medalist(s)	13	Tina Maze	Slovenia	1:50.38	10	52.94	2	2:43.32	+0.09
3rd place, bronze medalist(s)	22	Anja Pärson	Sweden	1:49.54	3	53.96	8	2:43.50	+0.27
4	4	Dominique Gisin	Switzerland	1:49.53	2	54.37	10	2:43.90	+0.67
5	18	Elisabeth Görgl	Austria	1:49.27	1	54.85	15	2:44.12	+0.89
6	23	Denise Feierabend	Switzerland	1:50.09	7	54.42	12	2:44.51	+1.28
7	12	Julia Mancuso	United States	1:50.18	9	54.38	11	2:44.56	+1.33
8	11	Johanna Schnarf	Italy	1:50.80	11	53.79	5	2:44.59	+1.36
9	15	Maruša Ferk	Slovenia	1:51.94	23	53.06	3	2:45.00	+1.77
10	7	Lotte Smiseth Sejersted	Norway	1:51.17	14	53.85	6	2:45.02	+1.79
11	19	Maria Riesch	Germany	1:51.27	15	53.87	7	2:45.14	+1.91
12	14	Nicole Hosp	Austria	1:53.95	27	51.66	1	2:45.61	+2.38
13	20	Michaela Kirchgasser	Austria	1:51.92	22	54.06	9	2:45.98	+2.75
14	1	Margot Bailet	France	1:51.69	20	54.56	13	2:46.25	+3.02
15	8	Marie Marchand-Arvier	France	1:51.35	16	54.96	16	2:46.31	+3.08
16	25	Elena Curtoni	Italy	1:51.66	19	55.65	19	2:47.31	+4.08
17	31	Andrea Jardi	Spain	1:52.89	24	54.74	14	2:47.63	+4.40
18	5	Agnieszka Gąsienica Daniel	Poland	1:54.38	29	55.41	17	2:49.79	+6.56
18	33	María Belén Simari Birkner	Argentina	1:54.63	30	55.16	18	2:49.79	+6.56
20	32	Karolina Chrapek	Poland	1:54.97	31	56.52	21	2:51.49	+8.26
21	28	Macarena Simari Birkner	Argentina	1:55.67	32	56.39	20	2:52.06	+8.83
22	29	Alexandra Coletti	Monaco	1:51.76	21	1:00.57	26	2:52.33	+9.10
23	37	Edit Miklós	Hungary	1:54.01	28	58.58	23	2:52.59	+9.36
24	34	Klára Křížová	Czech Republic	1:53.30	26	1:00.70	27	2:54.00	+10.77
25	35	Daniela Marková	Czech Republic	1:56.46	34	59.23	24	2:55.69	+12.46
26	38	Bogdana Matsotska	Ukraine	2:00.89	36	57.70	22	2:58.59	+15.36
27	36	Anna Berecz	Hungary	1:59.10	35	1:00.24	25	2:59.34	+16.11
28	26	Laurenne Ross	United States	1:50.07	6	1:27.94	28	3:18.01	+34.78
	16	Lindsey Vonn	United States	1:50.87	12	DNS			
	17	Fabienne Suter	Switzerland	1:51.59	17	DNS			
	24	Aurélie Revillet	France	1:51.12	13	DNS			
	40	Britt Janyk	Canada	1:50.13	8	DNS			
	2	Francesca Marsaglia	Italy	1:51.61	18	DNF			
	3	Mireia Gutiérrez	Andorra	1:56.10	33	DNF			
	9	Lara Gut	Switzerland	1:49.98	5	DNF			
	30	Marie-Michèle Gagnon	Canada	1:53.11	25	DNF			
	27	Jessica Lindell-Vikarby	Sweden	DNS					
	39	Carolina Ruiz Castillo	Spain	DNS					
	6	Leanne Smith	United States	DNF					
	10	Daniela Merighetti	Italy	DNF					
