= FIS Alpine World Ski Championships 2013 – Women's super combined =

Women's super combined at the FIS Alpine World Ski Championships 2013
- Venue: Planai; Schladming, Austria
- Date: 8 February 2013
- Competitors: 47 from 25 nations
- Winning time: 2:39.92

Medalists
gold medal	Maria Höfl-Riesch	Germany
silver medal	Tina Maze	Slovenia
bronze medal	Nicole Hosp	Austria

The Women's super combined competition at the 2013 World Championships was held on Friday, February 8. There were 47 athletes competing from 25 countries.

== Results ==
The downhill race started at 10:00 local time (UTC+1) and the slalom at 14:00.

Rank	Bib	Name	Nation	Downhill	Rank	Slalom	Rank	Total	Difference
1st place, gold medalist(s)	20	Maria Höfl-Riesch	Germany	1:49.87	4	50.05	2	2:39.92	
2nd place, silver medalist(s)	18	Tina Maze	Slovenia	1:49.67	1	50.71	5	2:40.38	+0.46
3rd place, bronze medalist(s)	16	Nicole Hosp	Austria	1:50.99	9	49.93	1	2:40.92	+1.00
4	8	Michaela Kirchgasser	Austria	1:51.36	16	50.20	3	2:41.56	+1.64
5	22	Kathrin Zettel	Austria	1:51.28	13	50.43	4	2:41.71	+1.79
6	19	Elisabeth Görgl	Austria	1:49.72	3	52.52	12	2:42.24	+2.32
7	29	Sofia Goggia	Italy	1:50.07	6	52.62	16	2:42.69	+2.77
8	11	Julia Mancuso	United States	1:51.60	19	51.65	7	2:43.25	+3.33
9	33	Sara Hector	Sweden	1:52.20	25	51.39	6	2:43.59	+3.67
10	9	Dominique Gisin	Switzerland	1:51.09	10	52.51	11	2:43.60	+3.68
11	4	Laurenne Ross	United States	1:51.28	13	52.60	15	2:43.88	+3.96
12	35	Veronique Hronek	Germany	1:51.69	21	52.20	9	2:43.89	+3.97
13	10	Elena Curtoni	Italy	1:51.67	20	52.53	13	2:44.20	+4.28
14	2	Marianne Kaufmann-Abderhalden	Switzerland	1:51.44	17	53.26	17	2:44.70	+4.78
15	15	Elena Fanchini	Italy	1:50.87	8	54.19	18	2:45.06	+5.14
16	13	Anne-Sophie Barthet	France	1:53.57	31	52.06	8	2:45.63	+5.77
17	30	Ragnhild Mowinckel	Norway	1:53.17	28	52.59	14	2:45.76	+5.84
18	32	Stacey Cook	United States	1:51.29	15	55.41	25	2:46.70	+6.78
19	28	Edit Miklós	Hungary	1:51.82	22	55.36	24	2:47.18	+7.26
20	3	Vanja Brodnik	Slovenia	1:53.24	29	54.43	20	2:47.67	+7.75
21	6	Elena Yakovishina	Russia	1:53.65	32	54.59	22	2:48.24	+8.32
22	26	Jana Gantnerová	Slovakia	1:56.11	38	52.47	10	2:48.58	+8.66
23	41	Aleksandra Prokopyeva	Russia	1:55.24	35	54.58	21	2:49.82	+9.90
24	31	Anastasia Kedrina	Russia	1:54.10	33	56.82	29	2:50.92	+11.00
25	36	Greta Small	Australia	1:56.62	39	54.78	23	2:51.40	+11.48
26	45	Macarena Simari Birkner	Argentina	1:57.79	41	54.39	19	2:52.18	+12.26
27	5	Karolina Chrapek	Poland	1:55.40	36	56.91	30	2:52.31	+12.39
28	39	Maria Bedareva	Russia	1:54.70	34	58.18	32	2:52.88	+12.96
29	42	Isabel van Buynder	Belgium	1:57.43	40	55.91	27	2:53.34	+13.42
30	40	Maria Shkanova	Belarus	1:58.59	42	56.05	28	2:54.64	+14.72
31	47	Andrea Komšić	Croatia	1:59.22	43	55.85	26	2:55.07	+15.15
32	46	Bogdana Matsotska	Ukraine	1:59.56	44	57.44	31	2:57.00	+17.08
	1	Tina Weirather	Liechtenstein	1:52.00	23	DNS			
	7	Leanne Smith	United States	1:51.26	12	DNS			
	14	Daniela Merighetti	Italy	1:50.86	7	DNS			
	37	Nadja Kamer	Switzerland	1:51.48	18	DNS			
	12	Lotte Smiseth Sejersted	Norway	1:51.22	11	DNF			
	17	Anna Fenninger	Austria	1:49.67	1	DNF			
	21	Lara Gut	Switzerland	1:49.87	4	DNF			
	23	Larisa Yurkiw	Canada	1:52.12	24	DNF			
	24	Klára Křížová	Czech Republic	1:52.30	27	DNF			
	25	Ilka Štuhec	Slovenia	1:52.21	26	DNF			
	27	Alexandra Coletti	Monaco	1:53.53	30	DNF			
	38	Mireia Gutiérrez	Andorra	1:55.85	37	DNF			
	43	María Belén Simari Birkner	Argentina	2:00.14	45	DNF			
	44	Maria Kirkova	Bulgaria	DNS					
	34	Agnieszka Gąsienica-Daniel	Poland	DNF					
