= FIS Alpine World Ski Championships 2015 – Women's downhill =

Women's downhill at the FIS Alpine World Ski Championships 2015
- Venue: Raptor; Beaver Creek, Colorado, U.S.
- Date: February 6, 2015
- Competitors: 39 from 19 nations
- Winning time: 1:45.89

Medalists
gold medal	Tina Maze	Slovenia
silver medal	Anna Fenninger	Austria
bronze medal	Lara Gut	Switzerland

Women's Downhill
- Location: Raptor; Beaver Creek, Colorado
- Vertical: 710 m (2,329 ft)
- Top elevation: 3,440 m (11,286 ft)
- Base elevation: 2,730 m (8,957 ft)
- Longest run: 2.530 km (1.57 mi)

The Women's downhill competition at the 2015 World Championships was held on Friday, February 6.

Slovenia's Tina Maze won the gold medal, Anna Fenninger of Austria took the silver, and the bronze medalist was Lara Gut of Switzerland.

The race course was 2.530 km (1.57 mi) in length, with a vertical drop of 710 m (2,329 ft) from a starting elevation of 3,440 m (11,286 ft) above sea level. Maze's winning time of 105.89 seconds yielded an average speed of 86.014 km/h (53.4 mph) and an average vertical descent rate of 6.705 m/s (22.0 ft/s).

== Results ==
The race started at 11:00 MST (UTC−7).

Rank	Bib	Name	Country	Time	Diff.
1st place, gold medalist(s)	21	Tina Maze	Slovenia	1:45.89	—
2nd place, silver medalist(s)	16	Anna Fenninger	Austria	1:45.91	+0.02
3rd place, bronze medalist(s)	19	Lara Gut	Switzerland	1:46.23	+0.34
4	4	Nicole Schmidhofer	Austria	1:46.92	+1.03
5	22	Lindsey Vonn	United States	1:46.94	+1.05
6	18	Elisabeth Görgl	Austria	1:46.95	+1.06
7	6	Nadja Jnglin-Kamer	Switzerland	1:46.97	+1.08
8	8	Daniela Merighetti	Italy	1:47.14	+1.25
9	15	Fabienne Suter	Switzerland	1:47.18	+1.29
10	17	Viktoria Rebensburg	Germany	1:47.24	+1.35
11	13	Tina Weirather	Liechtenstein	1:47.27	+1.38
12	1	Nadia Fanchini	Italy	1:47.34	+1.45
13	5	Edit Miklós	Hungary	1:47.53	+1.64
14	12	Larisa Yurkiw	Canada	1:47.65	+1.76
15	23	Cornelia Hütter	Austria	1:47.87	+1.98
16	10	Julia Mancuso	United States	1:47.93	+2.04
17	14	Laurenne Ross	United States	1:47.95	+2.06
18	11	Kajsa Kling	Sweden	1:47.99	+2.10
19	9	Stacey Cook	United States	1:48.05	+2.16
20	27	Ilka Štuhec	Slovenia	1:48.06	+2.17
21	7	Alexandra Coletti	Monaco	1:48.07	+2.18
21	24	Margot Bailet	France	1:48.07	+2.18
23	2	Carolina Ruiz Castillo	Spain	1:48.27	+2.38
24	3	Jennifer Piot	France	1:48.34	+2.45
25	29	Ragnhild Mowinckel	Norway	1:48.54	+2.65
26	20	Elena Fanchini	Italy	1:48.72	+2.83
27	30	Maria Therese Tviberg	Norway	1:48.78	+2.89
28	25	Johanna Schnarf	Italy	1:48.80	+2.91
29	26	Marianne Abderhalden	Switzerland	1:48.82	+2.93
30	31	Vanja Brodnik	Slovenia	1:49.55	+3.66
31	33	Veronique Hronek	Germany	1:50.43	+4.54
32	32	Klára Křížová	Czech Republic	1:50.79	+4.90
33	35	Greta Small	Australia	1:51.97	+6.08
34	36	Macarena Simari Birkner	Argentina	1:53.18	+7.29
35	37	Noelle Barahona	Chile	1:53.77	+7.88
36	39	Leona Popović	Croatia	1:53.88	+7.99
37	38	Andrea Komšić	Croatia	1:54.00	+8.11
	28	Marie Marchand-Arvier	France	DNF	
	34	Valérie Grenier	Canada	DNF	
