= FIS Alpine World Ski Championships 2017 – Women's alpine combined =

Women's alpine combined at the FIS Alpine World Ski Championships 2017
- Venue: Piz Nair
- Location: St. Moritz, Switzerland
- Dates: 10 February
- Competitors: 41 from 19 nations
- Winning time: 1:58.88

Medalists
gold medal	Wendy Holdener	Switzerland
silver medal	Michelle Gisin	Switzerland
bronze medal	Michaela Kirchgasser	Austria

The Women's alpine combined competition at the 2017 World Championships was held on 10 February.

== Results ==
The downhill race was started at 10:00 and the slalom race at 13:00.

Rank	Bib	Name	Nation	Downhill	Rank	Slalom	Rank	Total	Diff
1st place, gold medalist(s)	7	Wendy Holdener	Switzerland	1:17.84	7	41.04	2	1:58.88	
2nd place, silver medalist(s)	13	Michelle Gisin	Switzerland	1:17.47	4	41.46	4	1:58.93	+0.05
3rd place, bronze medalist(s)	3	Michaela Kirchgasser	Austria	1:18.23	11	41.03	1	1:59.26	+0.38
4	15	Denise Feierabend	Switzerland	1:18.38	13	41.32	3	1:59.70	+0.82
5	19	Lindsey Vonn	United States	1:17.75	6	41.98	11	1:59.73	+0.85
6	5	Marie-Michèle Gagnon	Canada	1:18.61	16	41.54	5	2:00.15	+1.27
7	17	Federica Brignone	Italy	1:18.51	15	41.75	7	2:00.26	+1.38
8	2	Maruša Ferk	Slovenia	1:18.31	12	42.41	14	2:00.72	+1.84
9	14	Ricarda Haaser	Austria	1:19.17	20	41.64	6	2:00.81	+1.93
10	12	Ragnhild Mowinckel	Norway	1:18.22	9	42.62	17	2:00.84	+1.96
11	43	Valérie Grenier	Canada	1:18.82	17	42.12	12	2:00.94	+2.06
12	11	Anne-Sophie Barthet	France	1:18.12	8	42.84	20	2:00.96	+2.08
13	16	Christine Scheyer	Austria	1:18.45	14	42.78	19	2:01.23	+2.35
14	24	Maria Therese Tviberg	Norway	1:19.48	24	41.79	8	2:01.27	+2.39
15	4	Laurenne Ross	United States	1:17.57	5	43.75	22	2:01.32	+2.44
16	20	Romane Miradoli	France	1:19.11	19	42.53	15	2:01.64	+2.76
17	41	Kristin Lysdahl	Norway	1:19.96	26	41.82	9	2:01.78	+2.90
17	21	Marta Bassino	Italy	1:19.92	25	41.86	10	2:01.78	+2.90
19	31	Lisa Hörnblad	Sweden	1:19.37	21	42.56	16	2:01.93	+3.05
20	30	Ester Ledecká	Czech Republic	1:19.45	23	42.67	18	2:02.12	+3.24
21	28	Candace Crawford	Canada	1:20.42	29	42.22	13	2:02.64	+3.76
22	29	Stacey Cook	United States	1:19.38	22	44.02	25	2:03.40	+4.52
23	35	Maryna Gąsienica-Daniel	Poland	1:20.54	32	43.35	21	2:03.89	+5.01
24	23	Nevena Ignjatović	Serbia	1:21.23	35	43.81	24	2:05.04	+6.16
25	33	Aleksandra Prokopyeva	Russia	1:20.50	31	44.69	27	2:05.19	+6.31
26	27	Macarena Simari Birkner	Argentina	1:21.62	36	44.20	26	2:05.82	+6.94
27	42	Sarah Schleper	Mexico	1:23.94	39	46.10	28	2:10.04	+11.16
28	37	Pavla Klicnarová	Czech Republic	1:22.52	38	47.71	29	2:10.23	+11.35
—	6	Sofia Goggia	Italy	1:16.90	1	DNF			
—	1	Ilka Štuhec	Slovenia	1:17.02	2	DNF			
—	10	Elena Curtoni	Italy	1:18.22	9	DNF			
—	18	Rosina Schneeberger	Austria	1:18.91	18	DNF			
—	36	Mikaela Tommy	Canada	1:20.38	28	DNF			
—	22	Ana Bucik	Slovenia	1:20.42	29	DNF			
—	38	Leona Popović	Croatia	1:20.62	33	DNF			
—	26	Kateřina Pauláthová	Czech Republic	1:20.72	34	DNF			
—	32	Kira Weidle	Germany	1:20.01	27	DSQ			
—	9	Lara Gut	Switzerland	1:17.33	3	DNS			
—	40	Noelle Barahona	Chile	1:21.96	37	DNS			
—	25	Kristina Riis-Johannessen	Norway	DNF					
—	34	Alexandra Coletti	Monaco	DNF					
—	8	Tina Weirather	Liechtenstein	DNS					
—	39	Breezy Johnson	United States	DNS					

- Between runs, Lara Gut injured her left knee (ACL, meniscus), which ended her season.
