= FIS Alpine World Ski Championships 2013 – Women's super-G =

Women's super-G at the FIS Alpine World Ski Championships 2013
- Venue: Planai; Schladming, Austria
- Date: 5 February 2013
- Competitors: 59 from 28 nations
- Winning time: 1:35.39

Medalists
gold medal	Tina Maze	Slovenia
silver medal	Lara Gut	Switzerland
bronze medal	Julia Mancuso	United States

The women's super-G competition at the 2013 World Championships was held on Tuesday, February 5, with 59 athletes from 28 countries entered. The first race of the championships, it was scheduled for an 11:00 (CET) start. Due to marginal weather, the start was delayed in 15-minute increments until 14:30; the race was called completed after just 30 finishers (36 athletes), due to fog.

World Cup overall leader Tina Maze won the world title, with Lara Gut and Julia Mancuso on the podium.

Lindsey Vonn was involved in a severe crash midway through the course and was airlifted to a nearby hospital. She tore her anterior cruciate ligament and medial collateral ligament in her right knee and sustained a lateral tibial plateau fracture.

== Results ==
The race was started at 14:30.

Rank	Bib	Name	Country	Time	Difference
1st place, gold medalist(s)	18	Tina Maze	Slovenia	1:35.39	
2nd place, silver medalist(s)	13	Lara Gut	Switzerland	1:35.77	+0.38
3rd place, bronze medalist(s)	22	Julia Mancuso	United States	1:35.91	+0.52
4	33	Sofia Goggia	Italy	1:35.96	+0.57
5	17	Fabienne Suter	Switzerland	1:36.25	+0.86
6	4	Ilka Štuhec	Slovenia	1:36.28	+0.89
7	27	Daniela Merighetti	Italy	1:36.32	+0.93
8	16	Viktoria Rebensburg	Germany	1:36.33	+0.94
9	11	Andrea Fischbacher	Austria	1:36.40	+1.01
10	8	Dominique Gisin	Switzerland	1:36.57	+1.18
11	1	Nicole Schmidhofer	Austria	1:36.64	+1.25
11	10	Elisabeth Görgl	Austria	1:36.64	+1.25
13	6	Lotte Smiseth Sejersted	Norway	1:36.85	+1.46
14	3	Marie Marchand-Arvier	France	1:37.02	+1.63
15	2	Jessica Lindell-Vikarby	Sweden	1:37.07	+1.68
16	14	Leanne Smith	United States	1:37.08	+1.69
17	28	Regina Sterz	Austria	1:37.09	+1.70
18	9	Elena Curtoni	Italy	1:37.12	+1.73
19	15	Fränzi Aufdenblatten	Switzerland	1:37.36	+1.97
20	26	Carolina Ruiz Castillo	Spain	1:37.58	+2.19
21	31	Nadia Fanchini	Italy	1:37.63	+2.24
22	25	Marion Rolland	France	1:37.90	+2.51
23	34	Larisa Yurkiw	Canada	1:38.14	+2.75
24	32	Chemmy Alcott	Great Britain	1:38.18	+2.79
25	36	Klara Krizova	Czech Republic	1:38.22	+2.83
26	7	Laurenne Ross	United States	1:38.37	+2.98
27	24	Tessa Worley	France	1:38.73	+3.34
28	5	Marie-Pier Préfontaine	Canada	1:38.88	+3.49
29	35	Maria Bedareva	Russia	1:39.64	+4.25
30	30	Lena Dürr	Germany	1:39.66	+4.27
	37	Sara Hector	Sweden	DNS	
	38	Anastasia Kedrina	Russia	DNS	
	39	Alexandra Coletti	Monaco	DNS	
	40	Elena Yakovishina	Russia	DNS	
	41	Aleksandra Prokopyeva	Russia	DNS	
	42	Greta Small	Australia	DNS	
	43	Edit Miklós	Hungary	DNS	
	44	Karolina Chrapek	Poland	DNS	
	45	Agnieszka Gąsienica-Daniel	Poland	DNS	
	46	Macarena Simari Birkner	Argentina	DNS	
	47	María Belén Simari Birkner	Argentina	DNS	
	48	Maria Kirkova	Bulgaria	DNS	
	49	Isabel van Buynder	Belgium	DNS	
	50	Saša Tršinski	Croatia	DNS	
	51	Maria Shkanova	Belarus	DNS	
	52	Maryna Gasienica Daniel	Poland	DNS	
	53	Piera Hudson	New Zealand	DNS	
	54	Kristina Saalová	Slovakia	DNS	
	55	Andrea Komšić	Croatia	DNS	
	56	Anna Berecz	Hungary	DNS	
	57	Bogdana Matsotska	Ukraine	DNS	
	58	Tetyana Tikun	Ukraine	DNS	
	59	Lyudmila Fedotova	Kazakhstan	DNS	
	12	Tina Weirather	Liechtenstein	DNF	
	19	Lindsey Vonn	United States	DNF	
	20	Maria Höfl-Riesch	Germany	DNF	
	21	Anna Fenninger	Austria	DNF	
	23	Ragnhild Mowinckel	Norway	DNF	
	29	Veronique Hronek	Germany	DNF	
