= FIS Alpine World Ski Championships 2015 – Women's super-G =

Women's super-G at the FIS Alpine World Ski Championships 2015
- Venue: Raptor; Beaver Creek, Colorado, U.S.
- Date: February 3, 2015
- Competitors: 46 from 21 nations
- Winning time: 1:10.29

Medalists
gold medal	Anna Fenninger	Austria
silver medal	Tina Maze	Slovenia
bronze medal	Lindsey Vonn	United States

The women's super-G competition at the 2015 World Championships was held on Tuesday, February 3.

== Results ==
The race was scheduled to start at 11:00 MST, but was delayed 30 minutes due to strong winds.

The start was lowered 74 meters (243 ft) to 3,246 m (10,650 ft), shortening the course by 200 m (220 yd). The reduced course had a vertical drop of 516 m (1,693 ft) and a length of 1.640 km (1.02 mi).

Gold medalist Anna Fenninger's average speed was 84.0 km/h (52.2 mph).

Rank	Bib	Name	Country	Time	Diff.
1st place, gold medalist(s)	22	Anna Fenninger	Austria	1:10.29	—
2nd place, silver medalist(s)	19	Tina Maze	Slovenia	1:10.32	+0.03
3rd place, bronze medalist(s)	18	Lindsey Vonn	United States	1:10.44	+0.15
4	15	Cornelia Hütter	Austria	1:10.55	+0.26
5	10	Viktoria Rebensburg	Germany	1:11.07	+0.78
6	20	Tina Weirather	Liechtenstein	1:11.32	+1.03
7	16	Lara Gut	Switzerland	1:11.57	+1.28
8	13	Kajsa Kling	Sweden	1:11.76	+1.47
9	11	Julia Mancuso	United States	1:11.94	+1.65
10	2	Elena Curtoni	Italy	1:11.97	+1.68
11	29	Veronique Hronek	Germany	1:12.11	+1.82
12	12	Nadia Fanchini	Italy	1:12.17	+1.88
13	14	Stacey Cook	United States	1:12.22	+1.93
14	1	Marie Marchand-Arvier	France	1:12.27	+1.98
15	28	Laurenne Ross	United States	1:12.30	+2.01
16	5	Priska Nufer	Switzerland	1:12.39	+2.10
17	6	Ilka Štuhec	Slovenia	1:12.49	+2.20
18	3	Francesca Marsaglia	Italy	1:12.62	+2.33
19	26	Valérie Grenier	Canada	1:12.66	+2.37
20	8	Ragnhild Mowinckel	Norway	1:12.69	+2.40
21	23	Carolina Ruiz Castillo	Spain	1:12.71	+2.42
22	7	Fabienne Suter	Switzerland	1:12.75	+2.46
23	30	Margot Bailet	France	1:13.18	+2.89
24	24	Tessa Worley	France	1:13.40	+3.11
25	32	Maria Therese Tviberg	Norway	1:13.47	+3.18
26	4	Jennifer Piot	France	1:13.78	+3.49
27	35	Vanja Brodnik	Slovenia	1:14.25	+3.96
28	25	Larisa Yurkiw	Canada	1:14.37	+4.08
29	37	Greta Small	Australia	1:15.14	+4.85
30	39	Leona Popović	Croatia	1:15.28	+4.99
31	31	Klára Křížová	Czech Republic	1:15.36	+5.07
32	42	Kateřina Pauláthová	Czech Republic	1:15.55	+5.26
33	40	Noelle Barahona	Chile	1:15.74	+5.45
34	38	Maryna Gąsienica-Daniel	Poland	1:16.26	+5.97
35	45	Bohdana Matsotska	Ukraine	1:16.73	+6.44
36	34	Andrea Komšić	Croatia	1:16.91	+6.62
37	36	Macarena Simari Birkner	Argentina	1:18.18	+7.89
38	43	Tetyana Tikun	Ukraine	1:19.16	+8.87
39	44	María Belén Simari Birkner	Argentina	1:19.34	+9.05
	9	Daniela Merighetti	Italy	DNF	
	17	Nicole Hosp	Austria	DNF	
	21	Elisabeth Görgl	Austria	DNF	
	27	Marie-Michèle Gagnon	Canada	DNF	
	33	Edit Miklós	Hungary	DNF	
	41	Alexandra Coletti	Monaco	DNF	
	46	Angélica Simari Birkner	Argentina	DNF	
