= FIS Alpine World Ski Championships 2009 – Women's slalom =

Complete results for the Women's Slalom competition at the 2009 World Championships. It was run on February 15, the final race of the championships.

101 athletes from 42 countries competed.

== Results ==
Rank	Name	Country	Run 1	Run 2	Total	Diff.
Gold	Maria Riesch	(Germany)	55.63	56.17	1:51.80	--
Silver	Šárka Záhrobská	(Czech Republic)	55.47	57.10	1:52.57	+0.77
Bronze	Tanja Poutiainen	(Finland)	55.91	56.98	1:52.89	+1.09
4	Denise Karbon	(Italy)	55.95	56.95	1:52.90	+1.10
5	Nicole Gius	(Italy)	56.75	56.18	1:52.93	+1.13
6	Denise Feierabend	(Switzerland)	56.46	57.03	1:53.49	+1.69
7	Ana Jelusic	(Croatia)	56.04	57.63	1:53.67	+1.87
8	Fanny Chmelar	(Germany)	56.62	57.14	1:53.76	+1.96
9	Anja Pärson	(Sweden)	57.09	56.69	1:53.78	+1.98
10	Aline Bonjour	(Switzerland)	56.83	57.01	1:53.84	+2.04
11	Sanni Leinonen	(Finland)	55.78	58.26	1:54.04	+2.24
12	Anna Goodman	(Canada)	55.86	58.41	1:54.27	+2.47
13	Nastasia Noens	(France)	57.06	57.23	1:54.29	+2.49
14	Rabea Grand	(Switzerland)	56.01	58.43	1:54.44	+2.64
15	Frida Hansdotter	(Sweden)	55.62	58.86	1:54.48	+2.68
16	Sandra Gini	(Switzerland)	57.42	57.38	1:54.80	+3.00
17	Marusa Ferk	(Slovenia)	57.26	57.94	1:55.20	+3.40
18	Kathrin Hölzl	(Germany)	58.42	57.47	1:55.89	+4.09
19	Resi Stiegler	(United States)	58.21	58.13	1:56.34	+4.54
20	Marina Nigg	(Liechtenstein)	57.56	58.90	1:56.46	+4.66
21	Karen Persyn	(Belgium)	58.42	59.14	1:57.56	+5.76
22	Jelena Lolovic	(Serbia)	59.19	58.82	1:58.01	+6.21
23	Katarzyna Karasinska	(Poland)	59.05	58.98	1:58.03	+6.23
24	Aleksandra Klus	(Poland)	59.15	1:00.52	1:59.67	+7.87
25	Brigitte Acton	(Canada)	56.99	1:10.25	2:07.24	+15.44
26	Sandrine Aubert	(France)	55.40	1:44.97	2:40.37	+48.57
–	Manuela Mölgg	(Italy)	55.00	DSQ	–	–
–	Lindsey Vonn	(United States)	55.24	DNF	–	–
–	Irene Curtoni	(Italy)	56.86	DSQ	–	–
–	Marion Bertrand	(France)	57.66	DSQ	–	–
–	Mizue Hoshi	(Japan)	59.31	–	–	–
–	Sarah Schleper	(United States)	59.33	–	–	–
–	Eva Kurfuerstova	(Czech Republic)	59.60	–	–	–
–	Macarena Simari Birkner	(Argentina)	59.78	–	–	–
–	Elisabeth Görgl	(Austria)	59.88	–	–	–
–	Anna Fenninger	(Austria)	1:00.37	–	–	–
–	Sofija Novoselic	(Croatia)	1:00.62	–	–	–
–	Agnieszka Gasienica Daniel	(Poland)	1:00.94	–	–	–
–	Tii-Maria Romar	(Finland)	1:01.32	–	–	–
–	María Belén Simari Birkner	(Argentina)	1:02.61	–	–	–
–	Sandra-Elena Narea	(Romania)	1:04.42	–	–	–
–	Anastasiya Skryabina	(Ukraine)	1:04.60	–	–	–
–	Noelle Barahona	(Chile)	1:04.90	–	–	–
–	Sophia Ralli	(Greece)	1:06.02	–	–	–
–	Hailey Duke	(United States)	1:07.66	–	–	–
–	Liene Fimbauere	(Latvia)	1:08.48	–	–	–
–	Tugba Dasdemir	(Turkey)	1:09.59	–	–	–
–	Oksana Mashchakevich	(Ukraine)	1:09.85	–	–	–
–	Lyudmila Fedotova	(Kazakhstan)	1:12.97	–	–	–
–	Szelina Hellner	(Hungary)	1:14.23	–	–	–
–	Jacky Chamoun	(Lebanon)	1:20.18	–	–	–
–	Fatemeh Kiadarbandsari	(Iran)	1:21.91	–	–	–
–	Mitra Kalhor	(Iran)	1:22.12	–	–	–
–	Katrine Moller Jensen	(Denmark)	1:30.42	–	–	–
–	Isabel Van Buynder	(Belgium)	DSQ	–	–	–
–	Kristina Krone	(Puerto Rico)	DSQ	–	–	–
–	Marjan Kalhor	(Iran)	DSQ	–	–	–
–	Maria Pietilä Holmner	(Sweden)	DNF	–	–	–
–	Kathrin Zettel	(Austria)	DNF	–	–	–
–	Therese Borssen	(Sweden)	DNF	–	–	–
–	Michaela Kirchgasser	(Austria)	DNF	–	–	–
–	Nika Fleiss	(Croatia)	DNF	–	–	–
–	Susanne Riesch	(Germany)	DNF	–	–	–
–	Nina Løseth	(Norway)	DNF	–	–	–
–	Marie-Michele Gagnon	(Canada)	DNF	–	–	–
–	Lene Løseth	(Norway)	DNF	–	–	–
–	Mona Løseth	(Norway)	DNF	–	–	–
–	Jana Gantnerova	(Slovakia)	DNF	–	–	–
–	Vanja Brodnik	(Slovenia)	DNF	–	–	–
–	Barbora Lukacova	(Slovakia)	DNF	–	–	–
–	Mireia Gutierrez	(Andorra)	DNF	–	–	–
–	Matea Ferk	(Croatia)	DNF	–	–	–
–	Maria Kirkova	(Bulgaria)	DNF	–	–	–
–	Jana Skvarkova	(Slovakia)	DNF	–	–	–
–	Sarah Jarvis	(New Zealand)	DNF	–	–	–
–	Nikol Kucerova	(Czech Republic)	DNF	–	–	–
–	Bogdana Matsotska	(Ukraine)	DNF	–	–	–
–	Marija Trmcic	(Serbia)	DNF	–	–	–
–	Mireia Clemente	(Spain)	DNF	–	–	–
–	Zana Novakovic	(Bosnia and Herzegovina)	DNF	–	–	–
–	Bianca-Andreea Narea	(Romania)	DNF	–	–	–
–	Lizaveta Kuzmenka	(Belarus)	DNF	–	–	–
–	Marija Schkanova	(Belarus)	DNF	–	–	–
–	Maja Klepic	(Bosnia and Herzegovina)	DNF	–	–	–
–	Zsofia Doeme	(Hungary)	DNF	–	–	–
–	Nicol Gastaldi	(Argentina)	DNF	–	–	–
–	Anna Berecz	(Hungary)	DNF	–	–	–
–	Xia Lina	(China)	DNF	–	–	–
–	Julietta Quiroga	(Argentina)	DNF	–	–	–
–	Duygu Ulusoy	(Turkey)	DNF	–	–	–
–	Kristine Poshka	(Latvia)	DNF	–	–	–
–	Cynthia Denzler	(Colombia)	DNF	–	–	–
–	Gaia Bassani Antivari	(Azerbaijan)	DNF	–	–	–
–	Sun Lingling	(China)	DNF	–	–	–
–	Liu Yu	(China)	DNF	–	–	–
–	Tamara Gisem	(Ukraine)	DNF	–	–	–
–	Stephanie Joffroy	(Chile)	DNF	–	–	–
–	Maya Harrisson	(Brazil)	DNF	–	–	–
–	Andrea Araman	(Lebanon)	DNF	–	–	–
–	Marie-Pier Prefontaine	(Canada)	DNS	–	–	–
–	Chirine Njeim	(Lebanon)	DNS	–	–	–
