= FIS Alpine World Ski Championships 2017 – Women's downhill =

Women's downhill at the FIS Alpine World Ski Championships 2017
- Venue: Engiadina, Piz Nair
- Location: St. Moritz, Switzerland
- Dates: 12 February 2017
- Competitors: 38 from 17 nations
- Winning time: 1:32.85

Medalists
gold medal	Ilka Štuhec	Slovenia
silver medal	Stephanie Venier	Austria
bronze medal	Lindsey Vonn	United States

Women's Downhill
- Location: Engiadina; St. Moritz, Switzerland
- Vertical: 705 m (2,313 ft)
- Top elevation: 2,745 m (9,006 ft)
- Base elevation: 2,040 m (6,693 ft)
- Longest run: 2.633 km (1.64 mi)

The Women's downhill competition at the 2017 World Championships was held on Sunday, 12 February 2017.

Slovenia's Ilka Štuhec won the gold medal, Stephanie Venier of Austria took the silver, and the bronze medalist was Lindsey Vonn of the United States.

The race course was 2.633 km (1.64 mi) in length, with a vertical drop of 705 m (2,313 ft) from a starting elevation of 2,745 m (9,006 ft) above sea level. Štuhec's winning time of 92.85 seconds yielded an average speed of 102.087 km/h (63.4 mph) and an average vertical descent rate of 7.593 m/s (24.9 ft/s).

== Results ==
The race started at 11:15 CET (UTC+1).

Rank	Bib	Name	Country	Time	Diff
1st place, gold medalist(s)	7	Ilka Štuhec	Slovenia	1:32.85	—
2nd place, silver medalist(s)	6	Stephanie Venier	Austria	1:33.25	+0.40
3rd place, bronze medalist(s)	9	Lindsey Vonn	United States	1:33.30	+0.45
4	5	Sofia Goggia	Italy	1:33.37	+0.52
5	4	Laurenne Ross	United States	1:33.57	+0.72
6	10	Christine Scheyer	Austria	1:33.79	+0.94
7	11	Fabienne Suter	Switzerland	1:33.88	+1.03
8	28	Michelle Gisin	Switzerland	1:33.89	+1.04
9	14	Ramona Siebenhofer	Austria	1:33.97	+1.12
10	3	Tina Weirather	Liechtenstein	1:34.03	+1.18
11	13	Viktoria Rebensburg	Germany	1:34.10	+1.25
12	18	Jasmine Flury	Switzerland	1:34.36	+1.51
12	2	Jacqueline Wiles	United States	1:34.36	+1.51
14	8	Elena Fanchini	Italy	1:34.39	+1.54
15	16	Breezy Johnson	United States	1:34.49	+1.64
16	1	Nicole Schmidhofer	Austria	1:34.61	+1.76
17	17	Kajsa Kling	Sweden	1:34.64	+1.79
18	19	Corinne Suter	Switzerland	1:34.65	+1.80
19	20	Verena Stuffer	Italy	1:34.81	+1.96
20	12	Ragnhild Mowinckel	Norway	1:34.91	+2.06
21	24	Ester Ledecká	Czech Republic	1:34.96	+2.11
22	15	Johanna Schnarf	Italy	1:35.05	+2.20
23	23	Maruša Ferk	Slovenia	1:35.23	+2.38
24	22	Kristin Lysdahl	Norway	1:35.26	+2.41
25	25	Tiffany Gauthier	France	1:35.39	+2.54
25	21	Maria Therese Tviberg	Norway	1:35.39	+2.54
27	32	Aleksandra Prokopyeva	Russia	1:35.46	+2.61
28	30	Alexandra Coletti	Monaco	1:35.53	+2.68
29	31	Kristina Riis-Johannessen	Norway	1:35.72	+2.87
29	29	Kira Weidle	Germany	1:35.72	+2.87
31	26	Romane Miradoli	France	1:35.84	+2.99
32	27	Valérie Grenier	Canada	1:35.86	+3.01
33	33	Lisa Hörnblad	Sweden	1:36.69	+3.84
34	35	Pavla Klicnarová	Czech Republic	1:37.87	+5.02
35	34	Kateřina Pauláthová	Czech Republic	1:38.02	+5.17
36	36	Noelle Barahona	Chile	1:38.59	+5.74
37	38	Macarena Simari Birkner	Argentina	1:39.08	+6.23
38	37	Sarah Schleper	Mexico	1:42.59	+9.74
