= Aurélie Revillet =

French alpine skier (born 1986)

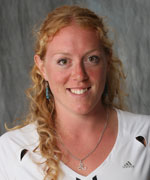

Personal information
- Nationality: French
- Born: 13 February 1986 (age 39); Moûtiers, Savoie, France
- Height: 173 cm (5 ft 8 in)
- Weight: 73 kg (161 lb)

Sport
- Country: France
- Sport: Skiing
- Event: Alpine Skiing

Achievements and titles
- Olympic finals: 2010 Winter Olympics: Downhill–17

Aurélie Revillet (born 13 February 1986 in Moûtiers) is a French skier and soldier.

Revillet represented France in the 2010 Winter Olympics, in the Alpine skiing events. She also took part in the FIS Alpine World Ski Championships 2009.

== Results ==
FIS Alpine World Ski Championships 2009:
Super-G–24
2010 Winter Olympics:
Downhill–17
