= FIS Alpine World Ski Championships 2009 – Women's giant slalom =

These are the complete results for the Women's Giant Slalom competition at the 2009 Alpine World Ski Championships. It was run on February 12, the seventh race of the championships.

| Rank | Name | Country | Run 1 | Run 2 | Total | Diff. |
|---|---|---|---|---|---|---|
| Gold | Kathrin Hölzl | (Germany) | 1:00.21 | 1:03.28 | 2:03.49 | -- |
| Silver | Tina Maze | (Slovenia) | 1:01.54 | 1:02.04 | 2:03.58 | +0.09 |
| Bronze | Tanja Poutiainen | (Finland) | 0:59.93 | 1:04.10 | 2:04.03 | +0.54 |
| 4 | Denise Karbon | (Italy) | 1:00.92 | 1:03.24 | 2:04.16 | +0.67 |
| 5 | Michaela Kirchgasser | (Austria) | 1:00.80 | 1:03.42 | 2:04.22 | +0.73 |
| 6 | Kathrin Zettel | (Austria) | 0:59.53 | 1:04.78 | 2:04.31 | +0.82 |
| 7 | Tessa Worley | (France) | 1:00.45 | 1:04.18 | 2:04.63 | +1.14 |
| 8 | Maria Pietilä-Holmner | (Sweden) | 1:01.46 | 1:03.25 | 2:04.71 | +1.22 |
| 9 | Viktoria Rebensburg | (Germany) | 1:00.10 | 1:04.64 | 2:04.74 | +1.25 |
| 10 | Elisabeth Görgl | (Austria) | 1:01.16 | 1:03.81 | 2:04.97 | +1.48 |
| 11 | Taïna Barioz | (France) | 1:01.24 | 1:04.12 | 2:05.36 | +1.87 |
| 12 | Mateja Robnik | (Slovenia) | 1:01.04 | 1:04.61 | 2:05.65 | +2.16 |
| 13 | Olivia Bertrand | (France) | 1:02.88 | 1:02.78 | 2:05.66 | +2.17 |
| 14 | Ana Drev | (Slovenia) | 1:01.80 | 1:04.20 | 2:06.00 | +2.51 |
| 15 | Anja Pärson | (Sweden) | 1:00.97 | 1:05.08 | 2:06.05 | +2.56 |
| 16 | Šárka Záhrobská | (Czech Republic) | 1:02.54 | 1:03.72 | 2:06.26 | +2.77 |
| 17 | Marion Bertrand | (France) | 1:03.64 | 1:02.76 | 2:06.40 | +2.91 |
| 18 | Julia Mancuso | (United States) | 1:02.64 | 1:04.09 | 2:06.73 | +3.24 |
| 19 | Lene Løseth | (Norway) | 1:03.00 | 1:03.91 | 2:06.91 | +3.42 |
| 20 | Karen Putzer | (Italy) | 1:03.01 | 1:03.91 | 2:06.92 | +3.43 |
| 21 | Sanni Leinonen | (Finland) | 1:02.72 | 1:04.34 | 2:07.06 | +3.57 |
| 22 | Andrea Dettling | (Switzerland) | 1:03.01 | 1:04.31 | 2:07.32 | +3.83 |
| 23 | Nicole Hosp | (Austria) | 1:03.63 | 1:04.00 | 2:07.63 | +4.14 |
| 24 | Andrea Fischbacher | (Austria) | 1:03.58 | 1:04.14 | 2:07.72 | +4.23 |
| 25 | Jelena Lolović | (Serbia) | 1:03.46 | 1:04.51 | 2:07.97 | +4.48 |
| 26 | Britt Janyk | (Canada) | 1:03.50 | 1:04.79 | 2:08.29 | +4.80 |
| 27 | Maruša Ferk | (Slovenia) | 1:02.87 | 1:06.09 | 2:08.96 | +5.47 |
| 28 | Maria Riesch | (Germany) | 1:01.26 | 1:13.91 | 2:15.17 | +11.68 |
| 29 | Chemmy Alcott | (United Kingdom) | 1:01.68 | 1:24.10 | 2:25.78 | +22.29 |
| 30 | Veronica Smedh | (Sweden) | 1:04.20 | – | 1:04.20 | – |
| 31 | Sarah Schleper | (United States) | 1:04.65 | – | 1:04.65 | – |
| 32 | Nika Fleiss | (Croatia) | 1:04.79 | – | 1:04.79 | – |
| 33 | Agnieszka Gasienica Daniel | (Poland) | 1:04.90 | – | 1:04.90 | – |
| 34 | Maria Kirkova | (Bulgaria) | 1:05.17 | – | 1:05.17 | – |
| 35 | Marie-Pier Prefontaine | (Canada) | 1:05.64 | – | 1:05.64 | – |
| 36 | Katarzyna Karasinska | (Poland) | 1:05.95 | – | 1:05.95 | – |
| 37 | Macarena Simari Birkner | (Argentina) | 1:06.18 | – | 1:06.18 | – |
| 38 | María Belén Simari Birkner | (Argentina) | 1:07.08 | – | 1:07.08 | – |
| 39 | Anna Berecz | (Hungary) | 1:07.43 | – | 1:07.43 | – |
| 40 | Andrea Jardi | (Spain) | 1:07.64 | – | 1:07.64 | – |
| 41 | Zsofia Doeme | (Hungary) | 1:08.01 | – | 1:08.01 | – |
| 42 | Bogdana Matsotska | (Ukraine) | 1:08.60 | – | 1:08.60 | – |
| 43 | Aleksandra Klus | (Poland) | 1:09.76 | – | 1:09.76 | – |
| 44 | Maya Harrisson | (Brazil) | 1:10.19 | – | 1:10.19 | – |
| 45 | Bianca-Andreea Narea | (Romania) | 1:10.31 | – | 1:10.31 | – |
| 46 | Sophia Ralli | (Greece) | 1:12.47 | – | 1:12.47 | – |
| 47 | Isabel van Buynder | (Belgium) | 1:12.82 | – | 1:12.82 | – |
| 48 | Liene Fimbauere | (Latvia) | 1:13.08 | – | 1:13.08 | – |
| 49 | Julietta Quiroga | (Argentina) | 1:13.15 | – | 1:13.15 | – |
| 50 | Lyudmila Fedotova | (Kazakhstan) | 1:14.73 | – | 1:14.73 | – |
| 51 | Gaia Bassani Antivari | (Azerbaijan) | 1:15.29 | – | 1:15.29 | – |
| 52 | Tugba Dasdemir | (Turkey) | 1:15.31 | – | 1:15.31 | – |
| 53 | Sophie Fjellvang-Sølling | (Denmark) | 1:16.27 | – | 1:16.27 | – |
| 54 | Noelle Barahona | (Chile) | 1:16.38 | – | 1:16.38 | – |
| 55 | Anna Bondare | (Latvia) | 1:17.29 | – | 1:17.29 | – |
| 56 | Andrea Araman | (Lebanon) | 1:19.52 | – | 1:19.52 | – |
| 57 | Katrin Møller Jensen | (Denmark) | 1:23.89 | – | 1:23.89 | – |
| 58 | Mitra Kalhor | (Iran) | 1:23.98 | – | 1:23.98 | – |
| 59 | Kristine Poshka | (Latvia) | 1:25.65 | – | 1:25.65 | – |
| 60 | Marjan Kalhor | (Iran) | 1:29.34 | – | 1:29.34 | – |
| – | Sofija Novoselić | (Croatia) | DQ | – | – | – |
| – | Žana Novaković | (Bosnia and Herzegovina) | DQ | – | – | – |
| – | Sandra-Elena Narea | (Romania) | DQ | – | – | – |
| – | Ana Jelušić | (Croatia) | DNS | – | – | – |
| – | Veronika Zuzulova | (Slovakia) | DNS | – | – | – |
| – | Chirine Njeim | (Lebanon) | DNS | – | – | – |
| – | Du Juanjuan | (China) | DNS | – | – | – |
| – | Nicole Gius | (Italy) | 1:00.46 | DNF | – | – |
| – | Manuela Mölgg | (Italy) | DNF | – | – | – |
| – | Lara Gut | (Switzerland) | DNF | – | – | – |
| – | Geneviève Simard | (Canada) | DNF | – | – | – |
| – | Aline Bonjour | (Switzerland) | DNF | – | – | – |
| – | Megan McJames | (United States) | DNF | – | – | – |
| – | Marie-Michele Gagnon | (Canada) | DNF | – | – | – |
| – | Frida Hansdotter | (Sweden) | DNF | – | – | – |
| – | Rabea Grand | (Switzerland) | DNF | – | – | – |
| – | Lucie Hrstková | (Czech Republic) | DNF | – | – | – |
| – | Mizue Hoshi | (Japan) | DNF | – | – | – |
| – | Jana Skvarková | (Slovakia) | DNF | – | – | – |
| – | Barbora Lucaková | (Slovakia) | DNF | – | – | – |
| – | Mireia Clemente | (Spain) | DNF | – | – | – |
| – | Anastasiya Skryabina | (Ukraine) | DNF | – | – | – |
| – | Marija Schkanova | (Belarus) | DNF | – | – | – |
| – | Lizaveta Kuzmenka | (Belarus) | DNF | – | – | – |
| – | Nicol Castaldi | (Argentina) | DNF | – | – | – |
| – | Cynthia Denzler | (Colombia) | DNF | – | – | – |
| – | Tamara Gisem | (Ukraine) | DNF | – | – | – |
| – | Kristina Krone | (Puerto Rico) | DNF | – | – | – |
| – | Xia Lina | (China) | DNF | – | – | – |
| – | Stephanie Joffroy | (Chile) | DNF | – | – | – |
| – | Sun Lingling | (China) | DNF | – | – | – |
| – | Oksana Mashchakevich | (Ukraine) | DNF | – | – | – |
| – | Maja Klepić | (Bosnia and Herzegovina) | DNF | – | – | – |
| – | Duygu Ulusoy | (Turkey) | DNF | – | – | – |
| – | Liu Yu | (China) | DNF | – | – | – |
| – | Ketija Kleinshmite | (Latvia) | DNF | – | – | – |
| – | Jacky Chamoun | (Lebanon) | DNF | – | – | – |
| – | Fatemeh Kiadarbandsari | (Iran) | DNF | – | – | – |
