= Alpine skiing at the 2010 Winter Olympics – Women's combined =

Women's combined at the XXI Olympic Winter Games
- Alpine skiing
- Venue: Whistler Creekside; Whistler, British Columbia; Canada
- Date: February 18, 2010
- Competitors: 35 from 19 nations
- Winning time: 2:09.14

Medalists
1st place, gold medalist(s)		Maria Riesch	Germany
2nd place, silver medalist(s)		Julia Mancuso	United States
3rd place, bronze medalist(s)		Anja Pärson	Sweden

The women's super combined competition of the Vancouver 2010 Olympics was held at Whistler Creekside in Whistler, British Columbia, on February 18, 2010. The competition was originally scheduled to be held on February 14, 2010, but was postponed due to bad weather, which delayed previous events.

One major change in this event for the 2010 Olympics was the switch from a traditional dedicated "combined" (K), taking place over one or two days and involving a downhill run and two slalom runs (as the combined had been since its reintroduction to the Olympics in 1988), to a one-day "super combined" (SC), consisting of a downhill run in the morning and one slalom run in the afternoon.

== Results ==
Rank	Bib	Name	Nation	Downhill	Rank	Slalom	Rank	Total	Differential
1st place, gold medalist(s)	19	Maria Riesch	Germany	1:24.49	2	44.65	7	2:09.14	
2nd place, silver medalist(s)	3	Julia Mancuso	United States	1:24.96	3	45.12	9	2:10.08	+0.94
3rd place, bronze medalist(s)	21	Anja Pärson	Sweden	1:25.57	7	44.62	6	2:10.19	+1.05
4	20	Kathrin Zettel	Austria	1:26.01	11	44.49	4	2:10.50	+1.36
5	4	Tina Maze	Slovenia	1:25.97	10	44.56	5	2:10.53	+1.39
6	22	Fabienne Suter	Switzerland	1:25.29	4	45.56	11	2:10.85	+1.71
7	12	Šárka Záhrobská	Czech Republic	1:27.33	22	43.69	1	2:11.02	+1.88
8	8	Johanna Schnarf	Italy	1:25.72	9	45.57	12	2:11.29	+2.15
9	17	Michaela Kirchgasser	Austria	1:27.09	19	44.26	2	2:11.35	+2.21
10	9	Marie Marchand-Arvier	France	1:25.41	5	46.41	18	2:11.82	+2.68
11	13	Chemmy Alcott	Great Britain	1:27.06	18	45.45	10	2:12.51	+3.37
12	26	Shona Rubens	Canada	1:26.90	17	45.68	13	2:12.58	+3.44
13	27	Mona Løseth	Norway	1:27.72	24	44.96	8	2:12.68	+3.54
14	11	Emily Brydon	Canada	1:26.49	15	46.27	17	2:12.76	+3.62
15	14	Maruša Ferk	Slovenia	1:26.15	12	46.83	22	2:12.98	+3.84
16	15	Anna Fenninger	Austria	1:27.19	20	46.08	16	2:13.27	+4.13
17	25	Kaylin Richardson	United States	1:27.64	23	45.76	14	2:13.40	+4.26
18	16	Elisabeth Görgl	Austria	1:25.60	8	47.98	25	2:13.58	+4.44
19	2	Alexandra Coletti	Monaco	1:26.74	16	47.07	23	2:13.81	+4.67
20	30	Sandrine Aubert	France	1:29.50	26	44.46	3	2:13.96	+4.82
21	28	Leanne Smith	United States	1:27.27	21	46.70	20	2:13.97	+4.83
22	29	Jessica Lindell-Vikarby	Sweden	1:26.47	14	47.69	24	2:14.16	+5.02
23	23	Andrea Dettling	Switzerland	1:26.28	13	48.16	26	2:14.44	+5.30
24	24	Mireia Gutiérrez	Andorra	1:29.16	25	46.51	19	2:15.67	+6.53
25	5	Agnieszka Gąsienica-Daniel	Poland	1:30.28	29	45.96	15	2:16.24	+7.10
26	34	Macarena Simari Birkner	Argentina	1:29.56	27	46.81	21	2:16.37	+7.23
27	32	Anna Berecz	Hungary	1:33.47	30	49.50	27	2:22.97	+13.83
28	35	Noelle Barahona	Chile	1:34.05	31	50.20	28	2:24.25	+15.11
	18	Lindsey Vonn	United States	1:24.16	1	DNF			
	10	Gina Stechert	Germany	1:25.44	6	DNF			
	31	María Belén Simari Birkner	Argentina	1:30.19	28	DNF			
	1	Nadja Kamer	Switzerland	DNF					
	6	Elena Prosteva	Russia	DNF					
	7	Daniela Merighetti	Italy	DNF					
	33	Georgia Simmerling	Canada	DNS					
