= FIS Alpine World Ski Championships 2015 – Women's super combined =

Women's super combined at the FIS Alpine World Ski Championships 2015
- Venue: Raptor; Beaver Creek, Colorado, U.S.
- Date: February 9, 2015
- Competitors: 32 from 16 nations
- Winning time: 2:33.37

Medalists
gold medal	Tina Maze	Slovenia
silver medal	Nicole Hosp	Austria
bronze medal	Michaela Kirchgasser	Austria

The Women's super combined competition at the 2015 World Championships was held on Monday, February 9.

== Results ==
The downhill run started at 10:00 local time (UTC−7) and the slalom run at 14:15.

Rank	Bib	Name	Nation	Downhill	Rank	Slalom	Rank	Total	Diff
1st place, gold medalist(s)	17	Tina Maze	Slovenia	1:45.25	1	48.12	5	2:33.37	—
2nd place, silver medalist(s)	21	Nicole Hosp	Austria	1:46.15	4	47.44	2	2:33.59	+0.22
3rd place, bronze medalist(s)	15	Michaela Kirchgasser	Austria	1:46.58	8	47.14	1	2:33.72	+0.35
4	20	Anna Fenninger	Austria	1:45.51	3	48.75	6	2:34.26	+0.67
5	12	Lara Gut	Switzerland	1:45.27	2	49.04	7	2:34.31	+0.93
6	9	Kathrin Zettel	Austria	1:47.00	11	48.01	4	2:35.01	+1.64
7	30	Ilka Štuhec	Slovenia	1:46.39	6	49.41	11	2:35.80	+2.43
8	10	Francesca Marsaglia	Italy	1:46.65	9	49.31	10	2:35.96	+2.59
9	22	Ragnhild Mowinckel	Norway	1:46.32	5	49.66	13	2:35.98	+2.61
10	2	Margot Bailet	France	1:47.49	14	49.10	8	2:36.59	+3.22
11	7	Ana Bucik	Slovenia	1:50.01	24	47.76	3	2:37.77	+4.40
12	6	Vanja Brodnik	Slovenia	1:48.26	20	49.64	12	2:37.90	+4.53
13	8	Veronique Hronek	Germany	1:47.31	12	50.60	17	2:37.91	+4.54
14	14	Laurenne Ross	United States	1:46.71	10	51.30	20	2:38.01	+4.64
15	18	Julia Mancuso	United States	1:47.92	17	50.10	15	2:38.02	+4.65
16	29	Elena Fanchini	Italy	1:47.56	15	51.28	19	2:38.84	+5.47
17	3	Jacqueline Wiles	United States	1:48.13	18	50.95	18	2:39.08	+5.71
18	11	Greta Small	Australia	1:49.01	23	50.38	16	2:39.39	+6.02
19	25	Andrea Komšić	Croatia	1:51.85	26	49.73	14	2:41.28	+7.91
20	26	Klára Křížová	Czech Republic	1:48.69	22	52.84	22	2:41.53	+8.16
21	27	Macarena Simari Birkner	Argentina	1:52.67	27	49.11	9	2:41.78	+8.41
22	1	Noelle Barahona	Chile	1:51.32	25	51.64	21	2:42.94	+9.57
	5	Edit Miklós	Hungary	1:47.76	16	DNS			
	23	Johanna Schnarf	Italy	1:48.53	21	DNS			
	13	Priska Nufer	Switzerland	1:48.22	19	DNF			
	19	Lindsey Vonn	United States	1:46.56	7	DNF			
	24	Maria Therese Tviberg	Norway	1:47.34	13	DNF			
	4	Elena Curtoni	Italy	DNF					
	16	Marie-Michèle Gagnon	Canada	DNF					
	28	Valérie Grenier	Canada	DNF					
	31	Leona Popović	Croatia	DNF					
	32	Alexandra Coletti	Monaco	DNF					
