= Klára Křížová =

Czech alpine skier (born 1989)

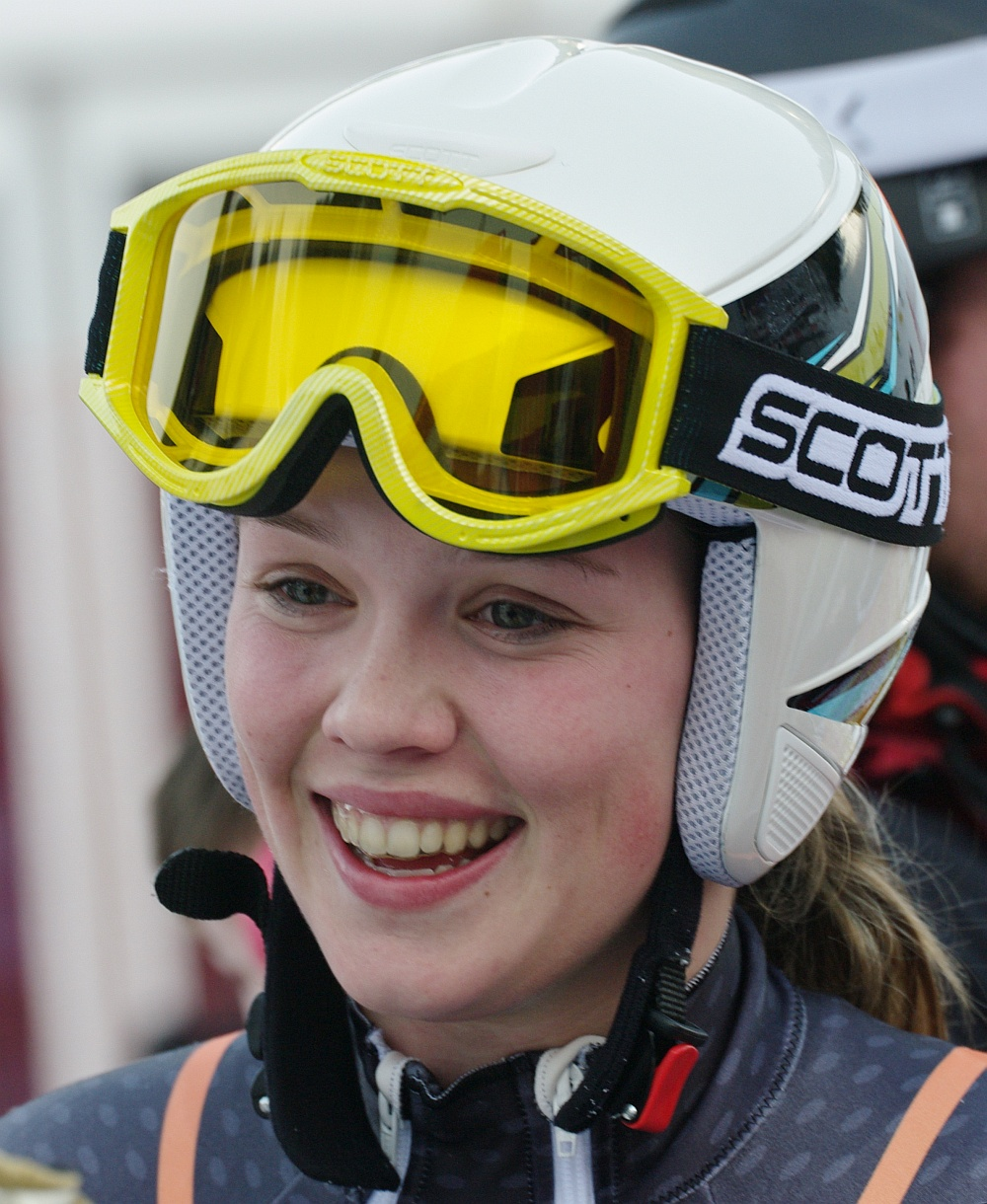

Personal information
- Nationality: Czech
- Born: 13 July 1989 (age 36)
- Height: 179 cm (5 ft 10 in)
- Weight: 77 kg (170 lb)

Sport
- Country: Czech Republic
- Sport: Alpine skiing
- Event(s): Downhill, Super-G, Combined

Achievements and titles
- Olympic finals: 2010 Winter Olympics: Downhill–37; Super-G–29

Klára Křížová (Czech pronunciation: [ˈklaːra kr̝̊iːʒovaː], 13 July 1989) is a female alpine skier from the Czech Republic. She took part in the alpine skiing events at the 2010 Winter Olympics. She also competed in the FIS Alpine World Ski Championships 2009.

Křížová opened the women's downhill in the 2010 Winter Olympics, but suffered a crash, in which she lost a ski pole, following this she was able to finish in 37, placing her as the slowest person to successfully complete the course at 2:09:27. In the women's super-G, she came 29 out of 38 successful finishes.

Results

FIS Alpine World Ski Championships 2009:
Super-G–25
Super combined–25
2010 Winter Olympics:
Downhill–37
Super-G–29
