= 2005 Alpine Skiing World Cup – Women's downhill =

Alpine ski discipline year standings

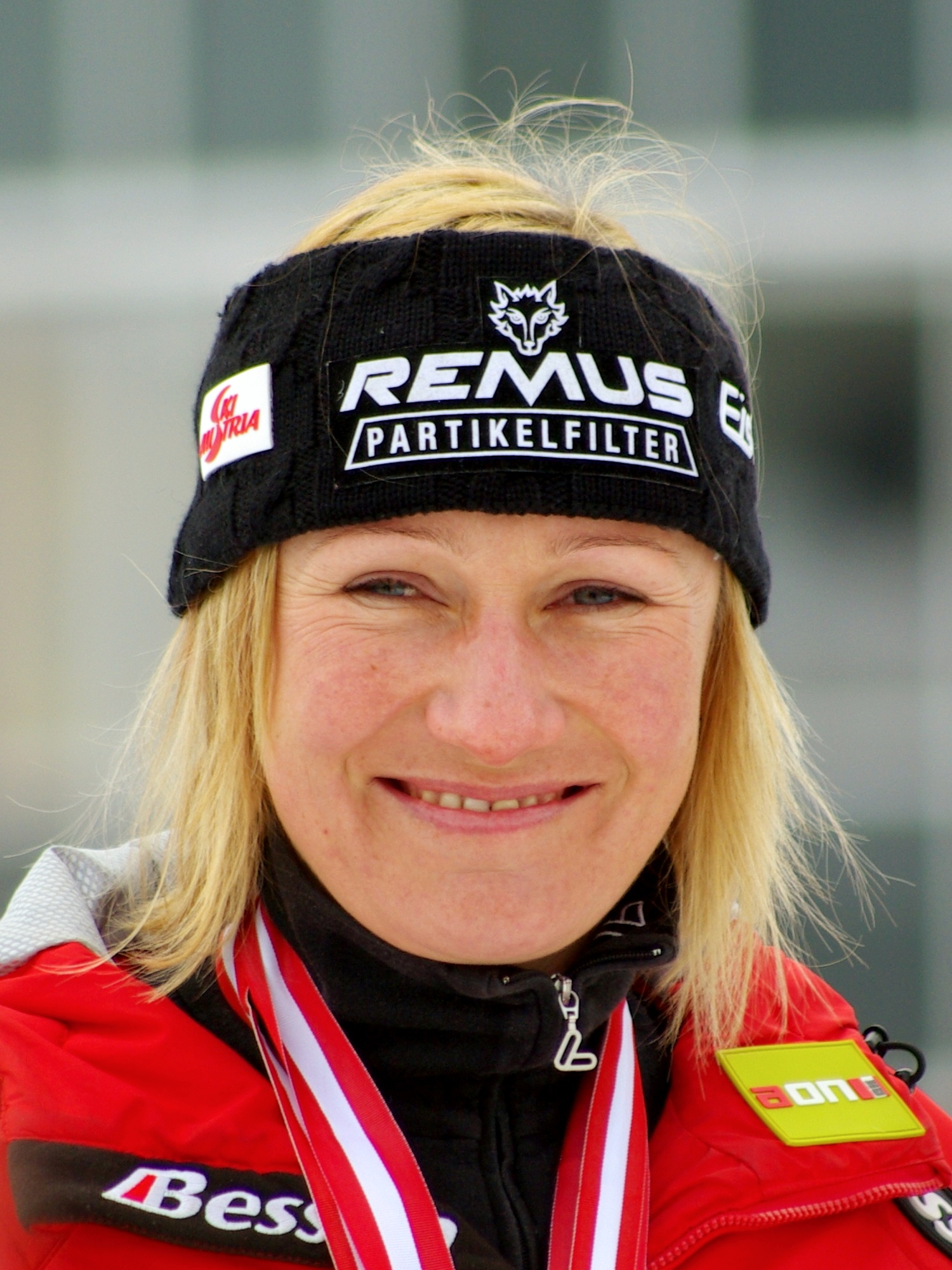
2005 Women's downhill World Cup: Renate Götschl of Austria, season champion; 2005 Women's World Cup; Overall • downhill • super-G; giant slalom • slalom • combined
Previous: 2004	Next: 2006

The women's downhill competition in the 2005 FIS Alpine Skiing World Cup involved eight events, including the World Cup season finals in Lenzerheide, Switzerland. In the finals, generally only the top 25 racers in the discipline (along with skiers having more than 500 points overall and the world juniors champion in the discipline) are eligible to compete, and only the top 15 finishers receive points.

Defending discipline champion Renate Götschl of Austria entered the finals with a 32-point lead over Germany's Hilde Gerg and then clinched her fourth championship in this discipline by winning the finals race, as Gerg finished third.

The season was interrupted by the 2005 World Ski Championships, which were held from 28 January to 13 February in Bormio, Italy. The women's downhill was held on 6 February and was won by Croatia's Janica Kostelić.

== Standings ==
	Venue	3 Dec 2004; Lake Louise	4 Dec 2004; Lake Louise	6 Jan 2005; Santa Caterina	7 Jan 2005; Santa Caterina	15 Jan 2005; Cortina d'Ampezzo	16 Jan 2005; Cortina d'Ampezzo	26 Feb 2005; San Sicario	10 Mar 2005; Lenzerheide	
#	Skier	(Canada)	(Canada)	(Italy)	(Italy)	(Italy)	(Italy)	(Italy)	(Switzerland)	Total
	(Austria) Renate Götschl	45	80	50	80	100	80	32	100	567
2	(Germany) Hilde Gerg	60	100	60	45	50	60	60	60	495
3	(Austria) Michaela Dorfmeister	50	32	100	15	45	100	50	40	432
4	(Croatia) Janica Kostelić	20	26	36	45	80	50	80	50	387
5	(United States) Lindsey Kildow	100	45	80	50	60	13	36	DNF	384
6	(France) Ingrid Jacquemod	18	16	18	100	40	12	14	80	298
7	(France) Carole Montillet	80	60	45	60	12	5	4	18	284
8	(Sweden) Anja Pärson	15	14	1	DNS	2	45	100	32	209
9	(Switzerland) Sylviane Berthod	36	22	40	11	18	40	40	DNS	207
10	(United States) Julia Mancuso	16	0	9	20	14	32	29	50	170
11	(Canada) Caroline Lalive	29	29	26	32	22	20	8	0	166
12	(Canada) Emily Brydon	DNF	13	15	26	DNF	36	45	20	155
13	(Germany) Petra Haltmayr	40	36	0	36	10	3	DNS	29	154
14	(Italy) Isolde Kostner	32	40	29	18	16	15	DNF	DNF	150
15	(United States) Kirsten Clark	11	11	22	22	32	26	0	24	148
16	(Sweden) Janette Hargin	13	18	0	29	29	20	6	0	115
17	(Austria) Brigitte Obermoser	24	50	10	0	0	0	12	16	112
18	(Austria) Katja Wirth	22	24	32	16	4	9	1	DNF	108
19	(Italy) Daniela Ceccarelli	5	10	13	7	0	6	26	36	103
20	(Switzerland) Nadia Styger	DNS	0	11	13	36	10	20	0	90
21	(Austria) Alexandra Meissnitzer	0	DNF	22	8	26	29	0	DNF	85
22	(Switzerland) Fränzi Aufdenblatten	26	0	0	DNS	15	24	2	0	67
23	(United States) Bryna McCarty	14	20	0	2	0	8	15	0	59
24	(Sweden) Jessica Lindell-Vikarby	0	9	0	0	22	22	DNF	0	53
	(Austria) Astrid Vierthaler	3	0	4	9	13	11	13	DNS	53
26	(United States) Jonna Mendes	12	2	12	0	8	0	16	NE	50
27	(Germany) Maria Riesch	DNS		24	24	DNS			NE	48
28	(Austria) Karin Blaser	7	0	0	DNF	24	14	DNS	NE	45
29	(Germany) Martina Ertl	DNS		3	10	DNS			26	39
30	(Austria) Marlies Schild	7	DNS	0	DNS			5	22	34
31	(Slovenia) Tina Maze	0	DNS	7	DNS			24	DNS	31
32	(Italy) Elena Fanchini	DNS		14	14	0	0	DNS	NE	28
33	(Canada) Kelly VanderBeek	0	12	0	DNS	5	7	3	NE	27
34	(Germany) Isabelle Huber	0	0	0	3	7	16	DNS	NE	26
	(Austria) Elisabeth Görgl	DNF	3	16	DNF	0	DNS	7	DNF	26
36	(Italy) Lucia Recchia	5	DNS					20	NE	25
37	(France) Marion Rolland	0	0	DNS				22	NE	22
38	(Italy) Barbara Kleon	10	9	DNS					NE	19
	(Switzerland) Monika Dumermuth	2	6	6	5	DNS		DNF	NE	19
40	(France) Magda Mattel	0	0	0	0	7	0	11	NE	18
41	(Canada) Mélanie Turgeon	1	15	DNS					NE	16
42	(Switzerland) Catherine Borghi	9	5	0	DNS				NE	14
	(United Kingdom) Chemmy Alcott	0	2	0	12	0	DNS	0	NE	14
	(Austria) Kathrin Wilhelm	8	0	0	6	0	0	0	NE	14
45	(France) Marie Marchand-Arvier	DNS		0	0	9	4	DNS	NE	13
	(France) Julie Duvillard	0	0	2	1	0	0	10	NE	13
47	(Austria) Andrea Fischbacher	DNS				11	DNS		NE	11
48	(Switzerland) Ella Alpiger	0	0	0	0	0	DNF	9	NE	9
49	(Italy) Nadia Fanchini	0	0	8	0	DNS			DNF	8
50	(Canada) Anne-Marie LeFrançois	0	7	0	DNF	DNF	0	DNS	NE	7
	(Austria) Selina Heregger	0	4	DSQ	0	1	2	0	NE	7
52	(Switzerland) Carmen Casanova	DNS		5	DNF	DNS		0	NE	5
53	(Switzerland) Martina Schild	0	0	0	4	0	DNS	0	NE	4
	(Germany) Regina Häusl	0	0	0	0	4	0	DNS	NE	4
55	(Italy) Wendy Siorpaes	DNS		0	0	0	1	DNS	NE	1
	References									

- Winner
- 2nd place
- 3rd place
- DNF = Did not finish
- DSQ = Disqualified
- DNS = Did not start
- NE = Not eligible for finals
- Updated at 13 March 2005, after all events.

== See also ==
- 2005 Alpine Skiing World Cup – Women's summary rankings
- 2005 Alpine Skiing World Cup – Women's overall
- 2005 Alpine Skiing World Cup – Women's super-G
- 2005 Alpine Skiing World Cup – Women's giant slalom
- 2005 Alpine Skiing World Cup – Women's slalom
- 2005 Alpine Skiing World Cup – Women's combined
