= 2005 Alpine Skiing World Cup – Women's giant slalom =

2005 Women's giant slalom World Cup
| Previous: 2004 | Next: 2006 |

Women's giant slalom World Cup 2004/2005

== Final point standings ==
In women's giant slalom World Cup 2004/05 all results count.

| Place | Name | Country | Total points | 1 (Austria) | 2 (United States) | 11 (Switzerland) | 12 (Austria) | 16 (Italy) | 23 (Slovenia) | 26 (Sweden) | 33 (Switzerland) |
|---|---|---|---|---|---|---|---|---|---|---|---|
| 1 | Tanja Poutiainen | Finland | 461 | 80 | 100 | 45 | 80 | 40 | 36 | - | 80 |
| 2 | Anja Pärson | Sweden | 410 | 100 | 80 | 80 | - | 40 | 50 | 60 | - |
| 3 | María José Rienda Contreras | Spain | 384 | 60 | - | 60 | 40 | - | 24 | 100 | 100 |
| 4 | Tina Maze | Slovenia | 366 | - | 20 | 100 | 8 | 100 | 100 | 16 | 22 |
| 5 | Geneviève Simard | Canada | 241 | 7 | 14 | 26 | 16 | 80 | 22 | 36 | 40 |
| 6 | Nicole Hosp | Austria | 238 | 29 | - | 24 | - | - | 45 | 80 | 60 |
| 7 | Martina Ertl | Germany | 230 | 45 | 45 | 4 | 26 | - | 60 | 14 | 36 |
| | Julia Mancuso | United States | 230 | 16 | - | 40 | - | 50 | 45 | 50 | 29 |
| 9 | Karen Putzer | Italy | 226 | 26 | 29 | 50 | - | 15 | 80 | 8 | 18 |
| 10 | Elisabeth Görgl | Austria | 225 | 20 | 26 | - | 60 | 24 | - | 45 | 50 |
| 11 | Janica Kostelić | Croatia | 212 | 32 | 60 | - | 45 | 9 | 10 | 24 | 32 |
| 12 | Michaela Dorfmeister | Austria | 181 | 36 | 9 | 36 | 24 | 32 | 15 | 29 | - |
| 13 | Anna Ottosson | Sweden | 173 | 40 | 11 | 32 | 22 | 16 | 32 | 20 | - |
| 14 | Allison Forsyth | Canada | 152 | - | 24 | - | 10 | 60 | 26 | 32 | - |
| 15 | Marlies Schild | Austria | 150 | - | 50 | - | 100 | - | - | - | - |
| 16 | Renate Götschl | Austria | 145 | - | 32 | 22 | - | - | 6 | 40 | 45 |
| 17 | Sonja Nef | Switzerland | 135 | 22 | 13 | 18 | 29 | 45 | 8 | - | - |
| 18 | Kathrin Zettel | Austria | 98 | - | 16 | - | 15 | 26 | 7 | 10 | 24 |
| 19 | Gail Kelly | Canada | 92 | 24 | 12 | - | - | 13 | 16 | 9 | 18 |
| 20 | Sarah Schleper | United States | 86 | - | - | 16 | 50 | - | 9 | 11 | - |
| | Eveline Rohregger | Austria | 86 | 12 | 18 | 12 | 20 | 6 | 13 | 5 | - |
| 22 | Nicole Gius | Italy | 85 | 11 | 15 | 9 | 18 | 32 | - | - | - |
| 23 | Kristina Koznick | United States | 77 | 50 | 7 | - | - | - | 5 | 15 | - |
| 24 | Ingrid Jacquemod | France | 73 | - | 10 | 15 | - | - | - | 22 | 26 |
| 25 | Michaela Kirchgasser | Austria | 70 | - | - | 14 | 36 | 20 | - | - | - |
| 26 | Manuela Mölgg | Italy | 68 | - | - | 8 | 32 | 14 | 12 | 2 | - |
| 27 | Alexandra Meissnitzer | Austria | 67 | - | 22 | 7 | 14 | 12 | - | 12 | - |
| | Nadia Fanchini | Italy | 67 | 5 | - | - | - | 24 | 18 | - | 20 |
| 29 | Karina Birkelund | Norway | 65 | 13 | 4 | 29 | 11 | 8 | - | - | - |
| 30 | Marlies Oester | Switzerland | 57 | - | 36 | 5 | 5 | - | 11 | - | - |
| 31 | Maria Pietilä-Holmner | Sweden | 55 | 15 | - | - | - | - | 14 | 26 | - |
| 32 | Maria Riesch | Germany | 48 | 18 | - | - | 12 | 18 | - | - | - |
| 33 | Silvia Berger | Austria | 43 | 14 | 8 | - | 3 | - | - | 18 | - |
| 34 | Nadia Styger | Switzerland | 40 | - | 40 | - | - | - | - | - | - |
| 35 | Lindsey Kildow | United States | 29 | - | - | - | - | - | 29 | - | - |
| | Brigitte Acton | Canada | 29 | - | - | - | 6 | 10 | - | 13 | - |
| 37 | Michaela Gerg | Germany | 24 | - | - | 20 | - | - | - | 4 | - |
| 38 | Jessica Lindell-Vikarby | Sweden | 20 | - | - | - | - | - | 20 | - | - |
| | Fränzi Aufdenblatten | Switzerland | 20 | 11 | 5 | - | - | - | 4 | - | - |
| 40 | Silke Bachmann | Italy | 19 | - | 6 | - | 13 | - | - | - | - |
| 41 | Emily Brydon | Canada | 17 | - | - | - | - | 11 | - | 6 | - |
| 42 | Sophie Splawinski | Canada | 16 | - | - | 13 | - | - | - | 3 | - |
| 43 | Andrine Flemmen | Norway | 12 | - | - | - | 7 | 5 | - | - | - |
| 44 | Caroline Lalive | United States | 11 | - | - | 11 | - | - | - | - | - |
| 45 | Ana Jelušić | Croatia | 10 | - | - | 10 | - | - | - | - | - |
| | Karina Blieninger | Germany | 10 | - | - | - | 10 | - | - | - | - |
| 47 | Barbara Kleon | Italy | 9 | 9 | - | - | - | - | - | - | - |
| | Kirsten Clark | United States | 9 | - | 3 | 6 | - | - | - | - | - |
| 49 | Resi Stiegler | United States | 8 | 8 | - | - | - | - | - | - | - |
| 50 | Magdalena Planatscher | Italy | 7 | - | - | - | - | 7 | - | - | - |
| | Andrea Fischbacher | Italy | 7 | - | - | - | - | - | - | 7 | - |
| 52 | Ana Drev | Slovenia | 6 | 6 | - | - | - | - | - | - | - |
| 53 | Laurence Lazier | France | 4 | - | - | - | 4 | - | - | - | - |

- Note: In the last race only the best racers were allowed to compete and only the best 15 finishers were awarded with points.
