= 2005 Alpine Skiing World Cup – Women's super-G =

2005 Women's Super G World Cup
Previous: 2004	Next: 2006

Women's Super G World Cup 2004/2005

== Final point standings ==
In Women's Super G World Cup 2004/05 all results count.

Place	Name	Country	Total points	7 (Canada)	8 (Austria)	10 (Switzerland)	18 (Italy)	19 (Italy)	25 (Sweden)	27 (Italy)	31 (Switzerland)
1	Michaela Dorfmeister	Austria	493	100	20	50	45	18	100	60	100
2	Renate Götschl	Austria	416	80	-	29	100	100	26	36	45
3	Lindsey Kildow	United States	396	60	20	80	50	80	36	20	50
4	Anja Pärson	Sweden	359	22	32	20	80	-	45	100	60
5	Hilde Gerg	Germany	296	50	26	100	14	29	32	45	-
6	Alexandra Meissnitzer	Austria	276	6	100	4	26	40	80	-	20
7	Janica Kostelić	Croatia	257	45	40	15	20	26	50	45	16
8	Lucia Recchia	Italy	240	-	80	45	24	-	60	15	16
9	Tina Maze	Slovenia	236	12	60	40	6	24	16	60	18
10	Martina Ertl	Germany	224	40	-	12	60	36	18	18	40
11	Silvia Berger	Austria	198	4	24	10	36	60	3	32	29
12	Elisabeth Görgl	Austria	137	5	-	16	40	14	9	24	29
13	Julia Mancuso	United States	136	29	45	-	15	20	22	5	-
14	Isolde Kostner	Italy	133	15	-	18	4	8	8	80	-
15	Ingrid Jacquemod	France	131	29	9	11	8	45	-	29	-
16	Carole Montillet	France	126	2	36	26	-	50	12	-	-
17	Katja Wirth	Austria	119	36	-	-	18	22	14	29	-
18	Nadia Fanchini	Italy	110	-	12	-	22	-	40	-	36
19	Emily Brydon	Canada	109	-	-	24	29	6	15	13	22
20	Petra Haltmayr	Germany	104	-	10	32	11	9	10	-	32
21	Kelly VanderBeek	Canada	94	18	-	36	-	13	20	7	-
22	Brigitte Obermoser	Austria	91	32	-	-	16	3	29	11	-
	Caroline Lalive	United States	91	-	50	8	5	15	12	1	-
24	Kirsten Clark	United States	82	24	8	-	11	11	4	-	24
25	Marlies Schild	Austria	80	-	-	-	-	-	-	-	80
26	Maria Riesch	Germany	60	-	-	60	-	-	-	-	-
27	Martina Lechner	Austria	57	-	11	6	-	7	24	9	-
28	Sylviane Berthod	Switzerland	56	20	-	7	-	3	2	24	-
29	Andrea Fischbacher	Austria	47	-	-	3	32	-	-	12	-
30	Bryna McCarty	United States	46	10	14	6	-	-	-	16	-
31	Fränzi Aufdenblatten	Switzerland	44	7	5	22	-	10	-	-	-
	Nadia Styger	Switzerland	44	-	22	-	3	4	13	2	-
33	Geneviève Simard	Canada	43	13	-	-	12	12	6	-	-
34	Eveline Rohregger	Austria	38	1	29	-	7	-	1	-	-
35	Karen Putzer	Italy	32	-	-	-	-	32	-	-	-
	Jonna Mendes	United States	32	-	-	3	13	16	-	-	-
37	Libby Ludlow	United States	30	14	16	-	-	-	-	-	-
38	Janette Hargin	Sweden	27	9	-	13	-	5	-	-	-
39	Magda Mattel	France	25	-	15	-	1	-	-	9	-
40	Angelika Grüner	Italy	24	11	13	-	-	-	-	-	-
	Carolina Ruiz Castillo	Switzerland	24	-	-	14	-	-	-	10	-
42	Allison Forsyth	Canada	23	16	-	3	-	-	-	4	-
43	Chemmy Alcott	United Kingdom	16	-	7	-	9	-	-	-	-
44	Barbara Kleon	Italy	15	-	6	9	-	-	-	-	-
45	Elena Fanchini	Italy	14	-	-	-	-	-	-	14	-
46	Mojca Suhadolc	Slovenia	13	9	2	-	2	-	-	-	-
47	Daniela Ceccarelli	Italy	9	-	-	-	-	-	5	4	-
48	Tanja Poutiainen	Finland	8	-	1	-	-	-	7	-	-
49	Urška Rabič	Slovenia	6	-	-	-	-	-	-	6	-
50	Karine Meilleur	France	4	4	-	-	-	-	-	-	-
	Kathrin Wilhelm	Austria	4	-	4	-	-	-	-	-	-
52	Tanja Pieren	Switzerland	3	-	3	-	-	-	-	-	-
53	Wendy Siorpaes	Italy	1	-	-	-	-	1	-	-	-

- Note: In the last race only the best racers were allowed to compete and only the best 15 finishers were awarded with points.
