= FIS Alpine World Ski Championships 2009 – Women's downhill =

Complete results for Women's Downhill competition at the 2009 World Championships. Delayed a day by weather, it was run on February 9, the fifth race of the championships.

Rank	Name	Country	Time	Diff.
1st place, gold medalist(s)	Lindsey Vonn	(United States)	1:30.31	—
2nd place, silver medalist(s)	Lara Gut	(Switzerland)	1:30.83	+0.52
3rd place, bronze medalist(s)	Nadia Fanchini	(Italy)	1:30.88	+0.57
4	Elisabeth Görgl	(Austria)	1:31.24	+0.93
5	Marion Rolland	(France)	1:31.45	+1.14
6	Marie Marchand-Arvier	(France)	1:31.51	+1.20
7	Andrea Fischbacher	(Austria)	1:31.88	+1.57
8	Wendy Siorpaes	(Italy)	1:32.31	+2.00
9	Stacey Cook	(United States)	1:32.37	+2.06
10	Maria Riesch	(Germany)	1:32.42	+2.11
11	Emily Brydon	(Canada)	1:32.44	+2.13
12	Aurelie Revillet	(France)	1:32.63	+2.32
12	Anja Pärson	(Sweden)	1:32.63	+2.32
14	Tina Maze	(Slovenia)	1:32.64	+2.33
15	Chemmy Alcott	(United Kingdom)	1:33.04	+2.73
16	Daniela Merighetti	(Italy)	1:33.25	+2.94
17	Fabienne Suter	(Switzerland)	1:33.35	+3.04
18	Edith Miklos	(Romania)	1:33.41	+3.10
19	Carolina Ruiz Castillo	(Spain)	1:33.42	+3.11
20	Ingrid Jacquemod	(France)	1:33.44	+3.13
21	Kelly Vanderbeek	(Canada)	1:33.59	+3.28
22	Maruša Ferk	(Slovenia)	1:33.61	+3.30
23	Verena Stuffer	(Italy)	1:34.26	+3.95
24	Renate Götschl	(Austria)	1:34.32	+4.01
25	Mateja Robnik	(Slovenia)	1:34.56	+4.25
26	Gina Stechert	(Germany)	1:34.65	+4.34
27	Chelsea Marshall	(United States)	1:35.40	+5.09
28	Leyre Morlans	(Spain)	1:36.12	+5.81
29	Klara Křižova	(Czech Republic)	1:36.31	+6.00
30	Macarena Simari Birkner	(Argentina)	1:37.31	+7.00
31	María Belén Simari Birkner	(Argentina)	1:38.91	+8.60
32	Isabel van Buynder	(Belgium)	1:42.27	+11.96
	Nadia Styger	(Switzerland)	DNF	
	Dominique Gisin	(Switzerland)	DNF	
	Britt Janyk	(Canada)	DNF	
	Anna Fenninger	(Austria)	DNF	
	Alexandra Coletti	(Monaco)	DNF	
