= FIS Alpine World Ski Championships 2009 – Women's super combined =

Complete results for Women's Super Combined competition at the 2009 World Championships. It was run on February 6, the third race of the championships.

Rank	Name	Country	Time	Diff.	Downhill	Slalom
Gold	Kathrin Zettel	(Austria)	2:20.13	--	1:31.97	48.16
Silver	Lara Gut	(Switzerland)	2:20.69	+0.56	1:30.63	50.06
Bronze	Elisabeth Görgl	(Austria)	2:21.01	+0.88	1:31.03	49.98
4	Maria Riesch	(Germany)	2:21.67	+1.54	1:31.92	49.75
5	Marie Marchand-Arvier	(France)	2:22.62	+2.49	1:32.15	50.47
6	Johanna Schnarf	(Italy)	2:22.68	+2.55	1:34.01	48.67
7	Anna Fenninger	(Austria)	2:22.69	+2.56	1:33.22	49.47
8	Fabienne Suter	(Switzerland)	2:22.90	+2.77	1:32.45	50.45
9	Sandrine Aubert	(France)	2:22.98	+2.85	1:35.90	47.08
10	Maruša Ferk	(Slovenia)	2:23.11	+2.98	1:32.41	50,70
11	Šárka Záhrobská	(Czech Republic)	2:23.19	+3.06	1:35.11	48.08
12	Gina Stechert	(Germany)	2:23.63	+3.50	1:33.79	49.84
13	Mateja Robnik	(Slovenia)	2:23.79	+3.66	1:32.77	51.02
14	Rabea Grand	(Switzerland)	2:24.13	+4.00	1:35.05	49.08
15	Ingrid Jacquemod	(France)	2:24.24	+4.11	1:33.80	50.44
16	Stacey Cook	(United States)	2:25.25	+5.12	1:32.37	52.88
17	Chemmy Alcott	(United Kingdom)	2:25.47	+5.34	1:33.19	52.28
18	Marion Rolland	(France)	2:25.52	+5.39	1:33.09	52.43
19	Mireia Gutiérrez	(Andorra)	2:27.47	+7.34	1:36.37	51.10
20	Lucie Hrstková	(Czech Republic)	2:29.80	+9.67	1:38.41	51.30
21	María Belén Simari Birkner	(Argentina)	2:30.15	+10.02	1:38.97	51.18
22	Maria Kirkova	(Bulgaria)	2:32.15	+12.02	1:41.81	50.34
23	Macarena Simari Birkner	(Argentina)	2:34.51	+14.38	1:37.11	57.40
24	Isabel van Buynder	(Belgium)	2:35.05	+14.92	1:43.56	51.49
25	Klára Křížová	(Czech Republic)	2:43.78	+23.65	1:37.58	1:06.20
–	Michaela Kirchgasser	(Austria)	DQ	–	DQ	--
–	Lindsey Vonn	(United States)	DQ	–	1:30.49	DQ
–	Andrea Dettling	(Switzerland)	DNF	–	DNF	--
–	Tina Maze	(Slovenia)	DNF	–	1:33.61	DNF
–	Daniela Merighetti	(Italy)	DNF	–	1:32.63	DNF
–	Julia Mancuso	(United States)	DNF	–	DNF	--
–	Emily Brydon	(Canada)	DNF	–	DNF	--
–	Anja Pärson	(Sweden)	DNF	–	DNF	--
–	Frida Hansdotter	(Sweden)	DNF	–	DNF	--
–	Chelsea Marshall	(United States)	DNF	–	1:35.74	DNS
–	Carolina Ruiz Castillo	(Spain)	DNF	–	1:35.12	DNS
–	Edith Miklós	(Romania)	DNF	–	DNF	--
–	Alexandra Coletti	(Monaco)	DNF	–	DNF	--
–	Leyre Morlans	(Spain)	DNF	–	DNF	--
