= Ana Drev =

Slovenian alpine skier

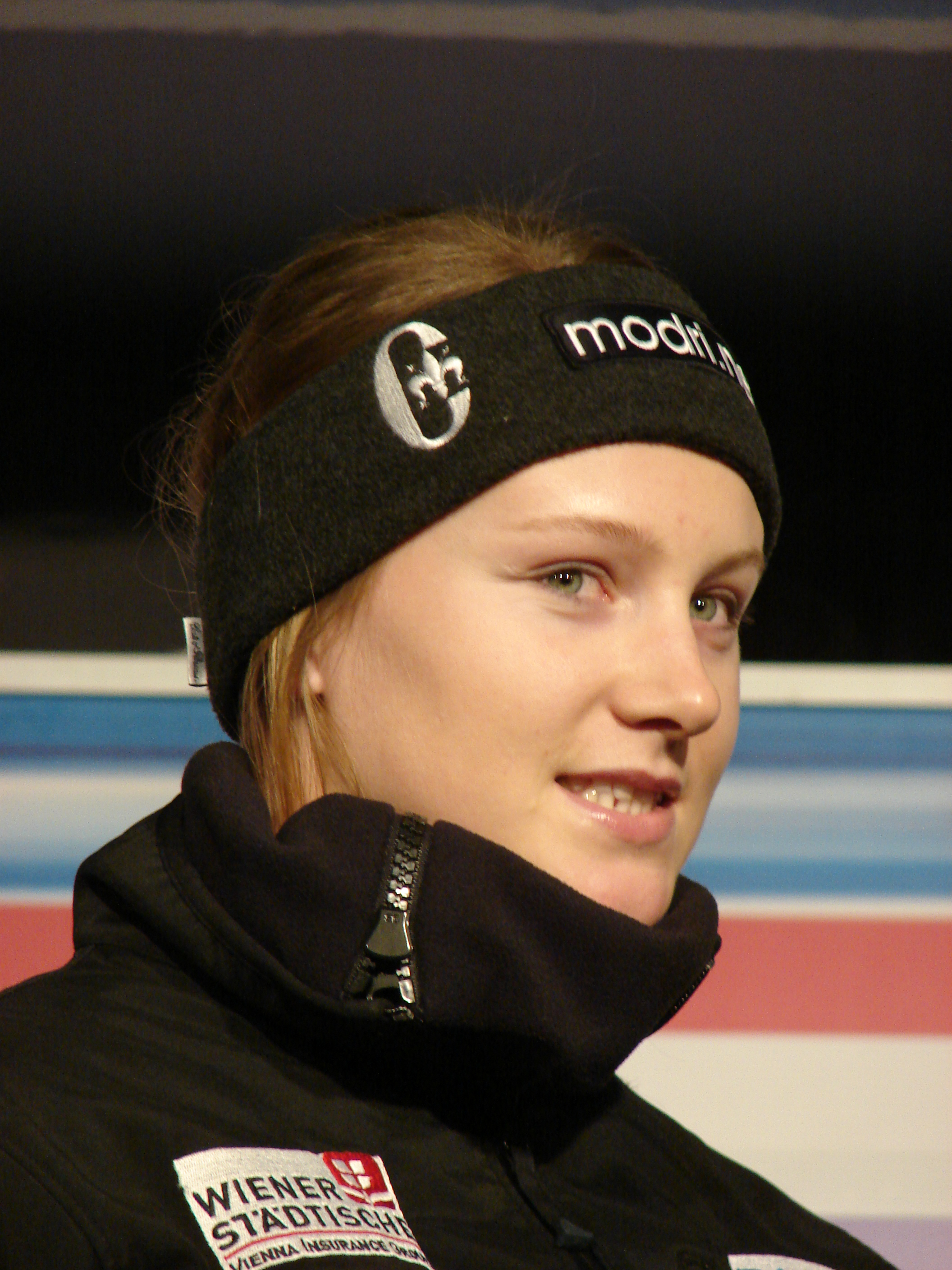
- Drev in December 2006

Personal information
- Born: 6 August 1985 (age 40) Slovenj Gradec, SFR Yugoslavia
- Height: 1.71 m (5 ft 7 in)

Skiing career
- Sport: Alpine skiing ♀
- Club: DVO-SK Dvornik transport
- Disciplines: Giant slalom
- World Cup debut: 27 October 2001 (age 16)

Olympics
- Teams: 2 – (2006, 2010)
- Medals: 0

World Championships
- Teams: 7 – (2003–2009, 2013–2017)
- Medals: 0

World Cup
- Seasons: 18 – (2002–2019)
- Wins: 0
- Podiums: 2 – (2 GS)
- Overall titles: 0 – (35th in 2016)
- Discipline titles: 0 – (7th in GS, 2016)

Ana Drev (born 6 August 1985) is a Slovenian World Cup alpine ski racer. She specializes in the giant slalom and started her first European Cup race at age 15 on February 24, 2001, in Rogla, Slovenia.

Drev made her World Cup debut in October 2001 at age 16. She debuted at the Winter Olympic Games in 2006, at age 20, finishing 9th in giant slalom.

In season 2016 she finished as seventh in giant slalom ranking, achieving two podiums in World Cup, the first of her career. Ranked among the greatest Slovenian giant slalom skiers, Drev's career was plagued by health problems and instability in her national team, which didn't allow her to live up to her potentiality. She retired in February 2020, after suffering an injury in December 2018.

== Career ==
=== 2016 season ===
Drev started the 2015–16 FIS Alpine Ski World Cup well, leading in the giant slalom, before Lara Gut and Eva-Maria Brem, by the end of December, after performing "sensationally" in Lienz. This was followed by a second place in Flachau on 17 January 2016 and another second place in Maribor two weeks later, on 30 January 2016. However, the championship was eventually won by Eva-Maria Brem, with Drev finishing 7th in the discipline

=== 2017 Season ===
Drev finished the 2016–17 FIS Alpine Ski World Cup season 8th in giant slalom. That year she also participated in the FIS Alpine World Ski Championships 2017, finishing 7th.

=== 2018 season ===
Drev finished 9th in giant slalom in the 2017–18 FIS Alpine Ski World Cup.

Ana Drev is frequently ranked as one of the greatest Slovenian giant slalom skiers.

Drev last competed on December 28, 2018, in the World Cup. In her last race she suffered an injury and during her rehabilitation contemplated retiring. Finally, in February 2020, after 18 years in the World Cup, she announced her retirement.

It has been stated that Drev, a talented skier, would've achieved much more than two podiums in the World Cup if she hadn't been impeded by a series of injuries and health problems and problems within the Slovenian national team. Drev expressed regret at not having lived up to her potentiality, stating that she was especially disappointed with her results at the 2018 Winter Olympics in Pyongyang, where she felt she could get a medal.

== World Cup results ==
=== Season standings ===
Season	Age	Overall	Slalom	Giant slalom	Super-G	Downhill	Combined
2005	19	110	—	52	—	—	—
2006	20	59	—	22	—	—	42
2007	21	95	—	30	—	—	—
2008	22	59	45	19	47	—	—
2009	23	113	—	47	—	—	—
2010	24	—	—	—	—	—	—
2011	25	115	—	41	—	—	—
2012	26	85	—	35	—	—	—
2013	27	63	—	23	—	—	—
2014	28	—	—	—	—	—	—
2015	29	64	—	23	—	—	—
2016	30	35	—	7	—	—	—
2017	31	36	—	8	—	—	—
2018	32	38	—	9	—	—	—
2019	33	106◇	—	41	—	—	—

◇ injured during the season

=== Race podiums ===
- 2 podiums – (2 GS)

Season	Date	Location	Discipline	Place
2016	17 Jan 2016	Flachau, Austria	Giant slalom	2nd
2016	30 Jan 2016	Maribor, Slovenia	Giant slalom	2nd

== World Championship results ==
Year	Age	Slalom	Giant slalom	Super-G	Downhill	Combined
2003	17	DNF1	DNF2	—	—	—
2005	19	—	24	—	—	—
2007	21	—	DNF2	—	—	—
2009	23	—	14	—	—	—
2013	27	—	10	—	—	—
2015	29	—	24	—	—	—
2017	31	—	7	—	—	—

== Olympic results ==
Year	Age	Slalom	Giant slalom	Super-G	Downhill	Combined
2006	20	—	9	45	—	—
2010	24	DNF1	19	—	—	—
