= FIS Alpine World Ski Championships 2007 – Women's super-G =

Women's super-G at the FIS Alpine World Ski Championships 2007
- Venue: WM Strecke; Åre, Jämtland, Sweden
- Date: February 6, 2007
- Competitors: 43 from 17 nations
- Winning time: 1:18.85

Medalists
gold medal	Anja Pärson	Sweden
silver medal	Lindsey Kildow	United States
bronze medal	Renate Götschl	Austria

The women's super-G competition at the 2007 World Championships was held on Tuesday, February 6.

The race was scheduled to start at 11:00 CET.

The start was lowered 74 meters (243 ft) to 3,246 m (10,650 ft), shortening the course by 200 m (220 yd). The reduced course had a vertical drop of 516 m (1,693 ft) and a length of 1.640 km (1.02 mi).

== Results ==
Rank	Bib	Name	Country	Time	Diff.
1st place, gold medalist(s)	24	Anja Pärson	Sweden	1:18.85	—
2nd place, silver medalist(s)	30	Lindsey Kildow	United States	1:19.17	+0.32
3rd place, bronze medalist(s)	31	Renate Götschl	Austria	1:19.38	+0.53
4	29	Nicole Hosp	Austria	1:19.44	+0.59
4	18	Britt Janyk	Canada	1:19.44	+0.59
6	27	Julia Mancuso	United States	1:19.63	+0.78
7	26	Nadia Styger	Switzerland	1:19.65	+0.80
8	28	Alexandra Meissnitzer	Austria	1:19.97	+1.12
9	10	Libby Ludlow	United States	1:20.08	+1.23
10	11	Maria Riesch	Germany	1:20.18	+1.33
11	3	Fabienne Suter	Switzerland	1:20.19	+1.34
12	22	Martina Schild	Switzerland	1:20.63	+1.78
13	17	Emily Brydon	Canada	1:20.65	+1.80
14	21	Tina Maze	Slovenia	1:20.73	+1.88
15	12	Petra Haltmayr	Germany	1:20.74	+1.89
16	13	Christine Sponring	Austria	1:20.75	+1.90
17	1	Johanna Schnarf	Italy	1:21.08	+2.23
18	5	Marie Marchand-Arvier	France	1:21.16	+2.31
19	20	Fraenzi Aufdenblatten	Switzerland	1:21.20	+2.35
20	15	Genevieve Simard	Canada	1:21.24	+2.39
20	14	Kirsten Clark	United States	1:21.24	+2.39
22	8	Gina Stechert	Germany	1:21.25	+2.40
23	2	Alexandra Coletti	Monaco	1:21.56	+2.71
24	33	Urska Rabic	Slovenia	1:21.58	+2.73
25	6	Carolina Ruiz Castillo	Spain	1:21.86	+3.01
26	38	Dagny Kristjansdottir	Iceland	1:22.01	+3.16
27	34	Petra Robnik	Slovenia	1:22.19	+3.34
28	9	Chemmy Alcott	Great Britain	1:22.22	+3.37
29	37	Lucie Hrstková	Czech Republic	1:22.43	+3.58
30	42	Frida Hansdotter	Sweden	1:22.49	+3.64
31	36	Elena Fanchini	Italy	1:24.64	+5.79
32	41	Eva Hucková	Slovakia	1:26.85	+8.00
33	40	Sona Maculová	Slovakia	1:28.36	+9.51
34	7	Jessica Lindell-Vikarby	Sweden	1:31.09	+12.24
	4	Nike Bent	Sweden	DNF	
	16	Ingrid Jacquemod	France	DNF	
	19	Nadia Fanchini	Italy	DNF	
	23	Lucia Recchia	Italy	DNF	
	23	Kelly Vanderbeek	Canada	DNF	
	32	Tina Weirather	Liechtenstein	DNF	
	35	Anne-Sophie Barthet	France	DNF	
	39	Kajsa Kling	Sweden	DNF	
	43	Anna Breigutu	Brazil	DNF	
