= 2005 Alpine Skiing World Cup – Women's combined =

2005 Women's combined World Cup
Previous: 2004	Next: 2006

Women's combined World Cup 2004/2005

== Final point standings ==
In the women's combined World Cup 2004/05, only one competition was held.

Place	Name	Country	Total points	29 (Italy)
1	Janica Kostelić	Croatia	100	100
2	Anja Pärson	Sweden	80	80
3	Emily Brydon	Canada	60	60
4	Nicole Hosp	Austria	50	50
5	Lindsey Kildow	United States	45	45
6	Julia Mancuso	United States	40	40
7	Renate Götschl	Austria	36	36
8	Resi Stiegler	United States	32	32
9	Marlies Schild	Austria	29	29
10	Brigitte Acton	Canada	26	26
11	Elisabeth Görgl	Austria	24	24
12	Monika Bergmann-Schmuderer	Germany	22	22
13	Janette Hargin	Sweden	20	20
14	Caroline Lalive	United States	18	18
15	Michaela Dorfmeister	Austria	16	16
16	Kaylin Richardson	United States	15	15
17	Šárka Záhrobská	Czech Republic	14	14
18	Marlies Oester	Switzerland	13	13
19	Britt Janyk	Canada	12	12
20	Macarena Simari Birkner	Argentina	11	11
21	Brigitte Obermoser	Austria	10	10
22	Jelena Lolović	Serbia and Montenegro	9	9
23	Hilde Gerg	Germany	8	8
24	Daniela Ceccarelli	Italy	7	7
25	Isolde Kostner	Italy	6	6
26	Sherry Lawrence	Canada	5	5
27	Verena Stuffer	Italy	4	4
28	María Belén Simari Birkner	Argentina	3	3

Note:

Not all points were awarded (not enough finishers).

== Women's combined team results ==
Bold indicates highest score - italics indicate race win

Place	Country	Total points	20 (Switzerland)	Racers	Wins
1	Austria	165	**165**	6	0
2	United States	150	150	5	0
3	Canada	103	103	4	0
4	Croatia	100	100	1	1
	Sweden	100	100	2	0
6	Germany	30	30	2	0
7	Italy	17	17	3	0
8	Czech Republic	14	14	1	0
	Argentina	14	14	2	0
10	Switzerland	13	13	1	0
11	Serbia and Montenegro	9	9	1	0
