= FIS Alpine World Ski Championships 2007 – Women's downhill =

Below are the results of the FIS Alpine World Ski Championships 2007 downhill women's race which took place on 11 February 2007.

== Results ==
Rank	Athlete	Nation	Time	Behind
1	Anja Pärson	Sweden	1:26.89	—
2	Lindsey Kildow	United States	1:27.29	+0.40
3	Nicole Hosp	Austria	1:27.37	+0.48
4	Nadia Styger	Switzerland	1:27.82	+0.93
5	Dominique Gisin	Switzerland	1:27.88	+0.99
6	Nike Bent	Sweden	1:27.93	+1.04
7	Renate Götschl	Austria	1:27.94	+1.05
8	Ingrid Jacquemod	France	1:27.95	+1.06
9	Maria Riesch	Germany	1:27.98	+1.09
10	Julia Mancuso	United States	1:28.09	+1.20
11	Marie Marchand-Arvier	France	1:28.12	+1.23
12	Britt Janyk	Canada	1:28.20	+1.31
13	Nadia Fanchini	Italy	1:28.36	+1.47
14	Fränzi Aufdenblatten	Switzerland	1:28.39	+1.50
15	Kirsten L. Clark	United States	1:28.40	+1.51
16	Stacey J. Cook	United States	1:28.55	+1.66
17	Daniela Merighetti	Italy	1:28.68	+1.79
18	Elisabeth Görgl	Austria	1:28.74	+1.85
18	Shona Rubens	Canada	1:28.74	+1.85
20	Carolina Ruiz Castillo	Spain	1:28.94	+2.05
21	Maria Holaus	Austria	1:28.95	+2.06
22	Sylviane Berthod	Switzerland	1:29.01	+2.12
23	Urška Rabič	Slovenia	1:29.02	+2.13
24	Emily Brydon	Canada	1:29.10	+2.21
25	Alexandra Coletti	Monaco	1:29.34	+2.45
26	Dagný L. Kristjánsdóttir	Iceland	1:29.57	+2.68
27	Elena Fanchini	Italy	1:30.15	+3.26
28	Petra Haltmayr	Germany	1:30.26	+3.37
29	Lucia Recchia	Italy	1:30.43	+3.54
30	Petra Robnik	Slovenia	1:30.51	+3.62
—	Gina Stechert	Germany	DNF	—
—	Jessica Lindell-Vikarby	Sweden	DNF	—
—	Chemmy Alcott	United Kingdom	DNF	—
—	Kelly VanderBeek	Canada	DNF	—
—	Kajsa Kling	Sweden	DNF	—
