= Robnik =

Robnik is a Slovene surname. Notable people with the surname include:

- Mateja Robnik (born 1987), Slovene alpine skier
- Petra Robnik (born 1984), Slovene alpine skier
- Tina Robnik (born 1991), Slovene alpine ski racer
