= Birkelund =

Birkelund is a surname. Notable people with the surname include:

- Eirik Birkelund (born 1994), Norwegian footballer
- Jan Birkelund (1950–1983), Norwegian footballer
- Karina Birkelund (born 1980), Norwegian alpine skier
- Olivia Birkelund (born 1963), American actress
- Therese Birkelund Ulvo (born 1982), Norwegian composer and producer
- Tove Birkelund (1928–1986), Danish historical geologist
