= Andrea Fischbacher =

Austrian alpine skier

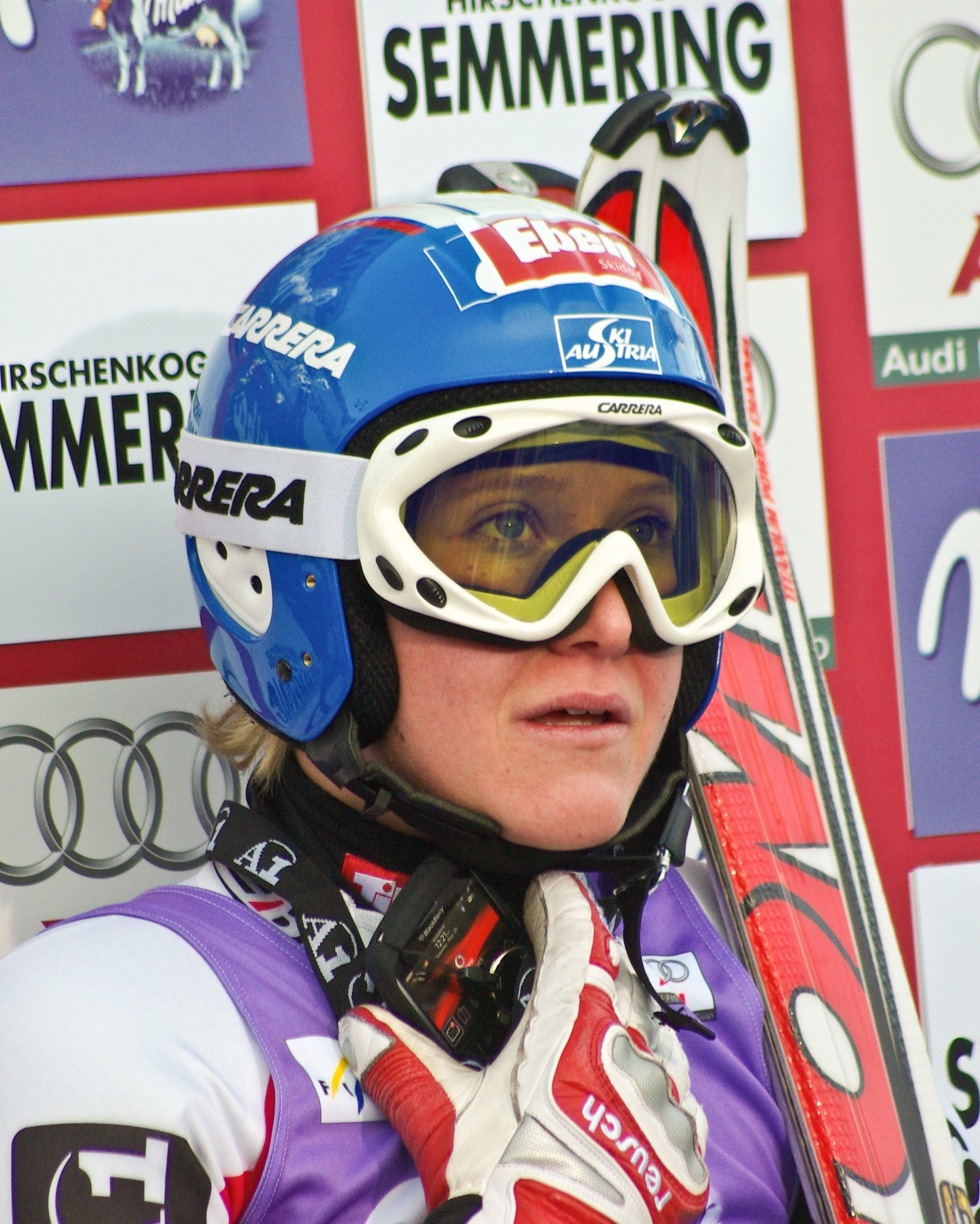
- Fischbacher in December 2008

Personal information
- Born: 14 October 1985 (age 40) Schwarzach im Pongau, Salzburg, Austria
- Height: 164 cm (5 ft 5 in)
- Website: andrea-fischbacher.at

Skiing career
- Sport: Alpine skiing
- Club: Union Skiklub Eben i.P.
- Retired: 10 June 2015 (age 29)
- Disciplines: Super-G, downhill, giant slalom, combined
- World Cup debut: 11 March 2004 (age 18)

Olympics
- Teams: 2 – (2006, 2010)
- Medals: 1 (1 gold)

World Championships
- Teams: 4 – (2005, 2009–13)
- Medals: 1 (0 gold)

World Cup
- Seasons: 11 – (2005–15)
- Wins: 3 – (2 DH, 1 SG)
- Podiums: 10 – (2 DH, 6 SG, 1 GS)
- Overall titles: 0 – (10th in 2009, 2010 )
- Discipline titles: 0 – (2nd in DH, 2009)
Medal record
Women's alpine skiing
Representing Austria
Olympic Games
Gold medal – first place	2010 Vancouver	Super-G
World Championships
Bronze medal – third place	2009 Val-d'Isère	Super-G
Junior World Ski Championships
Gold medal – first place	2003 Bardonecchia	Super-G
Gold medal – first place	2004 Maribor	Super-G

Andrea Fischbacher (born 14 October 1985) is a retired alpine ski racer from Austria.

== Career ==
Born in Schwarzach im Pongau, Salzburg, Fischbacher now lives in Eben im Pongau. She made her World Cup debut in March 2004 in Sestriere, Italy, where she would claim her first World Cup victory four years later in a dead-heat tie with Fabienne Suter. Fischbacher competed for Austria at the Winter Olympics in 2006 and again in 2010, where she won the gold medal in the Super-G, ahead of Tina Maze and Lindsey Vonn. In the Downhill on February 17, she finished 4th, missing the bronze medal by 0.03 seconds.

Left off the Austrian team for the 2014 Winter Olympics, Fischbacher responded with a victory in the first race after the games, her first World Cup podium in over four years.

== World Cup results ==
=== Race podiums ===
- 3 wins – (2 DH, 1 SG)
- 10 podiums – (3 DH, 6 SG, 1 GS)

Season	Date	Location	Discipline	Place
2006	4 Dec 2005	Lake Louise, Canada	Super-G	2nd
2006	9 Dec 2005	Aspen, USA	Super-G	3rd
2007	15 Mar 2007	Lenzerheide, Switzerland	Super-G	2nd
2008	10 Feb 2008	Sestriere, Italy	Super-G	1st^
2009	25 Oct 2008	Sölden, Austria	Giant slalom	3rd
2009	7 Dec 2008	Lake Louise, Canada	Super-G	2nd
2009	27 Feb 2009	Bansko, Bulgaria	Downhill	2nd
2009	28 Feb 2009	Bansko, Bulgaria	Downhill	1st
2010	31 Jan 2010	St. Moritz, Switzerland	Super-G	2nd
2014	2 Mar 2014	Crans-Montana, Switzerland	Downhill	1st

^ Tie for first with Fabienne Suter.

=== Season standings ===
Season	Age	Overall	Slalom	Giant slalom	Super-G	Downhill	Combined
2005	19	68	—	50	29	47	—
2006	20	15	34	14	7	36	19
2007	21	13	39	18	8	11	35
2008	22	20	52	27	12	25	21
2009	23	10	—	14	8	2	20
2010	24	10	—	17	5	15	20
2011	25	14	—	13	13	11	15
2012	26	31	—	34	15	17	—
2013	27	60	—	—	21	33	—
2014	28	21	—	33	38	8	—
2015	29	63	—	31	40	31	—

== World Championship results ==
Year	Age	Slalom	Giant slalom	Super-G	Downhill	Combined
2005	19	—	—	7	—	—
2007	21	—	—	—	—	—
2009	23	—	24	3	7	—
2011	25	—	25	DNF	9	—
2013	27	—	—	9	8	—
2015	29	—	—	—	—	—

== Olympic results ==
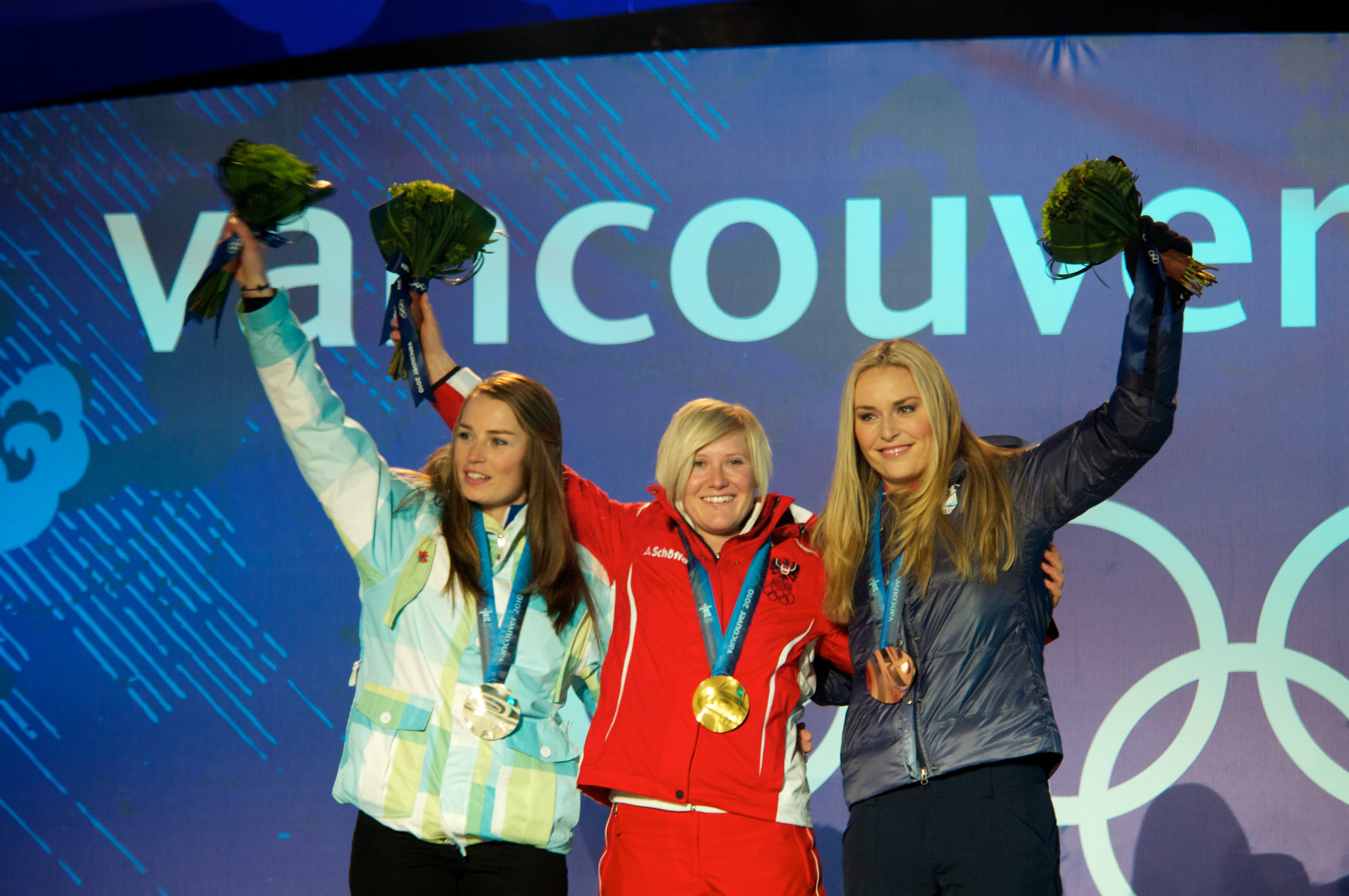
Fischbacher (center) with super-G medalists Tina Maze and Lindsey Vonn at the 2010 Winter Olympics

Year	Age	Slalom	Giant slalom	Super-G	Downhill	Combined
2006	20	—	—	13	—	—
2010	24	—	—	1	4	—
2014	28	—	—	—	—	—

== Personal ==
Fischbacher is a second cousin of Hermann Maier, a multiple Olympic, World Cup, and world champion.

Awards
Preceded by Mirna Jukić	Austrian Sportswoman of the year 2010	Succeeded by Elisabeth Görgl
