= Magdalena Planatscher =

Italian alpine skier (born 1979)

Magdalena Planatscher (born 6 September 1979) is a retired Italian alpine skier.

She competed at the 1999 Junior World Championships without finishing any race, and also in the giant slalom at the 2001 World Alpine Ski Championships without finishing.

She made her FIS Alpine Ski World Cup debut in October 1999 in Tignes, also collecting her first World Cup points with a 26th place in the giant slalom. She quickly improved to a 21st place in Copper Mountain and a 7th place in Serre Chevalier, both in giant slalom. She continued finishing regularly among the top 30, but did not break the top 10 again. Her last World Cup outing came in January 2005 in Santa Caterina di Valfurva, finishing 24th, once again in the giant slalom.
