= 2008–09 FIS Alpine Ski World Cup =

International sports competition

FIS Alpine Ski World Cup 2008/09
Discipline	Men	Women
Overall	(Norway) Aksel Lund Svindal	(United States) Lindsey Vonn
Downhill	(Austria) Michael Walchhofer	(United States) Lindsey Vonn
Super-G	(Norway) Aksel Lund Svindal	(United States) Lindsey Vonn
Giant slalom	(Switzerland) Didier Cuche	(Finland) Tanja Poutiainen
Slalom	(France) Jean-Baptiste Grange	(Germany) Maria Riesch
Super combined	(Switzerland) Carlo Janka	(Sweden) Anja Pärson
Nations Cup	Austria	Austria
- Nations Cup Overall: Austria

Competition
Locations	18	16
Individual	36	34
Mixed	1	1
Cancelled	1	1
Rescheduled	3	3

The 43rd World Cup season began in late October 2008 in Sölden, Austria, and concluded in mid-March 2009, at the World Cup finals in Åre, Sweden.

Aksel Lund Svindal of Norway won the overall title by two points over Benjamin Raich of Austria. Svindal returned from a season-ending injury in December 2007, and also took the season title in super-G. Lindsey Vonn of the U.S. repeated as women's overall champion, taking the title by a substantial 384 points over Maria Riesch of Germany. Vonn also repeated as the season downhill champion, and added the season title in super-G.

Being an odd-numbered year, a break in the World Cup schedule was for the biennial World Championships. The 2009 World Championships were held 2–15 February in Val-d'Isère, Savoie, France.

No pre-Olympic World Cup alpine events were run at Whistler Mountain, Canada, during the 2009 season. In late February 2008, a women's downhill and super-combined were run on Franz's Run, the women's Olympic course. The most recent men's World Cup events on the Dave Murray Downhill course were held in late February 1995. The World Cup races in North America were switched to the early part of the season in the fall of 1995, and the men's speed events at Whistler were canceled three consecutive years (December 1996–98) due to weather issues, which prompted the switch to Lake Louise in Alberta in December 1999.

== Calendar ==
2009 World Cup Champions

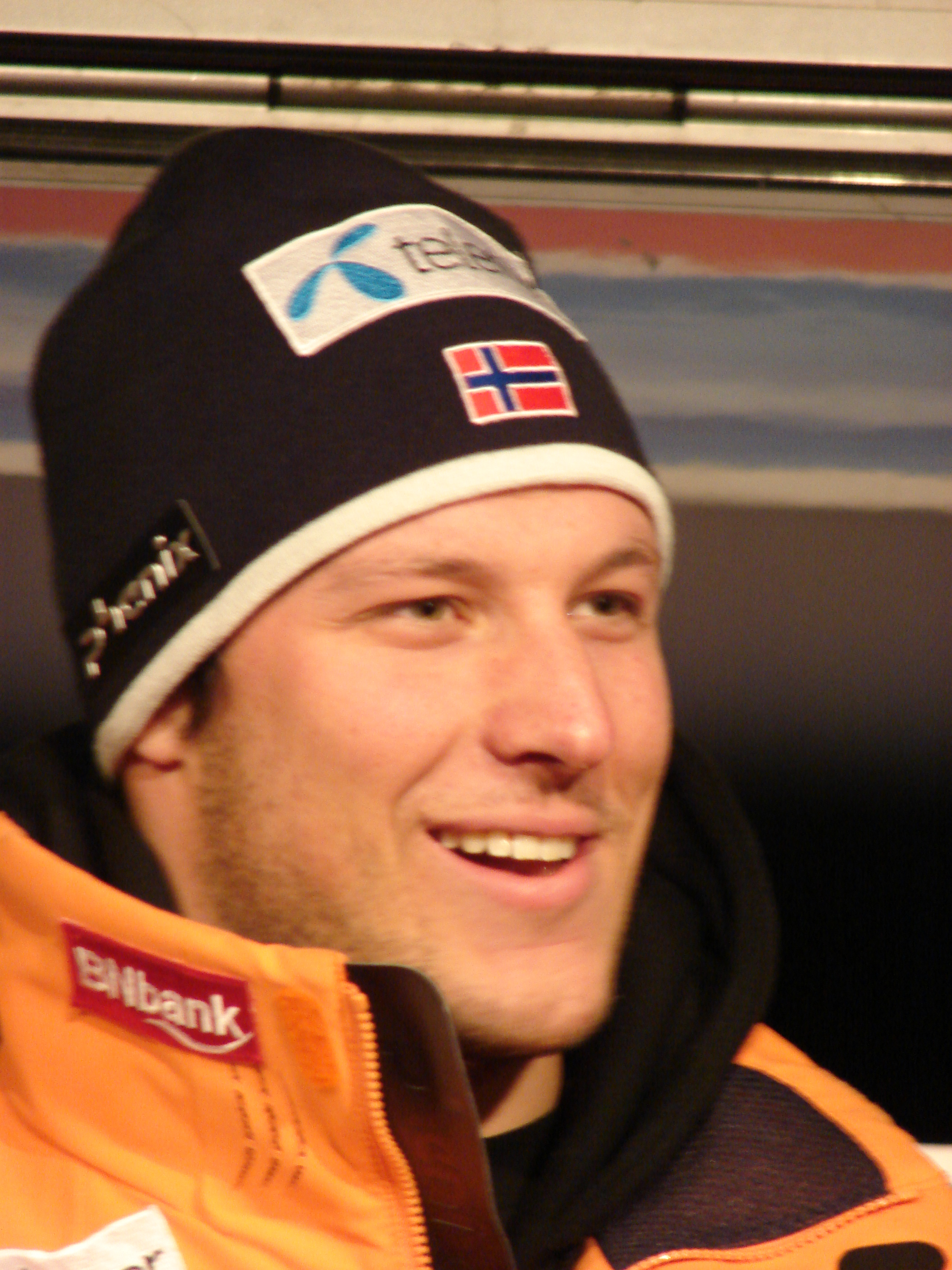
Aksel Lund Svindal

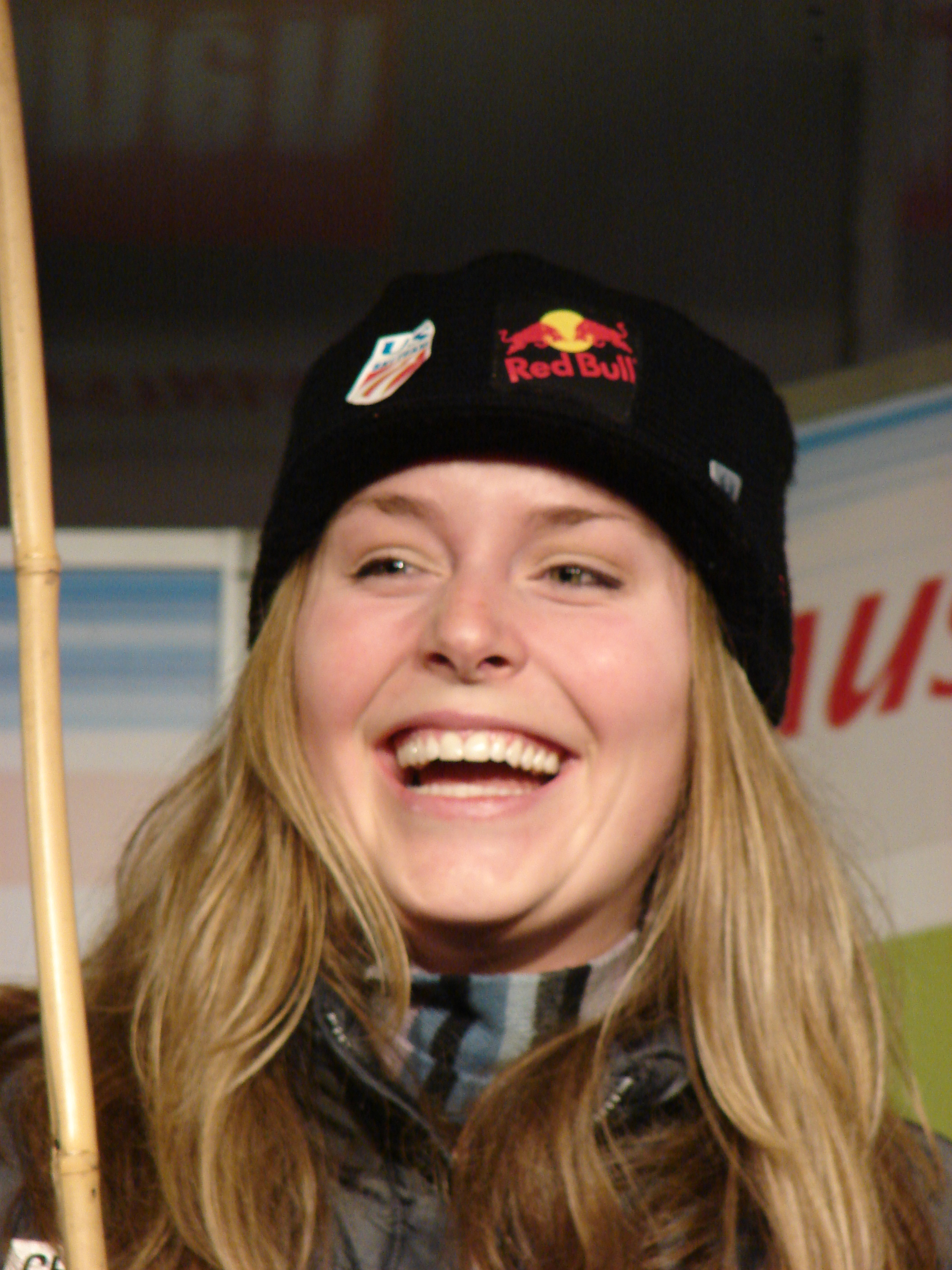
Lindsey Vonn

=== Men ===
Event key: DH – Downhill, SL – Slalom, GS – Giant slalom, SG – Super giant slalom, KB – Classic Combined, SC – Super combined, PS – Parallel slalom (promo event only)
All	No.	Date	Place	Type	Winner	Second	Third	Details
1338	1	26 October 2008	(Austria) Sölden	GS _{326}	(Switzerland) Daniel Albrecht	(Switzerland) Didier Cuche	(United States) Ted Ligety	
1339	2	16 November 2008	(Finland) Levi	SL _{382}	(France) Jean-Baptiste Grange	(United States) Bode Miller	(Austria) Mario Matt	
1340	3	29 November 2008	(Canada) Lake Louise	DH _{388}	(Italy) Peter Fill	(Switzerland) Carlo Janka	(Sweden) Hans Olsson	
1341	4	30 November 2008	(Canada) Lake Louise	SG _{142}	(Austria) Hermann Maier	(Canada) John Kucera	(Switzerland) Didier Cuche	
		4 December 2008	(United States) Beaver Creek	SC _{cnx}	heavy snowfall; replaced in Val-d'Isère on 12 December 2008			
1342	5	5 December 2008	(United States) Beaver Creek	DH _{389}	(Norway) Aksel Lund Svindal	(Liechtenstein) Marco Büchel	(Canada) Erik Guay	
1343	6	6 December 2008	(United States) Beaver Creek	SG _{143}	(Norway) Aksel Lund Svindal	(Austria) Hermann Maier	(Austria) Michael Walchhofer	
1344	7	7 December 2008	(United States) Beaver Creek	GS _{327}	(Austria) Benjamin Raich	(United States) Ted Ligety	(Norway) Aksel Lund Svindal	
1345	8	(Note: Super combined from Beaver Creek was rescheduled to Val-d'Isère on 12 December 2008)12 December 2008	(France) Val-d'Isère	SC _{101}	(Austria) Benjamin Raich	(France) Jean-Baptiste Grange	(Austria) Marcel Hirscher	
1346	9	13 December 2008	(France) Val-d'Isère	GS _{328}	(Switzerland) Carlo Janka	(Italy) Massimiliano Blardone	(France) Gauthier de Tessières	
		14 December 2008	(France) Val-d'Isère	SL _{cnx}	high winds; replaced in Alta Badia on 22 December 2008			
1347	10	19 December 2008	(Italy) Val Gardena	SG _{144}	(Italy) Werner Heel	(Switzerland) Didier Défago	(Sweden) Patrik Järbyn	
1348	11	20 December 2008	(Italy) Val Gardena	DH _{390}	(Austria) Michael Walchhofer	(United States) Bode Miller	(Canada) Manuel Osborne-Paradis	
1349	12	21 December 2008	(Italy) Alta Badia	GS _{329}	(Switzerland) Daniel Albrecht	(Croatia) Ivica Kostelić	(Austria) Hannes Reichelt	
1350	13	(Note: Slalom from Val-d'Isère was rescheduled to Alta Badia on 22 December 2008)22 December 2008	(Italy) Alta Badia	SL _{383}	(Croatia) Ivica Kostelić	(France) Jean-Baptiste Grange	(Austria) Benjamin Raich	
1351	14	28 December 2008	(Italy) Bormio	DH _{391}	(Italy) Christof Innerhofer	(Austria) Klaus Kröll	(Austria) Michael Walchhofer	
Promo event		2 January 2009	(Russia) Moscow (unofficial)	PS _{pro}	(Germany) Felix Neureuther	(France) Jean-Baptiste Grange	(United States) Bode Miller	
1352	15	6 January 2009	(Croatia) Zagreb	SL _{384}	(France) Jean-Baptiste Grange	(Croatia) Ivica Kostelić	(Italy) Giuliano Razzoli	
1353	16	10 January 2009	(Switzerland) Adelboden	GS _{330}	(Austria) Benjamin Raich	(Italy) Massimiliano Blardone	(Norway) Kjetil Jansrud	
1354	17	11 January 2009	(Switzerland) Adelboden	SL _{385}	(Austria) Reinfried Herbst	(Austria) Manfred Pranger	(Germany) Felix Neureuther	
1355	18	16 January 2009	(Switzerland) Wengen	SC _{102}	(Switzerland) Carlo Janka	(Italy) Peter Fill	(Switzerland) Silvan Zurbriggen	
1356	19	17 January 2009	(Switzerland) Wengen	DH _{392}	(Switzerland) Didier Défago	(United States) Bode Miller	(United States) Marco Sullivan	
1357	20	18 January 2009	(Switzerland) Wengen	SL _{386}	(Austria) Manfred Pranger	(Austria) Reinfried Herbst	(Croatia) Ivica Kostelić	
1358	21	23 January 2009	(Austria) Kitzbühel	SG _{145}	(Austria) Klaus Kröll	(Norway) Aksel Lund Svindal	(Switzerland) Ambrosi Hoffmann	
1359	22	24 January 2009	(Austria) Kitzbühel	DH _{393}	(Switzerland) Didier Défago	(Austria) Michael Walchhofer	(Austria) Klaus Kröll	
1360	23	25 January 2009	(Austria) Kitzbühel	SL _{387}	(France) Julien Lizeroux	(France) Jean-Baptiste Grange	(Italy) Patrick Thaler	
1361	24	25 January 2009	(Austria) Kitzbühel	KB _{103}	(Switzerland) Silvan Zurbriggen	(Croatia) Ivica Kostelić	(Croatia) Natko Zrnčić-Dim	
1362	25	27 January 2009	(Austria) Schladming	SL _{388}	(Austria) Reinfried Herbst	(Austria) Manfred Pranger	(Croatia) Ivica Kostelić	
		31 January 2009	(Germany) Garmisch-Partenkirchen	DH _{cnx}	fog at mid-course; replaced in Kvitfjell on 6 March 2009			
1363	26	1 February 2009	(Germany) Garmisch-Partenkirchen	SL _{389}	(Italy) Manfred Mölgg	(Italy) Giorgio Rocca	(Austria) Reinfried Herbst	
2009 World Championships (2–15 February)
1364	27	21 February 2009	(Italy) Sestriere	GS _{331}	(Switzerland) Didier Cuche	(Austria) Stephan Görgl	(Austria) Benjamin Raich	
1365	28	22 February 2009	(Italy) Sestriere	SC _{104}	(Austria) Romed Baumann	(France) Julien Lizeroux	(Switzerland) Carlo Janka (Italy) Christof Innerhofer	
1366	29	28 February 2009	(Slovenia) Kranjska Gora	GS _{332}	(United States) Ted Ligety	(Switzerland) Didier Cuche	(Italy) Massimiliano Blardone	
1367	30	1 March 2009	(Slovenia) Kranjska Gora	SL _{390}	(France) Julien Lizeroux	(Italy) Giuliano Razzoli	(Germany) Felix Neureuther	
1368	31	(Note: Downhill from Garmisch-Partenkirchen was rescheduled to Kvitfjell on 6 March 2009)6 March 2009	(Norway) Kvitfjell	DH _{394}	(Canada) Manuel Osborne-Paradis	(Austria) Michael Walchhofer	(Norway) Aksel Lund Svindal	
1369	32	7 March 2009	(Norway) Kvitfjell	DH _{395}	(Austria) Klaus Kröll	(Austria) Michael Walchhofer	(Canada) Manuel Osborne-Paradis	
		8 March 2009	(Norway) Kvitfjell	SG _{cnx}	snowstorm			
1370	33	11 March 2009	(Sweden) Åre	DH _{396}	(Norway) Aksel Lund Svindal	(Switzerland) Didier Cuche	(Sweden) Hans Olsson	
1371	34	12 March 2009	(Sweden) Åre	SG _{146}	(Italy) Werner Heel	(Norway) Aksel Lund Svindal	(Italy) Christof Innerhofer	
1372	35	13 March 2009	(Sweden) Åre	GS _{333}	(Austria) Benjamin Raich	(United States) Ted Ligety	(Switzerland) Didier Cuche	
1373	36	14 March 2009	(Sweden) Åre	SL _{391}	(Austria) Mario Matt	(France) Julien Lizeroux	(France) Jean-Baptiste Grange	

=== Ladies ===
Event key: DH – Downhill, SL – Slalom, GS – Giant slalom, SG – Super giant slalom, SC – Super combined
Race	Season	Date	Place	Type	Winner	Second	Third	Details
1252	1	25 October 2008	(Austria) Sölden	GS _{325}	(Austria) Kathrin Zettel	(Finland) Tanja Poutiainen	(Austria) Andrea Fischbacher	
1253	2	15 November 2008	(Finland) Levi	SL _{365}	(United States) Lindsey Vonn	(Sweden) Maria Pietilä-Holmner	(Germany) Maria Riesch	
1254	3	29 November 2008	(United States) Aspen	GS _{326}	(France) Tessa Worley	(Finland) Tanja Poutiainen	(Austria) Elisabeth Görgl	
1255	4	30 November 2008	(United States) Aspen	SL _{366}	(Czech Republic) Šárka Záhrobská	(Austria) Nicole Hosp	(Finland) Tanja Poutiainen	
1256	5	5 December 2008	(Canada) Lake Louise	DH _{322}	(United States) Lindsey Vonn	(Italy) Nadia Fanchini	(Germany) Maria Riesch	
		6 December 2008	(Canada) Lake Louise	DH _{cnx}	heavy snowfall; replaced in Cortina d'Ampezzo on 23 January 2009			
1257	6	7 December 2008	(Canada) Lake Louise	SG _{158}	(Italy) Nadia Fanchini	(Switzerland) Fabienne Suter (Austria) Andrea Fischbacher		
1258	7	13 December 2008	(Spain) La Molina	GS _{327}	(Finland) Tanja Poutiainen	(Italy) Manuela Mölgg	(Austria) Nicole Hosp	
1259	8	14 December 2008	(Spain) La Molina	SL _{367}	(Germany) Maria Riesch	(United States) Lindsey Vonn	(Austria) Kathrin Zettel	
1260	9	19 December 2008	(Switzerland) St. Moritz	SC _{082}	(Sweden) Anja Pärson	(Austria) Nicole Hosp	(Switzerland) Fabienne Suter	
1261	10	20 December 2008	(Switzerland) St. Moritz	SG _{159}	(Switzerland) Lara Gut	(Switzerland) Fabienne Suter	(Italy) Nadia Fanchini	
		21 December 2008	(Switzerland) St. Moritz	DH _{cnx}	high winds; replaced in Bansko on 27 February 2009			
1262	11	28 December 2008	(Austria) Semmering	GS _{328}	(Austria) Kathrin Zettel	(Italy) Manuela Mölgg	(Switzerland) Lara Gut	
1263	12	29 December 2008	(Austria) Semmering	SL _{368}	(Germany) Maria Riesch	(Finland) Tanja Poutiainen	(United States) Lindsey Vonn	
1264	13	4 January 2009	(Croatia) Zagreb	SL _{369}	(Germany) Maria Riesch	(Italy) Nicole Gius	(Czech Republic) Šárka Záhrobská	
1265	14	10 January 2009	(Slovenia) Maribor	GS _{329}	(Slovenia) Tina Maze	(Italy) Denise Karbon	(Germany) Kathrin Hölzl	
1266	15	11 January 2009	(Slovenia) Maribor	SL _{370}	(Germany) Maria Riesch	(Austria) Kathrin Zettel	(Finland) Tanja Poutiainen	
1267	16	17 January 2009	(Austria) Altenmarkt	SC _{083}	(United States) Lindsey Vonn	(Austria) Kathrin Zettel	(Sweden) Anja Pärson	
1268	17	18 January 2009	(Austria) Altenmarkt	DH _{323}	(Switzerland) Dominique Gisin (Sweden) Anja Pärson		(United States) Lindsey Vonn	
		22 January 2009	(Italy) Cortina d'Ampezzo	SG _{cnx}	blizzard; replaced in Cortina d'Ampezzo on 26 January 2009			
		23 January 2009	(Italy) Cortina d'Ampezzo	DH _{cnx}	heavy snowfall			
1269	18	24 January 2009	(Italy) Cortina d'Ampezzo	DH _{324}	(Switzerland) Dominique Gisin	(United States) Lindsey Vonn	(Sweden) Anja Pärson	
1270	19	25 January 2009	(Italy) Cortina d'Ampezzo	GS _{330}	(Austria) Kathrin Zettel	(Austria) Michaela Kirchgasser	(Austria) Elisabeth Görgl	
1271	20	(Note: Super giant slalom from Cortina d'Ampezzo was rescheduled from 22 to 26 February 2009)26 January 2009	(Italy) Cortina d'Ampezzo	SG _{160}	(Sweden) Jessica Lindell-Vikarby	(Austria) Anna Fenninger	(Switzerland) Andrea Dettling	
1272	21	30 January 2009	(Germany) Garmisch-Partenkirchen	SL _{371}	(United States) Lindsey Vonn	(Germany) Maria Riesch	(Slovenia) Maruša Ferk	
		31 January 2009	(Germany) Garmisch-Partenkirchen	SG _{cnx}	fog: mid-course; replaced in Garmisch-Partenkirchen on 1 February 2009			
1273	22	(Note: Super giant slalom from Garmisch-Partenkirchen was rescheduled from 31 January 2009 to 1 February 2009)1 February 2009	(Germany) Garmisch-Partenkirchen	SG _{161}	(United States) Lindsey Vonn	(Sweden) Anja Pärson	(Sweden) Jessica Lindell-Vikarby	
2009 World Championships (2–15 February)
1274	23	20 February 2009	(Italy) Tarvisio	SC _{084}	(Germany) Maria Riesch	(United States) Lindsey Vonn	(Austria) Kathrin Zettel	
1275	24	21 February 2009	(Italy) Tarvisio	DH _{325}	(Germany) Gina Stechert	(United States) Lindsey Vonn	(Sweden) Anja Pärson	
1276	25	22 February 2009	(Italy) Tarvisio	SG _{162}	(United States) Lindsey Vonn	(Switzerland) Fabienne Suter	(Slovenia) Tina Maze	
1277	26	(Note: Downhill from St. Moritz was rescheduled to Bansko to 27 February 2009)27 February 2009	(Bulgaria) Bansko	DH _{326}	(Switzerland) Fabienne Suter	(Austria) Andrea Fischbacher	(Italy) Nadia Fanchini (United States) Lindsey Vonn	
1278	27	28 February 2009	(Bulgaria) Bansko	DH _{327}	(Austria) Andrea Fischbacher	(Slovenia) Tina Maze	(Switzerland) Fabienne Suter	
1279	28	1 March 2009	(Bulgaria) Bansko	SG _{163}	(United States) Lindsey Vonn	(Switzerland) Fabienne Suter	(Slovenia) Tina Maze	
1280	29	6 March 2009	(Germany) Ofterschwang	GS _{331}	(Austria) Kathrin Zettel	(Austria) Elisabeth Görgl	(Finland) Tanja Poutiainen	
1281	30	7 March 2009	(Germany) Ofterschwang	SL _{372}	(France) Sandrine Aubert	(Sweden) Frida Hansdotter	(Austria) Nicole Hosp	
1282	31	11 March 2009	(Sweden) Åre	DH _{328}	(United States) Lindsey Vonn	(Germany) Maria Riesch	(Austria) Renate Götschl	
1283	32	12 March 2009	(Sweden) Åre	SG _{164}	(United States) Lindsey Vonn	(Italy) Nadia Fanchini	(Germany) Maria Riesch	
1284	33	13 March 2009	(Sweden) Åre	SL _{373}	(France) Sandrine Aubert	(Germany) Fanny Chmelar	(Sweden) Therese Borssén (Czech Republic) Šárka Záhrobská	
1285	34	14 March 2009	(Sweden) Åre	GS _{332}	(Slovenia) Tina Maze	(Finland) Tanja Poutiainen	(Italy) Manuela Mölgg	

=== Nations team event ===
Event key: SC – Super combined (super-G + slalom)
Race	Season	Date	Place	Type	Winner	Second	Third	Details
3	1	15 March 2009	(Sweden) Åre	SC _{003}	Italy Nadia Fanchini; Nicole Gius; Daniela Merighetti; Peter Fill; Werner Heel; Manfred Mölgg	Austria Andrea Fischbacher; Elisabeth Görgl; Kathrin Zettel; Marcel Hirscher; Mario Matt; Hannes Reichelt	Switzerland Sandra Gini; Lara Gut; Fabienne Suter; Marc Berthod; Didier Cuche; Carlo Janka	

== Men's standings ==
=== Overall ===
Rank	after all 36 races	Points
1	(Norway) Aksel Lund Svindal	1009
2	(Austria) Benjamin Raich	1007
3	(Switzerland) Didier Cuche	919
4	(Croatia) Ivica Kostelić	891
5	(France) Jean-Baptiste Grange	887

=== Downhill ===
Rank	after all 9 races	Points
1	(Austria) Michael Walchhofer	470
2	(Austria) Klaus Kröll	424
3	(Switzerland) Didier Défago	363
4	(Norway) Aksel Lund Svindal	323
5	(Canada) Manuel Osborne-Paradis	323

=== Super-G ===
Rank	after all 5 races	Points
1	(Norway) Aksel Lund Svindal	292
2	(Italy) Werner Heel	256
3	(Switzerland) Didier Défago	242
4	(Austria) Hermann Maier	231
5	(Italy) Christof Innerhofer	168

=== Giant slalom ===
Rank	after all 8 races	Points
1	(Switzerland) Didier Cuche	474
2	(Austria) Benjamin Raich	462
3	(United States) Ted Ligety	421
4	(Italy) Massimiliano Blardone	325
5	(Norway) Aksel Lund Svindal	260

=== Slalom ===
Rank	after all 10 races	Points
1	(France) Jean-Baptiste Grange	541
2	(Croatia) Ivica Kostelić	454
3	(France) Julien Lizeroux	419
4	(Austria) Manfred Pranger	415
5	(Austria) Reinfried Herbst	396

=== Super combined ===
Rank	after all 4 races	Points
1	(Switzerland) Carlo Janka	242
2	(Switzerland) Silvan Zurbriggen	231
3	(Austria) Romed Baumann	169
4	(Croatia) Ivica Kostelić	166
5	(Austria) Benjamin Raich	165

== Ladies' standings ==
=== Overall ===
Rank	after all 34 races	Points
1	(United States) Lindsey Vonn	1788
2	(Germany) Maria Riesch	1404
3	(Sweden) Anja Pärson	1059
4	(Austria) Kathrin Zettel	1046
5	(Finland) Tanja Poutiainen	914

=== Downhill ===
Rank	after all 7 races	Points
1	(United States) Lindsey Vonn	502
2	(Austria) Andrea Fischbacher	326
3	(Germany) Maria Riesch	292
4	(Switzerland) Dominique Gisin	291
5	(Italy) Nadia Fanchini	276

=== Super-G ===
Rank	after all 7 races	Points
1	(United States) Lindsey Vonn	461
2	(Italy) Nadia Fanchini	416
3	(Switzerland) Fabienne Suter	408
4	(Sweden) Anja Pärson	251
5	(Switzerland) Andrea Dettling	221

=== Giant slalom ===
Rank	after all 8 races	Points
1	(Finland) Tanja Poutiainen	508
2	(Austria) Kathrin Zettel	501
3	(Slovenia) Tina Maze	368
4	(Austria) Elisabeth Görgl	318
5	(Italy) Denise Karbon	282

=== Slalom ===
Rank	after all 9 races	Points
1	(Germany) Maria Riesch	670
2	(Czech Republic) Šárka Záhrobská	459
3	(United States) Lindsey Vonn	440
4	(Finland) Tanja Poutiainen	406
5	(France) Sandrine Aubert	325

=== Super combined ===
Rank	after all 3 races	Points
1	(Sweden) Anja Pärson	205
2	(United States) Lindsey Vonn	180
3	(Austria) Kathrin Zettel	162
4	(Germany) Maria Riesch	150
5	(Austria) Elisabeth Görgl	113

== Nations Cup ==
=== Overall ===
Rank	after all 70 races	Points
1	Austria	10740
2	Switzerland	7786
3	Italy	5974
4	France	4490
5	United States	4158

=== Men ===
Rank	after all 36 races	Points
1	Austria	5982
2	Switzerland	4238
3	Italy	3426
4	France	2681
5	United States	1881

=== Ladies ===
Rank	after all 34 races	Points
1	Austria	4758
2	Switzerland	3548
3	Germany	2550
4	Italy	2548
5	Sweden	2441
