= Leire Morlans =

Spanish alpine skier (born 1987)

Personal information
- Nationality: Spanish
- Born: 7 March 1987 (age 38); Zaragoza, Spain

Sport
- Sport: Alpine skiing

Leire Morlans (born 7 March 1987) is a Spanish alpine skier. She competed in two events at the 2006 Winter Olympics.
