= Katja Wirth =

Austrian alpine skier

Personal information
- Born: 2 April 1980 (age 46) Bezau, Austria
- Height: 1.68 m (5 ft 6 in)

Skiing career
- Sport: Alpine skiing
- Club: SC Bezau
- Retired: 2007
- Disciplines: Speed events
- World Cup debut: 2000

World Championships
- Teams: 1

World Cup
- Seasons: 8
- Podiums: 1
Medal record
Women's alpine skiing
Representing Austria
World Cup race podiums: Event / 1st / 2nd / 3rd; Downhill / 0 / 1 / 0
International competitions: Event / 1st / 2nd / 3rd; World Junior Championships / 0 / 0 / 1
Junior World Championships
Bronze medal – third place	2000 Quebec	Combined

Katja Wirth (born 2 April 1980) is a former Austrian alpine skier who won the overall title in the Europa Cup in 1995.

She is the sister of the alpine skier Patrick Wirth.

== Career ==
During her career, Wirth achieved 8 results among the top 10 (1 podium) in the World Cup.

== World Cup results ==
Podium

Date	Place	Discipline	Rank
01-03-2003	(Austria) Innsbruck	Downhill	2

== Europa Cup results ==
Wirth has won two discipline cups in the Europa Cup.

- FIS Alpine Ski Europa Cup
  - Super-G: 2002, 2006
