= María Belén Simari Birkner =

Argentine alpine skier (born 1982)

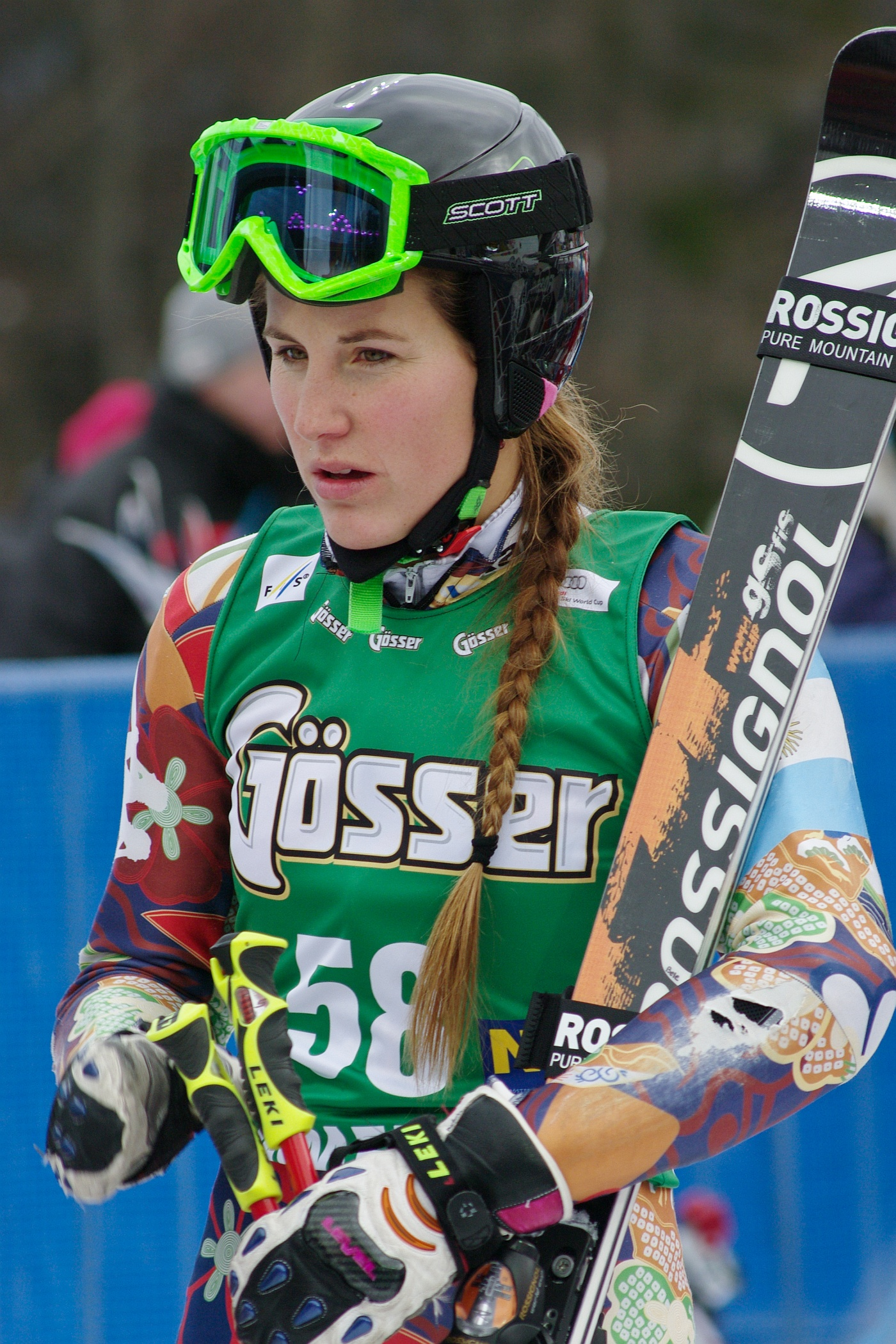
- Maria Belen Simari Birkner in Semmering, 28 December 2010

Personal information
- Born: 18 August 1982 (age 44) Bariloche, Argentina
- Height: 165 cm (65 in)
- Weight: 60 kg (132 lb)

Sport
- Country: Argentina
- Sport: Skiing
- Event: Alpine skiing

María Belén Simari Birkner (born 18 August 1982) is a female skier from Argentina. She has represented Argentina in both the 2006 and the 2010 Winter Olympics, in the Alpine skiing events. She also took part in the 2005 Alpine Skiing World Cup, where she came 28th in the women's combined, and in the FIS Alpine World Ski Championships 2009. She is the sister of fellow alpine skiers Cristian Simari Birkner and Macarena Simari Birkner.

== Results ==
2005 Alpine Skiing World Cup
Combined– 28

2006 Winter Olympics
Giant slalom – DNF
Slalom – 37
Super-G – 47
Combined – 29

FIS Alpine World Ski Championships 2007
Super Combined – 27
Giant slalom – 46
Slalom – DNF

2010 Winter Olympics
Downhill – 29
Slalom – DNF
Giant slalom– 46
Super-G – 31
Combined – DNF
