= Marion Rolland =

French alpine skier

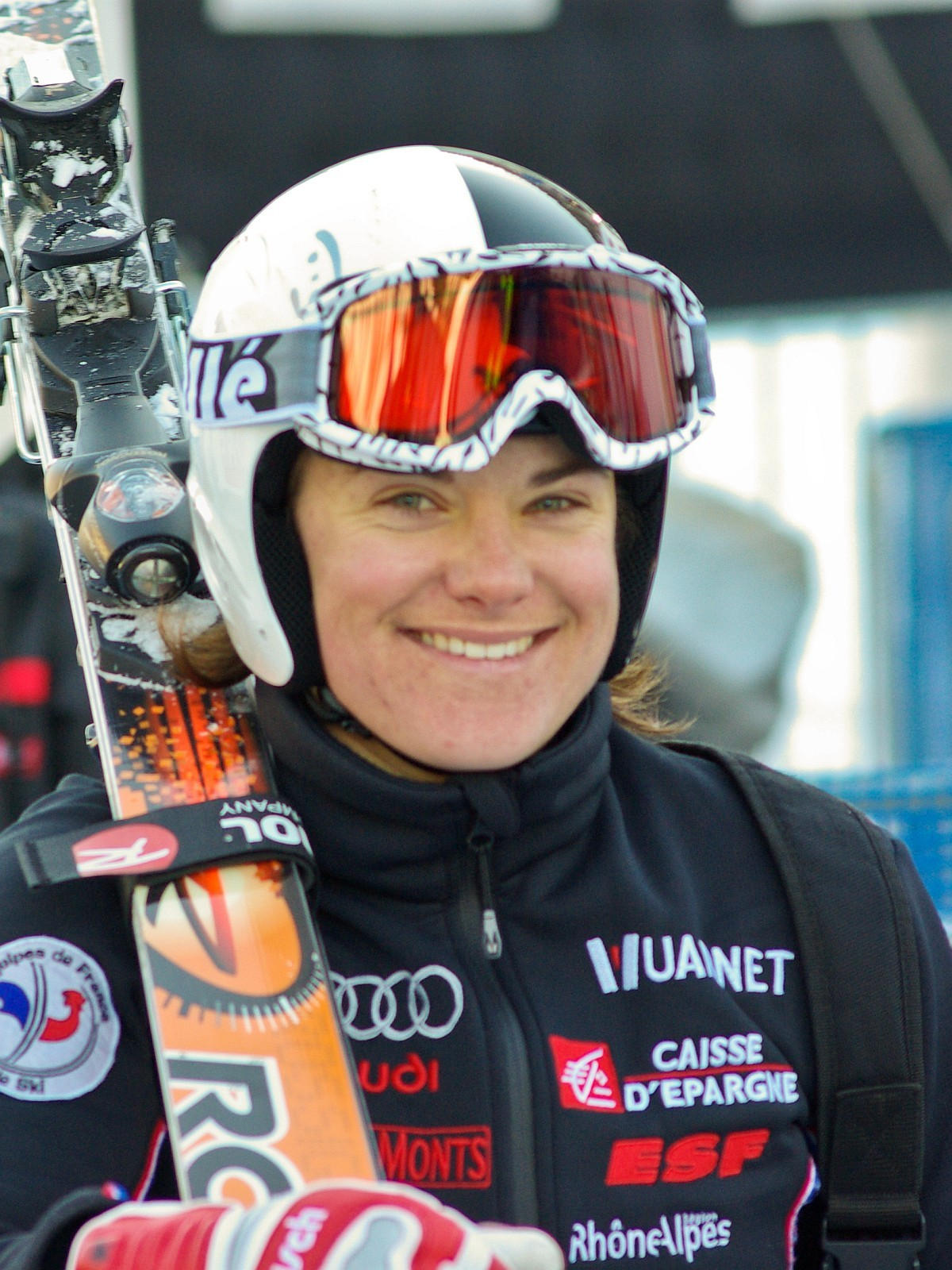
- Rolland in January 2009

Personal information
- Born: 17 October 1982 (age 43) Saint-Martin-d'Hères, Isère, France
- Height: 167 cm (5 ft 6 in)
- Website: marionrolland.com

Skiing career
- Sport: Alpine skiing
- Club: Douanes - Les 2 Alpes
- Disciplines: Downhill, Super G, Combined
- World Cup debut: 30 January 2004 (age 21)

Olympics
- Teams: 1 - (2010)
- Medals: 0

World Championships
- Teams: 3 - (2009, 2011, 2013)
- Medals: 1 (1 gold)

World Cup
- Seasons: 11 - (2004–2013, 2015)
- Wins: 0
- Podiums: 2 - (1 DH, 1 SG)
- Overall titles: 0 - (23rd in 2012)
- Discipline titles: 0 - (6th in DH, 2012)
Medal record
Women's alpine skiing
Representing France
World Championships
Gold medal – first place	2013 Schladming	Downhill

Marion Rolland (born 17 October 1982) is a retired World Cup alpine ski racer from France.

== Racing career ==
Born in Saint-Martin-d'Hères, Isère, she made her World Cup debut in January 2004 and attained her first top-10 in February 2009 in Bansko. She has two World Cup podium finishes, both at the finals at Schladming in March 2012.

After making her first Olympic team in 2010, Rolland took a tumble in the downhill only four seconds from the starting gate at Whistler. She has competed for France in three World Championships, in 2009, 2011 and 2013. Without a podium in the 2013 season, Rolland won the downhill world title at Schladming for her first career win.

Rolland injured her knee ligaments whilst in pre-season training in Chile before the 2013–14 season, which prevented her from competing at the 2014 Winter Olympics in Sochi and from defending her World Championship title at the 2015 Worlds in Beaver Creek. She subsequently announced her retirement from competition in February 2015.

== World Cup top ten finishes ==
- 2 podiums – (1 DH, 1 SG)

Season	Date	Location	Discipline	Place
2009	27 Feb 2009	Bansko, Bulgaria	Downhill	7th
2009	28 Feb 2009	Bansko, Bulgaria	Downhill	6th
2010	5 Dec 2009	Lake Louise, Canada	Downhill	9th
2010	8 Jan 2010	Haus im Ennstal, Austria	Downhill	5th
2010	9 Jan 2010	Haus im Ennstal, Austria	Downhill	4th
2010	30 Jan 2010	St. Moritz, Switzerland	Downhill	7th
2011	3 Dec 2010	Lake Louise, Canada	Downhill	7th
2011	26 Feb 2011	Åre, Sweden	Downhill	7th
2012	28 Jan 2012	St. Moritz, Switzerland	Downhill	9th
2012	18 Feb 2012	Sochi, Russia	Downhill	5th
2012	14 Mar 2012	Schladming, Austria	Downhill	2nd
2012	15 Mar 2012	Schladming, Austria	Super G	3rd
2013	12 Jan 2013	St. Anton, Austria	Downhill	8th
2013	19 Jan 2013	Cortina d'Ampezzo, Italy	Downhill	4th

=== Season standings ===
Season	Age	Overall	Slalom	Giant Slalom	Super G	Downhill	Combined
2005	22	85	–	–	–	37	–
2006	23						
2007	24	125	–	–	–	50	–
2008	25	84	–	–	–	36	38
2009	26	49	–	–	32	18	46
2010	27	30	–	–	32	9	–
2011	28	32	–	–	24	16	–
2012	29	23	–	–	17	6	–
2013	30	27	–	–	23	11	–
