= Macarena Simari Birkner =

Argentine alpine skier (born 1984)

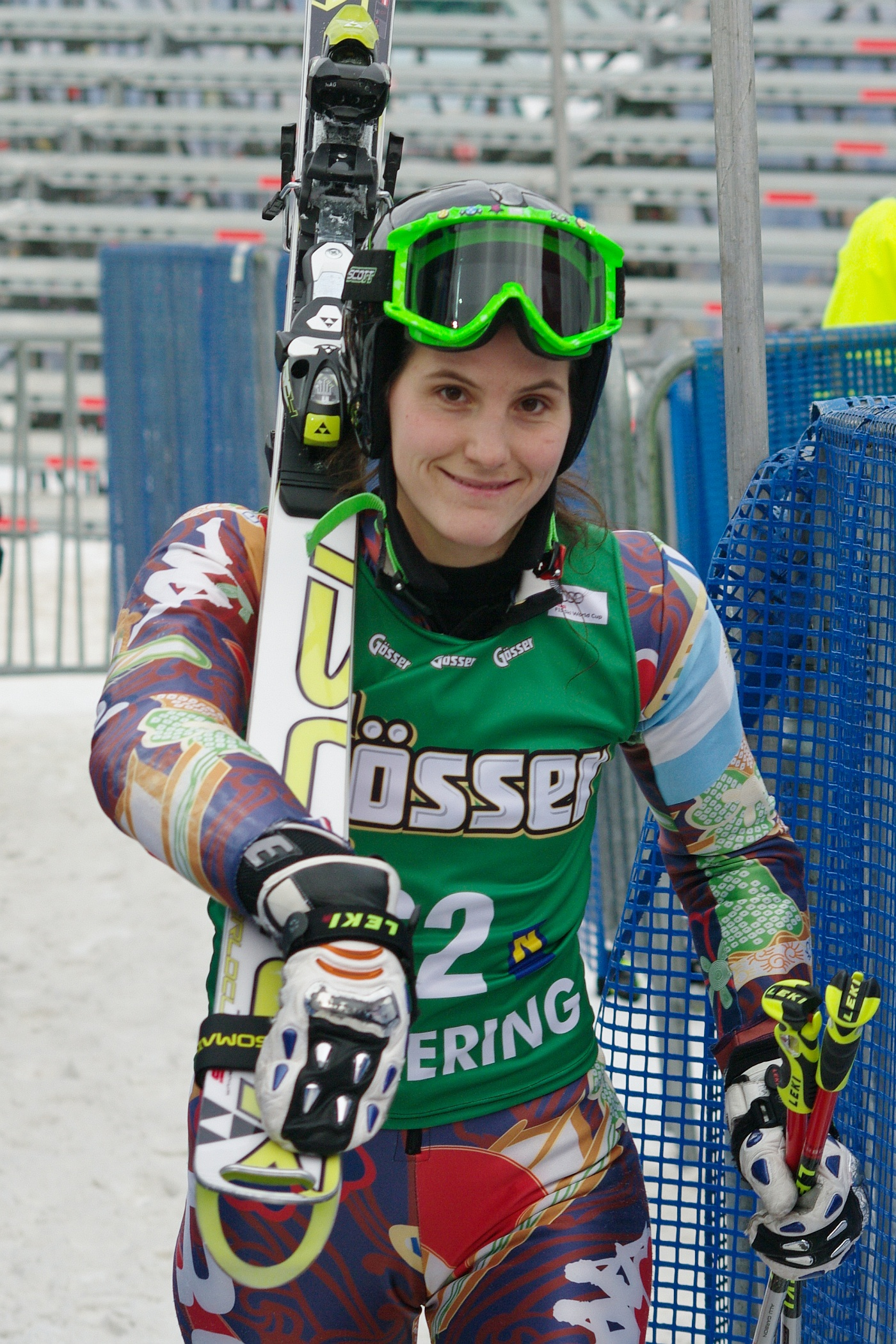

Personal information
- Full name: Macarena María Simari Birkner
- Born: 22 November 1984 (age 41) Bariloche, Argentina
- Height: 168 cm (5 ft 6 in)
- Weight: 58 kg (128 lb)
- Website: www.sbskiteam.com

Sport
- Country: Argentina
- Sport: Skiing
- Event: Alpine Skiing
- Club: Club Andino Bariloche

Achievements and titles
- Olympic finals: 2002 Winter Olympics "Salt Lake City": 17 combine; 31 super G 2006 Winter Olympics "Turin": giant slalom 31 slalom 36 super-G DNF combined 26; 2010 Winter Olympics "Vancouver": downhill 31 slalom 37 & 36 giant slalom 51 & 45 super-G 32 super combined 27 & 26; 2014 Winter Olympics "Sochi": downhill 32 slalom 27 giant slalom 39; Super-G– 26 super combined 20

Macarena María Simari Birkner (born 22 November 1984) is an Argentine skier. She has represented Argentina in 2002, 2006, 2010 and the 2014 Winter Olympics, in the Alpine skiing events. She also took part in the 2005 Alpine Skiing World Cup, where she came 20th in the women's combined, and in the FIS Alpine World Ski Championships 2009. She is the sister of fellow alpine skiers Cristian Simari Birkner and María Belén Simari Birkner. She was in a relationship with British former alpine skier Noel Baxter, with whom she has a child. Simari Birkner has completed all the five Alpine Ski events in both 2010 and 2014 Winter Olympic Games, a record she shares with pluri-medalist Tina Maze.

== Results ==
- 2001 Alpine Skiing World Cup: slalom 31
- 2003 Alpine Skiing World Cup: combined 21
- 2005 Alpine Skiing World Cup: combined 20, slalom 26
- 2006 Winter Olympics: giant slalom 31, slalom 36, super-G DNF, combined 26
- FIS Alpine World Ski Championships 2009: super combined 23, downhill 30, giant slalom 37
- 2010 Winter Olympics: downhill 31, slalom 37 & 36, giant slalom 51 & 45, super-G 32, super combined 27 & 26
- 2011 Alpine Skiing World Cup: uper combined 21, downhill 31 slalom 34
- 2014 Winter Olympics: downhill 32, slalom 27, giant slalom 39, super-G 26, super combined 20
