= Karina Birkelund =

Norwegian alpine skier (born 1980)

Karina Birkelund (born 27 July 1980) is a Norwegian retired alpine skier.

She made her FIS Alpine Ski World Cup debut in March 2003 in Åre, without finishing the race. She collected her first World Cup points with a 27th-place finish in Madonna di Campiglio in December 2003, and then recorded two 16th places. In December 2004, she had her best World Cup placement with a ninth place in the giant slalom in St. Moritz. Her last World Cup appearance was in December 2006.

She is from Søvik, Os, and represented the sports club Fana IL.
