= Libby Ludlow =

American alpine skier (born 1981)

Libby Ludlow (born in Bellevue, Washington on August 26, 1981) is an American former alpine skier who competed in the 2006 Winter Olympics. She retired in 2008 with plans to become a yoga instructor. She went on to teach yoga and has also done Olympics analysis for King5
