= Silvia Berger =

Austrian alpine skier (born 1980)

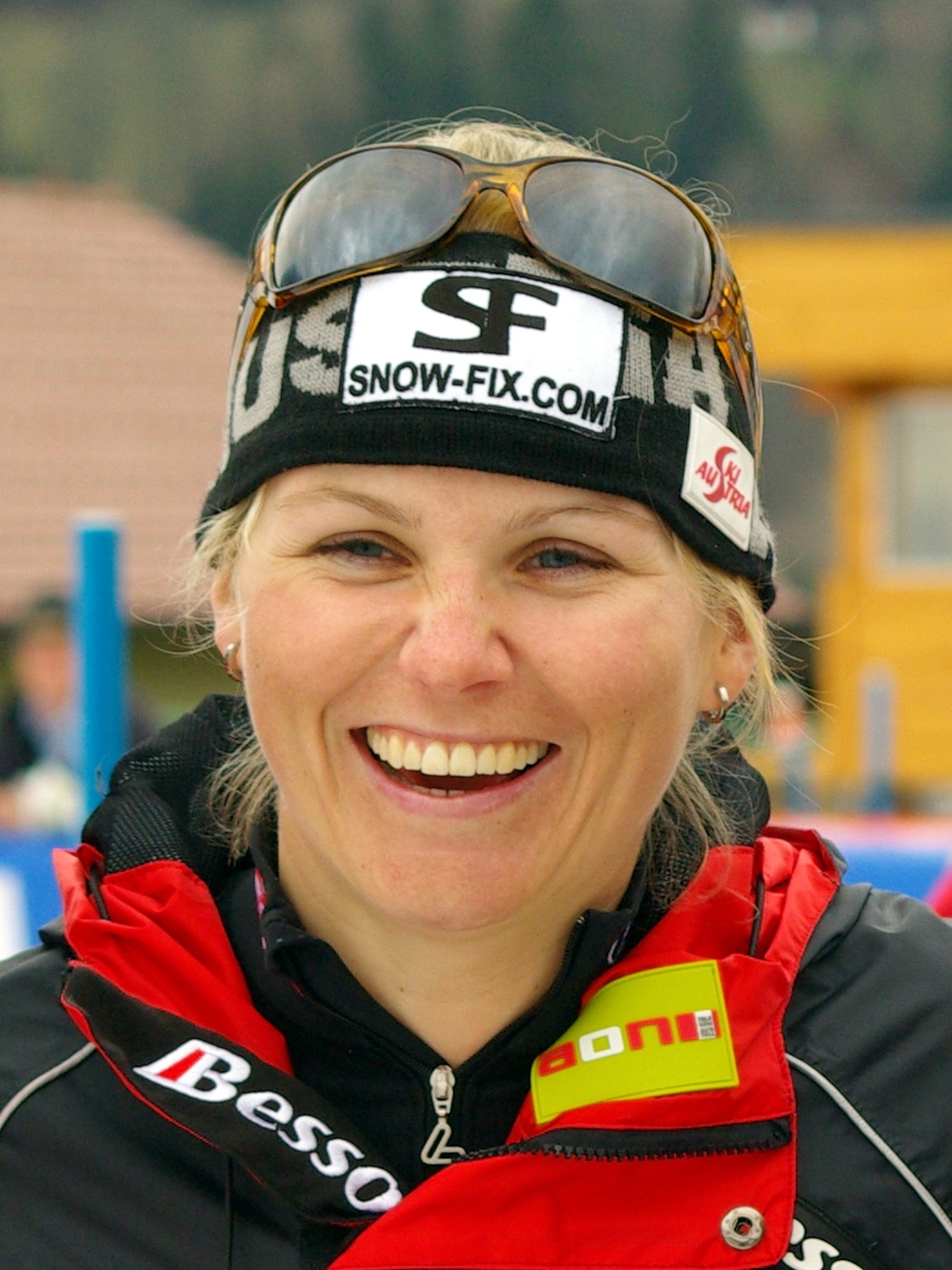

Personal information
- Nationality: (Austria)
- Born: 11 July 1980 (age 46)

Sport
- Sport: Skiing

Silvia Berger (born 11 July 1980) is a former Austrian skier who participated in 128 World Cup races, with three podium appearances. Throughout the entirety of Berger's career, her best was a second-place finish in the giant slalom in Val d’Isere on 9 December 1999. Berger is a native of Westendorf. She also managed two third spot placements, in the Veysonnaz super-G on 11 January 2004 and in the Cortina super-G on 14 January 2005. In her 1999–2000 season, Silvia was crowned Europa Cup Champion in the downhill and giant slalom disciplines, as well as the overall standings.
