= Wendy Siorpaes =

Italian alpine skier (born 1985)

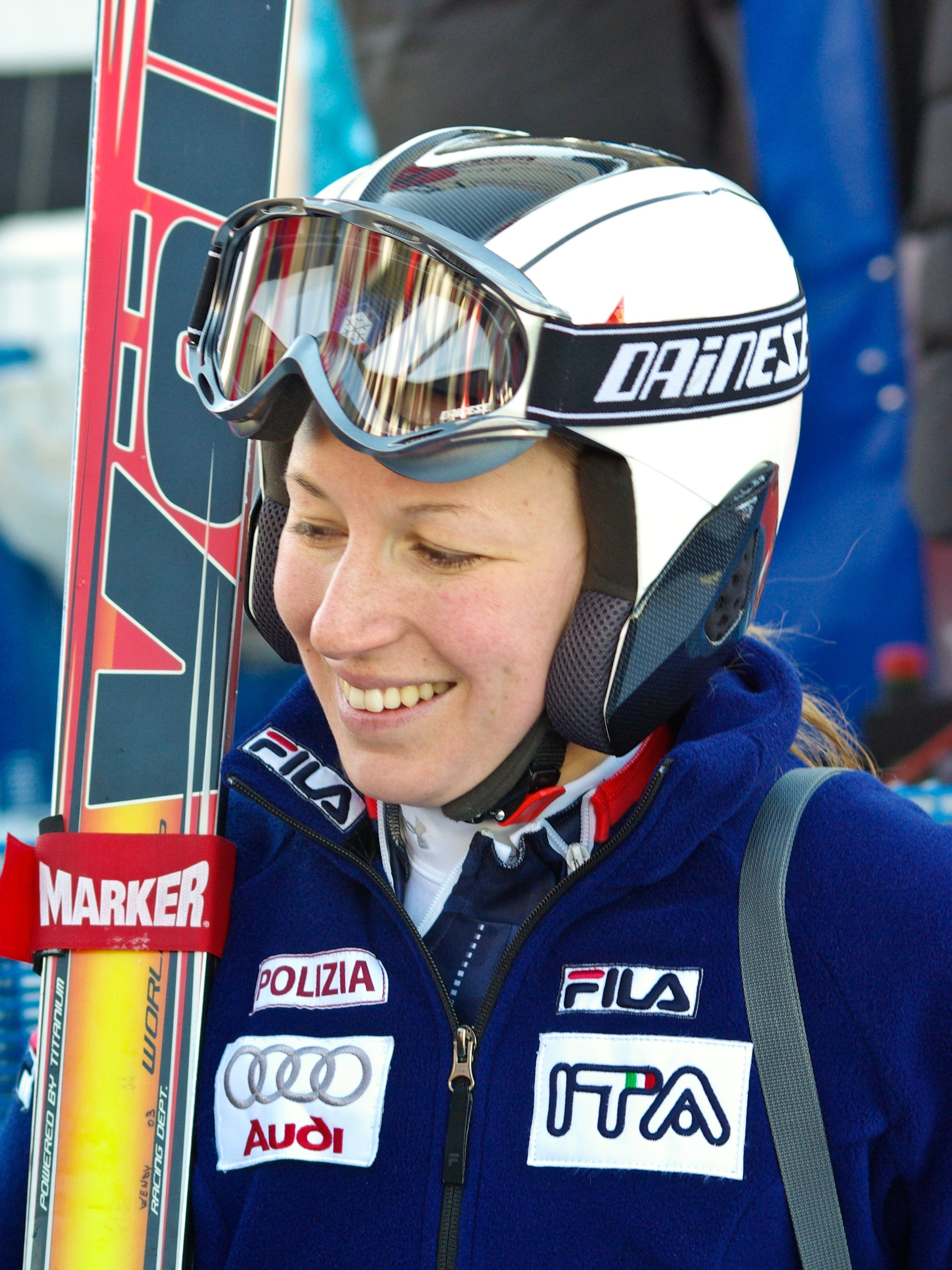
- Siorpaes in 2009

Personal information
- Born: 13 January 1985 (age 41) Innichen, Italy

Skiing career
- Sport: Alpine skiing
- Club: G.S. Fiamme Oro
- Retired: 2010
- Disciplines: Speed events
- World Cup debut: 2001

Olympics
- Teams: 1
- Medals: 0

World Championships
- Teams: 1
- Medals: 0

World Cup
- Seasons: 10
- Podiums: 0

Wendy Siorpaes (born 13 January 1985) is an Italian alpine skier who competed in the 2006 Winter Olympics.
