= Mateja Robnik =

Slovenian alpine skier (born 1987)

Mateja Robnik (born April 6, 1987) is a Slovenian alpine skier.

Robnik represented Slovenia at two skiing world championships, both times in the Giant Slalom. Her World Cup debut was in 2004, but her best result so far is 11th place in Giant Slalom (Aspen, 2008).

== Results in the Slovenian national championship ==
Date	Location	Race	Position
24 March 2006	(Slovenia) Kope	Super G	1 place
15 February 2007	(Slovenia) Krvavec	Slalom (JR)	1 place
22 March 2005	(Slovenia) Maribor	Giant Slalom	2 place
25 March 2007	(Slovenia) Kope	Giant Slalom	2 place
29 March 2008	(Slovenia) Kope	Slalom	2 place
20 March 2008	(Slovenia) Kope	Downhill (JR)	3 place

== Results in the European cup ==
Date	Location	Race	Position
4 February 2008	(Italy) Abetone	Giant Slalom	1 place
10 December 2007	(Italy) Alleghe	Giant Slalom	2 place
13 March 2008	(Italy) Claviere	Giant Slalom	2 place
11 December 2004	(Austria) Schruns	Giant Slalom	3 place
