= Elisabeth Görgl =

Austrian alpine skier

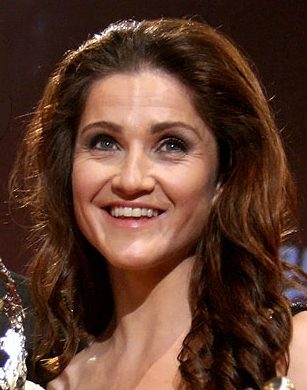
- Görgl in January 2012

Personal information
- Born: 20 February 1981 (age 45) Bruck an der Mur, Styria, Austria
- Height: 1.66 m (5 ft 5 in)
- Website: lizz.at

Skiing career
- Sport: Alpine skiing
- Club: Kapfenberger Sportvereinigung
- Retired: 16 March 2017 (age 36)
- Disciplines: Downhill, super-G giant slalom, slalom, combined
- World Cup debut: 10 March 2000 (age 19)

Olympics
- Teams: 2 – (2006, 2010)
- Medals: 2 (0 gold)

World Championships
- Teams: 7 – (2003–15)
- Medals: 3 (2 gold)

World Cup
- Seasons: 17 – (2000–2001, 2003–2017)
- Wins: 7 – (2 DH, 3 SG, 2 GS)
- Podiums: 42
- Overall titles: 0 – (4th in 2008, '11)
- Discipline titles: 0 – (2nd in SG & GS: '08)
Medal record
Women's alpine skiing
Representing Austria
Olympic Games
Bronze medal – third place	2010 Vancouver	Downhill
Bronze medal – third place	2010 Vancouver	Giant slalom
World Championships
Gold medal – first place	2011 Garmisch-Partenkirchen	Downhill
Gold medal – first place	2011 Garmisch-Partenkirchen	Super-G
Bronze medal – third place	2009 Val d'Isère	Combined

Elisabeth Görgl (born 20 February 1981) is a retired World Cup alpine ski racer from Austria.

Born in Bruck an der Mur, Styria, Görgl made her World Cup debut in March 2000 and has reached World Cup podiums in all five alpine disciplines, with multiple victories in giant slalom, super-G, and downhill. In January 2008, she won her first World Cup race in the giant slalom at Maribor, Slovenia.

At the 2009 World Championships at Val d'Isère, Görgl won a bronze medal in super combined. In 2011 at Garmisch-Partenkirchen, she won two gold medals, the first in the Super-G and a second in the downhill five days later. Her sweep of the two women's speed events marked the third consecutive occurrence at the World Championships – preceded by Lindsey Vonn in 2009 at Val d'Isere and Anja Pärson in 2007 at Åre.

At the 2010 Winter Olympics, Görgl won the bronze medal in the downhill – the same medal in the same event as her mother half a century earlier at the 1960 and the 1964 Winter Olympics. A week later she also won bronze in the giant slalom. Görgl also participated in 4 disciplines in the 2014 Winter Olympics (Downhill, giant slalom, super-G, combined).

On 12 June 2017 she announced her retirement from active skiing. Her last race was a Super-G in Aspen in March the same year.

== Personal ==
Görgl is the daughter of Traudl Hecher (born 1943), an alpine racer for Austria in the early 1960s. She won Olympic bronze medals in the downhill in 1960 (at age 16) and 1964, and remains the youngest Olympic medalist in alpine skiing. Görgl's older brother Stephan (born 1978) is a former World Cup alpine racer; he competed in the giant slalom at the 2006 Winter Olympics.

== World Cup results ==
=== Season standings ===
- Ranking and points

Season	Overall	Slalom	Giant Slalom	Super-G	Downhill	Combined
2003	41 (178)	18 (112)	27 (66)	—	—	—
2004	10 (654)	5 (339)	4 (293)	38 (22)	—	—
2005	12 (511)	22 (99)	10 (225)	12 (137)	34 (26)	11 (24)
2006	10 (602)	36 (19)	16 (155)	11 (172)	8 (227)	15 (29)
2007	11 (568)	35 (39)	11 (171)	23 (96)	14 (184)	8 (78)
2008	4 (1137)	42 (22)	2 (479)	2 (326)	11 (215)	8 (95)
2009	8 (755)	—	4 (333)	14 (133)	10 (176)	5 (113)
2010	6 (591)	29 (49)	20 (67)	2 (300)	26 (65)	4 (110)
2011	4 (992)	33 (41)	4 (236)	9 (137)	4 (333)	4 (185)
2012	6 (987)	—	7 (333)	9 (205)	3 (384)	10 (50)
2013	19 (381)	—	15 (160)	14 (101)	24 (84)	13 (36)
2014	8 (640)	—	31 (42)	4 (240)	7 (334)	11 (24)
2015	8 (638)	—	25 (69)	7 (214)	4 (337)	14 (18)
2016	28 (363)	—	—	14 (154)	13 (209)	—
2017	54 (145)	—	—	16 (116)	39 (29)	—

=== Race victories ===
- 7 wins – (2 DH, 3 SG, 2 GS)
- 42 podiums – (14 DH, 6 SG, 15 GS, 3 SL, 1 PS, 3 SC)

Season	Date	Location	Discipline
2008	12 Jan 2008	Maribor, Slovenia	Giant slalom
2008	15 Mar 2008	Bormio, Italy	Giant slalom
2010	6 Dec 2009	Lake Louise, Canada	Super-G
2012	7 Jan 2012	Bad Kleinkirchheim, Austria	Downhill
2014	11 Jan 2014	Altenmarkt, Austria	Downhill
2014	23 Jan 2014	Cortina d'Ampezzo, Italy	Super-G
2015	21 Dec 2014	Val-d'Isère, France	Super-G

== World championships ==
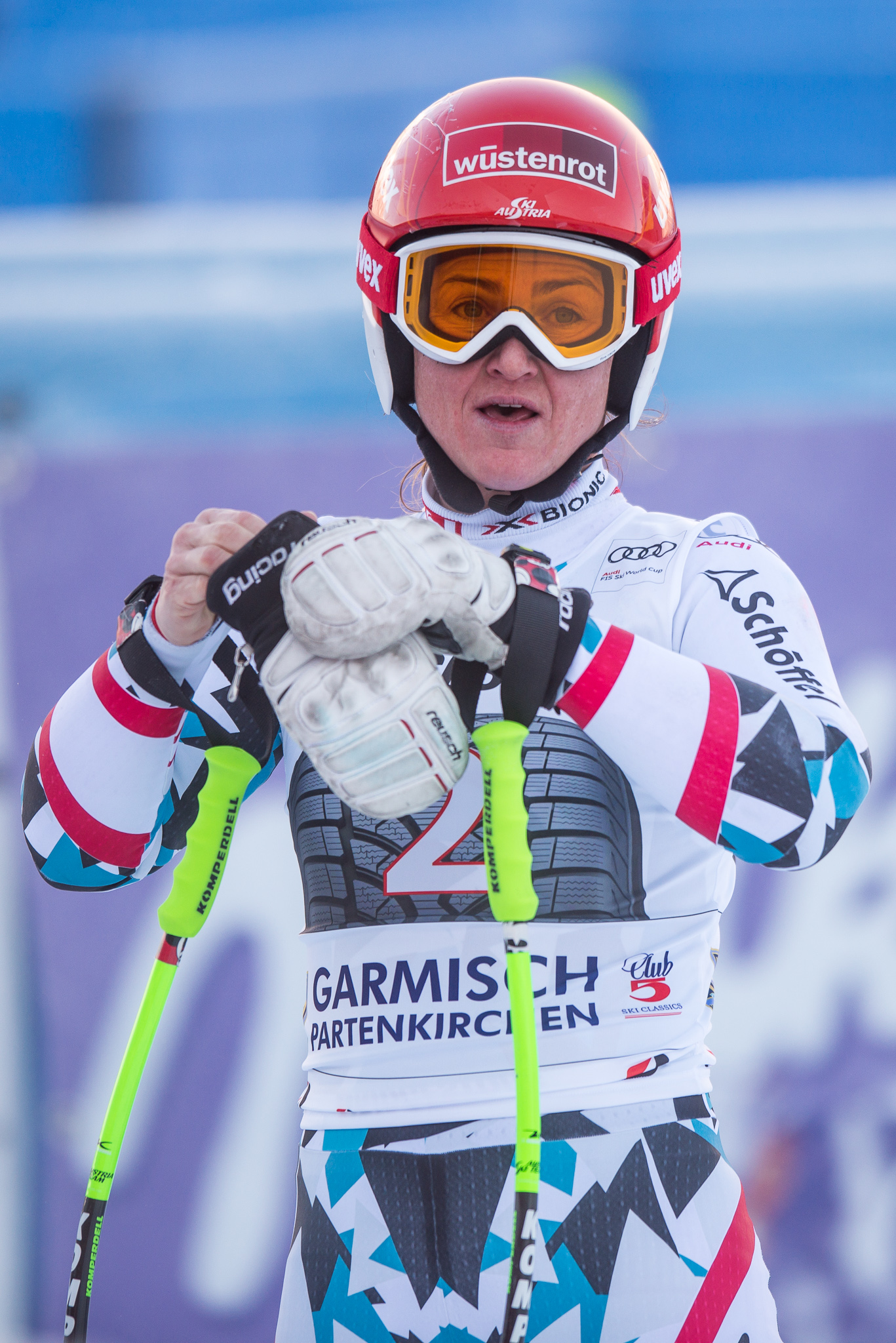
Görgl in 2017

Year	Age	Slalom	Giant slalom	Super-G	Downhill	Combined
2003	21	DNF1	—	—	—	—
2005	23	DSQ1	7	—	—	8
2007	25	—	—	—	18	—
2009	27	31	10	6	4	3
2011	29	—	10	1	1	5
2013	31	—	23	11	10	6
2015	33	—	—	DNF1	6	—

== Winter Olympics ==
Year	Age	Slalom	Giant slalom	Super-G	Downhill	Combined
2006	24	—	—	—	DNF	—
2010	28	7	3	5	3	18
2014	32	—	11	DNF	16	DNF2

Awards
Preceded by Andrea Fischbacher	Austrian Sportswoman of the year 2011	Succeeded by Marlies Schild
