= Barbara Kleon =

Italian alpine skier (born 1980)

Barbara Kleon (born 17 October 1980) is a retired Italian alpine skier.

She competed at the 1999 Junior World Championships, a 14th place being her best result.

She made her FIS Alpine Ski World Cup debut in October 1999 in Tignes, but did not finish a race until January 2001 in Cortina d'Ampezzo. She collected her first World Cup points with a 28th place in February 2001 in Lenzerheide, and improved her career best slightly to 27th place in Lake Louise in November 2001 and 25th in Lienz in December. 2003 represented a breakthrough as she improved to 18th in Innsbruck in March, and 6th in December in Lake Louise. This would be her first and only time in the top 10. Her last World Cup outing came in December 2014 in St. Moritz, where she failed to finish.
