= Jessica Lindell-Vikarby =

Swedish alpine skier

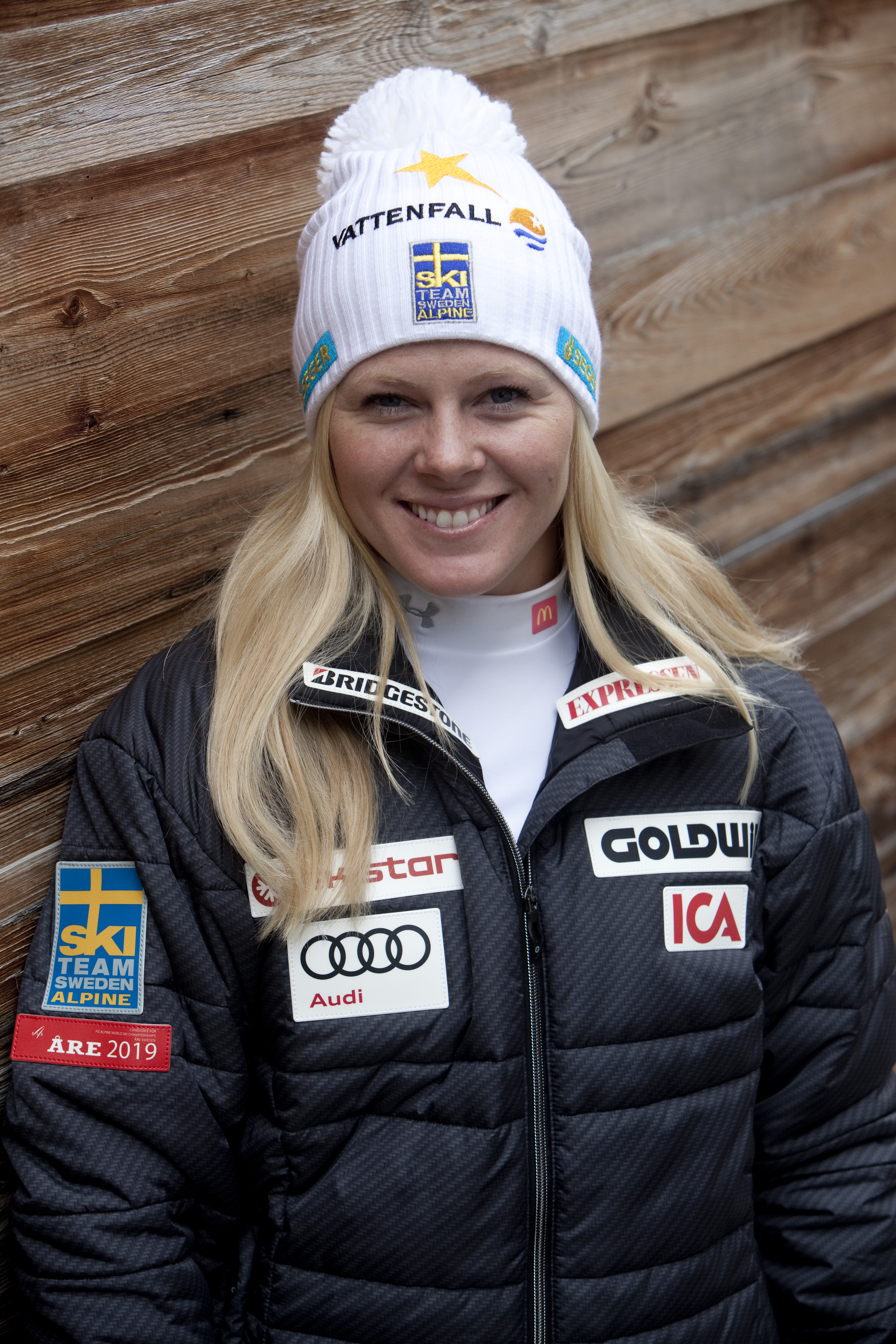
- Jessica Lindell-Vikarby in April 2014

Personal information
- Born: 7 February 1984 (age 42) Huddinge, Sweden
- Height: 1.69 m (5 ft 7 in)
- Website: jessicalindellvikarby

Skiing career
- Sport: Alpine skiing
- Club: Huddinge SK
- Disciplines: Giant slalom, super-G, Downhill, combined
- World Cup debut: 26 October 2002 (age 18)

Olympics
- Teams: 3 – (2006, 2010, 2014)
- Medals: 0

World Championships
- Teams: 7 – (2003–15)
- Medals: 1 (0 gold)

World Cup
- Seasons: 12 – (2003, 2005–2015)
- Wins: 2 – (1 SG, 1 GS)
- Podiums: 8 – (3 SG, 5 GS)
- Overall titles: 0 – (11th in 2014)
- Discipline titles: 0 – (2nd in GS, 2014)
Medal record
Women's alpine skiing
Representing Sweden
World Championships
Bronze medal – third place	2015 Beaver Creek	Giant slalom
Junior World Ski Championships
Gold medal – first place	2003 Briançonnais	Giant slalom

Jessica Lindell-Vikarby (born 7 February 1984) is a retired Swedish World Cup alpine ski racer.

Born in Huddinge, Stockholm County, she made her World Cup debut in October 2002, and has two World Cup victories and seven podium finishes. Lindell-Vikarby has competed in three Olympics and six World Championships.

On 14 July 2015, she announced her retirement from alpine skiing.

== World Cup results ==
=== Season standings ===
Season	Age	Overall	Slalom	Giant Slalom	Super-G	Downhill	Combined
2003	19	52	–	32	53	25	9
2004	20	out for season					
2005	21	65	–	38	–	24	—
2006	22	34	–	31	32	19	9
2007	23	67	–	27	34	52	42
2008	24	32	–	19	15	52	27
2009	25	24	–	33	6	37	33
2010	26	49	–	33	23	41	22
2011	27	48	–	37	17	46	31
2012	28	18	–	10	10	—	—
2013	29	34	–	8	26	—	—
2014	30	11	–	2	33	—	—

=== Race podiums ===
- 2 wins – (1 SG, 1 GS)
- 7 podiums – (3 SG, 4 GS)

Season	Date	Location	Discipline	Place
2008	2 Dec 2007	Lake Louise, Canada	Super-G	3rd
2009	26 Jan 2009	Cortina d'Ampezzo, Italy	Super-G	1st
2009	2 Feb 2009	Garmisch-Partenkirchen, Germany	Super-G	3rd
2014	1 Dec 2013	Beaver Creek, USA	Giant slalom	1st
2014	15 Dec 2013	St. Moritz, Switzerland	Giant slalom	2nd
2014	28 Dec 2013	Lienz, Austria	Giant slalom	2nd
2014	7 Mar 2014	Åre, Sweden	Giant slalom	3rd
