= Caroline Lalive =

American alpine skier (born 1979)

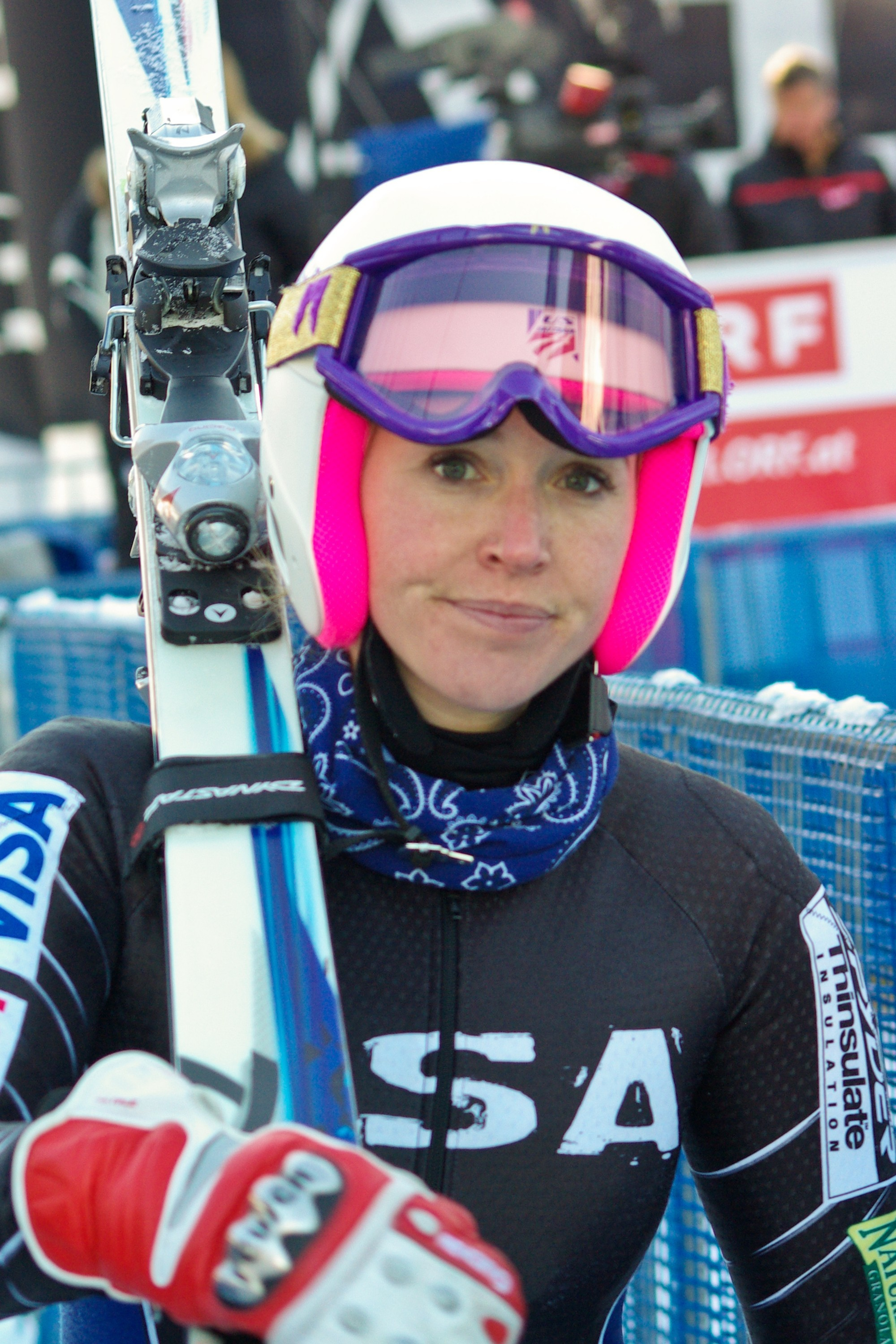

Personal information
- Born: August 10, 1979 (age 47) Truckee, California, US

Sport
- Sport: alpine skiing

Caroline Lalive (born August 10, 1979) is an American former alpine skier who competed in the 1998 Winter Olympics and 2002 Winter Olympics. She was born in Truckee, California.

Lalive married fellow Olympic skier Nelson Carmichael in 2012, and they have one child (born 2015).
