= Gina Stechert =

German alpine skier (born 1987)

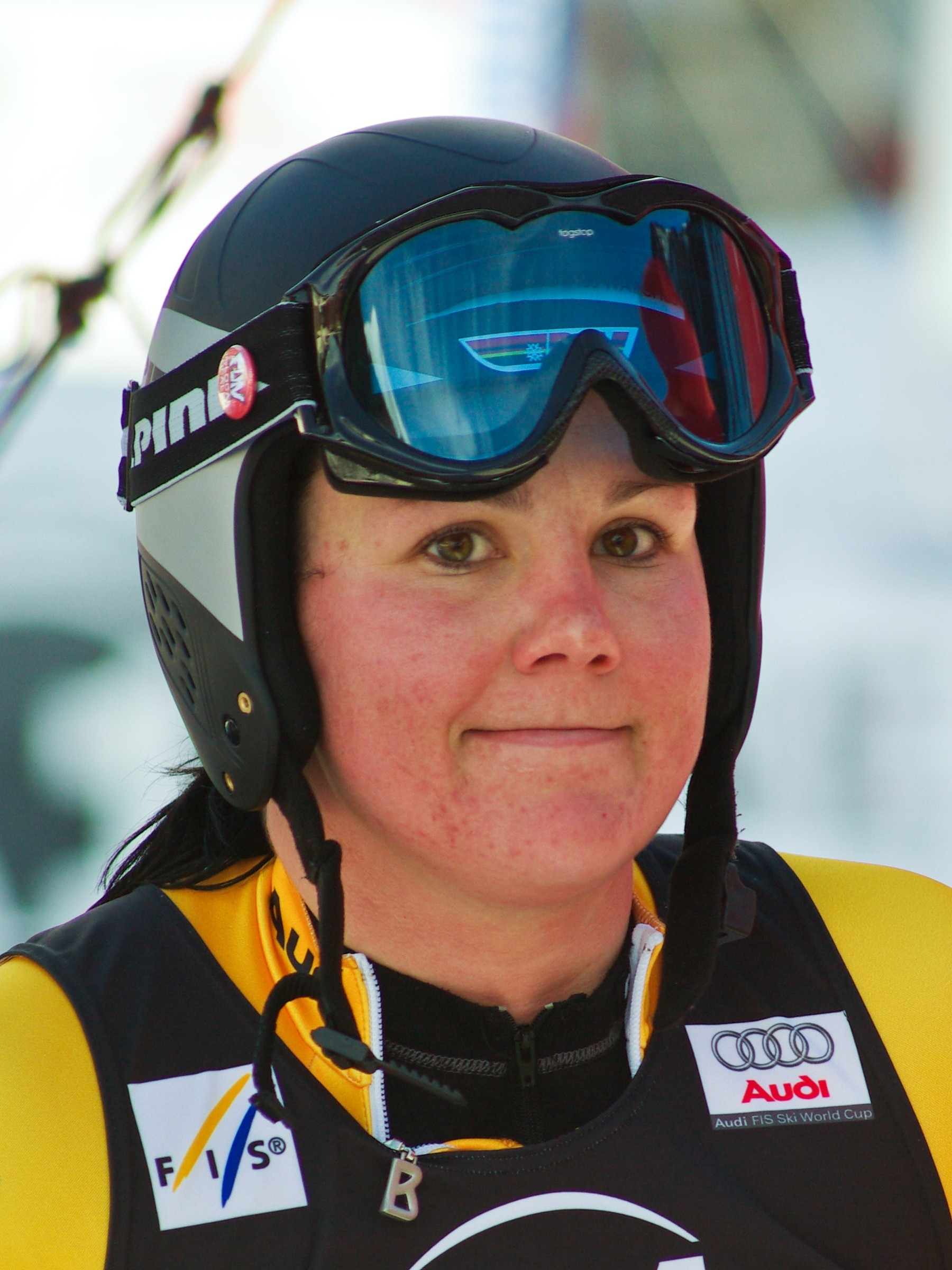
Gina Stechert

Gina Stechert (born 20 November 1987 in Oberstdorf) is a German alpine skier whose best discipline is the combined. She represented Germany at the 2010 Winter Olympics.
