= Ingrid Jacquemod =

French alpine skier (born 1978)

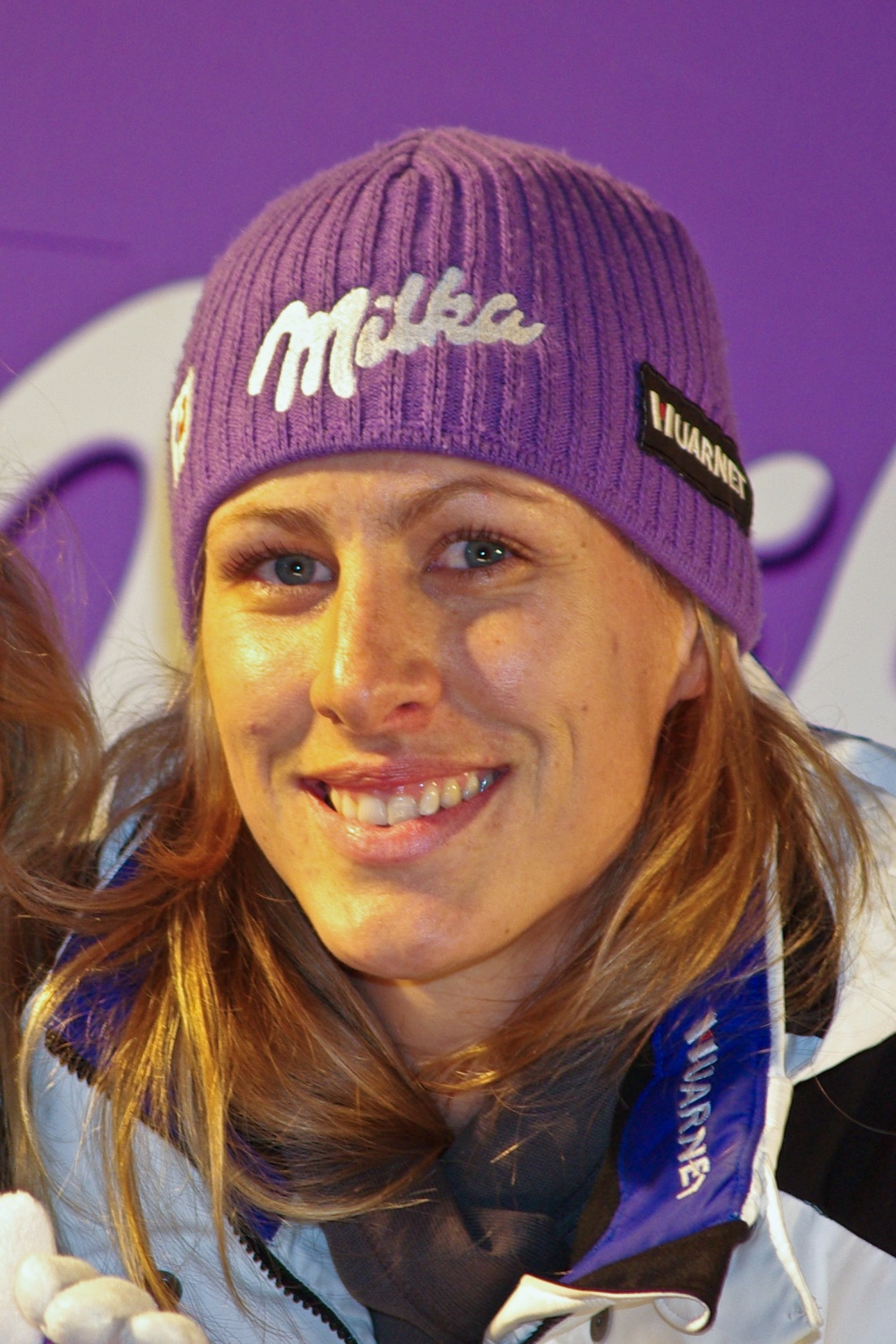

Personal information
- Born: 23 September 1978
- Height: 1.76 m (5 ft 9 in)

Sport
- Sport: Skiing
Medal record
Women's alpine skiing
Representing France
World Championships
Bronze medal – third place	2005 Bormio	Team event

Ingrid Jacquemod (born 23 September 1978) is a French alpine skier who grew up in Val-d'Isère. She has appeared in two Winter Olympics, in 2002 and 2006.

== Olympics results ==
2006

- Downhill – 16th
- Super-G – 32nd
- Giant slalom – 21st

2002

- Downhill – 23rd
- Super-G – 22nd

== World championships ==
Jacquemod appeared at the World Championships since 2001, her best single race position being fifth, in the 2005 downhill race in Santa Caterina.

== World Cup ==
Jacquemod made her World Cup debut on 21 November 1996 at the age of eighteen, in a giant slalom race in Park City, Utah. Her first finish was on 18 January the next year, where she finished 21st. Jacquemod has won one World Cup race, in January 2005 in a downhill race in Santa Caterina.
