= Emily Brydon =

Canadian alpine skier (born 1980)

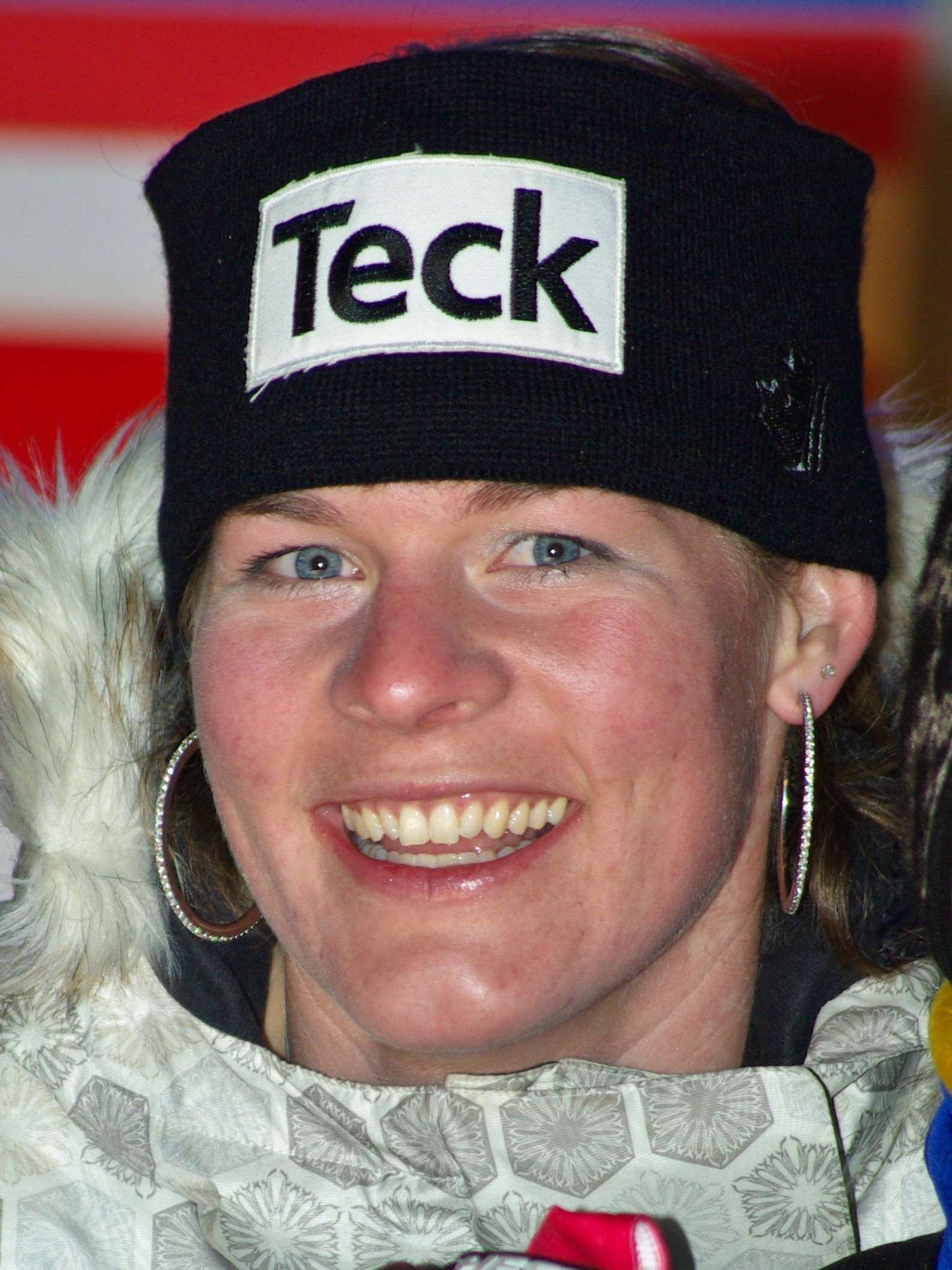

Personal information
- Born: April 21, 1980 (age 46) Fernie, British Columbia, Canada

Skiing career
- Sport: Alpine skiing
- Club: Fernie Snow Valley Ski Club
- Disciplines: Downhill, super-G, Giant slalom, slalom, combined
- World Cup debut: November 27, 1998 (age 18)

Olympics
- Teams: 3

World Championships
- Teams: 5

World Cup
- Seasons: 10
- Wins: 1
- Podiums: 9

Emily Brydon (born April 21, 1980, in Fernie, British Columbia) is a Canadian former alpine skier and 3 time Olympian. She reached the podium on the World Cup circuit nine times—five in downhill, three in super G, and one in combined—and won once, a super G in 2008 in St. Moritz. She competed in the 2006 Winter Olympics. Her coaches were Heinzpeter Platter, Rob Boyd, and Brett Zagozewski. She also competed in the 2010 Winter Olympics but fell and did not finish.
