= FIS Alpine World Ski Championships 2007 – Women's giant slalom =

Below are the results of the FIS Alpine World Ski Championships 2007 women's giant slalom which took place on 13 February 2007.

== Results ==
Rank	Athlete	Nation	1st Run	2nd Run	Behind
1	Nicole Hosp	Austria	1:13.80	2:31.72	0
2	Maria Pietilä Holmner	Sweden	1:13.84	2:32.57	+0.85
3	Denise Karbon	Italy	1:14.54	2:32.69	+0.97
4	Michaela Kirchgasser	Austria	1:14.94	2:32.87	+1.15
5	Julia Mancuso	United States	1:13.55	2:32.96	+1.24
6	Kathrin Hölzl	Germany	1:14.43	2:33.02	+1.30
7	Anna Ottosson	Sweden	1:13.80	2:33.05	+1.33
8	Viktoria Rebensburg	Germany	1:15.21	2:33.27	+1.55
9	Kathrin Zettel	Austria	1:14.57	2:33.30	+1.58
10	Genevève Simard	Canada	1:13.68	2:33.34	+1.62
11	Manuela Mölgg	Italy	1:14.29	2:33.36	+1.64
12	Šárka Záhrobská	Czech Republic	1:13.68	2:33.44	+1.72
13	Fabienne Suter	Switzerland	1:14.62	2:33.46	+1.74
14	Tanja Poutiainen	Finland	1:14.09	2:33.69	+1.97
15	Ingrid Jacquemod	France	1:14.64	2:33.99	+2.27
16	Marion Bertrand	France	1:14.46	2:34.01	+2.29
17	Olivia Bertrand	France	1:14.62	2:34.16	+2.44
18	Aurélie Santon	France	1:15.60	2:34.23	+2.51
19	Fränzi Aufdenblatten	Switzerland	1:15.17	2:34.56	+2.84
20	Nicole Gius	Italy	1:14.73	2:34.57	+2.85
21	Veronika Zuzulová	Slovakia	1:15.38	2:34.66	+2.94
22	Tina Maze	Slovenia	1:14.71	2:34.69	+2.97
23	Maria Riesch	Germany	1:15.64	2:34.73	+3.01
24	Karen Putzer	Italy	1:15.29	2:34.74	+3.02
25	Shona Rubens	Canada	1:15.61	2:34.79	+3.07
26	Maruša Ferk	Slovenia	1:15.61	2:34.81	+3.09
27	Chemmy Alcott	United Kingdom	1:15.52	2:34.94	+3.22
28	Jessica Lindell-Vikarby	Sweden	1:15.51	2:35.56	+3.84
29	Libby Ludlow	United States	1:15.40	2:35.68	+3.96
30	Nina Løseth	Norway	1:15.87	2:36.34	+4.62
31	Sanni Leinonen	Finland	1:16.56	2:36.71	+4.99
32	Britt Janyk	Canada	1:15.87	2:36.85	+5.13
33	Therese Borssén	Sweden	1:16.29	2:36.89	+5.17
34	Ana Jelušić	Croatia	1:16.27	2:37.34	+5.62
35	Resi Stiegler	United States	1:17.04	2:38.08	+6.36
36	Jessica C. Kelley	United States	1:16.27	2:38.13	+6.41
37	Carolina Ruiz Castillo	Spain	1:16.04	2:38.16	+6.44
38	Lene Løseth	Norway	1:16.98	2:38.77	+7.05
39	Mateja Robnik	Slovenia	1:16.64	2:38.97	+7.25
40	Petra Zakouřilová	Czech Republic	1:17.91	2:40.37	+8.65
41	Soňa Maculová	Slovakia	1:18.15	2:40.66	+8.94
42	Brigitte Acton	Canada	1:16.98	2:41.13	+9.41
43	Hiromi Yumoto	Japan	1:19.25	2:41.87	+10.15
44	Maria Kirkova	Bulgaria	1:19.30	2:42.70	+10.98
45	Dagný L. Kristjánsdóttir	Iceland	1:19.08	2:43.81	+12.09
46	María Belén Simari Birkner	Argentina	1:20.39	2:45.18	+13.46
47	Kirsten McGarry	Ireland	1:20.34	2:45.38	+13.66
48	Tiiu Nurmberg	Estonia	1:21.56	2:47.58	+15.86
49	Bianca Andreea-Narea	Romania	1:21.74	2:48.34	+16.62
50	Sophie Sølling	Denmark	1:21.27	2:49.21	+17.49
51	Marija Trmčić	Serbia	1:22.33	2:49.52	+17.80
52	Anastasiya Skryabina	Ukraine	1:22.61	2:51.67	+19.95
53	Anna Berecz	Hungary	1:22.37	2:51.99	+20.27
54	Evija Benhena	Latvia	1:25.35	2:57.97	+26.25
55	Liyan Miao	China	1:26.65	2:59.83	+28.11
56	Tuğba Daşdemir	Turkey	1:27.39	3:00.86	+29.14
57	Oksana Mashchakevich	Ukraine	1:28.90	3:03.42	+31.70
58	Ivana Ivcevska	Macedonia	1:29.76	3:04.83	+33.11
59	Qin Xiyue	China	1:29.64	3:05.82	+34.10
60	Duygu Ulusoy	Turkey	1:31.77	3:06.85	+35.13
61	Jing Liu	China	1:30.77	3:09.90	+38.18
62	Olga Gogol	Macedonia	1:33.91	3:15.12	+43.40
63	Yang Li	China	1:33.32	3:17.49	+45.77
64	Lida Zvoznikova	Kyrgyzstan	1:39.89	3:24.38	+52.66
—	Anja Pärson	Sweden	1:13.99	DNF	—
—	Ana Drev	Slovenia	1:15.79	DNF	—
—	Tina Weirather	Liechtenstein	1:15.92	DNF	—
—	Agnieszka Gąsienica-Daniel	Poland	1:16.48	DNF	—
—	Rabea Grand	Switzerland	1:16.71	DNF	—
—	Sofija Novoselić	Croatia	1:16.95	DNF	—
—	Carolin Fernsebner	Germany	1:17.03	DNF	—
—	Jelena Lolović	Serbia	1:17.25	DNF	—
—	Eva Hučková	Slovakia	1:17.65	DNF	—
—	Nina Penzešová	Slovakia	1:17.85	DNF	—
—	Žana Novaković	Bosnia and Herzegovina	1:20.62	DNF	—
—	Mireia Clemente	Spain	1:20.80	DNF	—
—	Tamara Gisem	Ukraine	1:25.87	DNF	—
—	Vera Eremenko	Kazakhstan	1:29.45	DNF	—
—	Eva Kurfürstová	Czech Republic	1:18.59	DNS	—
—	Marlies Schild	Austria	DNF	—	—
—	Nadia Styger	Switzerland	DNF	—	—
—	Lucie Hrstková	Czech Republic	DNF	—	—
—	Dagmara Krzyżyńska	Poland	DNF	—	—
—	Mami Sekizuka	Japan	DNF	—	—
—	Alexandra Coletti	Monaco	DNF	—	—
—	Leyre Morlans	Spain	DNF	—	—
—	Iveta Benhena	Latvia	DNF	—	—
—	Liene Fimbauere	Latvia	DNF	—	—
—	Kristīne Poška	Latvia	DNF	—	—
—	Mia Ighniades	Lebanon	DNF	—	—
—	Mathalie Diab	Lebanon	DNF	—	—
—	Tea Palić	Croatia	DNS	—	—
