= FIS Alpine World Ski Championships 2007 – Women's slalom =

Event: Slalom Ladies

Date: February 16, 2007

1st Run Start Time: 17:00 CET

2nd Run Start Time: 20:00 CET

== Results ==
Rank	Athlete	Nation	1st Run	2nd Run	Behind
1	Šárka Záhrobská	Czech Republic	52.77	1:43.91	0
2	Marlies Schild	Austria	53.00	1:44.02	+0.11
3	Anja Pärson	Sweden	52.89	1:44.07	+0.16
4	Ana Jelušić	Croatia	53.44	1:44.41	+0.50
5	Kathrin Zettel	Austria	53.25	1:44.73	+0.82
6	Monika Bergmann-Schmuderer	Germany	53.50	1:44.81	+0.90
7	Therese Borssén	Sweden	53.69	1:44.82	+0.91
8	Resi Stiegler	United States	53.74	1:44.98	+1.07
9	Michaela Kirchgasser	Austria	53.96	1:45.53	+1.62
10	Nina Løseth	Norway	54.63	1:46.06	+2.15
11	Maria Pietilä Holmner	Sweden	54.70	1:46.23	+2.32
12	Nicole Gius	Italy	54.54	1:46.24	+2.33
13	Veronika Zuzulová	Slovakia	54.78	1:46.29	+2.38
14	Tanja Poutiainen	Finland	54.65	1:46.33	+2.42
15	Sandra Gini	Switzerland	55.00	1:46.38	+2.47
16	Anna Ottosson	Sweden	53.92	1:46.47	+2.56
17	Nicole Hosp	Austria	55.11	1:46.69	+2.78
18	Sandrine Aubert	France	54.67	1:46.96	+3.05
19	Anne-Sophie Barthet	France	55.33	1:47.07	+3.16
20	Manuela Mölgg	Italy	54.74	1:47.08	+3.17
21	Katarzyna Karasińska	Poland	54.26	1:47.28	+3.37
22	Florine de Leymarie	France	55.15	1:47.34	+3.43
23	Lene Løseth	Norway	55.41	1:47.53	+3.62
23	Kaylin Richardson	United States	55.25	1:47.53	+3.62
25	Rabea Grand	Switzerland	54.91	1:47.57	+3.66
26	Maruša Ferk	Slovenia	55.23	1:47.73	+3.82
27	Sofija Novoselić	Croatia	55.55	1:47.96	+4.05
28	Petra Zakouřilová	Czech Republic	56.03	1:48.24	+4.33
29	Karen Persyn	Belgium	55.49	1:48.88	+4.97
30	Sanni Leinonen	Finland	56.20	1:49.36	+5.45
31	Petra Robnik	Slovenia	56.37	1:50.51	+6.60
32	Vanessa Vidal	France	56.38	1:50.67	+6.76
33	Marina Nigg	Liechtenstein	57.13	1:50.95	+7.04
34	Emily Brydon	Canada	57.30	1:51.38	+7.47
35	Mami Sekizuka	Japan	57.41	1:51.89	+7.98
36	Hiromi Yumoto	Japan	57.22	1:52.95	+9.04
37	Mojca Rataj	Bosnia and Herzegovina	57.52	1:52.96	+9.05
38	Soňa Maculová	Slovakia	58.88	1:55.12	+11.21
39	Žana Novaković	Bosnia and Herzegovina	1:00.15	1:56.81	+12.90
40	Michaela Smutná	Czech Republic	1:03.50	1:58.52	+14.61
41	Anastasiya Skryabina	Ukraine	1:00.75	1:58.90	+14.99
42	Anna Berecz	Hungary	1:01.41	2:00.53	+16.62
43	Tuğba Daşdemir	Turkey	1:02.11	2:01.24	+17.33
44	Liyan Miao	China	1:02.88	2:02.90	+18.99
45	Maria Kirkova	Bulgaria	58.66	2:04.76	+20.85
46	Kristīne Poška	Latvia	1:06.00	2:08.05	+24.14
47	Vera Eremenko	Kazakhstan	1:05.48	2:08.06	+24.15
48	Oksana Mashchakevich	Ukraine	1:06.06	2:08.34	+24.43
49	Xia Lina	China	1:06.31	2:10.55	+26.64
50	Jing Liu	China	1:06.26	2:10.90	+26.99
51	Tamara Gisem	Ukraine	1:05.11	2:11.03	+27.12
52	Rui Liu	China	1:07.68	2:12.99	+29.08
—	Chiara Costazza	Italy	55.16	DNF	—
—	Lucie Hrstková	Czech Republic	56.95	DNF	—
—	Nina Penzešová	Slovakia	57.24	DNF	—
—	Mireia Clemente	Spain	57.83	DNF	—
—	Yvonne Schnock	Croatia	1:07.99	DNF	—
—	Duygu Ulusoy	Turkey	1:03.11	DQ	—
—	Annemarie Gerg	Germany	DNF	—	—
—	Annalisa Ceresa	Italy	DNF	—	—
—	Susanne Riesch	Germany	DNF	—	—
—	Tina Maze	Slovenia	DNF	—	—
—	Aleksandra Kluś	Poland	DNF	—	—
—	Shona Rubens	Canada	DNF	—	—
—	Megan Ryley	Canada	DNF	—	—
—	Jelena Lolović	Serbia	DNF	—	—
—	Agnieszka Gąsienica-Daniel	Poland	DNF	—	—
—	Eva Hučková	Slovakia	DNF	—	—
—	Emilie Desforges	Canada	DNF	—	—
—	Marija Trmčić	Serbia	DNF	—	—
—	Kirsten McGarry	Ireland	DNF	—	—
—	María Belén Simari Birkner	Argentina	DNF	—	—
—	Maja Klepić	Bosnia and Herzegovina	DNF	—	—
—	Iveta Benhena	Latvia	DNF	—	—
—	Tiiu Nurmberg	Estonia	DNF	—	—
—	Liene Fimbauere	Latvia	DNF	—	—
—	Bianca-Andreea Narea	Romania	DNF	—	—
—	Ivana Ivcevska	Macedonia	DNF	—	—
—	Nathalie Diab	Lebanon	DNF	—	—
—	Lindsey Kildow	United States	DNS	—	—
—	Kathrin Hölzl	Germany	DNS	—	—
—	Mia Ighniades	Lebanon	DNS	—	—
—	Evija Benhena	Latvia	DQ	—	—
