= Alpine skiing at the 2006 Winter Olympics – Women's slalom =

Women's slalom at the XX Olympic Winter Games
- Pictogram for alpine skiing
- Venue: Sestriere
- Date: February 22, 2006
- Competitors: 64 from 49 nations
- Winning time: 1:29.04

Medalists
1st place, gold medalist(s)		Anja Pärson	Sweden
2nd place, silver medalist(s)		Nicole Hosp	Austria
3rd place, bronze medalist(s)		Marlies Schild	Austria

The women's slalom was contested on Wednesday, 22 February. Janica Kostelić led in the slalom World Cup with 460 points, and was also defending World and Olympic champion, but she finished 0.15 seconds behind Marlies Schild for the 4th place. Anja Pärson got her first Olympic gold medal.

== Results ==
Complete results for the Women's Slalom event at the 2006 Winter Olympics.

Rank	Name	Country	Run 1	Run 2	Time	Difference
1st place, gold medalist(s)	Anja Pärson	Sweden	42.38	46.66	1:29.04	
2nd place, silver medalist(s)	Nicole Hosp	Austria	42.83	46.50	1:29.33	+0.29
3rd place, bronze medalist(s)	Marlies Schild	Austria	43.09	46.70	1:29.79	+0.75
4	Janica Kostelić	Croatia	43.07	46.87	1:29.94	+0.90
5	Michaela Kirchgasser	Austria	42.97	47.31	1:30.28	+1.24
6	Tanja Poutiainen	Finland	43.05	47.74	1:30.79	+1.75
7	Annemarie Gerg	Germany	43.37	47.52	1:30.89	+1.85
8	Chiara Costazza	Italy	44.15	46.93	1:31.08	+2.04
8	Therese Borssén	Sweden	43.21	47.87	1:31.08	+2.04
10	Sarah Schleper	United States	43.61	47.77	1:31.38	+2.34
11	Florine de Leymarie	France	43.40	47.99	1:31.39	+2.35
12	Resi Stiegler	United States	44.15	47.33	1:31.48	+2.44
13	Šárka Záhrobská	Czech Republic	43.52	48.03	1:31.55	+2.51
14	Lindsey Kildow	United States	43.92	47.66	1:31.58	+2.54
15	Ana Jelušić	Croatia	43.42	48.36	1:31.78	+2.74
16	Monika Bergmann-Schmuderer	Germany	43.48	48.36	1:31.84	+2.80
17	Brigitte Acton	Canada	44.75	47.15	1:31.90	+2.86
18	Anna Ottosson	Sweden	44.09	47.99	1:32.08	+3.04
19	Manuela Mölgg	Italy	43.59	48.58	1:32.17	+3.13
20	Henna Raita	Finland	44.29	48.04	1:32.33	+3.29
21	Maria Pietilä-Holmner	Sweden	44.16	48.31	1:32.47	+3.43
22	Veronika Zuzulová	Slovakia	44.53	48.00	1:32.53	+3.49
23	Nika Fleiss	Croatia	44.31	48.30	1:32.61	+3.57
24	Annalisa Ceresa	Italy	44.55	48.22	1:32.77	+3.73
25	Ana Kobal	Slovenia	44.36	48.53	1:32.89	+3.85
26	Vanessa Vidal	France	44.49	48.48	1:32.97	+3.93
27	Mizue Hoshi	Japan	45.35	48.03	1:33.38	+4.34
28	Eva Kurfürstová	Czech Republic	45.03	48.44	1:33.47	+4.43
29	Noriyo Hiroi	Japan	44.74	48.85	1:33.59	+4.55
30	Katarzyna Karasińska	Poland	45.41	48.89	1:34.30	+5.26
31	Mojca Rataj	Bosnia and Herzegovina	45.34	49.03	1:34.37	+5.33
32	Jessica Walter	Liechtenstein	45.37	49.73	1:35.10	+6.06
33	Alexandra Coletti	Monaco	45.38	50.58	1:35.96	+6.92
34	Anne-Sophie Barthet	France	46.28	50.38	1:36.66	+7.62
35	Nicola Campbell	New Zealand	45.90	50.92	1:36.82	+7.78
36	Macarena Simari Birkner	Argentina	45.90	51.17	1:37.07	+8.03
37	María Belén Simari Birkner	Argentina	46.35	51.26	1:37.61	+8.57
38	Mami Sekizuka	Japan	47.22	50.50	1:37.72	+8.68
39	Chirine Njeim	Lebanon	47.24	51.90	1:39.14	+10.10
40	Erika McLeod	New Zealand	47.96	52.61	1:40.57	+11.53
41	Jae Eun Oh	South Korea	48.07	53.77	1:41.84	+12.80
42	Kirsten McGarry	Ireland	49.64	52.79	1:42.43	+13.39
43	Jelena Lolović	Serbia and Montenegro	46.44	56.36	1:42.80	+13.76
44	Tiiu Nurmberg	Estonia	48.77	54.21	1:42.98	+13.94
45	Yulia Siparenko	Ukraine	50.31	52.95	1:43.26	+14.22
46	Marija Trmčić	Serbia and Montenegro	49.47	53.99	1:43.46	+14.42
47	Vera Eremenko	Kazakhstan	50.73	55.27	1:46.00	+16.96
48	Ivana Ivcevska	Macedonia	52.40	57.73	1:50.13	+21.09
49	Réka Tuss	Hungary	53.76	57.83	1:51.59	+22.55
50	Jinzhi Dong	China	55.40	58.66	1:54.06	+25.02
51	Neha Ahuja	India	55.45	1:00.71	1:56.16	+27.12
	Kristina Koznick	United States	45.72	DNS		
	Lucie Hrstková	Czech Republic	46.45	DNF		
	Maria Kirkova	Bulgaria	46.58	DNF		
	Martina Ertl-Renz	Germany	DNF			
	Daniela Merighetti	Italy	DNF			
	Petra Zakouřilová	Czech Republic	DNF			
	Soňa Maculová	Slovakia	DNF			
	Matea Ferk	Croatia	DNF			
	Eva Hučková	Slovakia	DNF			
	Duygu Ulusoy	Turkey	DNF			
	Kathrin Zettel	Austria	DSQ			
	Laure Pequegnot	France	DSQ			
	Magdalini Kalomirou	Greece	DSQ			
