= Resi Stiegler =

American alpine skier

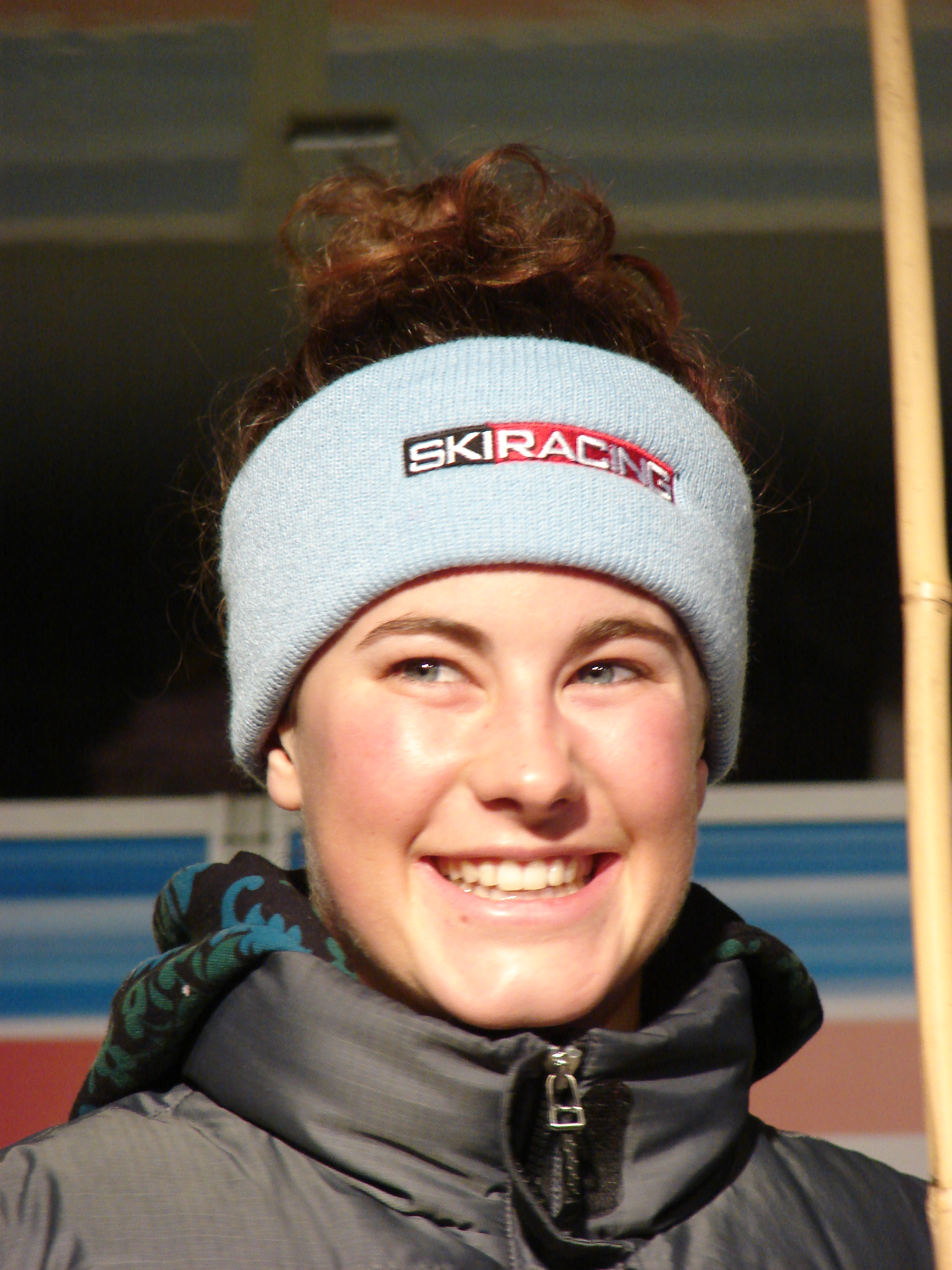
- Stiegler in December 2006

Personal information
- Born: November 14, 1985 (age 40) Jackson, Wyoming, U.S.
- Height: 5 ft 8 in (173 cm)
- Website: resi-stiegler.com

Skiing career
- Sport: Alpine skiing
- Club: Jackson Hole SSC
- Disciplines: Slalom, giant slalom, combined
- World Cup debut: December 22, 2002 (age 17)

Olympics
- Teams: 3 – (2006, 2014, 2018)
- Medals: 0

World Championships
- Teams: 8 – (2003–17)
- Medals: 0

World Cup
- Seasons: 13th – (2003–08, '11–17)
- Wins: 0
- Podiums: 1 – (1 SL)
- Overall titles: 0 – (25th in 2007)
- Discipline titles: 0 – (5th in K, 2007)
Medal record
Women's alpine skiing
Representing the United States
Junior World Championships
Silver medal – second place	2005 Bardonecchia	Combined
Bronze medal – third place	2003 Briançonnais	Slalom
Bronze medal – third place	2003 Briançonnais	Combined

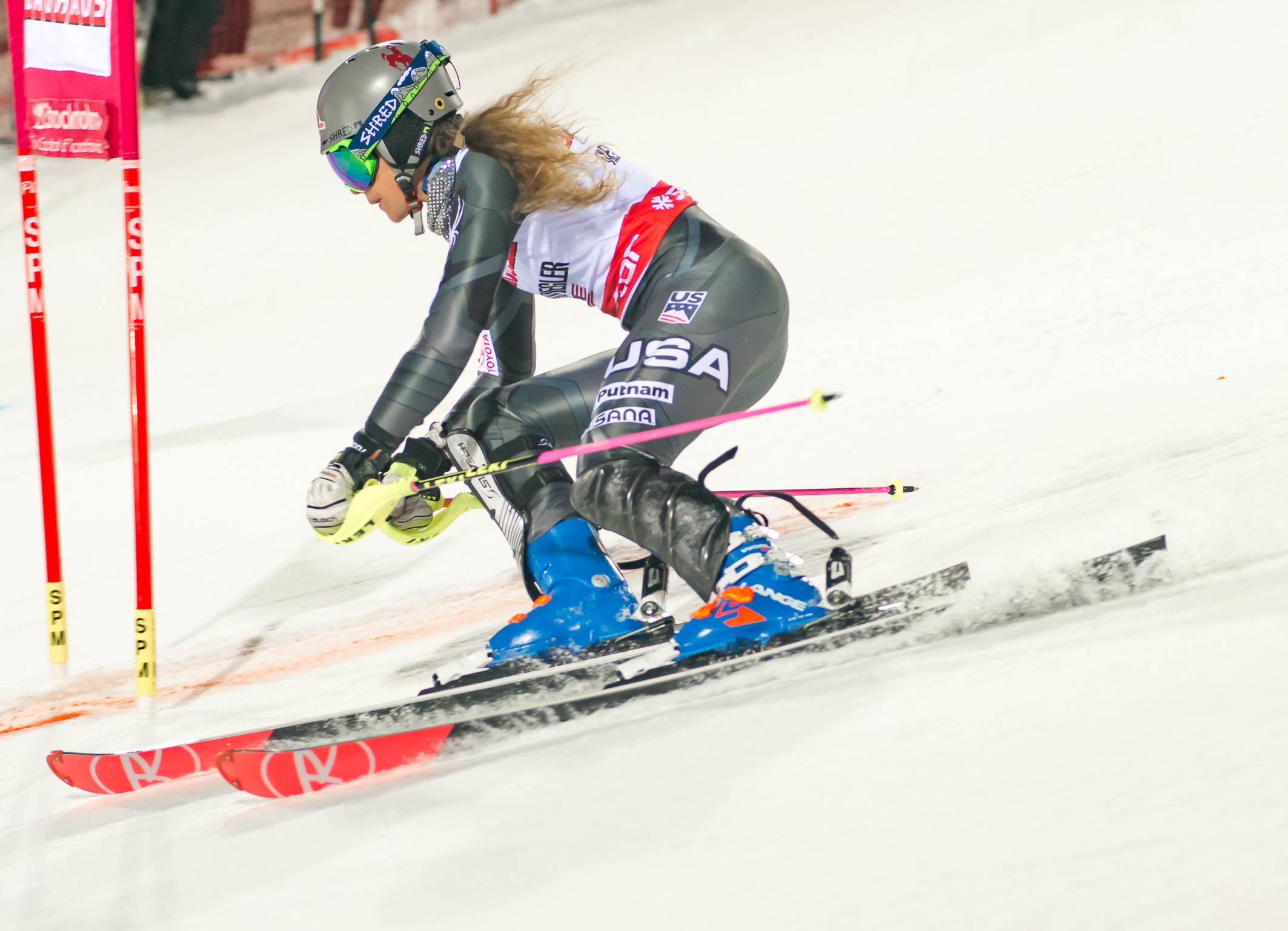
Resi Stiegler in Hammarbybacken World Cup 2018

Resi Stiegler (/reɪˈziː/ (born November 14, 1985) is a former World Cup alpine ski racer from the United States. She primarily raced in the technical events and specialized in slalom.

Born and raised in Jackson, Wyoming, Stiegler is the daughter of Olympic champion Josef "Pepi" Stiegler of Austria. She began skiing at age two and racing at six at Jackson Hole. Junior Olympic and Nor-Am success while still a teenager led to a berth on the U.S. Ski Team; she made her World Cup debut at age 17 in December 2002 at a slalom in Lenzerheide, Switzerland, where she finished a remarkable eleventh. At the 2003 Junior World Championships in France, she won bronze medals in slalom and combined, to which she added a tenth-place finish in combined at the "grown-up" World Championships that year in St. Moritz, Switzerland.

Through March 2016, Stiegler has 21 World Cup top-ten finishes, with one podium. She finished sixth in combined at the 2005 World Championships in Santa Caterina, Italy. Stiegler made her Olympic debut at the 2006 Torino games at age 20, placing eleventh in the combined and twelfth in the slalom.

Stiegler's trademark is the tiger ears she usually wears atop her helmet. She won a well-publicized battle with the International Olympic Committee, allowing her to compete with the ears at the Torino Olympics.

After a series of injuries, Stiegler made her first World Cup podium in March 2012, a runner-up finish at a slalom in Ofterschwang, Germany. It was her first top ten finish in over four years. In a November, 2012 interview, Stiegler had recovered on schedule and was set to compete in the 2012–13 season as planned.

== World Cup results ==
=== Season standings ===
Season	Age	Overall	Slalom	Giant slalom	Super-G	Downhill	Combined
2003	17	92	39	—	—	—	—
2004	18	23	—	—	—	—	—
2005	19	45	19	49	—	—	8
2006	20	42	15	51	—	—	24
2007	21	25	17	31	—	51	5
2008	22	40	18	26	—	48	—
2009	23						
2010	24						
2011	25	98	36	—	—	—	—
2012	26	57	23	38	—	—	—
2013	27	77	31	—	—	—	—
2014	28	80	29	—	—	—	—
2015	29	65	22	—	—	—	—
2016	30	48	13	—	—	—	—
2017	31	61	20	56	—	—	—
2018	32	65	23	—	—	—	—

- Standings through 4 February 2018

=== Top tens ===
- 1 podium – (1 SL)
- 23 top tens – (1 GS, 17 SL, 2 PS, 3 SC)

Season	Date	Location	Discipline	Place
2004	8 Feb 2004	Zwiesel, Germany	Slalom	8th
2005	29 Dec 2004	Semmering, Austria	Slalom	8th
2005	20 Jan 2005	Zagreb, Croatia	Slalom	10th
2005	27 Feb 2005	San Sicario, Italy	Super combined	8th
2006	5 Jan 2006	Zagreb, Croatia	Slalom	10th
2006	10 Mar 2006	Levi, Finland	Slalom	9th
2006	17 Mar 2006	Åre, Sweden	Slalom	4th
2007	11 Nov 2006	Levi, Finland	Slalom	10th
2007	21 Dec 2006	Val-d'Isère, France	Slalom	6th
2007	4 Jan 2007	Zagreb, Croatia	Slalom	5th
2007	14 Jan 2007	Altenmarkt, Austria	Super Combined	4th
2007	24 Feb 2007	Sierra Nevada, Spain	Giant slalom	10th
2007	2 Mar 2007	Tarvisio, Italy	Super Combined	5th
2008	10 Nov 2007	Reiteralm, Austria	Slalom	4th
2008	25 Nov 2007	Panorama, Canada	Slalom	9th
2008	9 Dec 2007	Aspen, USA	Slalom	8th
2012	4 Mar 2012	Ofterschwang, Germany	Slalom	2nd
2013	4 Jan 2013	Zagreb, Croatia	Slalom	9th
2016	29 Nov 2015	Aspen, USA	Slalom	10th
2016	15 Feb 2016	Crans-Montana, Switzerland	Slalom	8th
2016	23 Feb 2016	Stockholm, Sweden	Parallel slalom	9th
2017	3 Jan 2017	Zagreb, Croatia	Slalom	7th
2017	31 Jan 2017	Stockholm, Sweden	Parallel slalom	9th

== World Championship results ==
Year	Age	Slalom	Giant slalom	Super-G	Downhill	Combined
2003	17	19	—	—	—	10
2005	19	6	—	—	—	21
2007	21	8	—	—	—	DNF2
2009	23	19	—	—	—	—
2011	25	19	—	—	—	—
2013	27	22	—	—	—	—
2015	29	DNS2	—	—	—	—
2017	31	11	DNF1	—	—	—

== Olympic results ==
Year	Age	Slalom	Giant slalom	Super-G	Downhill	Combined
2006	20	12	—	—	—	11
2010	24					
2014	28	DNF2	29	—	—	—
2018	32	DNF1	36	—	—	—

== Video ==
- You Tube – Jackson Hole Dreams – Resi Stiegler
