= Maria Pietilä Holmner =

Swedish alpine skier

Maria Pietilä-Holmner
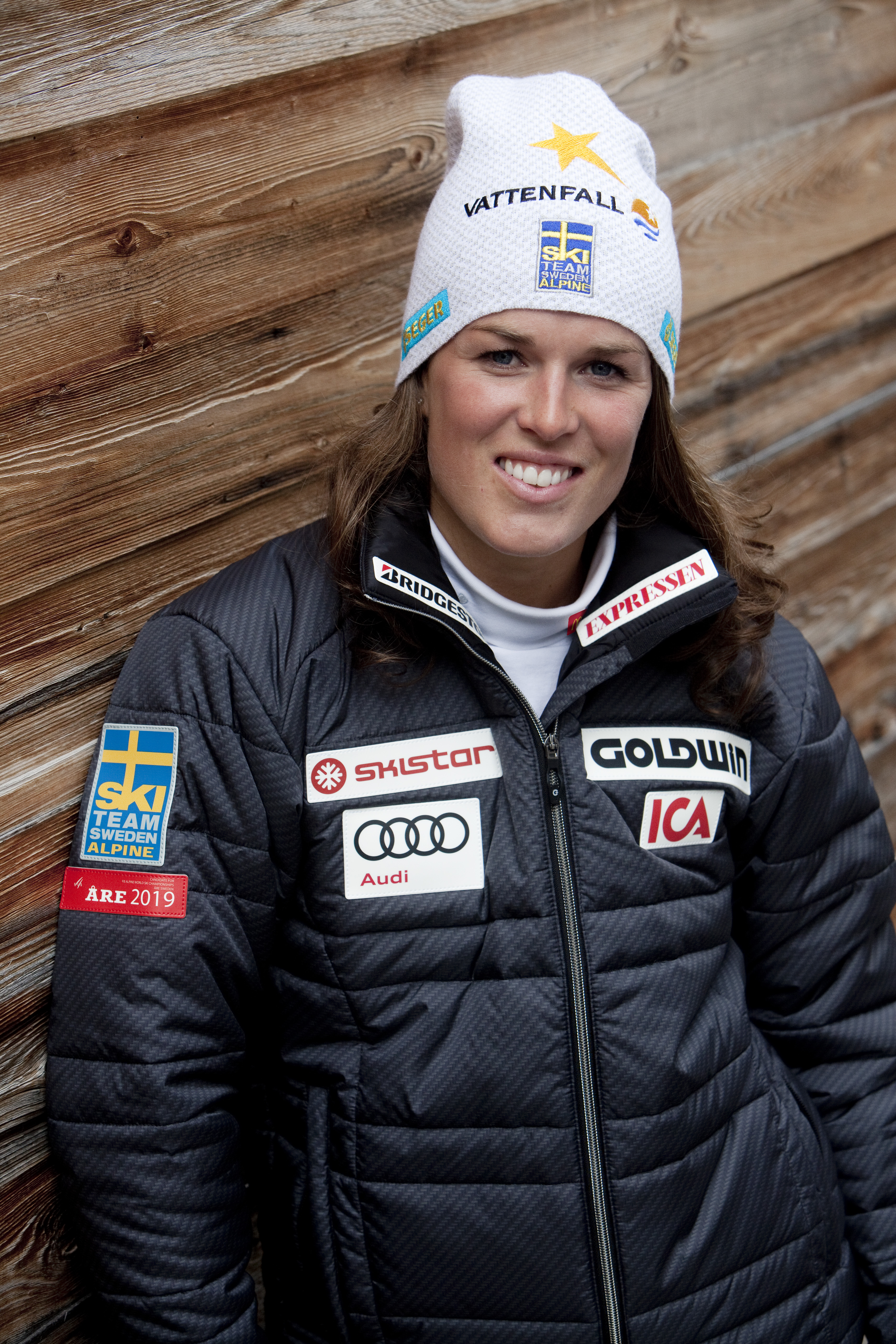
- Maria Pietilä-Holmner in Sälen in April 2014

Personal information
- Born: 25 July 1986 (age 39) Umeå, Sweden
- Height: 1.70 m (5 ft 7 in)
- Website: mariapietilaholmner

Skiing career
- Sport: Alpine skiing
- Club: Uhsk Umeå SK
- Retired: 17 January 2018 (age 31)
- Disciplines: Slalom, giant slalom
- World Cup debut: 26 October 2002 (age 16)

Olympics
- Teams: 3 – (2006, 2010, 2014)
- Medals: 0

World Championships
- Teams: 6 – (2005–2017)
- Medals: 2 (0 gold)

World Cup
- Seasons: 13 – (2005–2017)
- Wins: 3 – (2 SL, 1 CE)
- Podiums: 10 – (7 SL, 1 GS, 2 CE)
- Overall titles: 0 – (7th in 2014)
- Discipline titles: 0 – (3rd in GS, 2014)
Medal record
World Championships
Silver medal – second place	2007 Åre	Giant slalom
Silver medal – second place	2013 Schladming	Team event
Bronze medal – third place	2011 Garmisch	Slalom
Bronze medal – third place	2011 Garmisch	Team event
Bronze medal – third place	2015 Beaver Creek	Team event
Bronze medal – third place	2017 St. Moritz	Team event
Junior World Ski Championships
Gold medal – first place	2006 Mont-Sainte-Anne	Slalom

Maria Helena Pietilä-Holmner (born 25 July 1986) is a retired Swedish World Cup alpine ski racer. She specialised in the technical events of slalom and giant slalom.

Born in Umeå, Pietilä-Holmner took up alpine skiing at the age of seven. She was also a keen footballer, playing as a forward for Mariehem's girls' teams until the age of 15, when she decided to focus on skiing. Pietilä-Holmner made her World Cup debut in Sölden at age 16 in October 2002. She won a gold medal at the 2006 World Junior Alpine Skiing Championships in the slalom. Her first World Cup win came at a slalom in Aspen in November 2010. She made a total of 207 World Cup starts, and took ten podiums, including three wins.

Pietilä-Holmner took five medals in the World Championships, two as an individual and three in the team events. She was the silver medalist in giant slalom in 2007 at Åre, Sweden. Four years later in 2011, she won 2 bronze medals at Garmish-Partenkirchen in the slalom and the team event. At Schladming in 2013, she won a silver in the team event. She took her final Worlds medal at the 2017 Championships, where she was part of the Swedish squad which finished third in the team event.

She made her debut at the Winter Olympics in 2006, where she finished tenth in the giant slalom. At the 2010 Winter Games, she finished fourth in the slalom, and at the 2014 Winter Olympics she was sixth in the giant slalom. She also won seven Swedish championship titles: five in slalom, one in giant slalom and one in combined.

On 17 January 2018, she announced her retirement from alpine skiing, following back problems. to instead become a Eurosport expert commentator.

She has been in a relationship with fellow alpine skier Hans Olsson since 2004: as of 2018 the couple were engaged. They both worked as part of the team covering alpine skiing at the 2018 Winter Olympics for Eurosport.

== World Cup results ==
=== Season standings ===
Season	Age	Overall	Slalom	Giant slalom	Super-G	Downhill	Combined
2004	17	104	—	43	—	—	—
2005	18	63	33	31	—	—	—
2006	19	24	17	20	—	—	—
2007	20	26	15	14	—	—	—
2008	21	29	12	12	—	—	—
2009	22	13	7	7	54	—	—
2010	23	13	8	6	—	—	—
2011	24	11	4	19	—	—	32
2012	25	33	14	29	—	—	—
2013	26	17	7	27	—	—	—
2014	27	7	4	3	—	—	—
2015	28	15	7	16	—	—	—
2016	29	19	9	8	—	—	—
2017	30	65	23	33	—	—	—
2018	31	did not compete; retired in the middle of season					

=== Race podiums ===
- 3 wins – (2 SL, 1 CE)
- 10 podiums – (7 SL, 1 GS, 2 PSL)

Season	Date	Location	Discipline	Place
2009	15 November 2008	Levi, Finland	Slalom	2nd
2011	28 November 2010	(United States) Aspen, USA	Slalom	1st
2011	2 January 2011	Munich, Germany	City event	1st
2012	27 November 2011	(United States) Aspen, USA	Slalom	2nd
2014	22 December 2013	Val-d'Isère, France	Giant slalom	3rd
2014	5 January 2014	Bormio, Italy	Slalom	2nd
2014	14 January 2014	Flachau, Austria	Slalom	3rd
2014	8 March 2014	Åre, Sweden	Slalom	2nd
2015	13 December 2014	Åre, Sweden	Slalom	1st
2016	23 February 2016	Stockholm, Sweden	City event	3rd

== World Championship results ==
Year	Age	Slalom	Giant slalom	Super-G	Downhill	Combined
2005	18	13	16	—	—	—
2007	20	11	2	—	—	—
2009	22	DNF1	8	—	—	—
2011	24	3	22	—	—	—
2013	26	6	18	—	—	—
2015	28	14	9	—	—	—
2017	30	14	25	—	—	—

== Olympic results ==
Year	Age	Slalom	Giant slalom	Super-G	Downhill	Combined
2006	19	21	10	—	—	—
2010	23	4	24	—	—	—
2014	27	DNF1	6	—	—	—

== Video ==
- Zapiks – post-race interview in November 2011 – 2nd place, Aspen slalom
