= Marlies Schild =

Austrian alpine skier

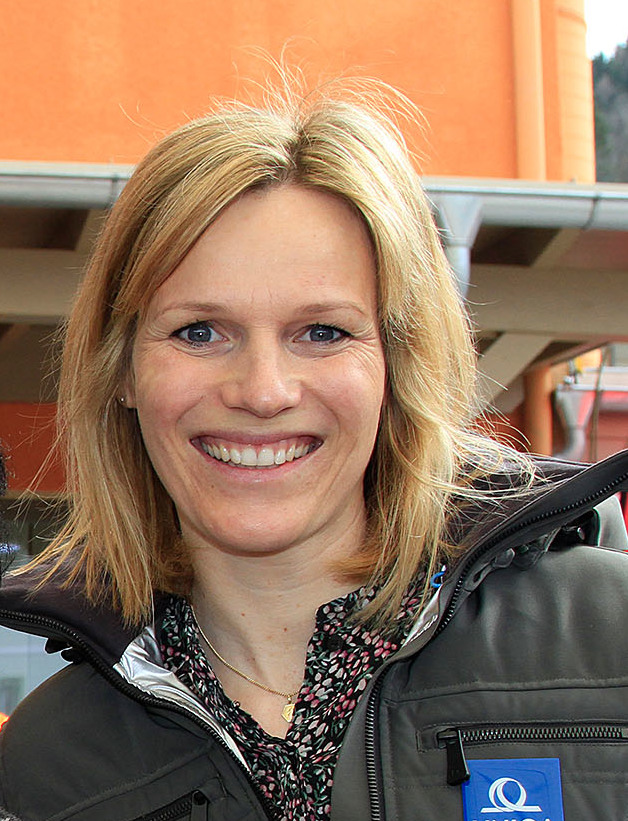
- Schild in March 2017

Personal information
- Born: 31 May 1981 (age 45) Admont, Liezen, Styria, Austria
- Height: 1.72 m (5 ft 8 in)
- Website: marlies-schild.com

Skiing career
- Sport: Alpine skiing
- Club: Skiklub Dienten
- Retired: September 2018 (age 33)
- Disciplines: Slalom, giant slalom
- World Cup debut: 19 December 2001 (age 20)

Olympics
- Teams: 4 – (2602–14)
- Medals: 3 (0 gold)

World Championships
- Teams: 5 – (2003–07, 2011–13)
- Medals: 7 (2 gold)

World Cup
- Seasons: 12 – (2002–2008, 2010–2014)
- Wins: 37 – (35 SL, 1 SC, 1 GS)
- Podiums: 68 – (56 SL, 5 SC, 3 GS, 2 SG, 2 DH)
- Overall titles: 0 – (2nd in 2007)
- Discipline titles: 5 – (4 SL, 1 K)
Medal record
Women's alpine skiing
Representing Austria
International alpine ski competitions
Event	1st	2nd	3rd
Olympic Games	0	3	1
World Championships	2	3	2
Total	2	6	3
World Cup race podiums
Event	1st	2nd	3rd
Slalom	35	9	12
Giant slalom	1	0	2
Super-G	0	1	1
Downhill	0	2	0
Combined	1	1	3
Total	37	13	18
Olympic Games
Silver medal – second place	2006 Turin	Combined
Silver medal – second place	2010 Vancouver	Slalom
Silver medal – second place	2014 Sochi	Slalom
Bronze medal – third place	2006 Turin	Slalom
World Championships
Gold medal – first place	2007 Åre	Team event
Gold medal – first place	2011 Garmisch	Slalom
Silver medal – second place	2003 St. Moritz	Slalom
Silver medal – second place	2007 Åre	Slalom
Silver medal – second place	2011 Garmisch	Team event
Bronze medal – third place	2005 Bormio	Combined
Bronze medal – third place	2007 Åre	Combined

Marlies Raich (née Schild; born 31 May 1981) is a retired Austrian World Cup alpine ski racer. She specializes in the technical disciplines of slalom and giant slalom. Schild won four Olympic medals, with silvers in the combined (2006) and slalom (2010, 2014) and a bronze in slalom (2006). She has seven World Championship medals and has won five World Cup season titles.

Schild completed her World Cup career with 37 wins, all but two in slalom. She retired from international competition at age 33 in September 2014.

== Ski racing career ==
Born in Admont, Styria, Schild initially preferred the downhill event. However, by the age of 19 she had already undergone five knee surgeries, prompting her to concentrate on the less dangerous slalom and giant slalom competitions. Since 2004, she has finished every season (except 2009 when out with injury) among the top 3 in the World Cup slalom standings, and won the slalom trophy in 2007, 2008 and 2011. Her best result in the overall competition was a second place in 2007, when she lost the overall trophy only in the last two races (slalom and giant slalom) against compatriot Nicole Hosp, after having taken the lead with a second place in downhill and a third place in super-G on the first two days of the World Cup final 2007 in Lenzerheide.

While training for the giant slalom in October 2008, Schild fell and sustained a comminuted fracture in her left tibia and fibula, as well as a fractured tibial head. This severe injury sidelined Schild for the entire 2009 season. A few weeks after her return to competition in Levi in November 2009, she celebrated her first victory after the injury, winning the slalom in Lienz on 29 December. Starting with this win, Schild reached the podium in all FIS slalom races she finished for over two years, including the 2010 Olympics in Vancouver (silver medal) and the 2011 World Championships in Garmisch-Partenkirchen (gold medal). Her podium-run ended on 10 March 2012, when she finished 6th at the slalom at Åre. Schild has not competed in downhill or super-G since her injury. (Ref. Bio Patrick Lang)

After Schild tore ligaments in her right knee on 20 December 2012 in Sweden, it was announced that she would miss most of the 2013 season, including the 2013 World Championships in Schladming. On 13 February, Schild announced her plans to compete in the slalom three days later, only 58 days after the injury. She managed a top ten result with a ninth-place finish.

With 35 World Cup victories in slalom, Schild lead the career list in that discipline until Mikaela Shiffrin surpassed her on 29 December 2018. She has at least two World Cup podiums in each of the five alpine disciplines, with over fifty in slalom.

=== World championships ===
At the 2003 World Championships in St. Moritz, Switzerland, she placed second in the slalom behind Janica Kostelić, and in 2005 at Bormio, Italy, she won a bronze medal in the combined, behind Janica Kostelić and Anja Pärson. In 2007 at Åre, Sweden, Schild won silver in the slalom and bronze in the combined. In team events she won gold 2007 in Åre and silver in 2011 at Garmisch-Partenkirchen, Germany.

=== Olympics ===
At the 2006 Winter Olympic Games in Turin, Schild won a silver medal in combined and a bronze medal in the slalom; in the giant slalom, she placed 17th. In 2010 in Vancouver, Schild improved to another silver in the slalom at Whistler and she repeated this in 2014 in the slalom at Sochi. She also competed in 2002 in Salt Lake, but did not finish the slalom at Deer Valley.

== Personal ==
Schild is married to Austrian ski racer Benjamin Raich. Her sister Bernadette (b. 1990) is also a World Cup racer; they made the same podium twice during the 2014 season, at Courchevel in December and Kranjska Gora in February.

== World Cup results ==
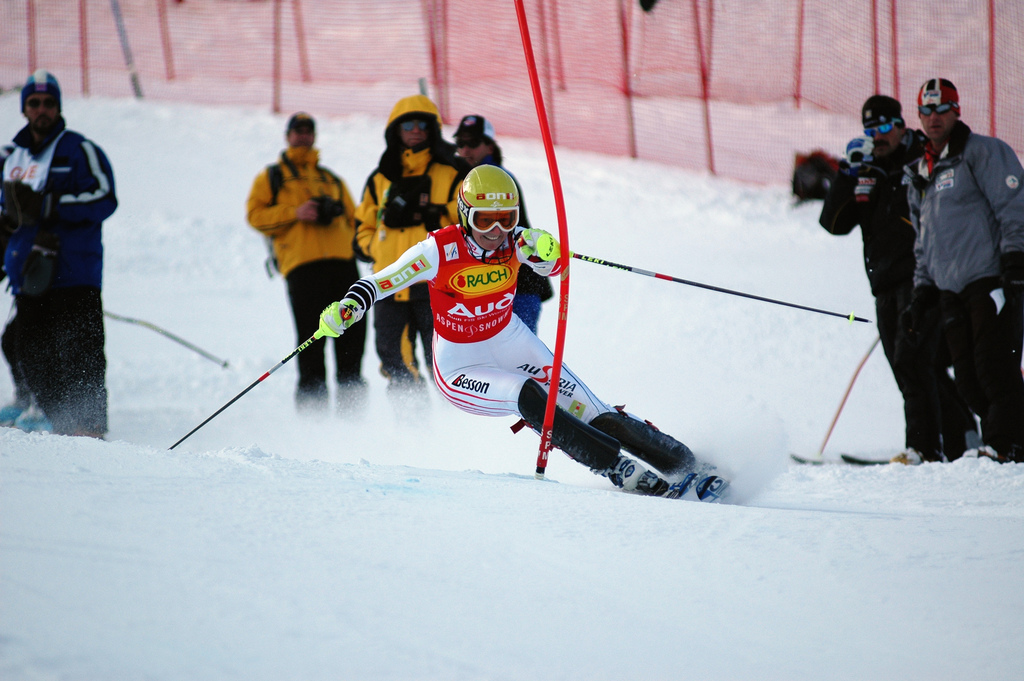
Winning at Aspen in November 2006

=== Season titles ===
- 5 titles – (4 slalom, 1 combined)

Season	Event
2007	Slalom
2007	Combined
2008	Slalom
2011	Slalom
2012	Slalom

=== Season standings ===
Season	Age	Overall	Slalom	Giant slalom	Super-G	Downhill	Combined
2002	20	53	16	—	—	—	—
2003	21	19	5	—	—	—	—
2004	22	14	2	49	—	—	—
2005	23	8	3	15	25	30	9
2006	24	6	2	17	17	40	4
2007	25	2	1	12	14	12	1
2008	26	5	1	11	25	15	5
2009	27	injured in October 2008, missed entire season					
2010	28	15	3	—	—	—	—
2011	29	6	1	17	—	—	—
2012	30	8	1	15	—	—	—
2013	31	57	26	32	—	—	—
2014	32	17	3	—	—	—	—

=== Race victories ===
- 37 wins – (1 giant slalom, 35 slalom, 1 combined)

Season	Date	Location	Discipline
2004	13 Mar 2004	Sestriere, Italy	Slalom
2005	28 Dec 2004	Semmering, Austria	Giant slalom
2005	29 Dec 2004	Semmering, Austria	Slalom
2005	9 Jan 2005	Santa Caterina, Italy	Slalom
2006	29 Dec 2005	Lienz, Austria	Slalom
2006	5 Jan 2006	Zagreb, Croatia	Slalom
2006	8 Jan 2006	Maribor, Slovenia	Slalom
2007	11 Nov 2006	Levi, Finland	Slalom
2007	26 Nov 2006	Aspen, USA	Slalom
2007	15 Dec 2006	Reiteralm, Austria	Super combined
2007	21 Dec 2006	Val d'Isère, France	Slalom
2007	4 Jan 2007	Zagreb, Croatia	Slalom
2007	7 Jan 2007	Kranjska Gora, Slovenia	Slalom
2007	25 Feb 2007	Sierra Nevada, Spain	Slalom
2007	11 Mar 2007	Zwiesel, Germany	Slalom
2008	10 Nov 2007	Reiteralm, Austria	Slalom
2008	25 Nov 2007	Panorama, Canada	Slalom
2008	6 Jan 2008	Špindlerův Mlýn, Czech Rep.	Slalom
2008	27 Jan 2008	Ofterschwang, Germany	Slalom
2008	14 Mar 2008	Bormio, Italy	Slalom
2010	29 Dec 2009	Lienz, Austria	Slalom
2010	12 Jan 2010	Flachau, Austria	Slalom
2010	13 Mar 2010	Garmisch, Germany	Slalom
2011	13 Nov 2010	Levi, Finland	Slalom
2011	21 Dec 2010	Courchevel, France	Slalom
2011	29 Dec 2010	Semmering, Austria	Slalom
2011	4 Jan 2011	Zagreb, Croatia	Slalom
2011	4 Feb 2011	Zwiesel, Germany	Slalom
2011	12 Mar 2011	Špindlerův Mlýn, Czech Rep.	Slalom
2012	27 Nov 2011	Aspen, USA	Slalom
2012	18 Dec 2011	Courchevel, France	Slalom
2012	20 Dec 2011	Flachau, Austria	Slalom
2012	29 Dec 2011	Lienz, Austria	Slalom
2012	3 Jan 2012	Zagreb, Croatia	Slalom
2012	11 Feb 2012	Soldeu, Andorra	Slalom
2014	17 Dec 2013	Courchevel, France	Slalom
2014	29 Dec 2013	Lienz, Austria	Slalom

== World Championship results ==
Year	Age	Slalom	Giant slalom	Super-G	Downhill	Combined
2003	21	2	–	–	–	4
2005	23	DSQ1	14	–	–	3
2007	25	2	DNF1	—	—	3
2009	27	injured, did not compete				
2011	29	1	8	—	—	—
2013	31	9	—	—	—	—

== Olympic results ==
Year	Age	Slalom	Giant slalom	Super-G	Downhill	Combined
2002	20	DNF1	—	—	—	—
2006	24	3	17	—	—	2
2010	28	2	—	—	—	—
2014	32	2	—	—	—	—

Awards
Preceded by Elisabeth Görgl	Austrian Sportswoman of the year 2012	Succeeded by Anna Fenninger
