= Alpine skiing at the 2006 Winter Olympics – Women's combined =

Women's combined at the XX Olympic Winter Games
- Pictogram for alpine skiing
- Venue: San Sicario
- Date: February 17–18, 2006
- Competitors: 45 from 20 nations
- Winning time: 2:51.08

Medalists
1st place, gold medalist(s)		Janica Kostelić	Croatia
2nd place, silver medalist(s)		Marlies Schild	Austria
3rd place, bronze medalist(s)		Anja Pärson	Sweden

Originally scheduled to run on 17 February, the downhill portion of the Women's combined was postponed due to high winds. The slalom was held on 17 February and the downhill portion was on Saturday, 18 February. Janica Kostelić was both defending World and Olympic champion, and she led the aggregate World Cup standings. Janica also won the only combined race leading into the championships in St. Moritz, Switzerland and she also won all combined races held in World Cup since the last Olympic games.

== Results ==
The results of the women's combined event in Alpine skiing at the 2006 Winter Olympics.

Rank	Name	Country	Slalom 1	Slalom 2	Downhill	Time	Difference
1st place, gold medalist(s)	Janica Kostelić	Croatia	38.65	43.03	1:29.40	2:51.08	+0.00
2nd place, silver medalist(s)	Marlies Schild	Austria	38.39	42.83	1:30.36	2:51.58	+0.50
3rd place, bronze medalist(s)	Anja Pärson	Sweden	38.75	43.31	1:29.57	2:51.63	+0.55
4	Kathrin Zettel	Austria	38.77	42.98	1:30.66	2:52.41	+1.33
5	Nicole Hosp	Austria	38.75	43.32	1:31.14	2:53.21	+2.13
6	Michaela Kirchgasser	Austria	38.99	43.47	1:31.02	2:53.48	+2.40
7	Martina Ertl-Renz	Germany	39.28	43.92	1:31.08	2:54.28	+3.20
8	Jessica Lindell-Vikarby	Sweden	40.04	44.96	1:30.19	2:55.19	+4.11
9	Julia Mancuso	United States	39.79	44.81	1:30.84	2:55.44	+4.36
10	Brigitte Acton	Canada	40.18	44.59	1:30.98	2:55.75	+4.67
11	Resi Stiegler	United States	39.08	44.36	1:32.35	2:55.79	+4.71
12	Janette Hargin	Sweden	40.06	44.78	1:31.29	2:56.13	+5.05
13	Emily Brydon	Canada	40.94	45.65	1:29.92	2:56.51	+5.43
14	Nike Bent	Sweden	40.66	45.83	1:30.13	2:56.62	+5.54
15	Veronika Zuzulová	Slovakia	39.68	43.67	1:33.28	2:56.63	+5.55
16	Monika Bergmann-Schmuderer	Germany	40.37	43.89	1:32.54	2:56.80	+5.72
17	Kaylin Richardson	United States	40.45	44.55	1:31.83	2:56.83	+5.75
18	Marie Marchand-Arvier	France	41.04	44.62	1:31.45	2:57.11	+6.03
19	Šárka Záhrobská	Czech Republic	40.26	44.50	1:32.38	2:57.14	+6.06
20	Nadia Fanchini	Italy	40.90	46.21	1:30.04	2:57.15	+6.07
21	Petra Robnik	Slovenia	40.54	44.84	1:32.02	2:57.40	+6.32
22	Lucie Hrstková	Czech Republic	40.96	46.19	1:32.42	2:59.57	+8.49
23	Soňa Maculová	Slovakia	40.53	45.63	1:34.09	3:00.25	+9.17
24	Petra Zakouřilová	Czech Republic	40.46	45.72	1:34.59	3:00.77	+9.69
25	Carolina Ruiz Castillo	Spain	41.74	46.47	1:32.72	3:00.93	+9.85
26	Macarena Simari Birkner	Argentina	40.99	45.95	1:35.72	3:02.66	+11.58
27	Wendy Siorpaes	Italy	42.66	48.48	1:31.71	3:02.85	+11.77
28	Dagný L. Kristjánsdóttir	Iceland	44.23	48.37	1:31.65	3:04.25	+13.17
29	María Belén Simari Birkner	Argentina	41.55	47.08	1:36.72	3:05.35	+14.27
30	Noelle Barahona	Chile	47.62	56.39	1:42.61	3:26.62	+35.54
	Fränzi Aufdenblatten	Switzerland	41.22	47.23	DNS		
	Nika Fleiss	Croatia	40.29	45.00	DNS		
	Lindsey Kildow	United States	39.86	DNF			
	Urška Rabič	Slovenia	40.61	DNF			
	Daniela Merighetti	Italy	41.41	DSQ			
	Andrea Casasnovas	Spain	DNS				
	Miriam Vázquez	Argentina	DNS				
	Anne-Sophie Barthet	France	DNF				
	Jelena Lolović	Serbia and Montenegro	DNF				
	Shona Rubens	Canada	DNF				
	Eva Hučková	Slovakia	DNF				
	Jana Gantnerová	Slovakia	DNF				
	Alexandra Coletti	Monaco	DNF				
	Chirine Njeim	Lebanon	DNF				
	Chemmy Alcott	Great Britain	DSQ				
