= Sekizuka =

Sekizuka (written: 関塚) is a Japanese surname. Notable people with the surname include:

- Mami Sekizuka (関塚 真美, born 1985), Japanese alpine skier
- Takashi Sekizuka (関塚 隆, born 1960), Japanese footballer and manager
