= FIS Alpine World Ski Championships 2007 – Women's super combined =

Event: Super Combined Women

Date: February 9, 2007

Place: Åre, Sweden

Downhill Start Time: 12:30 CET

Slalom Start Time: 16:00 CET

== Results ==
Rank	Athlete	Nation	Downhill	Total	Behind
1	Anja Pärson	Sweden	1:11.00	1:57.69	0
2	Julia Mancuso	United States	1:11.95	1:58.50	+0.81
3	Marlies Schild	Austria	1:12.91	1:58.54	+0.85
4	Šárka Záhrobská	Czech Republic	1:12.95	1:58.74	+1.05
5	Kathrin Zettel	Austria	1:13.23	1:59.60	+1.91
6	Nicole Hosp	Austria	1:12.22	1:59.91	+2.22
7	Maria Riesch	Germany	1:12.35	2:00.02	+2.33
8	Nike Bent	Sweden	1:11.97	2:00.15	+2.46
9	Veronika Zuzulová	Slovakia	1:14.44	2:00.74	+3.05
10	Emily Brydon	Canada	1:13.68	2:00.86	+3.17
11	Petra Robnik	Slovenia	1:13.56	2:00.89	+3.20
12	Kaylin Richardson	United States	1:13.15	2:00.94	+3.25
13	Rabea Grand	Switzerland	1:13.78	2:00.96	+3.27
14	Ingrid Jacquemod	France	1:12.33	2:01.00	+3.31
15	Daniela Merighetti	Italy	1:13.31	2:01.01	+3.32
16	Janette Hargin	Sweden	1:13.33	2:01.08	+3.39
17	Johanna Schnarf	Italy	1:13.22	2:01.23	+3.54
18	Britt Janyk	Canada	1:12.83	2:01.30	+3.61
19	Jessica Lindell-Vikarby	Sweden	1:13.48	2:01.65	+3.96
20	Urška Rabič	Slovenia	1:13.40	2:01.94	+4.25
21	Fanny Chmelar	Germany	1:14.19	2:02.06	+4.37
22	Anne-Sophie Barthet	France	1:13.97	2:02.73	+5.04
23	Sandrine Aubert	France	1:15.18	2:02.90	+5.21
24	Catherine Borghi	Switzerland	1:13.51	2:03.41	+5.72
25	Lucie Hrstková	Czech Republic	1:14.84	2:04.29	+6.60
26	Tamara Wolf	Switzerland	1:13.42	2:06.37	+8.68
27	María Belén Simari Birkner	Argentina	1:17.97	2:08.32	+10.63
28	Soňa Maculová	Slovakia	1:19.25	2:11.23	+13.54
—	Dominique Gisin	Switzerland	1:12.60	DNF	—
—	Tina Maze	Slovenia	1:13.10	DNF	—
—	Chemmy Alcott	United Kingdom	1:13.12	DNF	—
—	Marie Marchand-Arvier	France	1:13.19	DNF	—
—	Resi Stiegler	United States	1:13.31	DNF	—
—	Shona Rubens	Canada	1:13.32	DNF	—
—	Gina Stechert	Germany	1:13.89	DNF	—
—	Brigitte Acton	Canada	1:14.59	DNF	—
—	Eva Hučková	Slovakia	1:18.07	DNF	—
—	Carolina Ruiz Castillo	Spain	1:13.78	DNS	—
—	Elena Fanchini	Italy	1:14.66	DNS	—
—	Tina Weirather	Liechtenstein	1:14.70	DNS	—
—	Lindsey Kildow	United States	1:11.86	DQ	—
—	Nadia Fanchini	Italy	1:13.38	DQ	—
—	Michaela Kirchgasser	Austria	1:13.96	DQ	—
—	Dagný L. Kristjánsdóttir	Iceland	1:14.64	DQ	—
—	Petra Haltmayr	Germany	DNS	—	—
