= Bernadette Schild =

Austrian alpine skier (born 1990)

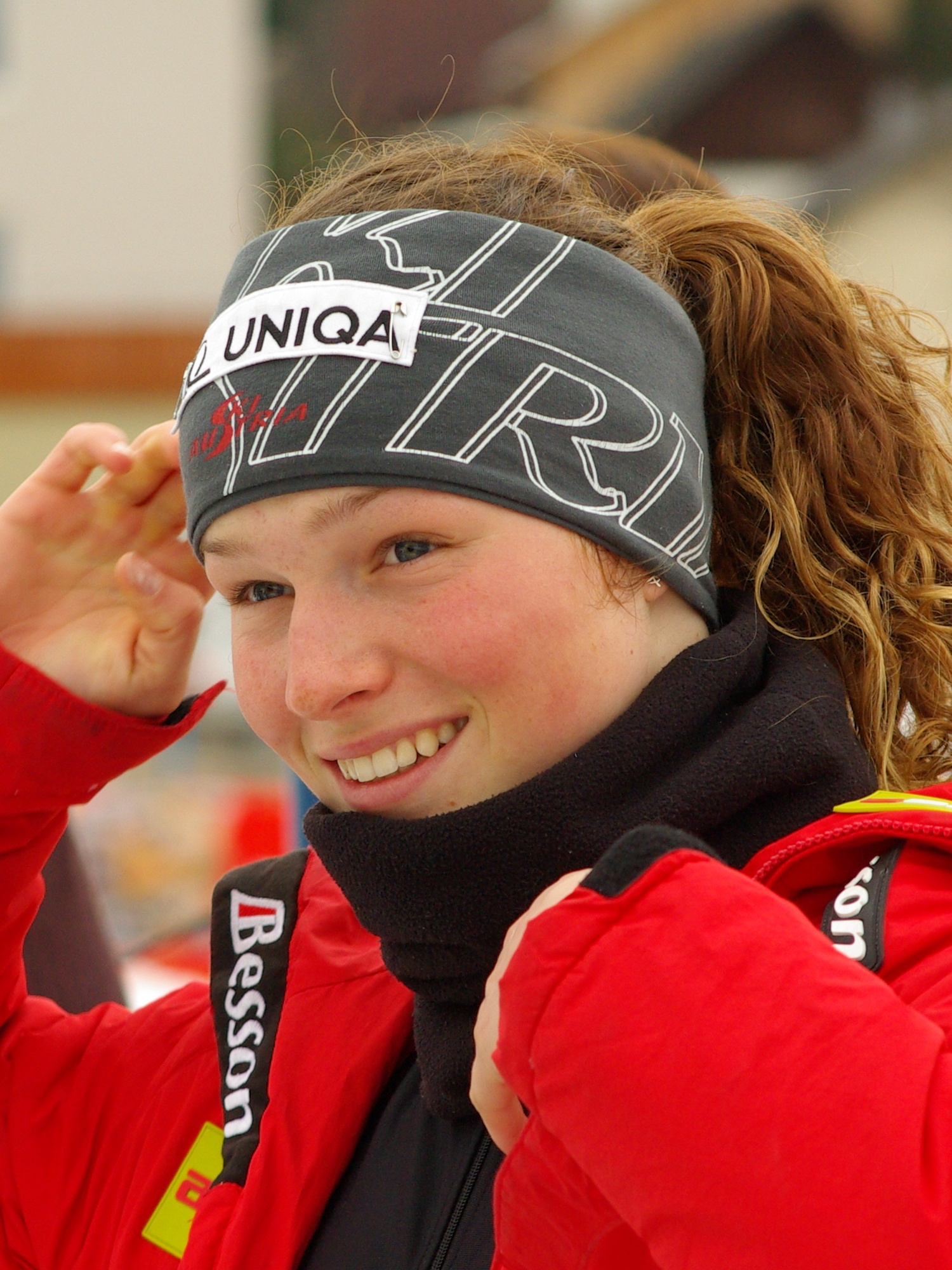
- Schild in March 2008

Personal information
- Born: 2 January 1990 (age 36) Zell am See, Salzburg, Austria
- Height: 1.65 m (5 ft 5 in)
- Website: bernadetteschild.com

Skiing career
- Sport: Alpine skiing
- Club: Skiklub Doienten
- Retired: 14 March 2021 (age 31)
- Disciplines: Slalom
- World Cup debut: 14 March 2008 (age 18)

Olympics
- Teams: 2 – (2014, 2018)
- Medals: 0

World Championships
- Teams: 3 – (2013, 2017, 2019)
- Medals: 0

World Cup
- Seasons: 14 – (2008–2021)
- Wins: 0
- Podiums: 7 – (7 SL)
- Overall titles: 0 – (14th in 2018)
- Discipline titles: 0 – (5th in SL, 2018)
Medal record
Women's alpine skiing
Representing Austria
Junior World Championships
Gold medal – first place	2008 Formigal	Slalom
Silver medal – second place	2009 Garmisch-Partenkirchen	Slalom

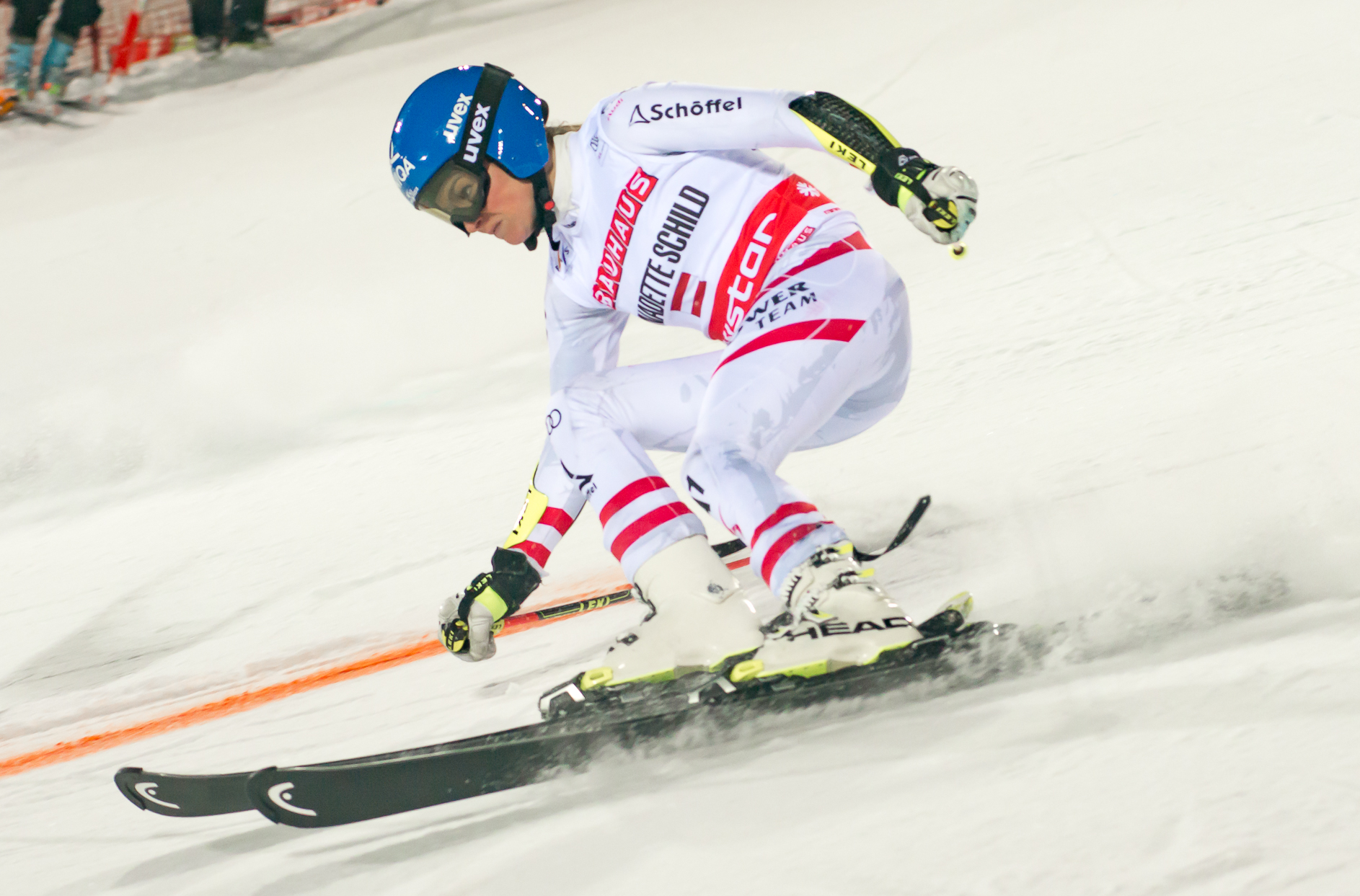
Schild at Stockholm's Hammarbybacken in 2018

Bernadette Schild (born 2 January 1990) is a retired World Cup alpine ski racer from Austria.

Born in Zell am See, Salzburg, Schild specialised in slalom and made her World Cup debut in March 2008 at Bormio. She attained her first World Cup podium in March 2013, a second place in slalom at Lenzerheide. Her second podium came nine months later, a third-place finish at Courchevel in December.

She is a younger sister of the champion skier Marlies Raich (born 1981); they twice shared a podium during the 2014 season, at Courchevel in December and Kranjska Gora in February.

At the 2014 Olympics, Schild was fourth after the first run in the slalom, but failed to finish the second. In June 2016, she married her trainer, Armin Wierer.

== World Cup results ==
=== Season standings ===
Season	Age	Overall	Slalom	Giant slalom	Super-G	Downhill	Combined
2009	19	120	54	—	—	—	—
2010	20						
2011	21	62	20	—	—	—	—
2012	22	74	28	—	—	—	—
2013	23	32	10	—	—	—	—
2014	24	33	7	—	—	—	—
2015	25	46	17	—	—	—	—
2016	26	55	16	—	—	—	—
2017	27	23	8	28	—	—	—
2018	28	14	5	21	—	—	—
2019	29	19	9	20	—	—	—
2020	30						
2021	31	79	37	—	—	—	—

Standings through 4 January 2021

=== Race podiums ===
- 7 podiums – (7 SL); 38 top tens

Season	Date	Location	Discipline	Place
2013	16 Mar 2013	Lenzerheide, Switzerland	Slalom	2nd
2014	17 Dec 2013	Courchevel, France	Slalom	3rd
2014	2 Feb 2014	Kranjska Gora, Slovenia	Slalom	3rd
2017	11 Mar 2017	(United States) Squaw Valley, USA	Slalom	3rd
2018	26 Nov 2017	(United States) Killington, USA	Slalom	3rd
2018	9 Jan 2018	Flachau, Austria	Slalom	2nd
2019	17 Nov 2018	Levi, Finland	Slalom	3rd

== World Championship results ==
Year	Age	Slalom	Giant slalom	Super-G	Downhill	Combined
2013	23	12	—	—	—	—
2015	25	—	—	—	—	—
2017	27	10	17	—	—	—
2019	29	9	DNF1	—	—	—

== Olympic results ==
Year	Age	Slalom	Giant slalom	Super-G	Downhill	Combined
2014	24	DNF2	—	—	—	—
2018	28	7	24	—	—	—
