= Magda Kalomoirou =

Greek alpine skier (born 1979)

Personal information
- Nationality: Greek
- Born: 7 September 1979 (age 45); Thessaloniki, Greece

Sport
- Sport: Alpine skiing

Magda Kalomoirou (born 7 September 1979) is a Greek alpine skier. She competed in two events at the 2006 Winter Olympics.
