= Réka Tuss =

Hungarian alpine skier (born 1977)

Personal information
- Nationality: Hungarian
- Born: 17 July 1977 (age 48) Budapest, Hungary

Sport
- Sport: Alpine skiing

Réka Tuss (born 17 July 1977) is a Hungarian alpine skier. She competed in two events at the 2006 Winter Olympics.
