= Nicole Hosp =

Austrian alpine skier

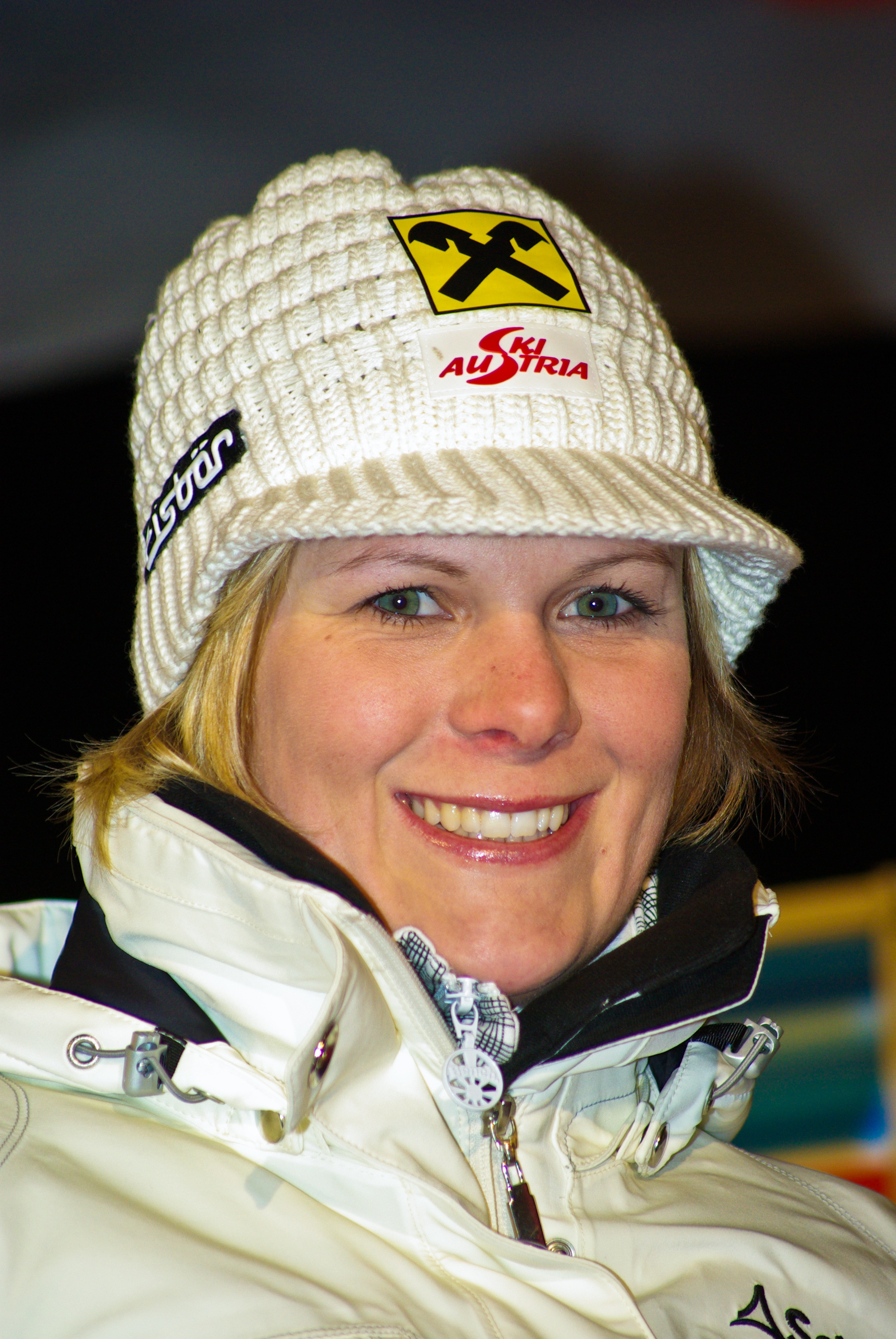
- Hosp in December 2008

Personal information
- Born: 6 November 1983 (age 42) Ehenbichl, Tyrol, Austria
- Height: 174 cm (5 ft 9 in)
- Website: niki-hosp.at

Skiing career
- Sport: Alpine skiing
- Club: Skiklub Bichlbach
- Retired: 1 June 2015 (age 31)
- Disciplines: Slalom, combined, super-G, downhill
- World Cup debut: 18 February 2001 (age 17)

Olympics
- Teams: 2 – (2006, 2014)
- Medals: 3 (0 gold)

World Championships
- Teams: 7 – (2003–15)
- Medals: 9 (3 gold)

World Cup
- Seasons: 15 – (2001–2015)
- Wins: 12
- Podiums: 57
- Overall titles: 1 – (2007)
- Discipline titles: 1 – (GS in 2007)
Medal record
Women's alpine skiing
Representing Austria
Olympic Games
Silver medal – second place	2006 Turin	Slalom
Silver medal – second place	2014 Sochi	Combined
Bronze medal – third place	2014 Sochi	Super-G
World Championships
Gold medal – first place	2007 Åre	Giant slalom
Gold medal – first place	2013 Schladming	Team event
Gold medal – first place	2015 Beaver Creek	Team event
Silver medal – second place	2003 St. Moritz	Combined
Silver medal – second place	2005 Bormio	Team event
Silver medal – second place	2015 Beaver Creek	Combined
Bronze medal – third place	2003 St. Moritz	Slalom
Bronze medal – third place	2007 Åre	Downhill
Bronze medal – third place	2013 Schladming	Combined
Junior World Ski Championships
Bronze medal – third place	2002 Tarvisio	Downhill

Nicole Hosp (German pronunciation: [niːkɔl hɔsp]; born 6 November 1983) is an Austrian former World Cup alpine ski racer. She competed in all five disciplines and was a world champion, three-time Olympic medalist, and an overall World Cup champion.

== Career ==
Born in Ehenbichl, Tyrol, she won her first World Cup competition, giant slalom, in Sölden, Tyrol, Austria on 26 October 2002, sharing the victory with Andrine Flemmen and Tina Maze. Hosp won the overall World Cup title in 2007 and the season title in giant slalom. A versatile all-around racer, she won World Cup races in four of the five alpine skiing disciplines (super-G, giant slalom, slalom and combined), and was world champion in the giant slalom in 2007. Although Hosp won the giant slalom crystal globe in 2007, she stopped racing GS after often not qualifying for the second run in 2011. In her final seasons, she competed in four disciplines: slalom, Super-G, downhill, and combined.

Hosp suffered an anterior cruciate ligament injury to her right knee at Sölden in October 2009 and missed the rest of the 2010 season, including the 2010 Winter Olympics.

== World Cup results ==
=== Season titles ===
- 2 titles – (1 overall, 1 GS)

Season	Discipline
2007	Overall
2007	Giant slalom

=== Season standings ===
Season	Age	Overall	Slalom	Giant slalom	Super-G	Downhill	Combined
2002	18	121	—	58	—	—	—
2003	19	10	10	4	—	—	—
2004	20	12	6	6	—	—	—
2005	21	14	7	6	—	—	4
2006	22	4	6	4	10	23	5
2007	23	1	2	1	2	20	3
2008	24	2	2	7	10	19	9
2009	25	14	8	24	25	46	8
2010	26	Injured in October 2009, missed rest of season					
2011	27	15	12	28	8	—	5
2012	28	22	26	—	20	36	3
2013	29	16	15	—	20	—	2
2014	30	9	8	—	6	22	4
2015	31	5	9	—	6	12	—

=== Race victories ===
- 12 wins – (1 SG, 5 GS, 5 SL, 1 SC)
- 57 podiums – (1 DH, 9 SG, 20 GS, 20 SL, 7 SC)

Season	Date	Location	Discipline
2003	26 Oct 2002	Sölden, Austria	Giant slalom
2004	17 Dec 2003	Madonna di Campiglio, Italy	Slalom
2004	27 Dec 2003	Lienz, Austria	Giant slalom
2006	29 Jan 2006	Cortina d'Ampezzo, Italy	Giant slalom
2006	16 Mar 2006	Åre, Sweden	Super-G
2007	6 Jan 2007	Kranjska Gora, Slovenia	Giant slalom
2007	2 Mar 2007	Tarvisio, Italy	Super combined
2007	17 Mar 2007	Lenzerheide, Switzerland	Slalom
2007	18 Mar 2007	Lenzerheide, Switzerland	Giant slalom
2008	9 Dec 2007	Aspen, USA	Slalom
2008	13 Jan 2008	Maribor, Slovenia	Slalom
2015	30 Nov 2014	Aspen, USA	Slalom

== World Championship results ==
Year	Age	Slalom	Giant slalom	Super-G	Downhill	Combined
2003	19	3	DNF2	—	—	2
2005	21	DNF2	5	—	—	—
2007	23	17	1	4	3	6
2009	25	—	23	—	—	—
2011	27	18	—	12	—	12
2013	29	15	—	—	—	3
2015	31	—	—	DNF	—	2

== Olympic results ==
Year	Age	Slalom	Giant slalom	Super-G	Downhill	Combined
2006	22	2	4	—	—	5
2010	26	injured, did not compete				
2014	30	—	—	3	9	2
