= FIS Alpine World Ski Championships 2007 =

Skiing event in Åre, Sweden

39th FIS Alpine World Ski Championships
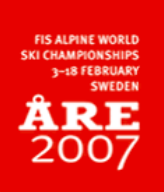
- Host city: Åre, Sweden
- Events: 11
- Opening: 2 February 2007
- Closing: 18 February 2007
- Opened by: Carl XVI Gustaf

Location of Åre in Sweden
Location of Åre in Europe

The FIS Alpine World Ski Championships 2007 were the 39th FIS Alpine World Ski Championships, held 2–18 February in Åre, Sweden. Åre previously hosted the world championships in 1954, and often hosts late season World Cup events.

The FIS awarded the 2007 event in 2002; other finalists were Lillehammer, Norway, and Val-d'Isère, France, which was later selected to host the 2009 championships.

These were the first world championships to use the "super-combined" format (one run each of downhill and slalom) for the combined event. First run on the World Cup circuit in 2005 at Wengen, the "super-combi" format (SC) made its debut at the Winter Olympics in 2010. The traditional combined format (K) consists of one downhill run and two slalom runs.

== Venues ==
- The World Championships Arena was accessed via the "VM-8an," an 8-passenger hybrid lift installed in 2006.
  The races were held on the Gästrappet, Lundsrappet, Störtloppet and VM-Störtloppet slopes.
- The medal ceremonies were held at the Medal Plaza at Åre Torg.
- The opening ceremony was held at the Festival Arena, situated outside the Holiday Club Hotel by Lake Åre.

== Course information ==
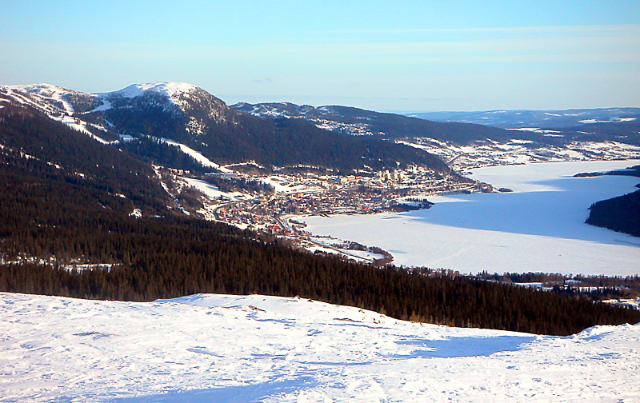
A view of Åre Lake from the ski area

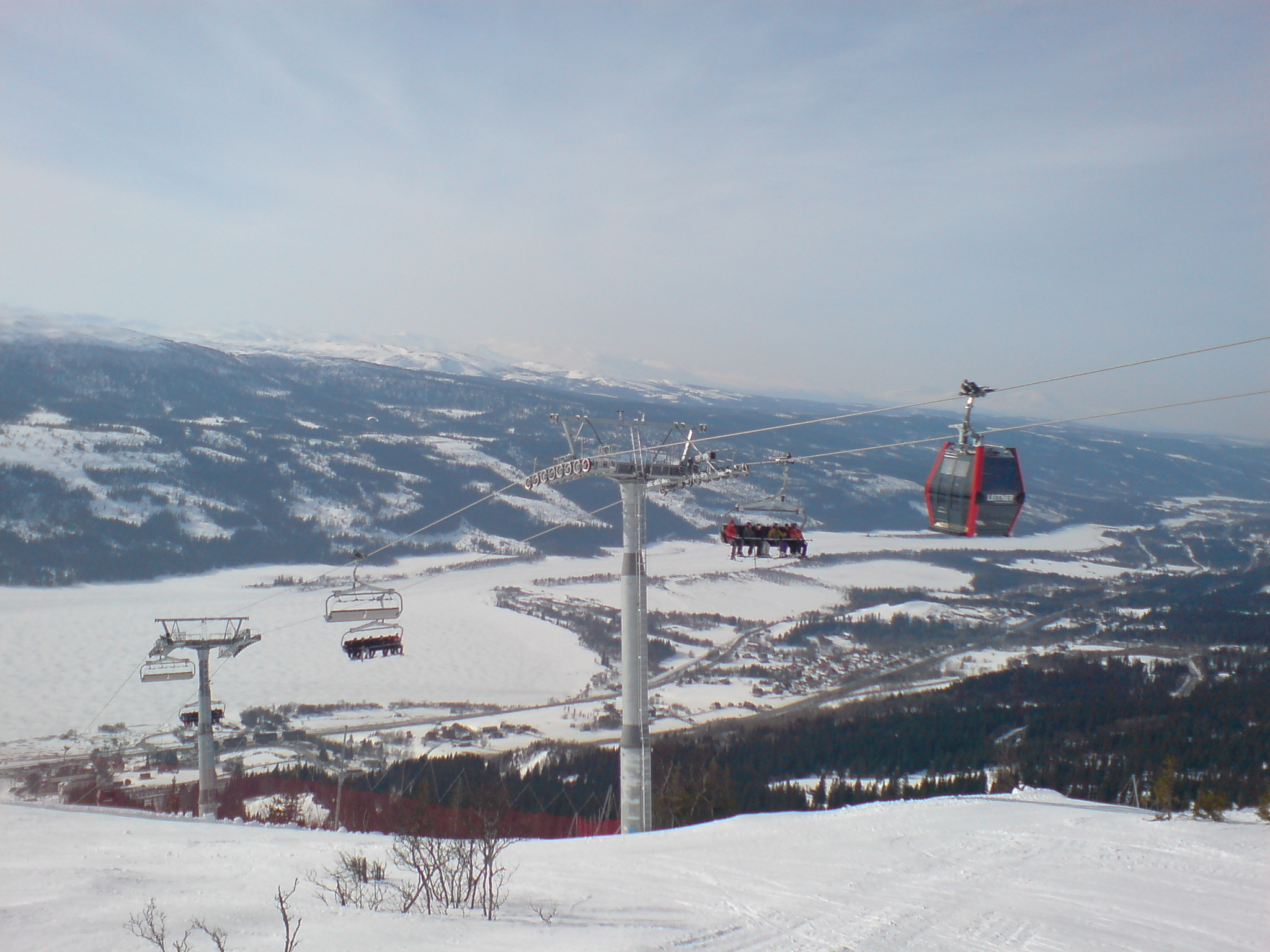
"VM 8:an" hybrid lift, installed in 2006 for the 2007 World Championships

Course information (metric)
| Race | Start elevation | Finish elevation | Vertical drop | Course length | Minimum gradient | Maximum gradient | Average gradient |
|---|---|---|---|---|---|---|---|
| Downhill – men | 1240 m | 396 m | 844 m | 2.922 km | 7% | 69% | 33% |
| Downhill – women | 1055 | 396 | 659 | 2.236 | 14% | 69% | 31% |
| Super-G – men | 1033 | 396 | 637 | 2.127 | 10% | 69% | 34% |
| Super-G – women | 971 | 396 | 575 | 1.903 | 14% | 69% | 32% |
| Giant slalom – men | 812 | 396 | 416 | 1.308 | 13% | 69% | 35% |
| Giant slalom – women | 796 | 396 | 400 | 1.257 | 17% | 48% | 36% |
| Slalom – men | 615 | 396 | 219 | 0.740 | 19% | 48% | 32% |
| Slalom – women | 582 | 396 | 186 | 0.62 | 14% | 48% | 32% |

Course information (imperial)
| Race | Start elevation | Finish elevation | Vertical drop | Course length | Minimum gradient | Maximum gradient | Average gradient |
|---|---|---|---|---|---|---|---|
| Downhill – men | 4068 ft | 1299 ft | 2769 ft | 1.816 mi. | 7% | 69% | 33% |
| Downhill – women | 3461 | 1299 | 2162 | 1.389 | 14% | 69% | 31% |
| Super-G – men | 3389 | 1299 | 2090 | 1.322 | 10% | 69% | 34% |
| Super-G – women | 3186 | 1299 | 1887 | 1.182 | 14% | 69% | 32% |
| Giant slalom – men | 2664 | 1299 | 1365 | 0.813 | 13% | 69% | 35% |
| Giant slalom – women | 2612 | 1299 | 1313 | 0.781 | 17% | 48% | 36% |
| Slalom – men | 2018 | 1299 | 719 | 0.460 | 19% | 48% | 32% |
| Slalom – women | 1909 | 1299 | 610 | 0.388 | 14% | 48% | 32% |

== Opening ceremony ==
2 February 19:00

- The King of Sweden, Carl XVI Gustaf, officially opened the FIS Alpine World Ski Championships

== Men's events ==
=== Men's downhill ===
10 February 12:30. Race postponed to 11 February 10:00 CET due to foggy weather conditions.

| Medal | Name | Nation | Time | Diff. |
|---|---|---|---|---|
| 1st place, gold medalist(s) | Aksel Lund Svindal | NOR | 1:44.68 | |
| 2nd place, silver medalist(s) | Jan Hudec | CAN | 1:45.40 | +0.72 |
| 3rd place, bronze medalist(s) | Patrik Järbyn | SWE | 1:45.65 | +0.97 |

=== Men's super-G ===
Originally planned for 3 February 12:30; postponed to 5 February due to wind conditions.

Race was postponed for a second time, to 6 February 10:00 CET.

| Medal | Name | Nation | Time | Diff. |
|---|---|---|---|---|
| 1st place, gold medalist(s) | Patrick Staudacher | ITA | 1:14.30 | |
| 2nd place, silver medalist(s) | Fritz Strobl | AUT | 1:14.62 | +0.32 |
| 3rd place, bronze medalist(s) | Bruno Kernen | SUI | 1:14.92 | +0.62 |

=== Men's giant slalom ===
Qualification: 12 February 10:00/13:30

Final: 14 February 10:00/13:00

| Medal | Name | Nation | Time | Diff. |
|---|---|---|---|---|
| 1st place, gold medalist(s) | Aksel Lund Svindal | NOR | 2:19.64 | |
| 2nd place, silver medalist(s) | Daniel Albrecht | SUI | 2:20.12 | +0.48 |
| 3rd place, bronze medalist(s) | Didier Cuche | SUI | 2:20.56 | +0.92 |

=== Men's slalom ===
Qualification: 15 February 10:00/13:30

Final: 17 February 10:00/13:00

| Medal | Name | Nation | Time | Diff. |
|---|---|---|---|---|
| 1st place, gold medalist(s) | Mario Matt | AUT | 1:57.33 | |
| 2nd place, silver medalist(s) | Manfred Mölgg | ITA | 1:59.14 | +1.81 |
| 3rd place, bronze medalist(s) | Jean-Baptiste Grange | FRA | 1:59.54 | +2.21 |

=== Men's super combined ===
8 February 12:30/16:00

| Medal | Name | Nation | Time | Diff. |
|---|---|---|---|---|
| 1st place, gold medalist(s) | Daniel Albrecht | SUI | 2:28.99 | |
| 2nd place, silver medalist(s) | Benjamin Raich | AUT | 2:29.07 | +0.08 |
| 3rd place, bronze medalist(s) | Marc Berthod | SUI | 2:29.23 | +0.24 |

== Women's events ==
=== Women's downhill ===
11 February 12:30

| Medal | Name | Nation | Time | Diff. |
|---|---|---|---|---|
| 1st place, gold medalist(s) | Anja Pärson | SWE | 1:26.89 | |
| 2nd place, silver medalist(s) | Lindsey C. Kildow | USA | 1:27.29 | +0.40 |
| 3rd place, bronze medalist(s) | Nicole Hosp | AUT | 1:27.37 | +0.48 |

=== Women's super-G ===
Originally planned for 4 February 12:30; postponed to 6 February due to wind conditions.

| Medal | Name | Nation | Time | Diff. |
|---|---|---|---|---|
| 1st place, gold medalist(s) | Anja Pärson | SWE | 1:18.85 | |
| 2nd place, silver medalist(s) | Lindsey C. Kildow | USA | 1:19.17 | +0.32 |
| 3rd place, bronze medalist(s) | Renate Götschl | AUT | 1:19.38 | +0.53 |

=== Women's giant slalom ===
13 February 17:00/20:00

| Medal | Name | Nation | Time | Diff. |
|---|---|---|---|---|
| 1st place, gold medalist(s) | Nicole Hosp | AUT | 2:31.72 | |
| 2nd place, silver medalist(s) | Maria Pietilä-Holmner | SWE | 2:32.57 | + 0.85 |
| 3rd place, bronze medalist(s) | Denise Karbon | ITA | 2:32.69 | + 0.97 |

=== Women's slalom ===
16 February 17:00/20:00

| Medal | Name | Nation | Time | Diff. |
|---|---|---|---|---|
| 1st place, gold medalist(s) | Šárka Záhrobská | CZE | 1:43.91 | |
| 2nd place, silver medalist(s) | Marlies Schild | AUT | 1:44.02 | +0.11 |
| 3rd place, bronze medalist(s) | Anja Pärson | SWE | 1:44.07 | +0.16 |

=== Women's super combined ===
9 February 12:30/16:00

| Medal | Name | Nation | Time | Diff. |
|---|---|---|---|---|
| 1st place, gold medalist(s) | Anja Pärson | SWE | 1:57.69 | |
| 2nd place, silver medalist(s) | Julia Mancuso | USA | 1:58.50 | +0.81 |
| 3rd place, bronze medalist(s) | Marlies Schild | AUT | 1:58.54 | +0.85 |

== Team event ==
=== Nations team event ===
18 February 10:00/13:00

This competition was part of the World Championships for the second time. Six athletes from each country, including at least two men and two women, compete in a total of four super-G and four slalom runs. Each country sends one athlete into each run, alternating between men and women. The placings of all eight competitions are added, and the country with the lowest number wins. If an athlete doesn't finish the run, gets disqualified or scores a time worse than 108% of the winning time, an extra penalty is incurred. If an athlete doesn't start, an even greater penalty is incurred.

| Medal | Name | Nation | SG1 | SG2 | SG3 | SG4 | SL1 | SL2 | SL3 | SL4 | Total |
|---|---|---|---|---|---|---|---|---|---|---|---|
| 1st place, gold medalist(s) | Renate Götschl; Michaela Kirchgasser; Marlies Schild; Mario Matt; Fritz Strobl; Benjamin Raich | AUT | 1 | 1 | 1 | 2 | 4 | 4 | 1 | 4 | 18 |
| 2nd place, silver medalist(s) | Anna Ottosson; Anja Pärson; Jens Byggmark; Patrik Järbyn; Markus Larsson; Hans Olsson | SWE | 4 | 8 | 4 | 7 | 1 | 2 | 2 | 5 | 33 |
| 3rd place, bronze medalist(s) | Sandra Gini; Rabea Grand; Nadia Styger; Fabienne Suter; Daniel Albrecht; Marc Berthod | SUI | 11 | 3 | 2 | 1 | 2 | 5 | 4 | 11 | 39 |

== Medal table ==
| Place | Nation | 1st place, gold medalist(s) | 2nd place, silver medalist(s) | 3rd place, bronze medalist(s) | Total |
|---|---|---|---|---|---|
| 1 | Austria | 3 | 3 | 3 | 9 |
| 2 | Sweden | 3 | 2 | 2 | 7 |
| 3 | Norway | 2 | 0 | 0 | 2 |
| 4 | Switzerland | 1 | 1 | 4 | 6 |
| 5 | Italy | 1 | 1 | 1 | 3 |
| 6 | Czech Republic | 1 | 0 | 0 | 1 |
| 7 | United States | 0 | 3 | 0 | 3 |
| 8 | Canada | 0 | 1 | 0 | 1 |
| 9 | France | 0 | 0 | 1 | 1 |

== Participating nations ==
60 nations participated: (number of athletes in parentheses)

- Andorra (2)
- Argentina (2)
- Armenia (7)
- Australia (5)
- Austria (26)
- Belgium (5)
- Bosnia and Herzegovina (9)
- Brazil (3)
- Bulgaria (4)
- Canada (20)
- Chile (4)
- China (10)
- Croatia (10)
- Cyprus (3)
- Czech Republic (14)
- Denmark (6)
- Estonia (2)
- Finland (12)
- France (23)
- Georgia (3)
- Germany (18)
- Ghana (1)
- Great Britain (4)
- Greece (2)
- Hungary (8)
- Iceland (10)
- Iran (9)
- Ireland (4)
- Israel (1)
- Italy (24)
- Japan (6)
- Kazakhstan (7)
- Kyrgyzstan (7)
- Latvia (8)
- Lebanon (4)
- Liechtenstein (5)
- Lithuania (3)
- Luxembourg (2)
- North Macedonia (6)
- Moldova (3)
- Monaco (1)
- Montenegro (1)
- Netherlands (4)
- New Zealand (8)
- Norway (8)
- Poland (6)
- Romania (3)
- Russia (6)
- San Marino (2)
- Senegal (1)
- Serbia (6)
- Slovakia (4)
- Slovenia (16)
- Spain (6)
- Sweden (19)
- Switzerland (14)
- Turkey (4)
- Ukraine (2)
- United States (18)
- Uzbekistan (4)
