= Marija Trmčić =

Serbian alpine skier (born 1986)

Marija Trmčić (Serbian Cyrillic: Марија Трмчић; born 20 October 1986 in Užice, Yugoslavia) is a Serbian alpine skier.

She participated for Serbia both at the 2006 Winter Olympics and the 2010 Winter Olympics, World Championships in Are (Sweden) and Val d Isere (France) Winter Universiade in Bardonecchia in Italy and in Harbin in China. She is a longtime champion of Jugoslavia and Serbia in slalom and giant slalom and a medal winner at national and international competitions. Since 2010. she is I.S.I.A International Ski Instructor and member of Montenegro Demo Ski Team and Demo Team of Serbia. Works in family company, Agency for sport education Ski Art & Raft, with her father and coach Zoran. Marija is married to Petar Bogojević, ex basketball player. In 2014 they got a daughter Kalina. In December 2017, she was elected a member of City Council of Užice, Marija's hometown.

== Olympic results ==
Event	Slalom
2006 Turin	46.
2010 Vancouver	DNF
