= 2013–14 FIS Alpine Ski World Cup =

International sports competition

2013–14 FIS Alpine Ski World Cup champions
Discipline	Men	Women
Overall	(Austria) Marcel Hirscher	(Austria) Anna Fenninger
Downhill	(Norway) Aksel Lund Svindal	(Germany) Maria Höfl-Riesch
Super-G	(Norway) Aksel Lund Svindal	(Switzerland) Lara Gut
Giant slalom	(United States) Ted Ligety	(Austria) Anna Fenninger
Slalom	(Austria) Marcel Hirscher	(United States) Mikaela Shiffrin
Nations Cup	Austria	Austria
- Nations Cup Overall: Austria

Competition
Locations	16	16
Individual	34	32
Mixed	2	2
Cancelled	1	2
Rescheduled	3	8

2014 World Cup Champions

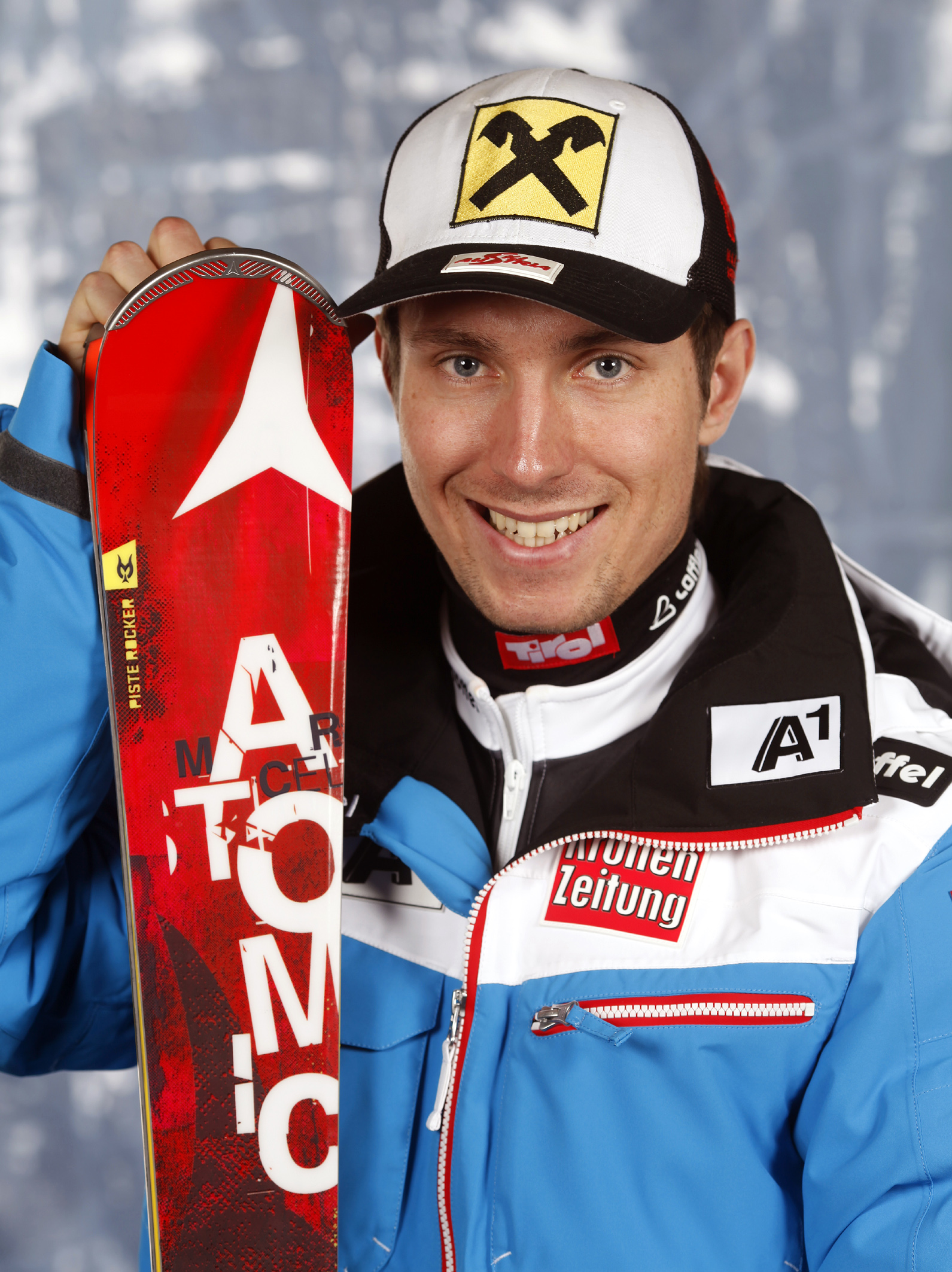
Marcel Hirscher won three consecutive overalls, the first since Phil Mahre in 1983.

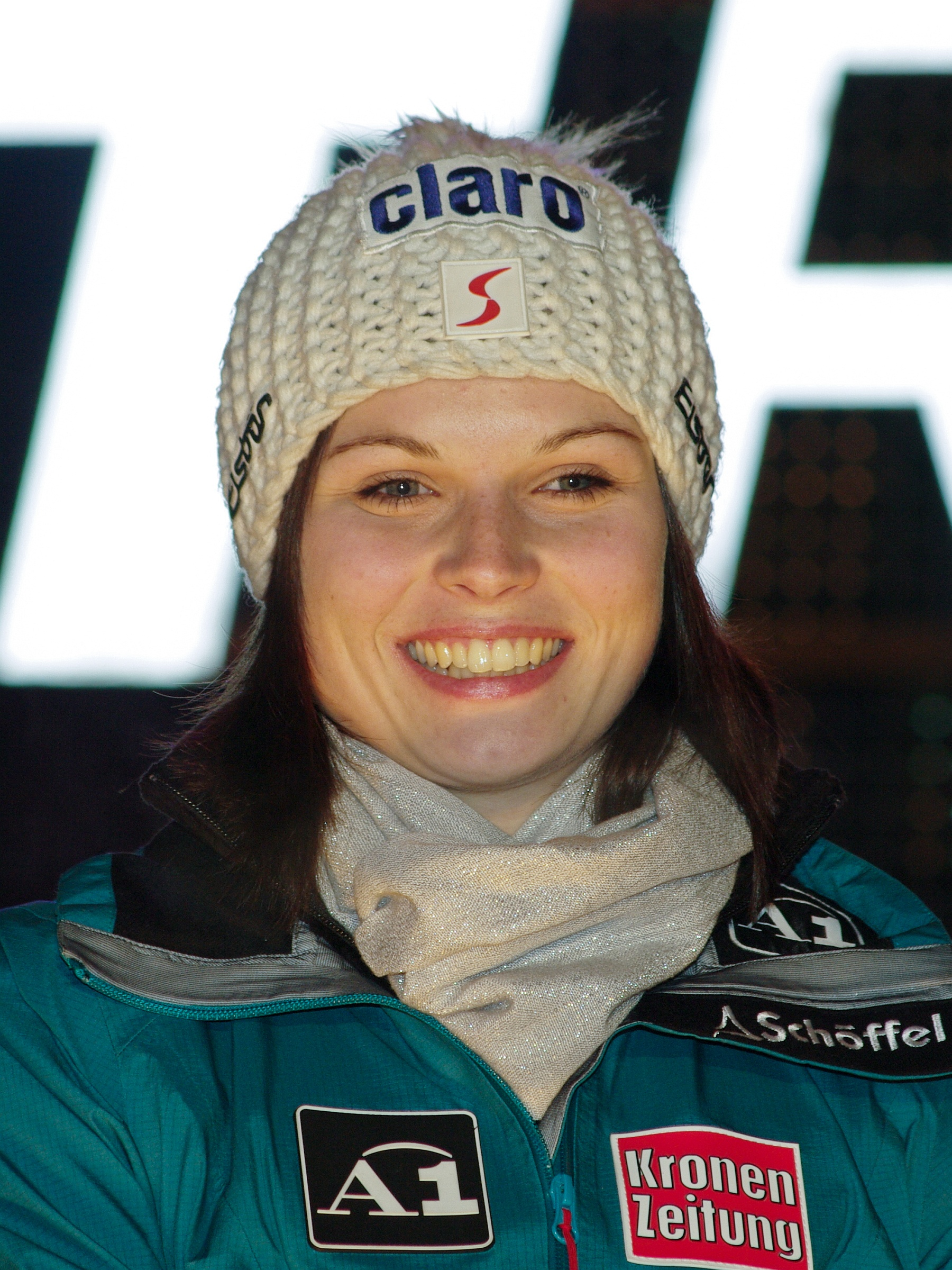
Anna Fenninger won her first overall.

The 48th World Cup season began on 26 October 2013, in Sölden, Austria, and concluded on 16 March 2014 at the World Cup finals in Lenzerheide, Switzerland. The defending overall champions from the 2013 season were Marcel Hirscher of Austria and Tina Maze of Slovenia. The overall titles were won by Hirscher and Anna Fenninger, also of Austria. The season was interrupted by the 2014 Winter Olympics that took place from 7 to 23 February in Sochi, Russia, with the alpine events at Rosa Khutor.

== Summary ==
The men's title was won by Hirscher for the third time in a row, becoming the first man to achieve this since Phil Mahre in 1983. Hirscher secured the title after the second-to-last race of the season when he beat Aksel Lund Svindal of Norway, who did not compete in slalom. Svindal won both the downhill (second time in a row) and super-G titles (third time in a row). The giant slalom title went to Ted Ligety of the United States. Ligety and Hirscher shared the same number of points but Ligety had more victories (4, as opposed to 2 by Hirscher). This was Ligety's second consecutive giant slalom title and fifth overall. The slalom title went to Hirscher, who secured it in the last race of the season. The combined title was shared by Ligety and Alexis Pinturault of France, who each won a first and a second place in two combined races of the season.

Fenninger won the overall women's title, her first, and the first by an Austrian woman since Nicole Hosp in 2007. It was the first time since 2002 that both overall titles were won by Austrians. Fenninger secured the title at the super-G finals in Lenzerheide after her closest competitor, Maria Höfl-Riesch of Germany, suffered an injury a day earlier in the downhill which ended her season. At the end of the season, Höfl-Riesch announced her retirement from the World Cup circuit. Höfl-Riesch won the downhill title, Lara Gut of Switzerland won the super-G title and also most races of the season (seven, followed by five of Mikaela Shiffrin of the United States, who also won the slalom title). The giant slalom title went to Fenninger who secured it in the last race. There was only one combined event in the 2014 season, which was won by Marie-Michèle Gagnon, who therefore also won the combined title. Maze of Slovenia, the 2013 overall champion, was less successful this year compared to her record-breaking 2013 season. She won one race and four more podiums and finished fourth in the final standings. However, she stated that her main goal in the season were the Sochi Olympics, where she won two gold medals, in downhill and in giant slalom. Tina Weirather of Liechtenstein was another strong performer, holding a second place before the Olympics, but suffered an injury in downhill training in Sochi and had to skip the rest of the season, finishing fifth overall. Returning from a knee injury at the 2013 World Championships, four-time overall champion Lindsey Vonn of the U.S. appeared in only four races, all speed events in December 2013.

== Calendar ==
=== Men ===
Event key: DH – Downhill, SL – Slalom, GS – Giant slalom, SG – Super giant slalom, SC – Super combined, CE – City Event (Parallel)
Race	Season	Date	Place	Type	Winner	Second	Third	Details
1522	1	27 October 2013	(Austria) Sölden	GS _{364}	(United States) Ted Ligety	(France) Alexis Pinturault	(Austria) Marcel Hirscher	
1523	2	17 November 2013	(Finland) Levi	SL _{431}	(Austria) Marcel Hirscher	(Austria) Mario Matt	(Norway) Henrik Kristoffersen	
1524	3	30 November 2013	(Canada) Lake Louise	DH _{433}	(Italy) Dominik Paris	(Austria) Klaus Kröll	(France) Adrien Théaux	
1525	4	1 December 2013	(Canada) Lake Louise	SG _{172}	(Norway) Aksel Lund Svindal	(Austria) Matthias Mayer	(Austria) Georg Streitberger	
1526	5	6 December 2013	(United States) Beaver Creek	DH _{434}	(Norway) Aksel Lund Svindal	(Austria) Hannes Reichelt	(Italy) Peter Fill	
1527	6	7 December 2013	(United States) Beaver Creek	SG _{173}	(Switzerland) Patrick Küng	(Austria) Otmar Striedinger	(Italy) Peter Fill (Austria) Hannes Reichelt	
1528	7	8 December 2013	(United States) Beaver Creek	GS _{365}	(United States) Ted Ligety	(United States) Bode Miller	(Austria) Marcel Hirscher	
1529	8	14 December 2013	(France) Val-d'Isère	GS _{366}	(Austria) Marcel Hirscher	(France) Thomas Fanara	(Germany) Stefan Luitz	
1530	9	15 December 2013	(France) Val-d'Isère	SL _{432}	(Austria) Mario Matt	(Sweden) Mattias Hargin	(Italy) Patrick Thaler	
1531	10	20 December 2013	(Italy) Val Gardena	SG _{174}	(Norway) Aksel Lund Svindal	(Canada) Jan Hudec	(France) Adrien Théaux	
1532	11	21 December 2013	(Italy) Val Gardena	DH _{435}	(Canada) Erik Guay	(Norway) Kjetil Jansrud	(France) Johan Clarey	
1533	12	22 December 2013	(Italy) Alta Badia	GS _{367}	(Austria) Marcel Hirscher	(France) Alexis Pinturault	(United States) Ted Ligety	
1534	13	29 December 2013	(Italy) Bormio	DH _{436}	(Norway) Aksel Lund Svindal	(Austria) Hannes Reichelt	(Canada) Erik Guay	
		1 January 2014	(Germany) Munich	CE _{cnx}	warm temperatures			
		6 January 2014	(Croatia) Zagreb	SL _{cnx}	warm temperatures; replaced in Bormio on 6 January 2014			
1535	14	(Note: Slalom from Zagreb was rescheduled to Bormio on 6 January 2014)6 January 2014	(Italy) Bormio	SL _{433}	(Germany) Felix Neureuther	(Austria) Marcel Hirscher	(Italy) Manfred Mölgg	
1536	15	11 January 2014	(Switzerland) Adelboden	GS _{368}	(Germany) Felix Neureuther	(France) Thomas Fanara	(Austria) Marcel Hirscher	
1537	16	12 January 2014	(Switzerland) Adelboden	SL _{434}	(Austria) Marcel Hirscher	(Sweden) André Myhrer	(Norway) Henrik Kristoffersen	
1538	17	17 January 2014	(Switzerland) Wengen	SC _{119}	(United States) Ted Ligety	(France) Alexis Pinturault	(Croatia) Natko Zrnčić-Dim	
1539	18	18 January 2014	(Switzerland) Wengen	DH _{437}	(Switzerland) Patrick Küng	(Austria) Hannes Reichelt	(Norway) Aksel Lund Svindal	
1540	19	19 January 2014	(Switzerland) Wengen	SL _{435}	(France) Alexis Pinturault	(Germany) Felix Neureuther	(Austria) Marcel Hirscher	
1541	20	24 January 2014	(Austria) Kitzbühel	SL _{436}	(Germany) Felix Neureuther	(Norway) Henrik Kristoffersen	(Italy) Patrick Thaler	
1542	21	25 January 2014	(Austria) Kitzbühel	DH _{438}	(Austria) Hannes Reichelt	(Norway) Aksel Lund Svindal	(United States) Bode Miller	
1543	22	26 January 2014	(Austria) Kitzbühel	SG _{175}	(Switzerland) Didier Défago	(United States) Bode Miller	(Austria) Max Franz (Norway) Aksel Lund Svindal	
1544	23	26 January 2014	(Austria) Kitzbühel	SC _{120}	(France) Alexis Pinturault	(United States) Ted Ligety	(Austria) Marcel Hirscher	
1545	24	28 January 2014	(Austria) Schladming	SL _{437}	(Norway) Henrik Kristoffersen	(Austria) Marcel Hirscher	(Germany) Felix Neureuther	
		1 February 2014	(Germany) Garmisch-Partenkirchen	DH _{cnx}	lack of snow; replaced in St. Moritz on 1 February 2014			
		2 February 2014	(Germany) Garmisch-Partenkirchen	GS _{cnx}	lack of snow; replaced in St. Moritz on 2 February 2014			
		(Note: Downhill from Garmisch-Partenkirchen was rescheduled to St. Moritz on 1 February 2014)1 February 2014	(Switzerland) St. Moritz	DH _{cnx}	fog; finally replaced in Kvitfjell on 28 February 2014			
1546	25	(Note: Super giant slalom from Garmisch-Partenkirchen was rescheduled from St. Moritz to Kvitfjell on 28 February 2014)2 February 2014	(Switzerland) St. Moritz	GS _{369}	(United States) Ted Ligety	(Austria) Marcel Hirscher	(France) Alexis Pinturault	
2014 Winter Olympics (7–23 February)
1547	26	(Note: Super giant slalom from Garmisch-Partenkirchen was rescheduled from St. Moritz to Kvitfjell on 28 February 2014)28 February 2014	(Norway) Kvitfjell	DH _{439}	(Norway) Kjetil Jansrud (Austria) Georg Streitberger		(United States) Travis Ganong	
1548	27	1 March 2014	(Norway) Kvitfjell	DH _{440}	(Canada) Erik Guay	(France) Johan Clarey	(Austria) Matthias Mayer	
1549	28	2 March 2014	(Norway) Kvitfjell	SG _{176}	(Norway) Kjetil Jansrud	(Switzerland) Patrick Küng	(Austria) Matthias Mayer	
1550	29	8 March 2014	(Slovenia) Kranjska Gora	GS _{370}	(United States) Ted Ligety	(Austria) Benjamin Raich	(Norway) Henrik Kristoffersen	
1551	30	9 March 2014	(Slovenia) Kranjska Gora	SL _{438}	(Germany) Felix Neureuther	(Germany) Fritz Dopfer	(Norway) Henrik Kristoffersen	
1552	31	12 March 2014	(Switzerland) Lenzerheide	DH _{441}	(Austria) Matthias Mayer	(Italy) Christof Innerhofer (United States) Ted Ligety		
1553	32	13 March 2014	(Switzerland) Lenzerheide	SG _{177}	(France) Alexis Pinturault	(France) Thomas Mermillod-Blondin	(United States) Bode Miller	
1554	33	15 March 2014	(Switzerland) Lenzerheide	GS _{371}	(United States) Ted Ligety	(France) Alexis Pinturault	(Germany) Felix Neureuther	
1555	34	16 March 2014	(Switzerland) Lenzerheide	SL _{439}	(Austria) Marcel Hirscher	(Germany) Felix Neureuther	(Austria) Mario Matt	

=== Women ===
Event key: DH – Downhill, SL – Slalom, GS – Giant slalom, SG – Super giant slalom, SC – Super combined, CE – City Event (Parallel)
Race	Season	Date	Place	Type	Winner	Second	Third	Details
1423	1	26 October 2013	(Austria) Sölden	GS _{364}	(Switzerland) Lara Gut	(Austria) Kathrin Zettel	(Germany) Viktoria Rebensburg	
1424	2	16 November 2013	(Finland) Levi	SL _{410}	(United States) Mikaela Shiffrin	(Germany) Maria Höfl-Riesch	(Slovenia) Tina Maze	
1425	3	29 November 2013	(United States) Beaver Creek	DH _{360}	(Switzerland) Lara Gut	(Liechtenstein) Tina Weirather	(Italy) Elena Fanchini	
1426	4	30 November 2013	(United States) Beaver Creek	SG _{191}	(Switzerland) Lara Gut	(Austria) Anna Fenninger	(Austria) Nicole Hosp	
1427	5	1 December 2013	(United States) Beaver Creek	GS _{365}	(Sweden) Jessica Lindell-Vikarby	(United States) Mikaela Shiffrin	(Liechtenstein) Tina Weirather	
1428	6	6 December 2013	(Canada) Lake Louise	DH _{361}	(Germany) Maria Höfl-Riesch	(Switzerland) Marianne Kaufmann-Abderhalden	(Italy) Elena Fanchini	
1429	7	7 December 2013	(Canada) Lake Louise	DH _{362}	(Germany) Maria Höfl-Riesch	(Liechtenstein) Tina Weirather	(Austria) Anna Fenninger	
1430	8	8 December 2013	(Canada) Lake Louise	SG _{192}	(Switzerland) Lara Gut	(Liechtenstein) Tina Weirather	(Austria) Anna Fenninger	
1431	9	14 December 2013	(Switzerland) St. Moritz	SG _{193}	(Liechtenstein) Tina Weirather	(Sweden) Kajsa Kling	(Austria) Anna Fenninger	
1432	10	15 December 2013	(Switzerland) St. Moritz	GS _{366}	(France) Tessa Worley	(Sweden) Jessica Lindell-Vikarby	(Slovenia) Tina Maze	
1433	11	17 December 2013	(France) Courchevel	SL _{411}	(Austria) Marlies Schild	(Sweden) Frida Hansdotter	(Austria) Bernadette Schild	
1434	12	21 December 2013	(France) Val-d'Isère	DH _{363}	(Switzerland) Marianne Kaufmann-Abderhalden	(Slovenia) Tina Maze	(Austria) Cornelia Hütter	
1435	13	22 December 2013	(France) Val-d'Isère	GS _{367}	(Liechtenstein) Tina Weirather	(Switzerland) Lara Gut	(Sweden) Maria Pietilä-Holmner	
1436	14	28 December 2013	(Austria) Lienz	GS _{368}	(Austria) Anna Fenninger	(Sweden) Jessica Lindell-Vikarby	(United States) Mikaela Shiffrin	
1437	15	29 December 2013	(Austria) Lienz	SL _{412}	(Austria) Marlies Schild	(United States) Mikaela Shiffrin	(Germany) Maria Höfl-Riesch	
		1 January 2014	(Germany) Munich	CE _{cnx}	warm temperatures			
		4 January 2014	(Croatia) Zagreb	SL _{cnx}	warm temperatures; replaced in Bormio on 5 January 2014			
1438	16	(Note: Slalom from Zagreb was rescheduled to Bormio on 5 January 2014)5 January 2014	(Italy) Bormio	SL _{413}	(United States) Mikaela Shiffrin	(Sweden) Maria Pietilä-Holmner	(France) Nastasia Noens	
1439	17	11 January 2014	(Austria) Altenmarkt	DH _{364}	(Austria) Elisabeth Görgl	(Austria) Anna Fenninger	(Germany) Maria Höfl-Riesch	
1440	18	12 January 2014	(Austria) Altenmarkt	SC _{094}	(Canada) Marie-Michèle Gagnon	(Austria) Michaela Kirchgasser	(Germany) Maria Höfl-Riesch	
1441	19	14 January 2014	(Austria) Flachau	SL _{414}	(United States) Mikaela Shiffrin	(Sweden) Frida Hansdotter	(Sweden) Maria Pietilä Holmner	
		18 January 2014	(Italy) Cortina d'Ampezzo	DH _{cnx}	winter storm; replaced in Cortina d'Ampezzo on 19 January 2014			
		(Note: Downhill from Cortina d'Ampezzo was first rescheduled first 19 the again moved to 24 January 2014)19 January 2014	(Italy) Cortina d'Ampezzo	DH _{cnx}	winter storm; second and final replace in Cortina d'Ampezzo on 24 January 2014			
		19 January 2014	(Italy) Cortina d'Ampezzo	SG _{cnx}	winter storm; replaced in Cortina d'Ampezzo on 23 January 2014			
1442	20	(Note: Super giant slalom from Cortina d'Ampezzo was rescheduled to 23 January 2014)23 January 2014	(Italy) Cortina d'Ampezzo	SG _{194}	(Austria) Elisabeth Görgl	(Germany) Maria Höfl-Riesch	(Austria) Nicole Hosp	
1443	21	(Note: Downhill from Cortina d'Ampezzo was rescheduled from 19 to 24 January 2014)24 January 2014	(Italy) Cortina d'Ampezzo	DH _{365}	(Germany) Maria Höfl-Riesch	(Liechtenstein) Tina Weirather	(Austria) Nicole Schmidhofer	
		25 January 2014	(Germany) Garmisch-Partenkirchen	DH _{cnx}	lack of snow; replaced in Cortina d'Ampezzo on 25 January 2014			
		26 January 2014	(Germany) Garmisch-Partenkirchen	SG _{cnx}	lack of snow; replaced in Cortina d'Ampezzo on 26 January 2014			
1444	22	(Note: Downhill from Garmisch-Partenkirchen was rescheduled to Cortina d'Ampezzo on 25 January 2014)25 January 2014	(Italy) Cortina d'Ampezzo	DH _{366}	(Slovenia) Tina Maze	(Switzerland) Marianne Kaufmann-Abderhalden	(Liechtenstein) Tina Weirather	
1445	23	(Note: Super giant slalom from Garmisch-Partenkirchen was rescheduled to Cortina d'Ampezzo on 26 January 2014)26 January 2014	(Italy) Cortina d'Ampezzo	SG _{195}	(Switzerland) Lara Gut	(Liechtenstein) Tina Weirather	(Germany) Maria Höfl-Riesch	
		1 February 2014	(Slovenia) Maribor	GS _{cnx}	lack of snow; replaced in Kranjska Gora on 1 February 2014			
		2 February 2014	(Slovenia) Maribor	SL _{cnx}	lack of snow; finally replaced in Kranjska Gora on 2 February 2014			
		(Note: Giant slalom from Maribor was rescheduled from Kranjska Gora to Åre on 6 March 2014)1 February 2014	(Slovenia) Kranjska Gora	GS _{cnx}	heavy snowfall; finally replaced in Åre on 6 March 2014			
1446	24	(Note: Slalom from Maribor was rescheduled to Kranjska Gora on 2 February 2014)2 February 2014	(Slovenia) Kranjska Gora	SL _{415}	(Sweden) Frida Hansdotter	(Austria) Marlies Schild	(Austria) Bernadette Schild	
2014 Winter Olympics (7–23 February)
		1 March 2014	(Switzerland) Crans-Montana	DH _{cnx}	fog; replaced in Crans-Montana on 2 March			
1447	25	(Note: Downhill from Crans-Montana was rescheduled from 1 to 2 March 2014)2 March 2014	(Switzerland) Crans-Montana	DH _{367}	(Austria) Andrea Fischbacher	(Austria) Anna Fenninger	(Slovenia) Tina Maze	
		(Note: Super combined was canceled. Downhill from Crans Montana was rescheduled from 1 to 2 March 2014)2 March 2014	(Switzerland) Crans-Montana	SC _{cnx}	cancelled; rescheduled with downhill			
1448	26	(Note: Giant slalom original from Maribor was rescheduled from Kranjska Gora to Åre on 6 March 2014)6 March 2014	(Sweden) Åre	GS _{369}	(Austria) Anna Fenninger	(France) Anemone Marmottan	(Austria) Eva-Maria Brem (Switzerland) Lara Gut	
1449	27	7 March 2014	(Sweden) Åre	GS _{370}	(Austria) Anna Fenninger	(Germany) Viktoria Rebensburg	(Sweden) Jessica Lindell-Vikarby	
1450	28	8 March 2014	(Sweden) Åre	SL _{416}	(United States) Mikaela Shiffrin	(Sweden) Maria Pietilä-Holmner	(Sweden) Anna Swenn-Larsson	
1451	29	12 March 2014	(Switzerland) Lenzerheide	DH _{368}	(Switzerland) Lara Gut	(Austria) Elisabeth Görgl	(Switzerland) Fränzi Aufdenblatten	
1452	30	13 March 2014	(Switzerland) Lenzerheide	SG _{196}	(Switzerland) Lara Gut	(Austria) Anna Fenninger	(Slovenia) Tina Maze	
1453	31	15 March 2014	(Switzerland) Lenzerheide	SL _{417}	(United States) Mikaela Shiffrin	(Sweden) Frida Hansdotter	(Austria) Marlies Schild	
1454	32	16 March 2014	(Switzerland) Lenzerheide	GS _{371}	(Austria) Anna Fenninger	(Austria) Eva-Maria Brem	(Sweden) Jessica Lindell-Vikarby	

=== Nation team event ===
Event key: PG – Parallel giant slalom
Race	Season	Date	Place	Type	Winner	Second	Third	Details
8	1	25 February 2014	(Austria) Innsbruck	PG _{005}	Sweden Maria Pietilä-Holmner; Anna Swenn-Larsson; Mattias Hargin; Anton Lahdenperä; Markus Larsson	Norway Mona Løseth; Nina Løseth; Sebastian Foss Solevåg; Truls Johansen	Switzerland Denise Feierabend; Wendy Holdener; Nadja Vogel; Marc Gini; Reto Schmidiger; Markus Vogel	
9	2	14 March 2014	(Switzerland) Lenzerheide	PG _{006}	Switzerland Denise Feierabend; Luana Flütsch; Wendy Holdener; Luca Aerni; Marc Gini; Reto Schmidiger	United States Julia Mancuso; Mikaela Shiffrin; David Chodounsky; Tim Jitloff	Austria Eva-Maria Brem; Michaela Kirchgasser; Bernadette Schild; Manuel Feller; Philipp Schörghofer	

== Men's standings ==
=== Overall ===
Pos.	Athlete	SÖL (Austria)	LEV (Finland)	LKL (Canada)		BCR (United States)			ISÈ (France)		VGA (Italy)		ABD (Italy)	BOR (Italy)		ADE (Switzerland)		WEN (Switzerland)			KIT (Austria)				SCH (Austria)	STM (Switzerland)	KVI (Norway)			KRG (Slovenia)		LEN (Switzerland)				Pts
Pos.	Athlete	GS	SL	DH	SG	DH	SG	GS	GS	SL	SG	DH	GS	DH	SL	GS	SL	SC	DH	SL	SL	DH	SG	SC	SL	GS	DH	DH	SG	GS	SL	DH	SG	GS	SL	Pts
1	(Austria) Hirscher	3	1				16	3	1	41			1		2	3	1			3	23†		56	3	2	2				4	5		12	4	1	1222
2	(Norway) Svindal	4		4	1	1	7	11	DNF1		1	4	13	1		12		5	3			2	3	DNF2		DNF2	5	6	4	17		5	16	DNF1		1091
3	(France) Pinturault	2	DNF2				18	5	4	DNF1			2		DSQ1	4	23	2		1	4		18	1	5	3				18	8		1	2	9	1028
4	(United States) Ligety	1	11		DNF	42	5	1	DNF1	39	DNF		3		27	DNF2	DNF2	1		48	15		31	2	DNF1	1				1	16	2	5	1	12	991
5	(Germany) Neureuther	DNF2	27					7		10			5		1	1	DNF2			2	1				3					12	1			3	2	813
6	(Norway) Jansrud			21	11	12	9	17			4	2	DNF1	34		DNF1	DNF1	21	13			9	11	10		13	1	5	1	DNF2		12	8	DNS1		657
7	(Norway) Kristoffersen	32	3						9	14			12		7	13	3			15	2				1	12				3	3			8	11	639
8	(United States) Miller	19		16	23	13	14	2	DNF1	DNF1	8	5	40	35		DNF1	49	9	5	26		3	2	DSQ2	DSQ1	DNF1	16	8	12	24		8	3	15	DNF2	633
9	(Austria) Mayer			13	2	DNF	10	DNF1			DNF	14	DNF1	5				8	6			11	13	14		22	DNF	3	3	DNF1		1	4	20		602
10	(Switzerland) Küng			15	5	5	1				DNF	6		13					1			14	17	DNS2			12	12	2			11	15			562
Pos.	Athlete	GS	SL	DH	SG	DH	SG	GS	GS	SL	SG	DH	GS	DH	SL	GS	SL	SC	DH	SL	SL	DH	SG	SC	SL	GS	DH	DH	SG	GS	SL	DH	SG	GS	SL	Pts
Pos.	Athlete	SÖL (Austria)	LEV (Finland)	LKL (Canada)		BCR (United States)			ISÈ (France)		VGA (Italy)		ABD (Italy)	BOR (Italy)		ADE (Switzerland)		WEN (Switzerland)			KIT (Austria)				SCH (Austria)	STM (Switzerland)	KVI (Norway)			KRG (Slovenia)		LEN (Switzerland)				Pts

Colour	Result
Gold	Winner
Silver	2nd place
Bronze	3rd place
Green	Points finish
Blue	Non-points finish
Purple	Did not finish (DNF)
Black	Disqualified (DSQ)
White	Did not start (DNS)

**Bold** – Best time in 1st run
Italics – Best time in 2nd run

† - Athletes finished the race, but didn't take points as they completed over 108% of the winner's total race time.

=== Downhill ===
Rank	**after all 9 races**	Points
**1**	(Norway) **Aksel Lund Svindal**	570
2	(Austria) Hannes Reichelt	360
3	(Canada) Erik Guay	357
4	(Norway) Kjetil Jansrud	328
5	(Switzerland) Patrick Küng	307
5	(Austria) Matthias Mayer	307

=== Super-G ===
Rank	**after all 6 races**	Points
**1**	(Norway) **Aksel Lund Svindal**	346
2	(Norway) Kjetil Jansrud	259
3	(Switzerland) Patrick Küng	255
4	(Austria) Matthias Mayer	236
5	(United States) Bode Miller	220

=== Giant slalom ===
Rank	**after all 8 races**	Points
**1**	(United States) **Ted Ligety**	560
2	(Austria) Marcel Hirscher	560
3	(France) Alexis Pinturault	458
4	(France) Thomas Fanara	278
5	(Germany) Felix Neureuther	263

=== Slalom ===
Rank	**after all 9 races**	Points
**1**	(Austria) **Marcel Hirscher**	565
2	(Germany) Felix Neureuther	550
3	(Norway) Henrik Kristoffersen	454
4	(Italy) Patrick Thaler	351
5	(Sweden) Mattias Hargin	349

=== Super combined ===
Rank	**after all 2 races**	Points
**1**	(United States) **Ted Ligety** (no trophy) (Note: Crystal globes were not officially awarded in the discipline, in 2014.)	180
**1**	(France) **Alexis Pinturault** (no trophy)	180
3	(France) Thomas Mermillod-Blondin	90
4	(Switzerland) Sandro Viletta	86
5	(Croatia) Natko Zrnčić-Dim	70

== Women's standings ==
=== Overall ===
Pos.	Athlete	SÖL (Austria)	LEV (Finland)	BCR (United States)			LKL (Canada)			STM (Switzerland)		COU (France)	ISÈ (France)		LIE (Austria)		BOR (Italy)	ZAU (Austria)		FLA (Austria)	COR (Italy)				KRG (Slovenia)	CMN (Switzerland)	ÅRE (Sweden)			LEN (Switzerland)				Pts
Pos.	Athlete	GS	SL	DH	SG	GS	DH	DH	SG	SG	GS	SL	DH	GS	GS	SL	SL	DH	SC	SL	SG	DH	DH	SG	SL	DH	GS	GS	SL	DH	SG	SL	GS	Pts
1	(Austria) Fenninger	4		5	2	DNF2	4	3	3	3	8		11	7	1			2	8		5	6	5	8		2	1	1		6	2		1	1371
2	(Germany) Höfl-Riesch	DNF1	2	7	8	5	1	1	19	8	11	DNF1	9	5	15	3	DNF2	3	3	4	2	1	4	3	23	9	21	10	7	DNF				1180
3	(Switzerland) Gut	1		1	1	DNF1	10	13	1	7	DNF1		25	2	DNF1			11	15		19	4	10	1		DNF	3	DNF1	36	1	1	DNF1	5	1101
4	(Slovenia) Maze	18	3	16	14	11	6	6	13	DNF1	3	17	2	11	14	15	24	12	6	12	6	7	1	5	DSQ2	3	5	DNF2	9	15	3	DNS1	16	964
5	(Liechtenstein) Weirather	5		2	DNF	3	DSQ	2	2	1	DNF1		4	1	17			4	2		2													943
6	(United States) Shiffrin	6	1			2					DNF1	12		8	3	2	1			1					7		15	24	1			1	12	895
7	(Sweden) Pietilä-Holmner	7	20			4					6	DNF1		3	7	DNF2	2			3					5		8	5	2			8	6	647
8	(Austria) Görgl	22		15	DSQ	19	14	10	4	4	DNF1		10	32	43			1	11		1	DNF	14	6		4	19	22		2	DNF		17	640
9	(Austria) Hosp		13	24	3		DNF		12	5		13				14	14	5	4	6	3	39	19	10	11	11			11	13	DNF	6		575
10	(Sweden) Hansdotter	24	8			24					DNF1	2		DNF1	DNF1	6	10			2					1		24	26	4			2	13	534
Pos.	Athlete	GS	SL	DH	SG	GS	DH	DH	SG	SG	GS	SL	DH	GS	GS	SL	SL	DH	SC	SL	SG	DH	DH	SG	SL	DH	GS	GS	SL	DH	SG	SL	GS	Pts
Pos.	Athlete	SÖL (Austria)	LEV (Finland)	BCR (United States)			LKL (Canada)			STM (Switzerland)		COU (France)	ISÈ (France)		LIE (Austria)		BOR (Italy)	ZAU (Austria)		FLA (Austria)	COR (Italy)				KRG (Slovenia)	CMN (Switzerland)	ÅRE (Sweden)			LEN (Switzerland)				Pts

Colour	Result
Gold	Winner
Silver	2nd place
Bronze	3rd place
Green	Points finish
Blue	Non-points finish
Purple	Did not finish (DNF)
Black	Disqualified (DSQ)
White	Did not start (DNS)

**Bold** – Best time in 1st run
Italics – Best time in 2nd run

=== Downhill ===
Rank	**after all 9 races**	Points
**1**	(Germany) **Maria Höfl-Riesch**	504
2	(Austria) Anna Fenninger	464
3	(Slovenia) Tina Maze	409
4	(Liechtenstein) Tina Weirather	400
5	(Switzerland) Marianne Kaufmann-Abderhalden	389

=== Super-G ===
Rank	**after all 6 races**	Points
**1**	(Switzerland) **Lara Gut**	448
2	(Austria) Anna Fenninger	357
3	(Liechtenstein) Tina Weirather	310
4	(Austria) Elisabeth Görgl	240
5	(Germany) Maria Höfl-Riesch	216

=== Giant slalom ===
Rank	**after all 8 races**	Points
**1**	(Austria) **Anna Fenninger**	518
2.	(Sweden) Jessica Lindell-Vikarby	492
3.	(Sweden) Maria Pietilä-Holmner	339
4.	(Switzerland) Lara Gut	285
5.	(Austria) Kathrin Zettel	284

=== Slalom ===
Rank	**after all 8 races**	Points
**1**	(United States) **Mikaela Shiffrin**	638
2	(Sweden) Frida Hansdotter	488
3	(Austria) Marlies Schild	385
4	(Sweden) Maria Pietilä-Holmner	308
5	(Germany) Maria Höfl-Riesch	234

=== Super combined ===
Rank	**after 1 race**	Points
**1**	**(Canada)** Marie-Michèle Gagnon	100
2	(Austria) Michaela Kirchgasser	80
3	(Germany) Maria Höfl-Riesch	60
4	(Austria) Nicole Hosp	50
5	(Sweden) Sara Hector	45

== Nations Cup ==
=== Overall ===
Rank	after all 68 races	Points
1	Austria	11489
2	Switzerland	5773
3	Italy	5335
4	France	4825
5	United States	4801

=== Men ===
Rank	after all 34 races	Points
1	Austria	5393
2	France	3689
3	Italy	3253
4	Norway	2955
5	United States	2780

=== Women ===
Rank	after all 32 races	Points
1	Austria	6096
2	Switzerland	3356
3	Sweden	2938
4	Italy	2082
5	Germany	2029
