= Tiiu Nurmberg =

Estonian-Canadian alpine skier (born 1982)

Tiiu Nurmberg (born 5 January 1982 in Pointe-Claire, Canada) is a former Canadian alpine skier of Estonian descent, who represented Estonia at the 2006 and 2010 Winter Olympics.

Her best place in the Olympics was 34th in giant slalom in 2006 Winter Olympics.

She ended her career on 14 April 2010.
