= Vera Yeremenko =

Kazakhstani alpine skier (born 1983)

Personal information
- Nationality: Kazakhstani
- Born: 13 July 1983 (age 41); Almaty, Kazakhstan

Sport
- Sport: Alpine skiing

Vera Yeremenko (born 13 July 1983) is a Kazakhstani alpine skier. She competed in two events at the 2006 Winter Olympics.
