= Mami Sekizuka =

Japanese alpine skier (born 1985)

Personal information
- Nationality: Japanese
- Born: 11 June 1985 (age 39); Shinano, Nagano, Japan

Sport
- Sport: Alpine skiing

Mami Sekizuka (関塚 真美, Sekizuka Mami, born 11 June 1985) is a Japanese alpine skier. She competed in the women's slalom at the 2006 Winter Olympics.
