= Eva Hučková =

Slovak skier (born 1988)

Personal information
- Nationality: Slovak
- Born: 18 November 1988 (age 36); Banská Bystrica, Czechoslovakia

Sport
- Sport: Alpine skiing

Eva Hučková (born 18 November 1988) is a Slovak alpine skier. She competed in five events at the 2006 Winter Olympics.
