= Soňa Maculová =

Slovak alpine skier (born 1987)

Personal information
- Nationality: Slovak
- Born: 20 May 1987 (age 37); Krompachy, Czechoslovakia

Sport
- Sport: Alpine skiing

Soňa Maculová (born 20 May 1987) is a Slovak alpine skier. She competed in five events at the 2006 Winter Olympics.
