= Estelle Alphand =

Swedish-French alpine skier (born 1995)

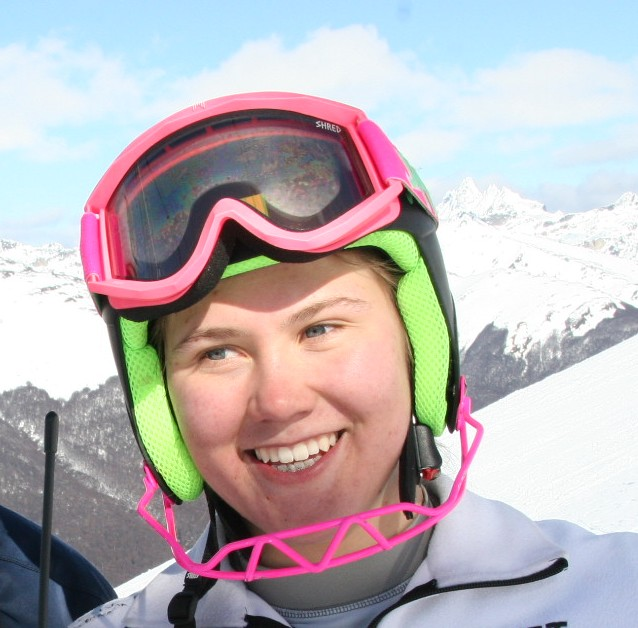
- Estelle Alphand in Ushuaia, Argentina in October 2011

Personal information
- Full name: Estelle Erika Ainee Alphand
- Born: 23 April 1995 (age 31) Briançon, France
- Height: 1.71 m (5 ft 7 in)
- Family: Luc Alphand (father); Nils Alphand (brother)

Skiing career
- Country: Sweden (since 2017); France (2011-2017)
- Sport: Alpine skiing
- Club: Åre SLK
- Disciplines: Slalom, giant slalom, super-G, downhill
- World Cup debut: 9 March 2013 (age 17)

Olympics
- Teams: 2 – (2018, 2026)
- Medals: 0

World Championships
- Teams: 4 – (2021–2025)
- Medals: 2 (0 gold)

World Cup
- Seasons: 14 – (2013–2026)
- Podiums: 0 – (33rd in 2018)
- Overall titles: 0 – (19th in GS, 2018 & 2025)
Medal record
Women's alpine skiing
Representing Sweden
World Championships
Silver medal – second place	2021 Cortina d’Ampezzo	Team event
Bronze medal – third place	2025 Saalbach	Team event
Representing France
Youth Olympics
Gold medal – first place	2012 Innsbruck	Super-G
Silver medal – second place	2012 Innsbruck	Giant Slalom
Silver medal – second place	2012 Innsbruck	Alpine Combined

Estelle Erika Ainee Alphand (born 23 April 1995) is a French-born Swedish alpine skier, who competes in all events. She was born in Briançon, France, and is the daughter of former alpine skier and rally driver Luc Alphand. She has represented Sweden since the beginning of the 2018 season, having previously competed for France.

== Biography ==
Alphand, whose mother Anna-Karin is Swedish, began competing in her first FIS races at the age of 15. In January 2011, she won her first competition at this level: an alpine combined in Tignes, France. A month later, she made her World Junior Championships debut. In February 2011, she entered the European Cup, concluding her first season by becoming the French junior slalom champion. At the first Youth Winter Olympic Games in February 2012 in Innsbruck, Alphand won three medals: gold in super-G and silver in both giant slalom and super combined.

During the following two winters, Alphand mostly competed in the European cup, where she first appeared on the podium after a super combined in Kvitfjell in December 2012. Her first appearance in the World Cup was in a giant slalom in Ofterschwang in March 2013. Her best result in the World Junior Championships was when she finished in 4th place in the downhill in Lillehammer in 2015. Alphand won her first World Cup points on 24 November 2015, finishing 21st in a giant slalom in Aspen.

During the 2016–2017 season Alphand reached World Cup points only once, after which she fell out of the French national team. She then asked the French federation to allow her to compete for Sweden instead. After short negotiations, she left France and has been a member of the Swedish team since the 2018 season. Changing teams proved to be a good decision and Alphand soon advanced to starting positions at top-30 in both slalom and giant slalom. On 28 December 2017 she was 5th in the World Cup slalom of Lienz, and thereby reached her best World Cup finish.

While representing Sweden at the FIS Alpine World Ski Championships 2021, she was part of the Swedish team that earned a silver medal in the combined men's and women's team competition.

== World Cup results ==
=== Season standings ===
Season
Season	Age	Overall	Slalom	Giant slalom	Super-G	Downhill	Combined	Parallel
2016	20	98	—	41	—	—	47	—N/a
2017	21	114	—	46	—	—	—	—N/a
2018	22	33	21	19	—	—	—	—N/a
2019	23	102	45	—	—	—	—	—N/a
2020	24	58	43	20	—	—	—	20
2021	25	100	—	53	47	—	—N/a	—
2022	26	79	—	34	—	—	—N/a	21
2023	27	68	—	25	—	—	—N/a	—N/a
2024	28	83	44	42	—	—	—N/a	—N/a
2025	29	47	34	19	—	—	—N/a	—N/a
2026	32	54	36	23	—	—	—N/a	—N/a

=== Top-ten finishes ===
- 0 podiums; 7 top tens

Season
Season	Date	Location	Discipline	Place
2018	28 December 2017	Lienz, Austria	Slalom	5th
2018	6 January 2018	Kranjska Gora, Slovenia	Giant slalom	10th
2018	7 January 2018	Kranjska Gora, Slovenia	Slalom	8th
2018	23 January 2018	Kronplatz, Italy	Giant slalom	7th
2020	15 December 2019	St. Moritz, Switzerland	Pararllel slalom	9th
2025	25 March 2025	Sun Valley, United States	Giant slalom	9th
2026	6 December 2025	Tremblant, Canada	Giant slalom	7th

== World Championship results ==
Season
Season	Age	Slalom	Giant slalom	Super-G	Downhill	Combined	Team combined	Parallel	Team event
2021	25	—	24	31	—	DNF2	—N/a	13	2
2023	27	—	26	—	—	—	—N/a	16	—
2025	29	—	20	—	—	—N/a	—	—N/a	3

== Olympic results ==
Season
Season	Age	Slalom	Giant slalom	Super-G	Downhill	Combined	Team combined
2018	22	DNF2	16	—	—	—	—N/a
2026	30	—	27	—	—	—N/a	—
