= Michelle Gisin =

Swiss alpine skier (born 1993)

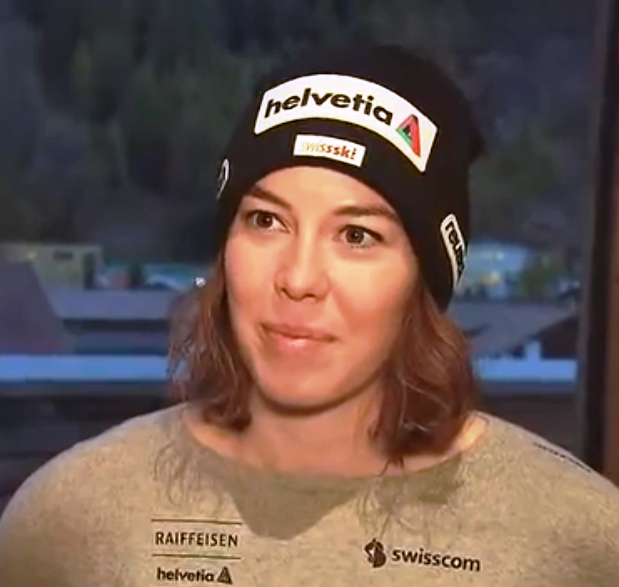
- Gisin in 2019

Personal information
- Born: 5 December 1993 (age 32) Samedan, Graubünden, Switzerland
- Height: 1.74 m (5 ft 9 in)

Skiing career
- Sport: Alpine skiing
- Disciplines: Slalom, combined, Downhill, super-G, Giant slalom
- World Cup debut: 29 December 2012 (age 19)

Olympics
- Teams: 3 – (2014, 2018, 2022)
- Medals: 3 (2 gold)

World Championships
- Teams: 6 – (2013–2025)
- Medals: 2 (0 gold)

World Cup
- Seasons: 13 – (2013–2025)
- Wins: 1 – (1 SL)
- Podiums: 21 – (9 SL, 4 DH, 3 GS, 3 SG, 2 AC)
- Overall titles: 0 – (3rd in 2021)
- Discipline titles: 0 – (2nd in AC, 2018)
Medal record
Women's alpine skiing
Representing Switzerland
World Cup race podiums
Event	1st	2nd	3rd
Slalom	1	1	7
Giant slalom	0	1	2
Super-G	0	1	2
Downhill	0	1	3
Combined	0	2	0
Total	1	6	14
International competitions
Event	1st	2nd	3rd
Olympic Games	2	0	1
World Championships	0	1	1
Total	2	1	2
Olympic Games
Gold medal – first place	2018 Pyeongchang	Combined
Gold medal – first place	2022 Beijing	Combined
Bronze medal – third place	2022 Beijing	Super-G
World Championships
Silver medal – second place	2017 St. Moritz	Combined
Bronze medal – third place	2021 Cortina d'Ampezzo	Combined
Junior World Championships
Silver medal – second place	2013 Mont St. Anne	Slalom

Michelle Gisin (German pronunciation: ['miʃel gɪzɪn]; born 5 December 1993) is a Swiss World Cup former alpine ski racer who competed in all disciplines. A two-time Olympic gold medalist, she won the combined in 2018 and successfully defended in 2022. Born in Samedan, Graubünden, Gisin is the younger sister of alpine ski racers Marc and Dominique Gisin.

== Career ==
Gisin has enjoyed success in the Swiss Junior National Championships, finishing third in the downhill in 2011, third in the super-G in 2012 and winning the super combined in 2012. She took a silver medal in the slalom at the FIS Junior World Ski Championships in February 2013. She competed for Switzerland at the 2014 Winter Olympics in the alpine skiing events.

She made a breakthrough at the senior level at a World Cup meeting in Val-d'Isère just before Christmas 2016: she took seventh place in her first World Cup start in downhill and took her first podium finish when she finished second in the combined. Later that season at the World Championships in St. Moritz, Gisin took a silver medal in the combined, finishing behind teammate Wendy Holdener in a one-two finish for the Swiss on home snow.

In December 2017, during her first visit to Lake Louise, Gisin took eighth place in the first of two downhills at the Canadian resort before taking her second World Cup podium in the second downhill the following day, finishing in third. The following week she made a successful return to St. Moritz when she took her first top 10 finish in a super-G, benefiting from an improvement in weather conditions to again finish second as part of a Swiss one-two, this time finishing 0.1 seconds behind Jasmine Flury. She went on to take the gold medal in the combined at the 2018 Winter Olympics, finishing third in the first run of downhill before holding off Mikaela Shiffrin and Holdener in the slalom leg to take the win, following in the footsteps of her sister, who won a gold medal in downhill in the 2014 Games.

Gisin's preparation for the 2021/22 season proved very difficult as she was ill with Pfeiffer's glandular fever in the summer and fall and had to refrain almost completely from training during this time. Despite this significant handicap, she was able to improve continuously throughout the winter and was already back on the podium at the end of December 2021 as the third-place finisher in the Courchevel giant slalom and the Lienz slalom. In January, two more third places were added in the downhill and super-G of Cortina d'Ampezzo. At the 2022 Winter Olympics in Beijing, she won the bronze medal in the giant slalom before repeating her Olympic victory in the combined. Two more third places in the World Cup were added in the slalom of Åre and the super-G of Courchevel.

On 3 November 2026, Gisin announced her retirement, nearly a year after a training crash in St. Moritz that required surgery on her neck, wrist and knee and caused her to miss the 2026 Winter Olympics.

== Personal life ==
Gisin has been in a relationship with Italian alpine skier Luca De Aliprandini since 2014. They announced their engagement in June 2024.

== World Cup results ==
=== Season standings ===
Season
Season	Age	Overall	Slalom	Giant slalom	Super-G	Downhill	Combined	Parallel
2013	19	79	35	—	—	—	—	—N/a
2014	20	82	31	—	—	—	—	—N/a
2015	21	45	18	38	—	—	—	—N/a
2016	22	44	14	—	—	—	21	—N/a
2017	23	27	16	—	41	28	5	—N/a
2018	24	7	13	50	4	6	2	—N/a
2019	25	16	14	37	24	9	—	—N/a
2020	26	8	8	11	17	24	8	—
2021	27	3	4	4	13	15	—N/a	—
2022	28	5	7	8	12	16	—N/a	—
2023	29	13	18	28	9	19	—N/a	—N/a
2024	30	8	4	25	14	21	—N/a	—N/a
2025	31	34	32	35	22	19	—N/a	—N/a

Standings through 24 February 2024

=== Race podiums ===
- 1 win – (1 SL)
- 21 podiums – (9 SL, 4 DH, 3 GS, 3 SG, 2 AC); 113 top tens

Season
Season	Date	Location	Discipline	Place
2017	16 December 2016	Val d'Isere, France	Combined	2nd
2018	2 December 2017	Lake Louise, Canada	Downhill	3rd
2018	9 December 2017	St. Moritz, Switzerland	Super-G	2nd
2018	4 March 2018	Crans-Montana, Switzerland	Combined	2nd
2019	30 November 2018	Lake Louise, Canada	Downhill	2nd
2019	1 December 2018	Lake Louise, Canada	Downhill	3rd
2020	29 December 2019	Lienz, Austria	Slalom	3rd
2020	11 January 2020	Altenmarkt, Austria	Downhill	3rd
2021	22 November 2020	Levi, Finland	Slalom	2nd
2021	29 December 2020	Semmering, Austria	Slalom	1st
2021	3 January 2021	Zagreb, Croatia	Slalom	3rd
2021	16 January 2021	Kranjska Gora, Slovenia	Giant slalom	3rd
2021	17 January 2021	Kranjska Gora, Slovenia	Giant slalom	2nd
2021	20 March 2021	Lenzerheide, Switzerland	Slalom	3rd
2022	21 December 2021	Courchevel, France	Giant slalom	3rd
2022	29 December 2021	Lienz, Austria	Slalom	3rd
2022	22 January 2022	Cortina d'Ampezzo, Italy	Super-G	3rd
2022	12 March 2022	Åre, Sweden	Slalom	3rd
2022	17 March 2022	Courchevel, France	Super-G	3rd
2024	29 December 2023	Lienz, Austria	Slalom	3rd
2024	10 March 2024	Åre, Sweden	Slalom	3rd

== World Championship results ==
Year
Year	Age	Slalom	Giant slalom	Super-G	Downhill	Combined	Team; Combined	Parallel	Team; Event
2013	19	26	—	—	—	—	—N/a	—N/a	9
2015	21	DNF2	32	—	—	—	—N/a	—N/a	4
2017	23	21	—	—	8	2	—N/a	—N/a	—
2019	25	Injured: did not compete					—N/a	—N/a	
2021	27	DNF1	11	8	5	3	—N/a	—	—
2023	29	DNS2	28	10	—	6	—N/a	—	—
2025	31	—	26	17	—	—N/a	—	—N/a	—

== Olympic results ==
Year
Year	Age	Slalom	Giant slalom	Super-G	Downhill	Combined	Team Event
2014	20	28	—	—	—	—	—N/a
2018	24	16	—	9	8	1	—
2022	28	6	10	3	—	1	—

== See also ==
- List of Olympic medalist families
