= Mélanie Meillard =

Swiss alpine skier (born 1998)

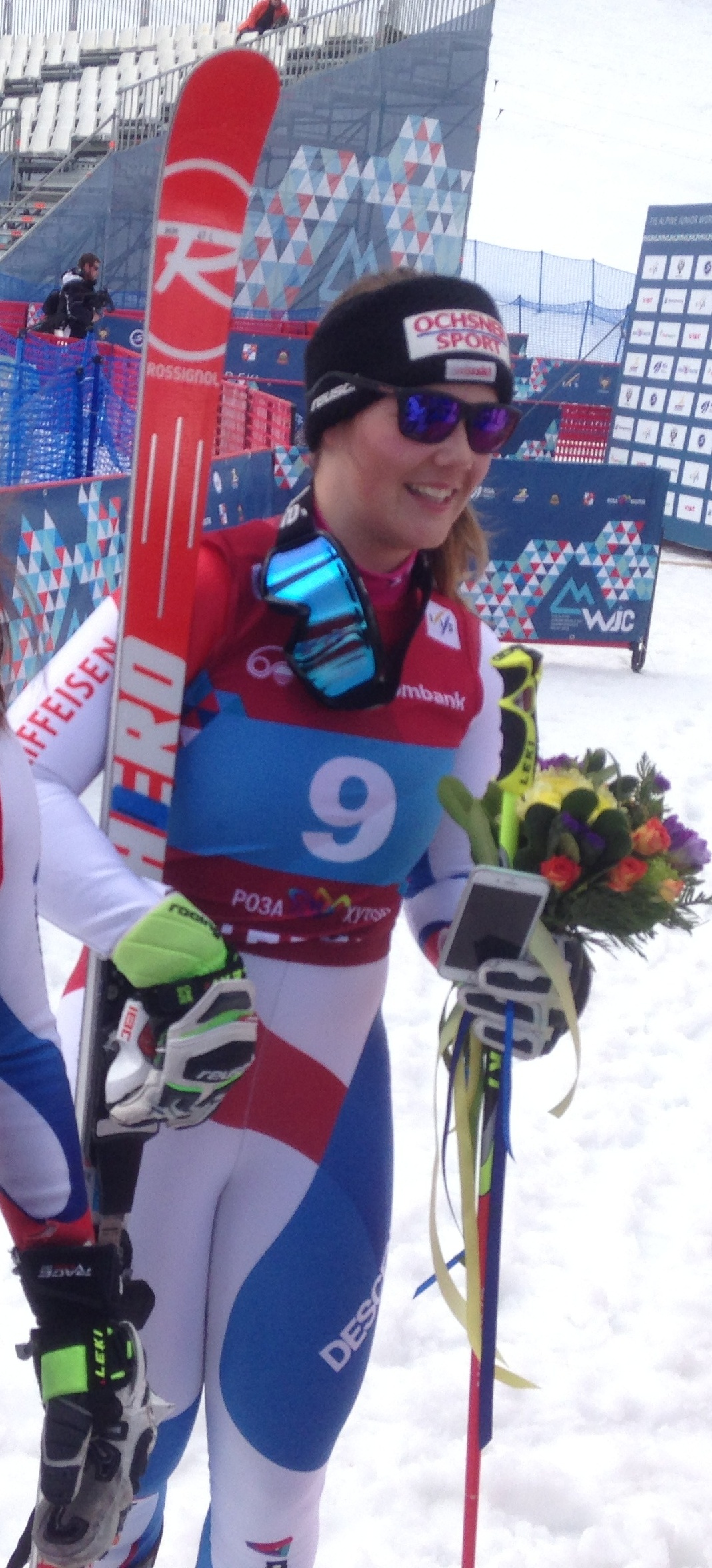
- Meillard in 2016

Personal information
- Born: 23 September 1998 (age 27) Neuchâtel, Switzerland
- Height: 1.71 m (5 ft 7 in)
- Family: Loïc Meillard (brother)
- Website: melaniemeillard.ch

Skiing career
- Country: Switzerland
- Sport: Alpine skiing
- Club: Heremencia
- Disciplines: Slalom, giant slalom
- World Cup debut: 13 December 2015 (age 17)

Olympics
- Teams: 1 – (2026)
- Medals: 0

World Championships
- Teams: 3 – (2017, 2021, 2025)
- Medals: 0

World Cup
- Seasons: 10 – (2016–2018, 2020–2026)
- Wins: 0
- Podiums: 1 – (1 PS)
- Overall titles: 0 – (19th in 2018)
- Discipline titles: 0 – (8th in SL, 2018 & 2025)

Mélanie Meillard (born 23 September 1998) is a Swiss World Cup alpine ski racer, who specialises in the technical events of slalom and giant slalom. Meillard made her World Cup debut at age 17 in December 2015. Her older brother Loïc is also a World Cup alpine racer.

In December 2019 and January 2020, Meillard attempted a comeback, but ended the season after three races without a countable result. She finally managed to return to the top of the world at the beginning of the 2020–2021 season, when she finished ninth in the Levi slalom. At the end of the season, she was able to win the Swiss championship title in the slalom for the second time after 2017 at the end of March. In the giant slalom she finished in 3rd place.

== World Cup results ==
=== Season standings ===
Season
Season	Age	Overall	Slalom	Giant slalom	Super-G	Downhill	Combined	Parallel
2017	18	29	10	20	—	—	—	—N/a
2018	19	19	8	16	—	—	—	—N/a
2019	20	injured; did not compete						—N/a
2020	21	no World Cup points earned						
2021	22	60	25	35	—	—	—N/a	—
2022	23	89	34	—	—	—	—N/a	—
2023	24	69	28	—	—	—	—N/a	—N/a
2024	25	38	14	36	—	—	—N/a	—N/a
2025	26	26	8	—	—	—	—N/a	—N/a
2026	27	55	16	—	—	—	—N/a	—N/a

=== Top-five finishes ===
- 0 wins
- 1 podium – (1 PS), 10 top fives, 28 top tens

Season
Season	Date	Location	Discipline	Place
2017	31 January 2017	Stockholm, Sweden	Parallel slalom	5th
2017	18 March 2017	Aspen, United States	Slalom	5th
2018	11 November 2017	Levi, Finland	Slalom	5th
2018	1 January 2018	Oslo, Norway	Parallel slalom	3rd
2018	28 January 2018	Lenzerheide, Switzerland	Slalom	4th
2024	21 January 2024	Jasná, Slovakia	Slalom	5th
2025	1 December 2024	Killington, United States	Slalom	5th
2025	5 January 2025	Kranjska Gora, Slovenia	Slalom	5th
2025	14 January 2025	Flachau, Austria	Slalom	5th

== World Championship results ==
Year
Year	Age	Slalom	Giant slalom	Super-G	Downhill	Combined	Team combined	Parallel	Team event
2017	18	DSQ1	13	—	—	—	—N/a	—N/a	—
2021	22	DNF2	—	—	—	—	—N/a	—	—
2025	26	DNF2	—	—	—	—N/a	15	—N/a	—

== Olympic results ==
Year
Year	Age	Slalom	Giant slalom	Super-G	Downhill	Team combined
2026	27	7	—	—	—	DNF2
