= Federica Brignone =

Italian alpine skier (born 1990)

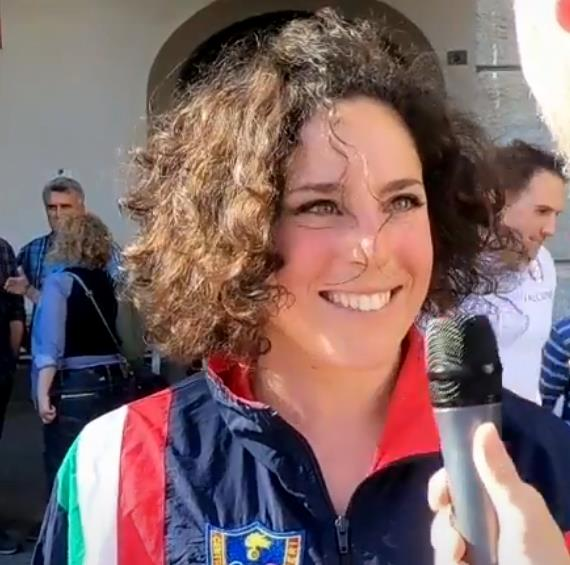
- Brignone in 2018 in Aosta

Personal information
- Nicknames: Tigre delle Nevi; Freccia di La Salle
- Born: 14 July 1990 (age 36) Milan, Lombardy, Italy
- Height: 1.68 m (5 ft 6 in)
- Website: federicabrignone.com

Skiing career
- Country: Italy
- Sport: Alpine skiing
- Club: CS Carabinieri
- Disciplines: Giant slalom, super-G, combined, downhill, slalom
- World Cup debut: 28 December 2007 (age 17)

Olympics
- Teams: 5 – (2010–2026)
- Medals: 5 (2 gold)

World Championships
- Teams: 7 – (2011, 2015–2025)
- Medals: 5 (2 gold)

World Cup
- Seasons: 19 – (2008–2026)
- Wins: 37 – (17 GS, 13 SG, 5 AC, 2 DH)
- Podiums: 85 – (42 GS, 27 SG, 10 DH, 6 AC)
- Overall titles: 2 – (2020, 2025)
- Discipline titles: 5 – (GS – 2020, 2025; AC – 2020; SG – 2022; DH – 2025)
Medal record
Women's alpine skiing
Representing Italy
World Cup race podiums
Event	1st	2nd	3rd
Giant slalom	17	15	10
Super-G	13	6	8
Downhill	2	5	3
Combined	5	1	0
Total	37	27	21
International competitions
Event	1st	2nd	3rd
Olympic Games	2	1	2
World Championships	2	3	0
Total	4	4	2
Olympic Games
Gold medal – first place	2026 Milano Cortina	Super-G
Gold medal – first place	2026 Milano Cortina	Giant slalom
Silver medal – second place	2022 Beijing	Giant slalom
Bronze medal – third place	2018 Pyeongchang	Giant slalom
Bronze medal – third place	2022 Beijing	Combined
World Championships
Gold medal – first place	2023 Méribel	Combined
Gold medal – first place	2025 Saalbach	Giant slalom
Silver medal – second place	2011 Garmisch-Partenkirchen	Giant slalom
Silver medal – second place	2023 Méribel	Giant slalom
Silver medal – second place	2025 Saalbach	Super-G
Junior World Championships
Gold medal – first place	2009 Garmisch-Partenkirchen	Combined
Silver medal – second place	2010 Mont Blanc	Giant slalom
- Updated on 15 February 2026

Federica Brignone (Italian pronunciation: [fedeˈriːka briɲˈɲoːne]; born 14 July 1990) is an Italian World Cup alpine ski racer, who is the current Olympic champion in giant slalom and super-G, as well as world champion in giant slalom.

Brignone has competed in all alpine disciplines, with a focus on giant slalom, super-G and, more recently, downhill. Brignone won the World Cup overall title in 2020, becoming the first Italian female to achieve this feat, and again in 2025, as well as five discipline titles between 2020 and 2025. She has won 37 World Cup races, five Olympic medals and five World Championships medals. At the 2022 Winter Olympics, she won a silver medal in giant slalom and a bronze in combined. At the 2025 World Championships, she won a gold medal in giant slalom and a silver medal in super-G. After a severe injury in April 2025, she made a comeback just before the 2026 Winter Olympics, during which she won gold medals both in giant slalom and super-G, becoming the Italian female alpine skier to have won the most Olympic medals (five), as well as the only Italian alpine skier to have won two gold medals in the same edition of the Olympic Games along with Alberto Tomba.

== Ski racing ==
Brignone made her World Cup debut at the age of 17 in December 2007, during the 2007–08 season, and 2009–10 was her first full season on the World Cup circuit. At the 2011 World Championships in Garmisch-Partenkirchen, her first, Brignone won the silver medal in giant slalom. In December 2012, Brignone underwent surgery on her right ankle to remove a bothersome cyst, and missed the rest of the 2012–13 season.

In the 2015–16 season, Brignone won her first two World Cup races. During the 2016–2017 finals in Aspen, Brignone led an Italian podium sweep in giant slalom, with teammates Sofia Goggia and Marta Bassino, ending the season with three victories. Brignone was part of two other hat tricks by Italy, both in downhill: as runner-up at Bad Kleinkirchheim in 2018, and a third place at Bansko in 2020.

At the 2018 Winter Olympics in PyeongChang Brignone won her first Olympic medal: the bronze in giant slalom.

In the 2019–20 season, Brignone won the overall crystal globe, ahead of Mikaela Shiffrin, who had not ran since January due to her father's death, and Petra Vlhová, becoming the first and to date only Italian woman to win the World Cup overall title. With five wins and eleven podiums during the season, she added two more globes for the giant slalom and combined titles.

Brignone won two medals at the 2022 Winter Olympics in Beijing: silver in giant slalom and bronze in combined.

At the 2023 World Championships in Courchevel–Méribel she won the gold medal in combined, and the silver medal in giant slalom. In the following 2023–24 season, she won six races – her best tally up to that point.

At the 2025 World Championships in Saalbach Brignone won the gold medal in giant slalom and silver in super-G. During the 2024–25 season, she won ten races – her best tally ever – including her two first downhill victories, and the overall, the downhill, and the giant slalom titles.

In April 2025, in the giant slalom race of the Italian ski championships in Moena, Fassa Valley, Brignone sustained serious injuries in a crash. A CT scan revealed multiple fractures of the calf and tibial plateau, as well as a tear of her left anterior cruciate ligament, that would force her to miss most of the 2025–26 season. In October 2025, she was awarded as Athlete of the Year by the Italian Winter Sports Federation.

In January 2026 Brignone returned to World Cup racing. Subsequently, she participated in the 2026 Winter Olympics in Milan and Cortina d'Ampezzo, where, at the Olimpia delle Tofane ski course, she won gold medals in giant slalom and super-G.

== Personal life ==
Born in Milan, Lombardy, and raised in Aosta Valley, Brignone is the daughter of Maria Rosa Quario (b. 1961), an alpine racer who, in the late 1970s and early 1980s, earned four World Cup wins and fifteen podiums, all in slalom.

Brignone lives in La Salle, Aosta Valley.

She was engaged to French skier Nicolas Raffort.

== World Cup results ==
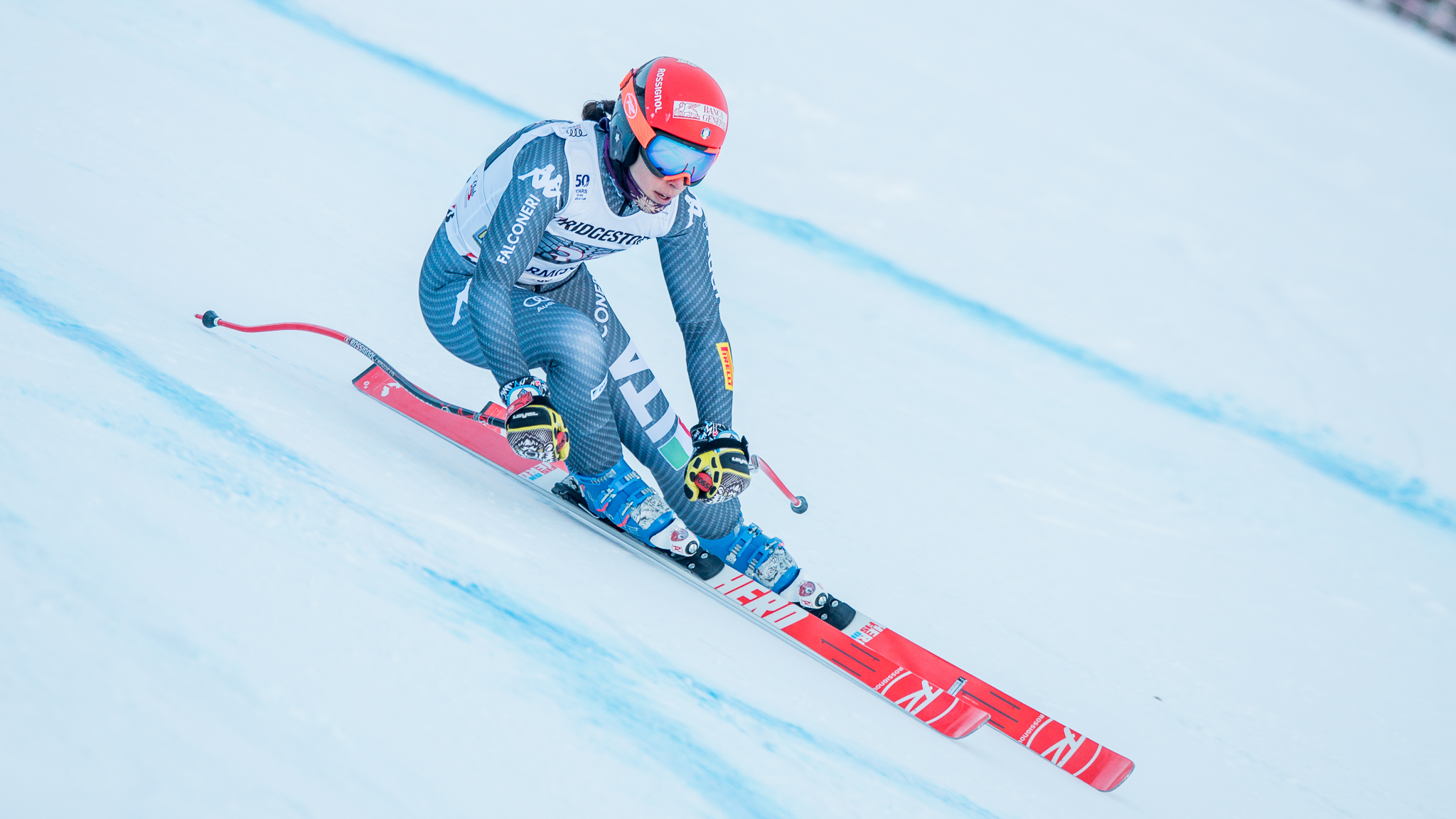
Brignone during Garmisch-Partenkirchen Kandahar downhill in 2017

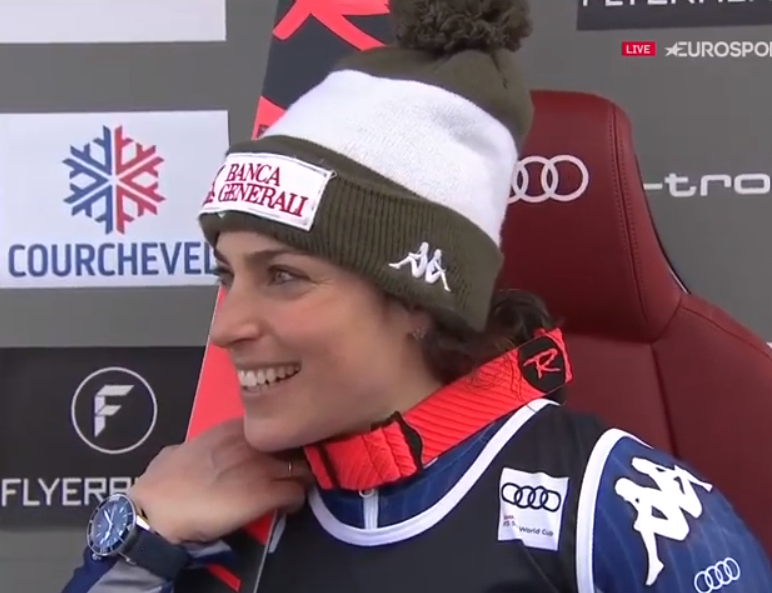
Brignone the day of her victory in World Cup's Giant slalom of Courchevel in 2019.

=== Season titles ===
- 7 titles – (2 Overall, 2 GS, 1 AC, 1 SG, 1 DH)

Season	
Season	Discipline
2020	Overall
2020	Giant slalom
2020	Combined
2022	Super-G
2025	Overall
2025	Downhill
2025	Giant slalom

=== Season standings ===
Season
Season	Age	Overall	Slalom	Giant slalom	Super-G	Downhill	Combined	Parallel
2010	19	43	—	12	—	—	—	—N/a
2011	20	26	—	5	44	—	36	—N/a
2012	21	20	55	6	49	—	20	—N/a
2013	22	103	—	—	—	—	30	—N/a
2014	23	31	50	9	—	—	—	—N/a
2015	24	20	39	7	17	—	—	—N/a
2016	25	8	39	4	6	43	17	—N/a
2017	26	5	46	4	8	27	2nd place, silver medalist(s)	—N/a
2018	27	11	50	5	6	24	3rd place, bronze medalist(s)	—N/a
2019	28	6	39	5	8	21	1st place, gold medalist(s)	—N/a
2020	29	1st place, gold medalist(s)	36	1st place, gold medalist(s)	2nd place, silver medalist(s)	3rd place, bronze medalist(s)	1st place, gold medalist(s)	3rd place, bronze medalist(s)
2021	30	7	28	5	2nd place, silver medalist(s)	19	—N/a	7
2022	31	3rd place, bronze medalist(s)	38	6	1st place, gold medalist(s)	14	—N/a	—
2023	32	4	48	5	2nd place, silver medalist(s)	14	—N/a	—N/a
2024	33	2nd place, silver medalist(s)	54	2nd place, silver medalist(s)	2nd place, silver medalist(s)	5	—N/a	—N/a
2025	34	1st place, gold medalist(s)	—	1st place, gold medalist(s)	2nd place, silver medalist(s)	1st place, gold medalist(s)	—N/a	—N/a
2026	35	62	—	34	26	—	—N/a	—N/a

=== Race victories ===
	Total	Slalom	Giant slalom	Super-G	Downhill	Combined	Parallel
Wins	37	—	17	13	2	5	—
Podiums	85	—	42	27	10	6	—

Season
Season	Date	Location	Discipline
2016	24 October 2015	Sölden, Austria	Giant slalom
2016	27 February 2016	Soldeu, Andorra	Super-G
2017	24 January 2017	Kronplatz, Italy	Giant slalom
2017	24 February 2017	Crans-Montana, Switzerland	Combined
2017	19 March 2017	Aspen, United States	Giant slalom
2018	29 December 2017	Lienz, Austria	Giant slalom
2018	13 January 2018	Bad Kleinkirchheim, Austria	Super-G
2018	4 March 2018	Crans-Montana, Switzerland	Combined
2019	24 November 2018	Killington, United States	Giant slalom
2019	24 February 2019	Crans-Montana, Switzerland	Combined
2020; 5 victories (2 GS, 2 AC, 1 SG)	17 December 2019	Courchevel, France	Giant slalom
2020; 5 victories (2 GS, 2 AC, 1 SG)	12 January 2020	Altenmarkt-Zauchensee, Austria	Combined
2020; 5 victories (2 GS, 2 AC, 1 SG)	18 January 2020	Sestriere, Italy	Giant slalom
2020; 5 victories (2 GS, 2 AC, 1 SG)	2 February 2020	Rosa Khutor, Russia	Super-G
2020; 5 victories (2 GS, 2 AC, 1 SG)	23 February 2020	Crans-Montana, Switzerland	Combined
2021	28 February 2021	Val di Fassa, Italy	Super-G
2022; 4 victories (3 SG, 1 GS)	12 December 2021	St. Moritz, Switzerland	Super-G
2022; 4 victories (3 SG, 1 GS)	16 January 2022	Altenmarkt-Zauchensee, Austria	Super-G
2022; 4 victories (3 SG, 1 GS)	30 January 2022	Garmisch-Partenkirchen, Germany	Super-G
2022; 4 victories (3 SG, 1 GS)	20 March 2022	Méribel, France	Giant slalom
2023	14 January 2023	St. Anton, Austria	Super-G
2024; 6 victories (4 GS, 2 SG)	2 December 2023	Tremblant, Canada	Giant slalom
2024; 6 victories (4 GS, 2 SG)	3 December 2023	Tremblant, Canada	Giant slalom
2024; 6 victories (4 GS, 2 SG)	17 December 2023	Val-d'Isère, France	Super-G
2024; 6 victories (4 GS, 2 SG)	3 March 2024	Kvitfjell, Norway	Super-G
2024; 6 victories (4 GS, 2 SG)	9 March 2024	Åre, Sweden	Giant slalom
2024; 6 victories (4 GS, 2 SG)	17 March 2024	Saalbach, Austria	Giant slalom
2025; 10 victories (5 GS, 3 SG, 2 DH)	26 October 2024	Sölden, Austria	Giant slalom
2025; 10 victories (5 GS, 3 SG, 2 DH)	28 December 2024	Semmering, Austria	Giant slalom
2025; 10 victories (5 GS, 3 SG, 2 DH)	11 January 2025	St. Anton, Austria	Downhill
2025; 10 victories (5 GS, 3 SG, 2 DH)	19 January 2025	Cortina d'Ampezzo, Italy	Super-G
2025; 10 victories (5 GS, 3 SG, 2 DH)	25 January 2025	Garmisch-Partenkirchen, Germany	Downhill
2025; 10 victories (5 GS, 3 SG, 2 DH)	21 February 2025	Sestriere, Italy	Giant slalom
2025; 10 victories (5 GS, 3 SG, 2 DH)	22 February 2025	Sestriere, Italy	Giant slalom
2025; 10 victories (5 GS, 3 SG, 2 DH)	2 March 2025	Kvitfjell, Norway	Super-G
2025; 10 victories (5 GS, 3 SG, 2 DH)	8 March 2025	Åre, Sweden	Giant slalom
2025; 10 victories (5 GS, 3 SG, 2 DH)	14 March 2025	La Thuile, Italy	Super-G

=== Podiums ===
Season	Podiums															
Season	Downhill			Super-G			Giant slalom			Combined			Total			
Season	1st place, gold medalist(s)	2nd place, silver medalist(s)	3rd place, bronze medalist(s)	1st place, gold medalist(s)	2nd place, silver medalist(s)	3rd place, bronze medalist(s)	1st place, gold medalist(s)	2nd place, silver medalist(s)	3rd place, bronze medalist(s)	1st place, gold medalist(s)	2nd place, silver medalist(s)	3rd place, bronze medalist(s)	1st place, gold medalist(s)	2nd place, silver medalist(s)	3rd place, bronze medalist(s)	Σ
2010									1				0	0	1	1
2011								1					0	1	0	1
2012								3	1				0	3	1	4
2013													0	0	0	0
2014													0	0	0	0
2015									1				0	0	1	1
2016				1			1		4				2	0	4	6
2017						1	2	1		1	1		3	2	1	6
2018		1		1			1		1	1			3	1	1	5
2019						1	1	1		1			2	1	1	4
2020		2	1	1	2		2	1		2			5	5	1	11
2021				1		2		2					1	2	2	5
2022				3			1	1					4	1	0	5
2023		1		1	2			2	1				1	5	1	7
2024		1	1	2	2		4	2	1				6	5	2	13
2025	2		1	3		4	5	1					10	1	5	16
2026													0	0	0	0
Total	2	5	3	13	6	8	17	15	10	5	1	0	37	26	21	85
Total	10			28			42			6			85			85

== World Championship results ==
Year
Year	Age	Slalom	Giant slalom	Super-G	Downhill	Combined
2011	20	DNF1	2	—	—	—
2013	22	Injured: did not compete				
2015	24	19	DNF1	—	—	—
2017	26	24	4	8	—	7
2019	28	—	5	10	—	6
2021	30	DNF1	DNF1	10	—	DNF2
2023	32	—	2	8	—	1
2025	34	—	1	2	10	—N/a

== Olympic results ==
Year
Year	Age	Slalom	Giant slalom	Super-G	Downhill	Combined	Team combined	Team event
2010	19	—	18	—	—	—	—N/a	—N/a
2014	23	DNF2	DNF1	—	—	11	—N/a	—N/a
2018	27	—	3	6	DNF	8	—N/a	5
2022	31	DNF2	2	7	—	3	—N/a	8
2026	35	—	1	1	10	—N/a	—	—N/a

== National titles ==
Brignone has won nine national championships in individual events at senior level.

- Italian Alpine Ski Championships
  - Super-G: 2017, 2023 (2)
  - Giant slalom: 2011, 2017, 2018 (3)
  - Slalom: 2021 (1)
  - Combined: 2016, 2017, 2023 (3)

== See also ==
- List of FIS Alpine Ski World Cup women's race winners
- Italian female skiers most successful World Cup race winner

Awards
Preceded by Federica Pellegrini	Italian Sportswoman of the Year; 2020	Succeeded by Antonella Palmisano
