= Jasmine Flury =

Swiss alpine skier (born 1993)

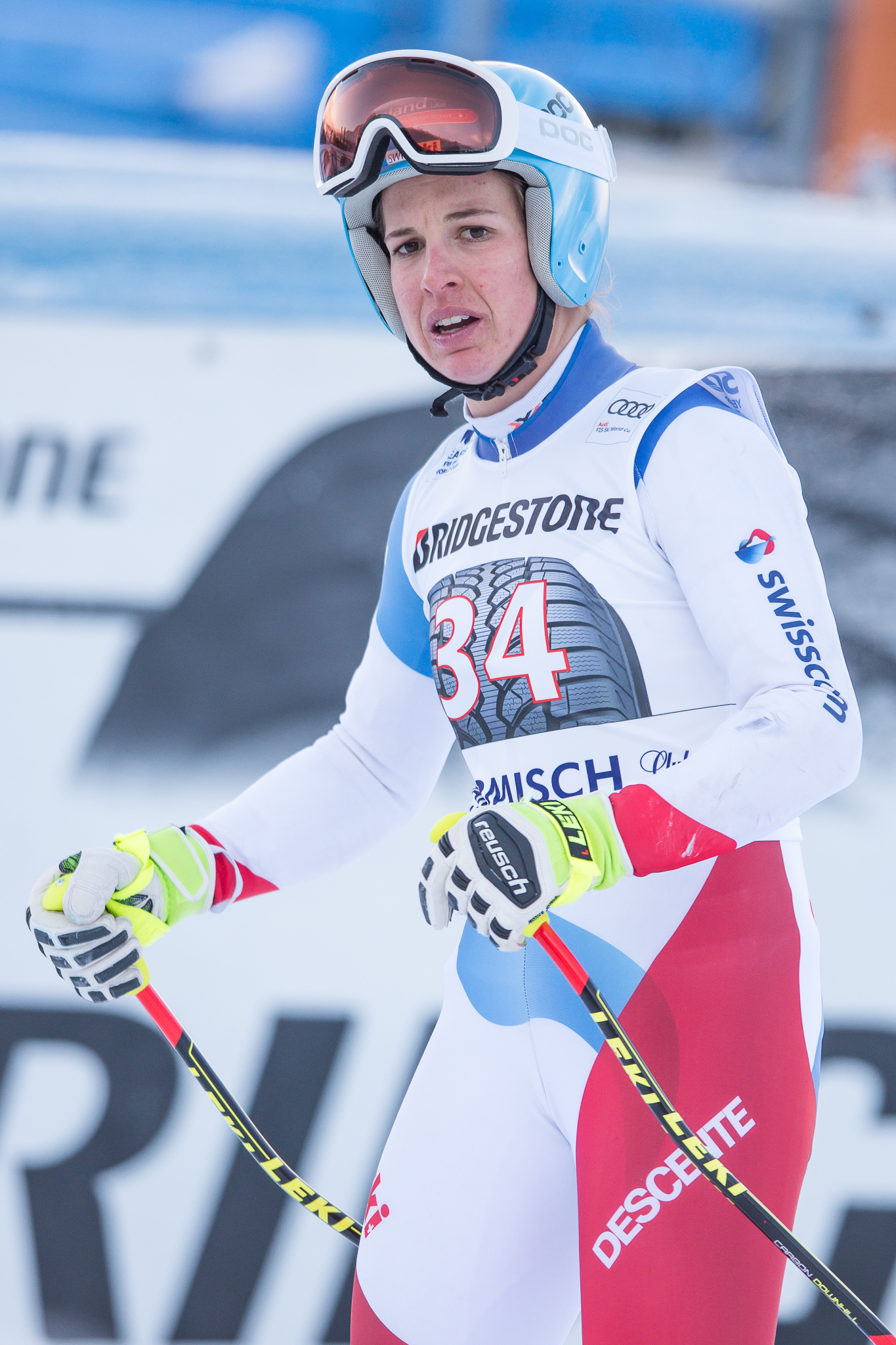
- Flury at Garmisch-Partenkirchen in 2017

Personal information
- Born: 16 September 1993 (age 32) Saas im Prättigau, Grisons, Switzerland
- Height: 1.65 m (5 ft 5 in)

Skiing career
- Country: Switzerland
- Sport: Alpine skiing
- Club: Rinerhorn
- Disciplines: Downhill, Super-G
- World Cup debut: 11 January 2014 (age 20)

Olympics
- Teams: 3 – (2018, 2022, 2026)
- Medals: 0

World Championships
- Teams: 3 – (2017, 2019, 2023)
- Medals: 1 (1 gold)

World Cup
- Seasons: 11 – (2014–2015, 2017–2024, 2026)
- Wins: 2 – (1 DH, 1 SG)
- Podiums: 4 – (3 DH, 1 SG)
- Overall titles: 0 – (24th in 2018)
- Discipline titles: 0 – (6th in DH, 2024)
Medal record
Women's alpine skiing
Representing Switzerland
World Championships
Gold medal – first place	2023 Méribel	Downhill

Jasmine Flury (born 16 September 1993) is a Swiss World Cup alpine ski racer, specializing in the speed events of downhill and super-G. She won gold in downhill at the 2023 World Championships.

Flury made her World Cup debut at age twenty in January 2014, and her first podium was a victory on home country snow, in a super-G at St. Moritz in December 2017. She has competed in three World Championships and three Winter Olympics.

== World Cup results ==
Flury made her World Cup debut at age twenty in a downhill at Altenmarkt in January 2014, but had only one additional start that season, with over twenty on the European Cup circuit. The next season she had eight World Cup starts but went without a top thirty result, and concurrently raced in European Cup events. A hip injury kept her out of the 2016 season.

=== Season standings ===
Season
Season	Age	Overall	Slalom	Giant slalom	Super-G	Downhill	Combined
2017	23	42	—	—	22	21	—
2018	24	24	—	—	13	15	—
2019	25	29	—	—	10	19	—
2020	26	66	—	—	29	34	—
2021	27	35	—	—	32	13	—N/a
2022	28	26	—	—	15	17	—N/a
2023	29	28	—	—	16	15	—N/a
2024	30	26	—	—	22	6	—N/a
2025	31	injured, did not compete					—N/a
2026	32	69	—	—	44	25	—N/a

=== Race podiums ===
- 2 wins – (1 DH, 1 SG)
- 4 podiums – (3 DH, 1 SG); 29 top tens (16 DH, 13 SG)

Season
Season	Date	Location	Discipline	Place
2018	9 December 2017	St. Moritz, Switzerland	Super-G	1st
2022	29 January 2022	Garmisch-Partenkirchen, Germany	Downhill	2nd
2024	16 December 2023	Val-d'Isère, France	Downhill	1st
2024	16 February 2024	Crans-Montana, Switzerland	Downhill	2nd

== World Championship results ==
Year
Year	Age	Slalom	Giant slalom	Super-G	Downhill	Combined
2017	23	—	—	17	12	—
2019	25	—	—	DNF	20	DNS2
2023	29	—	—	22	1	—

== Olympic results ==
Year
Year	Age	Slalom	Giant slalom	Super-G	Downhill	Combined	Team combined
2018	24	—	—	27	DNF	—	—N/a
2022	28	—	—	12	15	—	—N/a
2026	32	—	—	—	18	—N/a	6
