= Viktoria Rebensburg =

German alpine skier

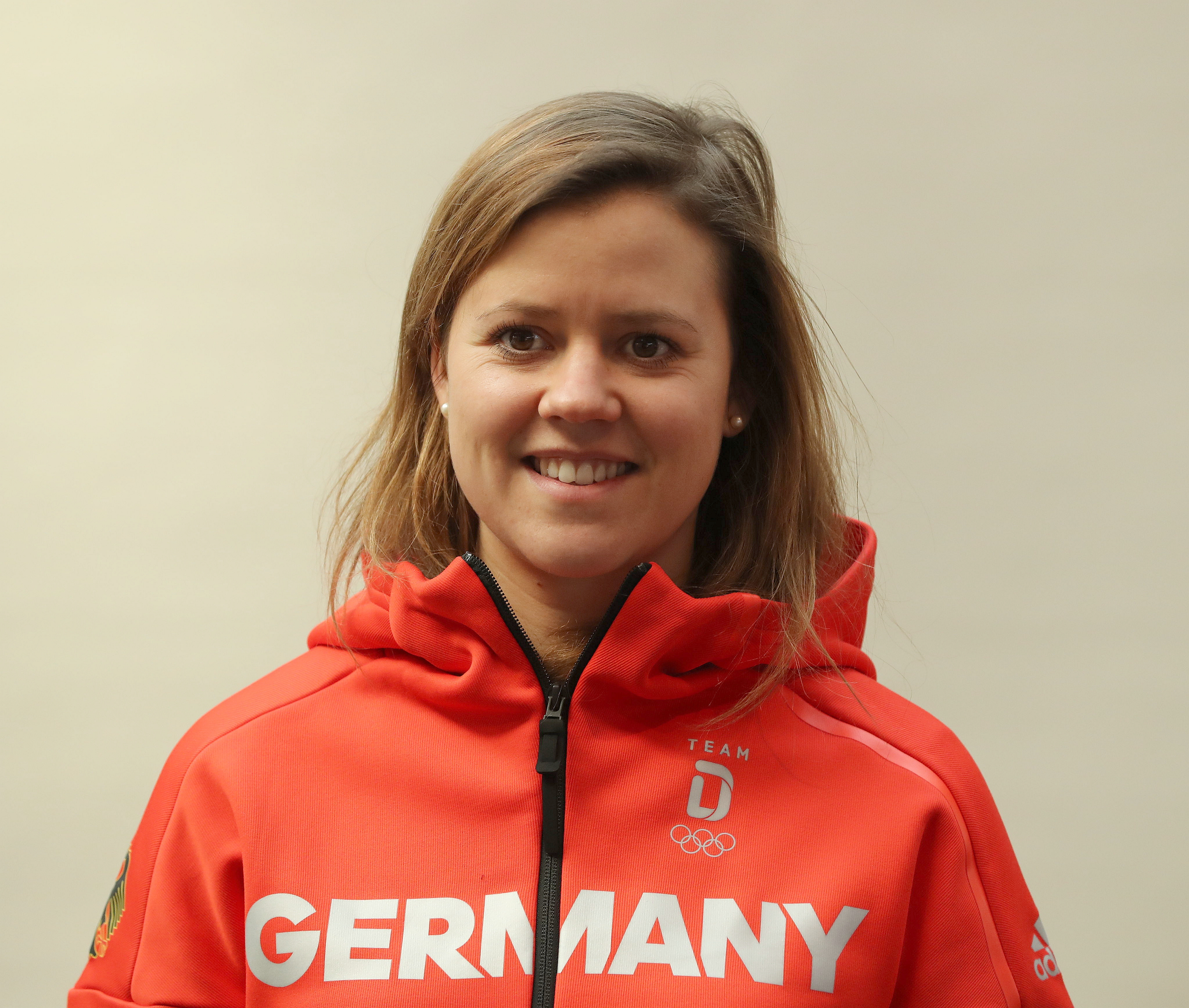
- Rebensburg in January 2018

Personal information
- Born: 4 October 1989 (age 36) Tegernsee, Bavaria, West Germany
- Height: 1.69 m (5 ft 7 in)
- Website: viktoria-rebensburg.com

Skiing career
- Country: Germany
- Sport: Alpine skiing
- Club: SC Kreuth
- Retired: 1 September 2020 (age 30)
- Disciplines: Giant slalom, super-G, downhill
- World Cup debut: 15 December 2006 (age 17)

Olympics
- Teams: 3 – (2010, 2014, 2018)
- Medals: 2 (1 gold)

World Championships
- Teams: 7 – (2007–2019)
- Medals: 2 (0 gold)

World Cup
- Seasons: 14 – (2007–2020)
- Wins: 19 – (14 GS, 4 SG, 1 DH)
- Podiums: 49 – (34 GS, 8 SG, 7 DH)
- Overall titles: 0 – (3rd in 2016, 2018)
- Discipline titles: 3 – (GS: 2011, 2012, 2018)
Medal record
Women's alpine skiing
Representing Germany
World Cup race podiums
Event	1st	2nd	3rd
Giant slalom	14	13	7
Downhill	1	3	3
Super-G	4	2	2
Total	19	18	12
International competitions
Event	1st	2nd	3rd
Olympic Games	1	0	1
World Championships	0	2	0
Total	1	2	1
Olympic Games
Gold medal – first place	2010 Vancouver	Giant slalom
Bronze medal – third place	2014 Sochi	Giant slalom
World Championships
Silver medal – second place	2015 Vail/Beaver Creek	Giant slalom
Silver medal – second place	2019 Åre	Giant slalom
Junior World Championships
Gold medal – first place	2008 Formigal	Super-G
Gold medal – first place	2009 Garmisch	Super-G
Gold medal – first place	2009 Garmisch	Giant slalom
Silver medal – second place	2008 Formigal	Giant slalom
Bronze medal – third place	2008 Formigal	Downhill

Viktoria Rebensburg (born 4 October 1989) is a German retired World Cup alpine ski racer and the 2010 Olympic gold medalist in the giant slalom. Born in Tegernsee, Bavaria, she has three World Cup season titles, all in giant slalom.

== Career ==
After finishing 28th in the Olympic super-G, she won gold in the giant slalom, her first victory in international competition. Her previous best finish was second place at a GS a month earlier, her only World Cup podium.

Eight months later, Rebensburg won her first World Cup race in October 2010, a giant slalom in the season opener at Sölden, Austria. She won two more GS races during the 2011 season and took the giant slalom season title; she finished eighth in the overall standings, won by teammate Maria Riesch. In the 2012 season she won five races – four GS and one super-G – and went on to defend the GS season title.

On home snow in Bavaria for speed events at Garmisch-Partenkirchen in February 2020, Rebensburg won the downhill, her sole World Cup victory in that discipline and nineteenth overall. The following day in the super-G, she crashed and was injured, ending her season.

On 1 September 2020, Rebensburg announced her retirement from competition due to an unsuccessful comeback after recent injuries.

== World Cup results ==
=== Season titles ===
- 3 titles – (3 GS)

Season
Season	Discipline
2011	Giant slalom
2012	Giant slalom
2018	Giant slalom

=== Season standings ===
Season
Season	Age	Overall	Slalom	Giant slalom	Super G	Downhill	Combined	Parallel
2007	17	83	—	25	—	—	—	not run
2008	18	56	—	16	49	—	—	not run
2009	19	43	—	18	29	—	—	not run
2010	20	16	—	4	21	28	—	not run
2011	21	8	—	1	10	23	—	9
2012	22	7	—	1	19	11	—	9
2013	23	6	—	3	6	23	—	10
2014	24	19	—	12	14	30	—	awarded with SL
2015	25	11	—	9	13	8	—	awarded with SL
2016	26	3	—	2	5	7	—	awarded with SL
2017	27	9	—	7	11	7	—	awarded with SL
2018	28	3	—	1	11	7	—	awarded with SL
2019	29	4	—	4	4	12	—	awarded with SL
2020	30	9	—	10	9	10	—	42

From seasons 2011 to 2013, Parallel standing shows standings for city event.
From seasons 2014 to 2019, parallel disciplines are included in slalom and giant slalom standings.

=== Race victories ===
- 19 wins – (14 GS, 4 SG, 1 DH)
- 49 podiums – (34 GS, 8 SG, 7 DH), 133 top tens

Season
Season	Date	Location	Discipline
2011	23 October 2010	Sölden, Austria	Giant slalom
2011	6 February 2011	Zwiesel, Germany	Giant slalom
2011	11 March 2011	(Czech Republic) Špindlerův Mlýn, Czech Republic	Giant slalom
2012	26 November 2011	(United States) Aspen, USA	Giant slalom
2012	2 March 2012	Ofterschwang, Germany	Giant slalom
2012	3 March 2012	Ofterschwang, Germany	Giant slalom
2012	15 March 2012	Schladming, Austria	Super-G
2012	18 March 2012	Schladming, Austria	Giant slalom
2013	19 December 2012	Åre, Sweden	Giant slalom
2013	20 January 2013	Cortina d'Ampezzo, Italy	Super-G
2016	17 January 2016	Flachau, Austria	Giant slalom
2016	30 January 2016	Maribor, Slovenia	Giant slalom
2016	20 March 2016	St. Moritz, Switzerland	Giant slalom
2018	28 October 2017	Sölden, Austria	Giant slalom
2018	25 November 2017	(United States) Killington, USA	Giant slalom
2018	23 January 2018	Kronplatz, Italy	Giant slalom
2019	14 March 2019	Soldeu, Andorra	Super-G
2020	8 December 2019	Lake Louise, Canada	Super-G
2020	8 February 2020	Garmisch-Partenkirchen, Germany	Downhill

== World Championship results ==
Year
Year	Age	Slalom	Giant slalom	Super G	Downhill	Combined
2007	17	—	8	—	—	—
2009	19	—	9	10	—	—
2011	21	—	5	DNS	—	—
2013	23	—	11	8	—	—
2015	25	—	2	5	10	—
2017	27	—	DNF1	4	11	—
2019	29	—	2	4	11	—

== Olympic results ==
Year
Year	Age	Slalom	Giant slalom	Super G	Downhill	Combined
2010	20	—	1	28	—	—
2014	24	—	3	9	15	—
2018	28	—	4	10	9	—
