= Lara Gut-Behrami =

Swiss alpine skier (born 1991)

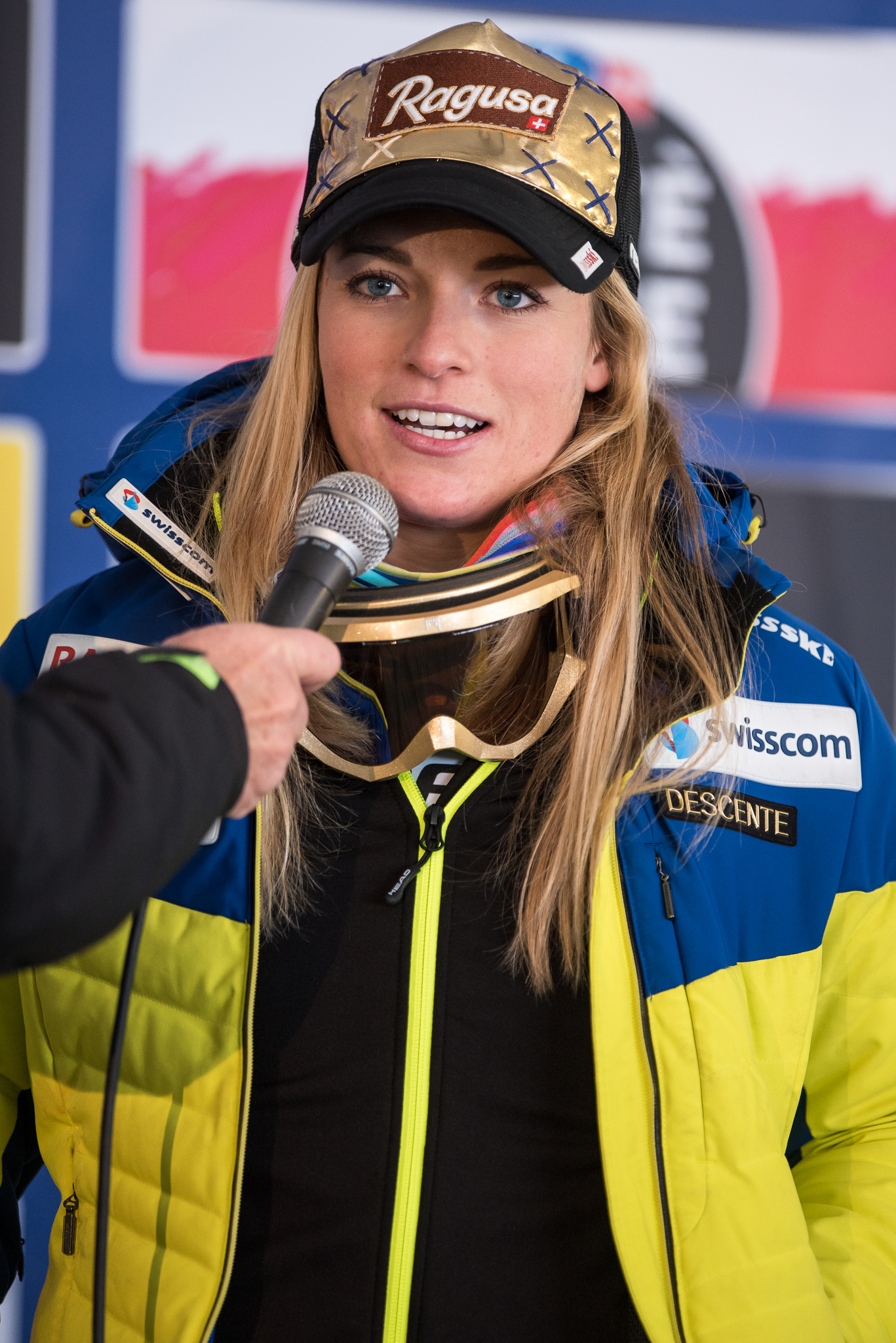
- Gut-Behrami in 2017

Personal information
- Born: Lara Gut; 27 April 1991 (age 35) Sorengo, Ticino, Switzerland
- Height: 1.60 m (5 ft 3 in)
- Spouse: Valon Behrami
- Website: laragut.ch

Skiing career
- Country: Switzerland
- Sport: Alpine skiing
- Club: Sporting Gottardo
- Disciplines: Downhill, super-G, giant slalom, combined
- World Cup debut: 28 December 2007 (age 16)

Olympics
- Teams: 3 – (2014, 2018, 2022)
- Medals: 3 (1 gold)

World Championships
- Teams: 9 – (2009–2025)
- Medals: 9 (2 gold)

World Cup
- Seasons: 18 – (2008–2009, 2011–2026)
- Wins: 48 – (24 SG, 13 DH, 10 GS, 1 AC)
- Podiums: 101 – (45 SG, 24 DH, 29 GS, 2 AC, 1 PG)
- Overall titles: 2 – (2016, 2024)
- Discipline titles: 7 – (SG – 2014, 2016, 2021, 2023, 2024, 2025, GS – 2024)
Medal record
Women's alpine skiing
Representing Switzerland
World Cup race podiums
Event	1st	2nd	3rd
Giant slalom	10	10	9
Downhill	13	5	6
Super-G	24	13	8
Combined	1	0	1
Parallel	0	0	1
Total	48	28	25
International competitions
Event	1st	2nd	3rd
Olympic Games	1	0	2
World Championships	2	4	3
Total	3	4	5
Olympic Games
Gold medal – first place	2022 Beijing	Super-G
Bronze medal – third place	2014 Sochi	Downhill
Bronze medal – third place	2022 Beijing	Giant slalom
World Championships
Gold medal – first place	2021 Cortina d'Ampezzo	Super-G
Gold medal – first place	2021 Cortina d'Ampezzo	Giant slalom
Silver medal – second place	2009 Val-d'Isère	Downhill
Silver medal – second place	2009 Val-d'Isère	Combined
Silver medal – second place	2013 Schladming	Super-G
Silver medal – second place	2025 Saalbach	Team combined
Bronze medal – third place	2015 Beaver Creek	Downhill
Bronze medal – third place	2017 St. Moritz	Super-G
Bronze medal – third place	2021 Cortina d'Ampezzo	Downhill
Junior World Championships
Silver medal – second place	2007 Altenmarkt	Downhill
Silver medal – second place	2008 Formigal	Downhill

Lara Gut-Behrami (née Gut; Italian pronunciation: [ˈlaːra ˈɡut]; born 27 April 1991) is a retired Swiss World Cup alpine ski racer who competed in all disciplines and specialized in the speed events of downhill and Super-G. She won the gold medal in the super-G event at the 2022 Winter Olympics in Beijing. With 48 World Cup victories to her name across 3 disciplines, she is one of the all-time greats in Alpine skiing history. She is the first woman with at least ten World Cup victories in three different disciplines. With six Super-G globes, which is an overall record, 24 World Cup victories and both an olympic and world championships gold medal, she can be considered the most successful alpine skier in Super-G of all time.

== Career ==
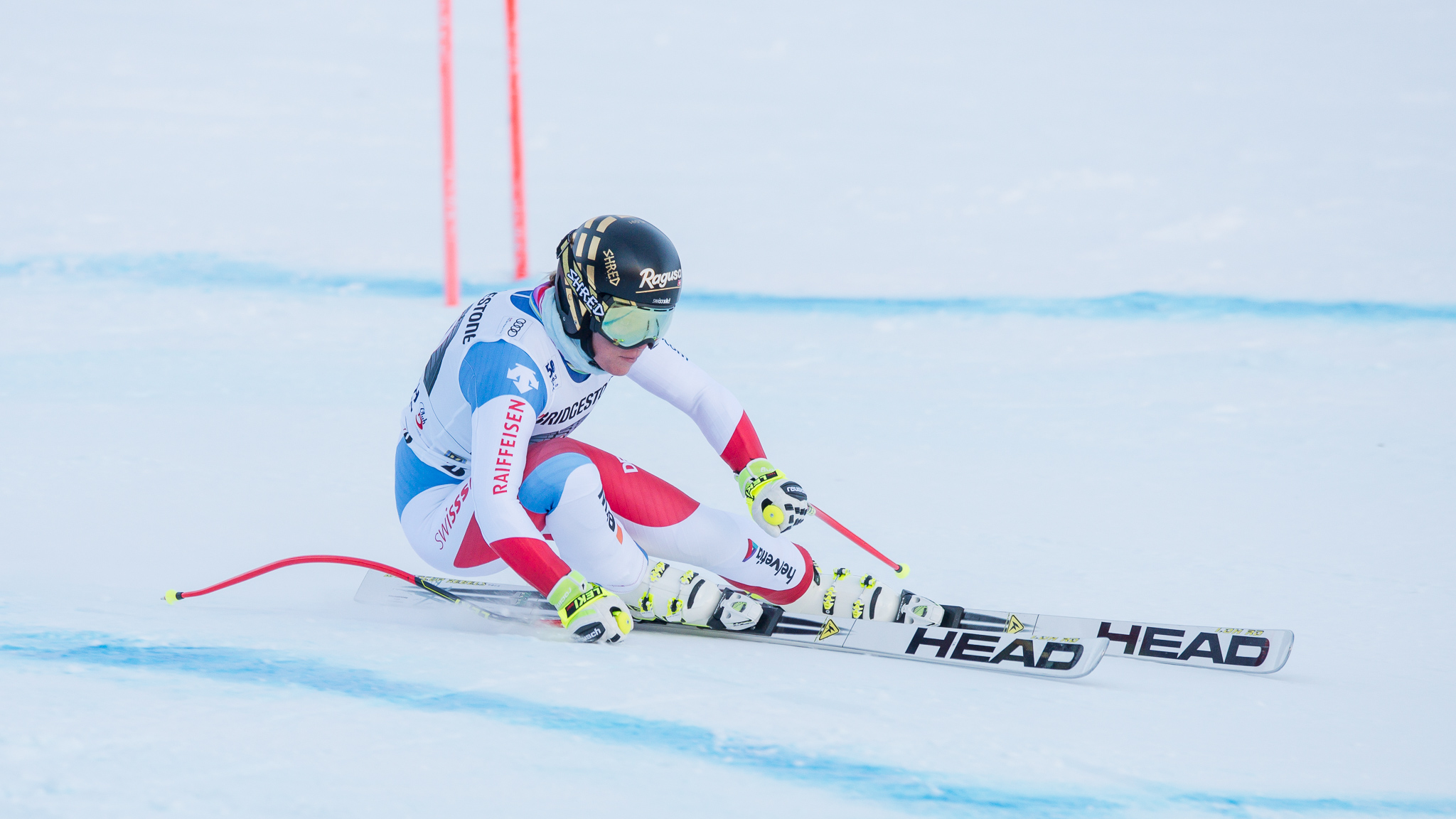
Gut in downhill at Garmisch-Partenkirchen in January 2017

Gut was born in Sorengo, Ticino; her father, Pauli Gut, is Swiss from Airolo, and her mother, Gabriella Almici, a masseuse, was born in Zone, Lombardy. Gut participated in her first FIS races at age 15 in December 2006. At the Alpine Youth World Championship 2007 at Altenmarkt, Austria, she won silver in downhill. In the same year, she became the Swiss national champion in super-G, the second youngest champion of all time. In the 2007 season, Gut finished second in the downhill standings of the Europa Cup.

In late December 2007, Gut made her World Cup debut in a giant slalom at Lienz, Austria. In January 2008, at Caspoggio, she won four consecutive Europa Cup races. At her first World Cup downhill race on 2 February 2008, Gut made the podium in third place at St. Moritz, despite falling on the finishing pitch and sliding on her back through the finish line, she finished only 0.35 seconds behind the winner. She followed her World Cup speed debut with a fifth-place finish in the super-G the next day. Following the 2008 season, Gut was moved up to the World Cup team for the 2009 season.

Early in her first full season, Gut won her first World Cup race on 20 December 2008, a super-G in St. Moritz, finishing 0.63 seconds ahead of runner-up Fabienne Suter. Gut became the youngest skier to win a World Cup super-G race at 17.65 years (17 years, 237 days).

At the 2009 World Championships at Val-d'Isère, France, Gut won silver medals in the downhill and the super combined, more than two months before her 18th birthday.

On 29 September 2009, Gut fell during training at Saas-Fee, Switzerland, and dislocated her hip. She was transported by helicopter to a hospital in Visp, where it was reset. The Swiss Ski Federation initially reported that Gut would be out of competition for at least a month. In January 2010, it was announced that Gut would miss the 2010 Olympic Games in Vancouver because of a slow recovery from a hip injury. She sat out the entire 2010 season but returned for the 2011 season and earned four podiums, which included a victory in the super-G at Altenmarkt-Zauchensee in January.

Gut switched ski suppliers following the 2011 season, leaving Atomic for a three-year deal with Rossignol. Though she had seven top-ten finishes in three disciplines during the 2012 World Cup season, she did not reach a podium; her best results were three top-five finishes.

In December 2012, Gut won her first World Cup downhill in Val-d'Isère, France. She finished ahead of American Leanne Smith (0.16 sec) and fellow Swiss skier Nadja Kamer (0.5 sec).

Gut won her first Olympic medal in the downhill in 2014 at Sochi. She took the bronze, finishing 0.10 seconds behind Tina Maze and fellow Swiss skier Dominique Gisin, who both won the gold. In World Cup, she won the super-G season title and finished third overall in 2014.

After four years with Rossignol, Gut changed to Head equipment in May 2015.

At the World Championships in 2017 on home country snow in St. Moritz, Gut won bronze in the super-G. In the next event, the combined, she injured her left knee (ACL, meniscus) between runs, which ended her season.

In February 2020, Gut won her first race in over two years, the World Cup downhill in Crans-Montana, Switzerland.

In the 2020–2021 season, she had one of the most successful showings of her career thus far, winning four consecutive Super-G races on the World Cup while also entering a close battle for the overall lead with Petra Vlhová. She continued her successful season at the World Championships in Cortina d’Ampezzo. In the super-G, she delivered on the promise displayed on the World Cup, winning her first world title and bronze in the downhill. With only a single giant slalom podium on the World Cup that season, she became somewhat of a surprise winner in the giant slalom, with reigning Olympic Champion Mikaela Shiffrin having two strong runs and many of the top performers from the World Cup displaying poor performances; however, Gut-Behrami still prevailed to win the giant slalom by .02 in what was the closest giant slalom in world championship history. She became the second Swiss woman to win two golds in a single championship and the first in 34 years following Erika Hess’ strong showing in 1987.

In the 2025 World Championships in Saalbach-Hinterglemm she won a silver medal in the inaugural version of the team combined, in the pair with Wendy Holdener. It was her first medal in the combined in 16 years, after the silver in Val-d'Isère.

On 26 June 2025, she announced her retirement following the 2025–2026 season, however an early season knee injury during training has caused her to miss the rest of the season.

On 5 August 2026, she announced on RSI that she was ending her career with immediate effect, following the knee injury that had ended her hopes of competing in one final Olympic season. In her farewell interview, she reflected on her nearly two decades at the highest level of competition, describing her relationship with skiing as defined by freedom on the mountain and expressing profound happiness about her career.

== Personal life ==
Gut is fluent in Italian, German, French, and English and knows Spanish.

She married Swiss football player Valon Behrami in July 2018, and has since competed using the double-barrelled name Gut-Behrami.

== World Cup results ==
=== Season titles ===
- 9 titles – (2 Overall, 6 Super-G, 1 Giant Slalom)

Season	
Season	Discipline
2014	Super-G
2016	Overall
2016	Super-G
2021	Super-G
2023	Super-G
2024	Overall
2024	Giant Slalom
2024	Super-G
2025	Super-G

=== Season standings ===
Season
Season	Age	Overall	Slalom	Giant slalom	Super-G	Downhill	Combined	Parallel
2008	16	54	—	—	26	30	—	—N/a
2009	17	11	45	9	11	12	16	—N/a
2010	18	injured in September: out for entire season						—N/a
2011	19	10	—	28	4	7	30	—N/a
2012	20	14	—	17	8	18	30	—N/a
2013	21	9	—	6	10	5	4	—N/a
2014	22	3rd place, bronze medalist(s)	—	4	1st place, gold medalist(s)	6	15	—N/a
2015	23	9	—	24	5	6	—	—N/a
2016	24	1st place, gold medalist(s)	43	3rd place, bronze medalist(s)	1st place, gold medalist(s)	4	2nd place, silver medalist(s)	—N/a
2017	25	4	57	5	3rd place, bronze medalist(s)	3rd place, bronze medalist(s)	—	—N/a
2018	26	12	—	23	2nd place, silver medalist(s)	10	24	—N/a
2019	27	21	—	26	7	18	—	—N/a
2020	28	7	—	14	4	4	—	23
2021	29	2nd place, silver medalist(s)	—	7	1st place, gold medalist(s)	3rd place, bronze medalist(s)	—N/a	3rd place, bronze medalist(s)
2022	30	11	—	13	6	15	—N/a	15
2023	31	2nd place, silver medalist(s)	—	2nd place, silver medalist(s)	1st place, gold medalist(s)	6	—N/a	—N/a
2024	32	1st place, gold medalist(s)	—	1st place, gold medalist(s)	1st place, gold medalist(s)	2nd place, silver medalist(s)	—N/a	—N/a
2025	33	2nd place, silver medalist(s)	—	6	1st place, gold medalist(s)	5	—N/a	—N/a
2026	34	80	—	29	—	—	—N/a	—N/a

=== Race victories ===
	Total	Slalom	Giant slalom	Super-G	Downhill	Combined	Parallel
Wins	48	0	10	24	13	1	0
Podiums	101	0	29	45	24	2	1

Season
Season	Date	Location	Discipline
2009	20 December 2008	St. Moritz, Switzerland	Super-G
2011	9 January 2011	Altenmarkt-Zauchensee, Austria	Super-G
2013	14 December 2012	Val-d'Isère, France	Downhill
2014; 7 victories (4 SG, 2 DH, 1 GS)	26 October 2013	Sölden, Austria	Giant slalom
2014; 7 victories (4 SG, 2 DH, 1 GS)	29 November 2013	Beaver Creek, United States	Downhill
2014; 7 victories (4 SG, 2 DH, 1 GS)	30 November 2013	Beaver Creek, United States	Super-G
2014; 7 victories (4 SG, 2 DH, 1 GS)	8 December 2013	Lake Louise, Canada	Super-G
2014; 7 victories (4 SG, 2 DH, 1 GS)	26 January 2014	Cortina d'Ampezzo, Italy	Super-G
2014; 7 victories (4 SG, 2 DH, 1 GS)	12 March 2014	Lenzerheide, Switzerland	Downhill
2014; 7 victories (4 SG, 2 DH, 1 GS)	13 March 2014	Lenzerheide, Switzerland	Super-G
2015	7 December 2014	Lake Louise, Canada	Super-G
2015	24 January 2015	St. Moritz, Switzerland	Downhill
2016; 6 victories (1 SG, 2 DH, 2 GS, 1 AC)	27 November 2015	Aspen, United States	Giant slalom
2016; 6 victories (1 SG, 2 DH, 2 GS, 1 AC)	18 December 2015	Val-d'Isère, France	Combined
2016; 6 victories (1 SG, 2 DH, 2 GS, 1 AC)	19 December 2015	Val-d'Isère, France	Downhill
2016; 6 victories (1 SG, 2 DH, 2 GS, 1 AC)	28 December 2015	Lienz, Austria	Giant slalom
2016; 6 victories (1 SG, 2 DH, 2 GS, 1 AC)	7 February 2016	Garmisch-Partenkirchen, Germany	Super-G
2016; 6 victories (1 SG, 2 DH, 2 GS, 1 AC)	19 February 2016	La Thuile, Italy	Downhill
2017; 5 victories (3 SG, 1 DH, 1 GS)	22 October 2016	Sölden, Austria	Giant slalom
2017; 5 victories (3 SG, 1 DH, 1 GS)	4 December 2016	Lake Louise, Canada	Super-G
2017; 5 victories (3 SG, 1 DH, 1 GS)	18 December 2016	Val d'Isère, France	Super-G
2017; 5 victories (3 SG, 1 DH, 1 GS)	22 January 2017	Garmisch-Partenkirchen, Germany	Super-G
2017; 5 victories (3 SG, 1 DH, 1 GS)	28 January 2017	Cortina d'Ampezzo, Italy	Downhill
2018	21 January 2018	Cortina d'Ampezzo, Italy	Super-G
2020	21 February 2020	Crans-Montana, Switzerland	Downhill
2020	22 February 2020	Crans-Montana, Switzerland	Downhill
2021; 6 victories (4 SG, 2 DH)	10 January 2021	St. Anton, Austria	Super-G
2021; 6 victories (4 SG, 2 DH)	24 January 2021	Crans-Montana, Switzerland	Super-G
2021; 6 victories (4 SG, 2 DH)	30 January 2021	Garmisch-Partenkirchen, Germany	Super-G
2021; 6 victories (4 SG, 2 DH)	1 February 2021	Garmisch-Partenkirchen, Germany	Super-G
2021; 6 victories (4 SG, 2 DH)	26 February 2021	Val di Fassa, Italy	Downhill
2021; 6 victories (4 SG, 2 DH)	27 February 2021	Val di Fassa, Italy	Downhill
2022	11 December 2021	St. Moritz, Switzerland	Super-G
2022	15 January 2022	Altenmarkt-Zauchensee, Austria	Downhill
2023	26 November 2022	Killington, United States	Giant slalom
2023	15 January 2023	St. Anton, Austria	Super-G
2023	16 March 2023	Soldeu, Andorra	Super-G
2024; 8 victories (3 SG, 1 DH, 4 GS)	28 October 2023	Sölden, Austria	Giant slalom
2024; 8 victories (3 SG, 1 DH, 4 GS)	25 November 2023	Killington, United States	Giant slalom
2024; 8 victories (3 SG, 1 DH, 4 GS)	14 January 2024	Altenmarkt-Zauchensee, Austria	Super-G
2024; 8 victories (3 SG, 1 DH, 4 GS)	28 January 2024	Cortina d'Ampezzo, Italy	Super-G
2024; 8 victories (3 SG, 1 DH, 4 GS)	30 January 2024	Kronplatz, Italy	Giant slalom
2024; 8 victories (3 SG, 1 DH, 4 GS)	10 February 2024	Soldeu, Andorra	Giant slalom
2024; 8 victories (3 SG, 1 DH, 4 GS)	16 February 2024	Crans-Montana, Switzerland	Downhill
2024; 8 victories (3 SG, 1 DH, 4 GS)	2 March 2024	Kvitfjell, Norway	Super-G
2025	26 January 2025	Garmisch-Partenkirchen, Germany	Super-G
2025	23 March 2025	Sun Valley, United States	Super-G
2025	25 March 2025	Sun Valley, United States	Giant slalom

== World Championship results ==
Year
Year	Age	Slalom	Giant slalom	Super-G	Downhill	Combined	Team combined
2009	17	—	DNF1	7	2	2	—N/a
2011	19	—	20	4	4	DNF SL	—N/a
2013	21	—	7	2	16	DNF SL	—N/a
2015	23	—	DNF1	7	3	5	—N/a
2017	25	—	—	3	—	DNS SL	—N/a
2019	27	—	21	9	8	DNS SL	—N/a
2021	29	—	1	1	3	—	—N/a
2023	31	—	4	6	9	DNS SL	—N/a
2025	33	—	5	8	DNF	—N/a	2

- Injured between runs of Combined event in 2017

== Olympic results ==
Year
Year	Age	Slalom	Giant slalom	Super-G	Downhill	Combined
2014	22	—	9	4	3	DNF SL
2018	26	—	DNF1	4	DNF	—
2022	30	—	3	1	16	—
