= 2018 Alpine Skiing World Cup – Women's super-G =

Alpine ski discipline year standings

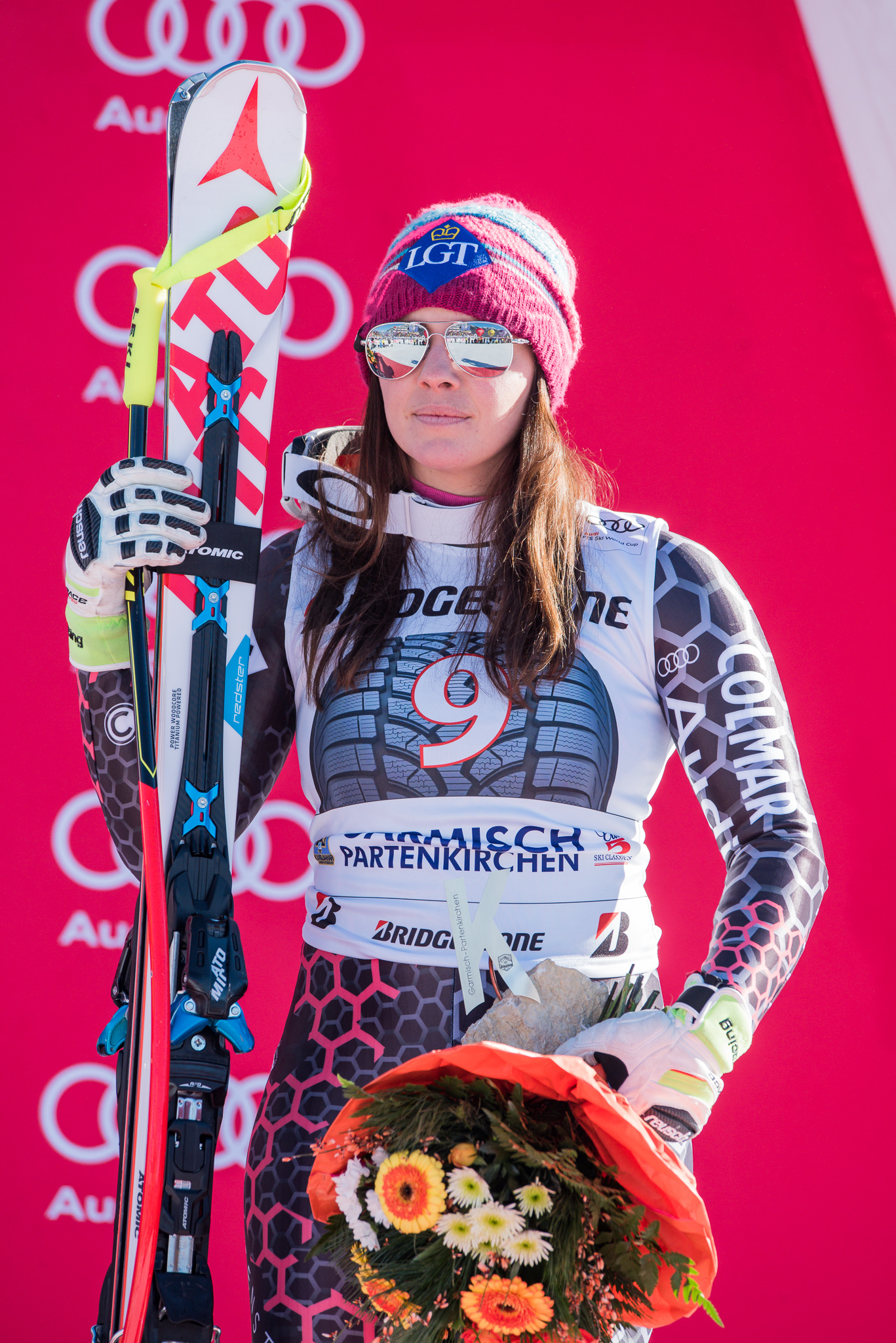
2018 Women's Super-G World Cup: Tina Weirather of Liechtenstein, season champion; 2018 Women's World Cup; Overall • downhill • super-G; giant slalom • slalom • combined
Previous: 2017	Next: 2019

The women's super-G in the 2018 FIS Alpine Skiing World Cup involved eight events, including the season final in Åre, Sweden. Defending discipline champion Tina Weirather from Liechtenstein, daughter of 1978 and 1980 overall World Cup women's champion Hanni Wenzel and 1979 men's World Cup men's downhill discipline champion Harti Weirather, won the first race of the season and then held the lead in the discipline all season, with only two-time discipline champion Lara Gut in close pursuit until the finals.

The season was interrupted by the 2018 Winter Olympics from 12 to 24 February 2018 at Yongpyong Alpine Centre (slalom and giant slalom) at the Alpensia Sports Park in PyeongChang and at the Jeongseon Alpine Centre (speed events) in Jeongseon, South Korea. The women's super-G was held on 17 February.

== Standings ==
#	Skier	3 Dec 2017; Lake Louise (Canada)	9 Dec 2017; St. Moritz (Switzerland)	16 Dec 2017; Val d'Isère (France)	17 Dec 2017; Val d'Isère (France)	13 Jan 2018; Bad Kleinkirchheim (Austria)	21 Jan 2018; Cortina d'Ampezzo (Italy)	3 Mar 2018; Crans Montana (Switzerland)	15 Mar 2018; Åre (Sweden)	Tot.
	(Liechtenstein) Tina Weirather	100	60	DNF	80	36	45	100	40	461
2	(Switzerland) Lara Gut	80	DNF	29	50	80	100	36	DNF	375
3	(Austria) Anna Veith	DNF	45	16	100	16	50	80	32	339
4	(Switzerland) Michelle Gisin	18	80	26	45	18	26	50	50	313
5	(Italy) Sofia Goggia	29	DNF	80	60	26	DNF	16	100	311
6	(Italy) Federica Brignone	DNS	50	15	36	100	DNS	50	45	296
7	(Austria) Nicole Schmidhofer	60	20	50	32	DNF	60	11	29	262
8	(Italy) Johanna Schnarf	40	36	40	15	22	80	26	0	259
9	(United States) Lindsey Vonn	DNF	7	100	DNS	29	40	DNS	60	236
	(Norway) Ragnhild Mowinckel	16	26	60	40	20	32	24	18	236
11	(Germany) Viktoria Rebensburg	20	40	36	DNF	DNS			80	176
12	(Austria) Cornelia Hütter	32	16	DSQ	22	60	16	22	DNS	168
13	(Switzerland) Jasmine Flury	36	100	13	DNF	9	DNF	7	DNF	165
14	(Switzerland) Joana Hählen	15	0	45	3	15	22	29	24	153
15	(Switzerland) Corinne Suter	26	29	22	8	12	24	0	16	137
16	(Austria) Tamara Tippler	24	10	18	DNF	40	36	5	DNF	133
17	(Italy) Nadia Fanchini	15	0	8	18	45	7	0	36	129
18	(France) Tessa Worley	50	32	4	DNF	13	18	DNS	0	117
19	(Austria) Stephanie Venier	22	24	11	11	14	DNF	3	26	111
20	(France) Tiffany Gauthier	3	9	20	13	50	13	0	DNF	108
21	(Austria) Ramona Siebenhofer	11	4	2	29	0	29	0	22	97
22	(Switzerland) Wendy Holdener	DNS	12	DNS				60	20	92
23	(Switzerland) Priska Nufer	12	0	12	10	3	20	20	0	77
24	(Austria) Christine Scheyer	0	0	6	0	26	DNF	40	0	72
25	(France) Romane Miradoli	0	14	24	9	6	15	1	0	69
	References									

- Winner
- 2nd place
- 3rd place
- DNF = Did not finish
- DSQ = Disqualified
- DNS = Did not start
- Updated at 18 March 2018, after all events.

== See also ==
- 2018 Alpine Skiing World Cup – Women's summary rankings
- 2018 Alpine Skiing World Cup – Women's overall
- 2018 Alpine Skiing World Cup – Women's downhill
- 2018 Alpine Skiing World Cup – Women's giant slalom
- 2018 Alpine Skiing World Cup – Women's slalom
- 2018 Alpine Skiing World Cup – Women's combined
