= 2018 Alpine Skiing World Cup – Women's overall =

Alpine ski discipline year standings

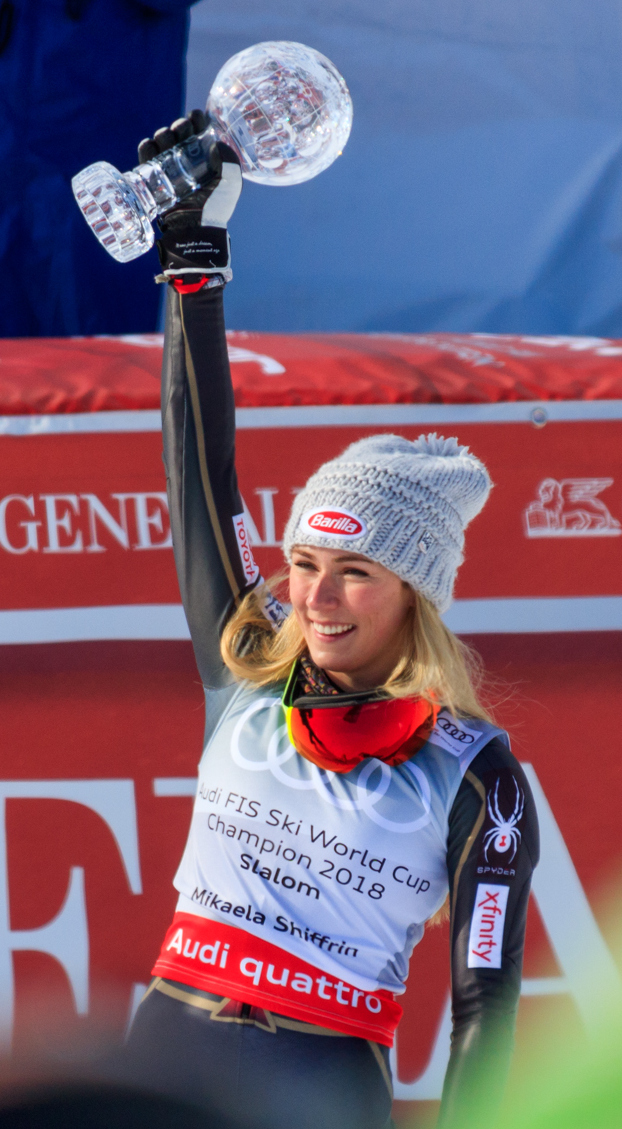
2018 women's overall World Cup: Mikaela Shiffrin of USA, champion for the second straight season; 2018 women's World Cup; Overall • downhill • super-g; giant slalom • slalom• combined
Previous: 2017	Next: 2019

The women's overall in the 2018 FIS Alpine Skiing World Cup involved 38 events in 5 disciplines: downhill (DH), Super-G (SG), giant slalom (GS), slalom (SL) [which included parallel slaloms and city events], and Alpine combined (AC).

Defending champion Mikaela Shiffrin of the United States won 12 events during the season, including 9 in the slalom discipline (seven actual slaloms plus two parallel events), just short of the all-time record of 14, to easily win the overall title. Runner-up Wendy Holdener of Switzerland was over 600 points behind, and they were the only two women to earn over 1,000 points for the season.

The season was interrupted by the 2018 Winter Olympics from 12-24 February 2018 at Yongpyong Alpine Centre (slalom and giant slalom) at the Alpensia Sports Park in PyeongChang and at the Jeongseon Alpine Centre (speed events) in Jeongseon, South Korea.

The season finals were held in Åre, Sweden.

== Standings ==
#	Skier	DH; 8 races	SG; 8 races	GS; 8 races	SL; 12 races	AC; 2 races	Tot.
	(United States) Mikaela Shiffrin	256	56	481	980	0	1,773
2	(Switzerland) Wendy Holdener	18	92	203	705	150	1,168
3	(Germany) Viktoria Rebensburg	219	176	582	0	0	977
4	(Italy) Sofia Goggia	509	311	106	0	32	958
5	(Slovakia) Petra Vlhová	0	0	149	679	60	888
6	(Liechtenstein) Tina Weirather	394	461	32	0	0	887
7	(Switzerland) Michelle Gisin	240	313	5	201	109	868
8	(Norway) Ragnhild Mowinckel	202	236	371	0	40	849
9	(Sweden) Frida Hansdotter	0	0	136	681	0	817
10	(United States) Lindsey Vonn	506	236	0	0	50	792
11	(Italy) Federica Brignone	92	296	274	12	100	774
12	(Switzerland) Lara Gut	190	375	104	0	22	691
13	(France) Tessa Worley	0	117	490	0	0	607
14	(Austria) Bernadette Schild	0	0	121	463	0	584
15	(Austria) Anna Veith	175	339	26	0	0	540
16	(Norway) Nina Haver-Løseth	0	0	124	351	0	475
17	(Austria) Nicole Schmidhofer	196	262	0	0	0	458
18	(Austria) Cornelia Hütter	272	168	0	0	0	440
19	(Switzerland) Melanie Meillard	0	0	139	292	0	431
20	(Italy) Johanna Schnarf	151	259	0	0	14	424
21	(Austria) Stephanie Brunner	0	66	249	59	45	419
22	(Italy) Irene Curtoni	0	0	130	236	0	366
23	(Switzerland) Denise Feierabend	9	15	0	267	54	345
24	(Switzerland) Jasmine Flury	153	165	0	0	0	318
25	(Italy) Marta Bassino	26	40	157	0	88	311

- Leader
- 2nd place
- 3rd place
- Updated at 18 March 2018, after all events

== See also ==
- 2018 Alpine Skiing World Cup – Women's summary rankings
- 2018 Alpine Skiing World Cup – Women's downhill
- 2018 Alpine Skiing World Cup – Women's super-G
- 2018 Alpine Skiing World Cup – Women's giant slalom
- 2018 Alpine Skiing World Cup – Women's slalom
- 2018 Alpine Skiing World Cup – Women's combined
- 2018 Alpine Skiing World Cup – Men's overall
