= 2018 Alpine Skiing World Cup – Women's downhill =

Alpine ski discipline year standings

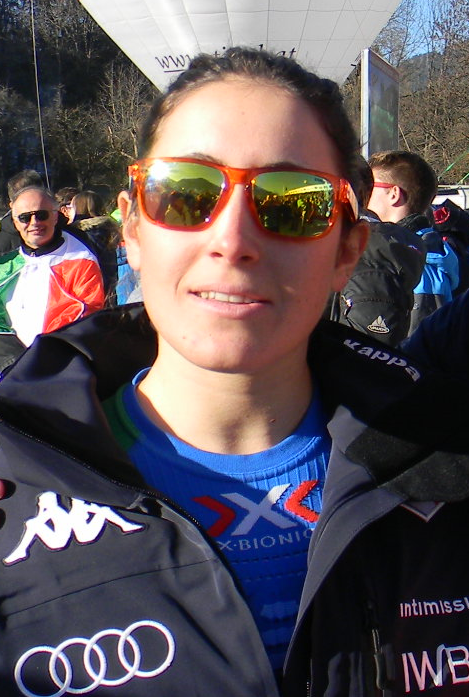
2018 Women's downhill World Cup: Sofia Goggia of Italy, season champion; 2018 Women's World Cup; Overall • downhill • super-G; giant slalom • slalom • combined
Previous: 2017	Next: 2019

The women's downhill in the 2018 FIS Alpine Skiing World Cup involved eight events, including the season finale in Åre, Sweden. Before the start of the season, defending discipline champion Ilka Štuhec of Slovakia suffered a season-ending injury. Ultimately, the discipline title ended up as a battle between oft-injured eight-time discipline champion Lindsey Vonn of the USA and rising Italian skier Sofia Goggia. Through five races, Goggia had a 63-point lead over Vonn, who had been hampered with an injury at the start of the season. Vonn won all of the last three races, earning 300 points . . . but Goggia finished second in all three, earning 240 points, to hang on to a three-point victory for the season title.

The victory in the finals was Vonn's 82nd and last World Cup victory, setting an all-time World Cup victories record for women and placing her second overall, behind only Ingemar Stenmark's 86.

The season was interrupted by the 2018 Winter Olympics from 12-24 February 2018 at Yongpyong Alpine Centre (slalom and giant slalom) at the Alpensia Sports Park in PyeongChang and at the Jeongseon Alpine Centre (speed events) in Jeongseon, South Korea. The women's downhill was held on 21 February.

== Standings ==
#	Skier	1 Dec 2017; Lake Louise (Canada)	2 Dec 2017; Lake Louise (Canada)	14 Jan 2018; Bad Kleinkirchheim (Austria)	19 Jan 2018; Cortina d'Ampezzo (Italy)	20 Jan 2018; Cortina d'Ampezzo (Italy)	3 Feb 2018; Garmisch-Partenkirchen (Germany)	4 Feb 2018; Garmisch-Partenkirchen (Germany)	14 Mar 2018; Åre (Sweden)	Tot.
	(Italy) Sofia Goggia	40	29	100	100	DNF	80	80	80	509
2	(United States) Lindsey Vonn	DNF	22	4	80	100	100	100	100	506
3	(Liechtenstein) Tina Weirather	80	45	45	12	80	36	60	36	394
4	(Austria) Cornelia Hütter	100	50	18	15	26	60	3	DNS	272
5	(United States) Mikaela Shiffrin	60	100	DNS	60	36	DNS			256
6	(Switzerland) Michelle Gisin	32	60	40	DNF	45	18	45	0	240
7	(Germany) Viktoria Rebensburg	36	80	DNS			24	29	50	219
8	(Norway) Ragnhild Mowinckel	5	26	3	40	40	32	40	16	202
9	(Austria) Nicole Schmidhofer	9	13	13	45	22	29	36	29	196
10	(Switzerland) Lara Gut	29	16	24	50	20	40	11	DNF	190
11	(United States) Breezy Johnson	26	DNF	5	9	24	50	32	32	178
12	(Austria) Anna Veith	10	16	32	20	16	45	16	20	175
13	(Austria) Stephanie Venier	16	6	29	32	32	8	50	0	173
14	(Italy) Nadia Fanchini	0	9	60	14	13	26	22	26	170
15	(Switzerland) Jasmine Flury	14	7	40	16	DNF	11	20	45	153
16	(Italy) Johanna Schnarf	13	4	7	26	29	18	14	40	151
17	(United States) Jacqueline Wiles	45	8	DNF	36	60	DNS			149
18	(United States) Alice McKennis	7	0	12	24	15	14	2	60	134
	(Switzerland) Ramona Siebenhofer	20	0	15	22	50	20	7	0	134
20	(Switzerland) Corinne Suter	15	6	22	2	11	7	24	22	109
21	(United States) Stacey Cook	24	40	9	11	6	9	DNF	DNF	99
22	(Czech Republic) Ester Ledecká	20	36	14	DNS				24	94
23	(France) Tiffany Gauthier	0	12	50	7	8	15	1	0	93
24	(Italy) Federica Brignone	DNS		80	DNF	12	DNS			92
25	(Germany) Kira Weidle	8	32	DNF	29	0	0	12	0	81
	References									

- Winner
- 2nd place
- 3rd place
- DNF = Did Not Finish
- DNS = Did Not Start
- Updated at 18 March 2018, after all events.

== See also ==
- 2018 Alpine Skiing World Cup – Women's summary rankings
- 2018 Alpine Skiing World Cup – Women's overall
- 2018 Alpine Skiing World Cup – Women's super-G
- 2018 Alpine Skiing World Cup – Women's giant slalom
- 2018 Alpine Skiing World Cup – Women's slalom
- 2018 Alpine Skiing World Cup – Women's combined
