= 2018 Alpine Skiing World Cup – Women's giant slalom =

Alpine ski discipline year standings

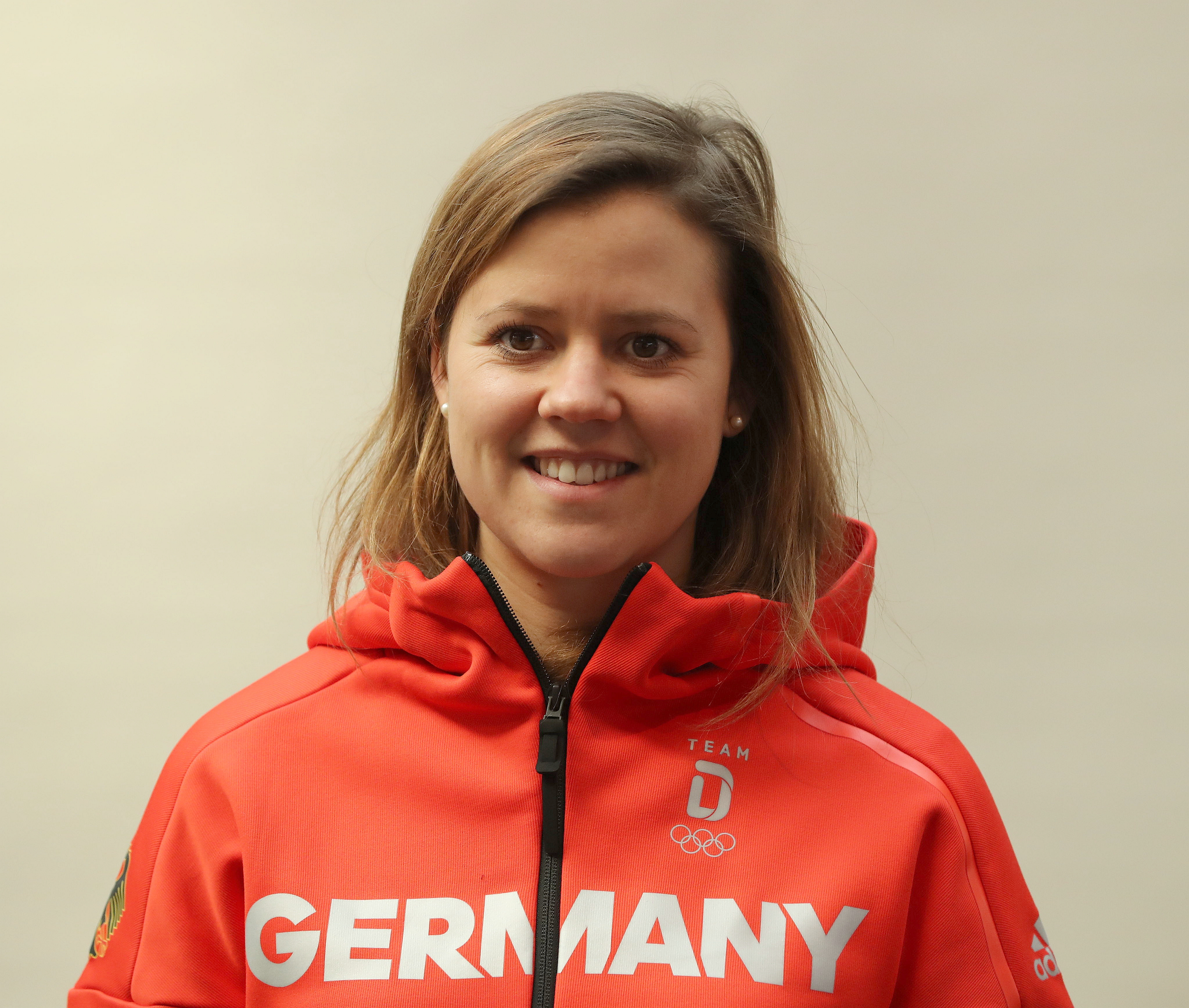
2018 Women's giant slalom World Cup: Viktoria Rebensburg of Germany, season champion; 2018 Women's World Cup; Overall • downhill • Super-G; Giant Slalom • slalom • Combined
Previous: 2017	Next: 2019

The women's giant slalom in the 2018 FIS Alpine Skiing World Cup involved eight completed events. When the World Cup finals race scheduled in Åre, Sweden was cancelled due to high winds, Viktoria Rebensburg of Germany, who had won three races during the season and held a 92-point lead over defending champion Tessa Worley of France in the discipline standings before the finals, was crowned as discipline champion for the season.

The season was interrupted by the 2018 Winter Olympics from 12-24 February 2018 at Yongpyong Alpine Centre (slalom and giant slalom) at the Alpensia Sports Park in PyeongChang and at the Jeongseon Alpine Centre (speed events) in Jeongseon, South Korea. The women's giant slalom was scheduled to be held on 12 February, but high winds forced its postponement to 15 February.

== Standings ==
#	Skier	28 Oct 2017; Sölden (Austria)	25 Nov 2017; Killington (United States)	19 Dec 2017; Courchevel (France)	29 Dec 2017; Lienz (Austria)	6 Jan 2018; Kranjska Gora (Slovenia)	23 Jan 2018; Kronplatz (Italy)	27 Jan 2018; Lenzerheide (Switzerland)	9 Mar 2018; Ofterschwang (Germany)	Tot.
	(Germany) Viktoria Rebensburg	100	100	18	80	24	100	80	80	582
2	(France) Tessa Worley	80	40	80	50	80	40	100	20	490
3	(United States) Mikaela Shiffrin	45	80	100	60	100	DNF1	36	60	481
4	(Norway) Ragnhild Mowinckel	36	24	50	29	12	80	40	100	371
5	(Italy) Federica Brignone	DNS	45	DNF1	100	40	60	29	DNF2	274
6	(Austria) Stephanie Brunner	50	50	13	45	45	22	24	DNF1	249
7	(Italy) Manuela Mölgg	60	60	60	20	DNF2	16	DNF1	32	248
8	(Switzerland) Wendy Holdener	40	12	29	12	50	26	16	18	203
9	(Slovenia) Ana Drev	DNF1	32	24	40	11	24	45	22	198
10	(Sweden) Sara Hector	29	DNF1	24	18	36	45	DNF1	9	161
11	(Slovenia) Meta Hrovat	3	4	14	32	20	12	60	13	158
12	(Italy) Marta Bassino	DNF1	22	32	DNF2	8	50	DNF2	45	157
13	(Slovakia) Petra Vlhová	15	26	3	36	29	8	32	DNF1	149
14	(Austria) Ricarda Haaser	24	DNF1	16	13	6	15	22	50	146
15	(Slovenia) Tina Robnik	29	15	9	24	36	13	18	DNF1	144
16	(Switzerland) Melanie Meillard	DNF2	29	40	5	22	29	14	DNS	139
17	(Sweden) Frida Hansdotter	10	36	5	2	15	18	10	40	136
18	(Italy) Irene Curtoni	18	13	12	6	8	32	15	26	130
19	(Sweden) Estelle Alphand	18	DNQ	11	16	26	36	13	5	125
20	(Norway) Nina Haver-Løseth	9	5	45	9	DNF2	20	DNF1	36	124
21	(Austria) Bernadette Schild	22	20	DNQ	11	DNF1	15	29	24	121
22	(Italy) Sofia Goggia	DNF1	16	15	15	60	DNS	DNF1	DNF2	106
23	(Switzerland) Lara Gut	DNF1	8	26	26	16	5	11	12	104
24	(Norway) Kristin Lysdahl	32	DNF1	DNF1	14	DNQ	6	12	29	93
25	(Austria) Elisabeth Kappaurer	20	18	10	22	18	DNS	DNF1	DNQ	88
	References									

- Winner
- 2nd place
- 3rd place
- DNF1 = Did not finish run 1
- DSQ1 = Disqualified run 1
- DNQ = Did not qualify for run 2
- DNF2 = Did not finish run 2
- DSQ2 = Disqualified run 2
- DNS = Did not start
- Updated at 18 March 2018, after all events.

== See also ==
- 2018 Alpine Skiing World Cup – Women's summary rankings
- 2018 Alpine Skiing World Cup – Women's overall
- 2018 Alpine Skiing World Cup – Women's downhill
- 2018 Alpine Skiing World Cup – Women's super-G
- 2018 Alpine Skiing World Cup – Women's slalom
- 2018 Alpine Skiing World Cup – Women's combined
