= 2012–13 FIS Alpine Ski World Cup =

International sports competition

FIS Alpine Ski World Cup 2012/13
Discipline	Men	Women
Overall	(Austria) Marcel Hirscher	(Slovenia) Tina Maze
Downhill	(Norway) Aksel Lund Svindal	(United States) Lindsey Vonn
Super-G	(Norway) Aksel Lund Svindal	(Slovenia) Tina Maze
Giant slalom	(United States) Ted Ligety	(Slovenia) Tina Maze
Slalom	(Austria) Marcel Hirscher	(United States) Mikaela Shiffrin
Nations Cup	Austria	Austria
- Nations Cup Overall: Austria

Competition
Locations	19	20
Individual	34	35
Mixed	1	1
Cancelled	2	2
Rescheduled	—	1

2013 World Cup Champions

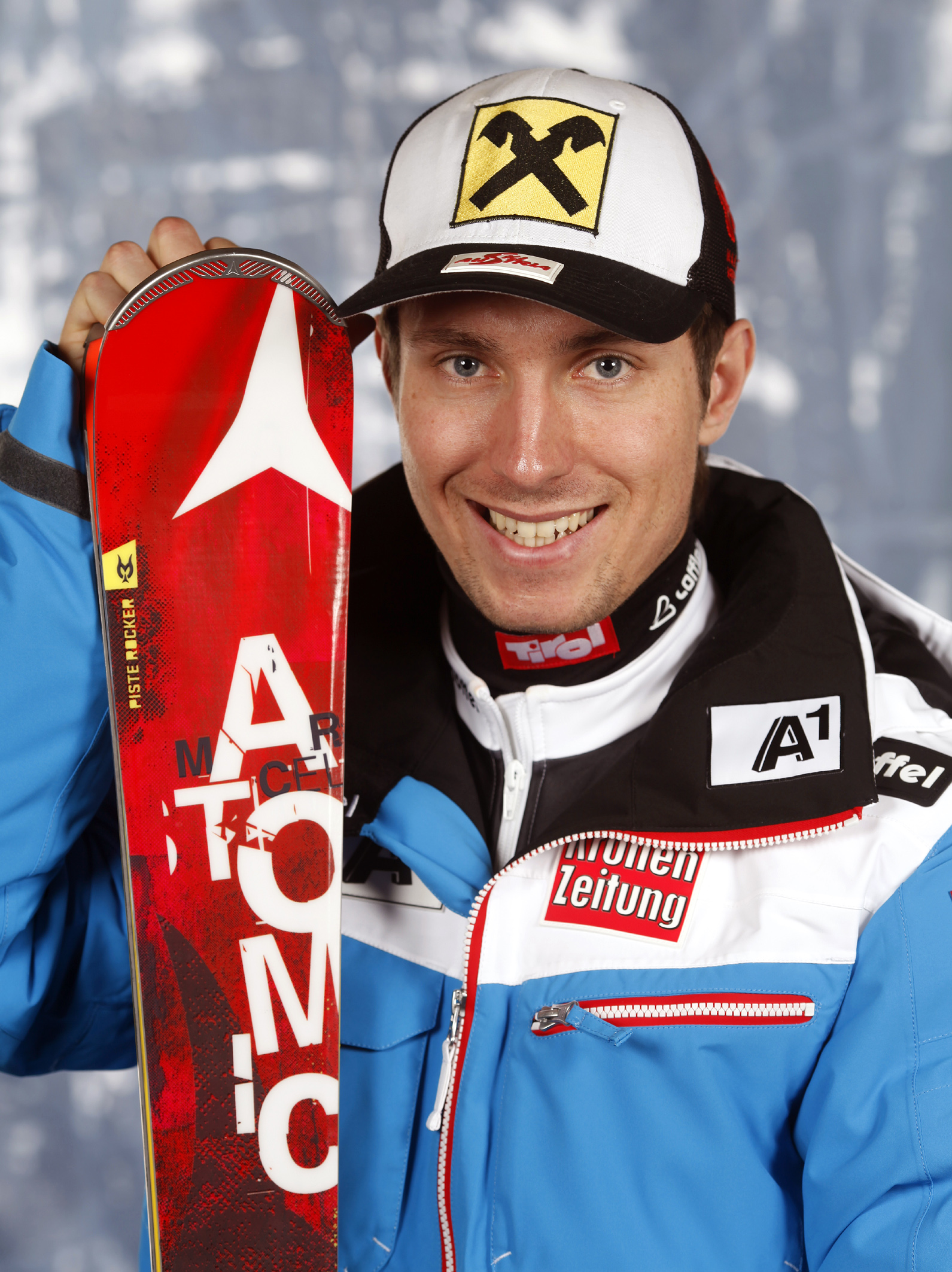
Marcel Hirscher won the overall title for the second successive year, the first man to do so since Stephan Eberharter in 2002 and 2003.

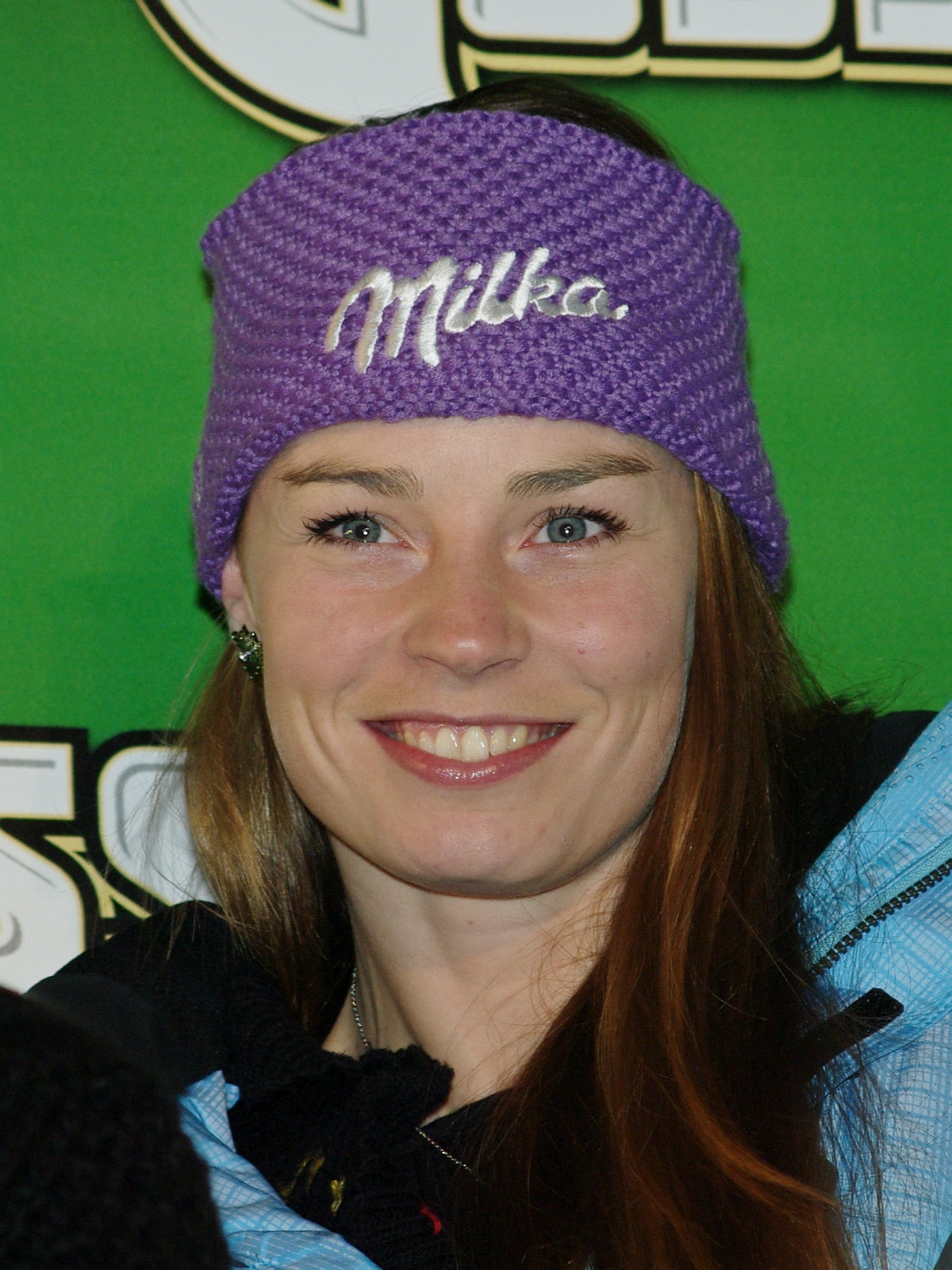
Tina Maze became the first Slovenian to win an overall World Cup title, and the first skier to score more than 2,000 points in a season.

The 47th World Cup season began on 27 October 2012, in Sölden, Austria, and concluded on 17 March 2013, at the World Cup finals in Lenzerheide, Switzerland. The overall titles were won by Marcel Hirscher of Austria and Tina Maze of Slovenia.

A break in the schedule was for the biennial World Championships, held 4–17 February in Schladming, Austria. Changes for the 2013 season included the awarding of World Cup points for the slalom crystal globe for the limited field city events (parallel slalom), not just in the overall standings. Also, a crystal globe trophy was no longer awarded for the combined event, as many organizers considered the event difficult to market, but its results still counted in the overall rankings.

Maze became the first Slovenian to win an overall World Cup title; she clinched it on 24 February after her eighth victory of the season, a super-combined race at Méribel, France. Her victory in a downhill race at Garmisch-Partenkirchen in Germany on 2 March gave her wins in all five disciplines for the season, and she became the first racer in World Cup history to score more than 2,000 points in a single season. The previous record of 2,000 points was held by Hermann Maier, set during the 2000 season.

Maze broke various statistical records in this season, including the highest number of podiums in a season (24, record previously held by Maier (22) and by Hanni Wenzel and Pernilla Wiberg for ladies (18)), highest number of top 5 finishes (31, previously Maier and Wiberg (24)), highest number of points after first 10 races (677, previously Katja Seizinger, 643), largest percent of possible points won (69%, previously 61% by Wiberg), and the highest margin over the runner-up (1313, compared to 743 for Maier and 578 for Lindsey Vonn). Maze finished on podium in all giant slalom events, previously achieved only by Vreni Schneider in 1989. She is also the first woman to remain at the top of the overall standings throughout the season - a feat previously achieved only by Bode Miller in 2005. In addition to the overall title, Maze won the super-G and giant slalom titles, finished at the top of the combined list by winning both races in the season, and finished second in the downhill and slalom. Those titles went respectively to two Americans, Vonn and Mikaela Shiffrin. Vonn's season ended with a knee injury on 5 February at the World Championships, but she held on to win the downhill title by a single point after the final race was cancelled. Three days after turning 18, Shiffrin won the final slalom race at Lenzerheide on 16 March to overtake Maze and win that discipline's season title by 33 points.

The men's overall title wasn't decided until the World Cup finals at Lenzerheide. A runner-up finish in the giant slalom on 16 March gave Hirscher his second consecutive overall title, the first male to achieve this feat since Stephan Eberharter in 2002 and 2003. Hirscher also won the slalom title, while the downhill and super-G titles went to Aksel Lund Svindal of Norway, the sixth and seventh discipline titles for the former two-time overall champion. The giant slalom title went to American Ted Ligety, who won six of the eight GS races for his fourth season title in that discipline.

== Calendar ==
=== Men ===
Event key: DH – Downhill, SL – Slalom, GS – Giant slalom, SG – Super giant slalom, KB – Classic Combined, SC – Super combined, CE – City Event (Parallel)
Race	Season	Date	Place	Type	Winner	Second	Third	Details
1488	1	28 October 2012	(Austria) Sölden	GS _{356}	(United States) Ted Ligety	(Italy) Manfred Mölgg	(Austria) Marcel Hirscher	
1489	2	11 November 2012	(Finland) Levi	SL _{422}	(Sweden) André Myhrer	(Austria) Marcel Hirscher	(Sweden) Jens Byggmark	
1490	3	24 November 2012	(Canada) Lake Louise	DH _{425}	(Norway) Aksel Lund Svindal	(Austria) Max Franz	(United States) Marco Sullivan (Austria) Klaus Kröll	
1491	4	25 November 2012	(Canada) Lake Louise	SG _{167}	(Norway) Aksel Lund Svindal	(France) Adrien Théaux	(Austria) Joachim Puchner	
1492	5	30 November 2012	(United States) Beaver Creek	DH _{426}	(Italy) Christof Innerhofer	(Norway) Aksel Lund Svindal	(Norway) Kjetil Jansrud	
1493	6	1 December 2012	(United States) Beaver Creek	SG _{168}	(Italy) Matteo Marsaglia	(Norway) Aksel Lund Svindal	(Austria) Hannes Reichelt	
1494	7	2 December 2012	(United States) Beaver Creek	GS _{357}	(United States) Ted Ligety	(Austria) Marcel Hirscher	(Italy) Davide Simoncelli	
1495	8	8 December 2012	(France) Val-d'Isère	SL _{423}	(France) Alexis Pinturault	(Germany) Felix Neureuther	(Austria) Marcel Hirscher	
1496	9	9 December 2012	(France) Val-d'Isère	GS _{358}	(Austria) Marcel Hirscher	(Germany) Stefan Luitz	(United States) Ted Ligety	
1497	10	14 December 2012	(Italy) Val Gardena	SG _{169}	(Norway) Aksel Lund Svindal	(Italy) Matteo Marsaglia	(Italy) Werner Heel	
1498	11	15 December 2012	(Italy) Val Gardena	DH _{427}	(United States) Steven Nyman	(Slovenia) Rok Perko	(Canada) Erik Guay	
1499	12	16 December 2012	(Italy) Alta Badia	GS _{359}	(United States) Ted Ligety	(Austria) Marcel Hirscher	(France) Thomas Fanara	
1500	13	18 December 2012	(Italy) Madonna di Campiglio	SL _{424}	(Austria) Marcel Hirscher	(Germany) Felix Neureuther	(Japan) Naoki Yuasa	
1501	14	29 December 2012	(Italy) Bormio	DH _{428}	(Austria) Hannes Reichelt (Italy) Dominik Paris		(Norway) Aksel Lund Svindal	
1502	15	1 January 2013	(Germany) Munich	CE _{003}	(Germany) Felix Neureuther	(Austria) Marcel Hirscher	(France) Alexis Pinturault	
1503	16	6 January 2013	(Croatia) Zagreb	SL _{425}	(Austria) Marcel Hirscher	(Sweden) André Myhrer	(Austria) Mario Matt	
1504	17	12 January 2013	(Switzerland) Adelboden	GS _{360}	(United States) Ted Ligety	(Germany) Fritz Dopfer	(Germany) Felix Neureuther	
1505	18	13 January 2013	(Switzerland) Adelboden	SL _{426}	(Austria) Marcel Hirscher	(Austria) Mario Matt	(Italy) Manfred Mölgg	
1506	19	18 January 2013	(Switzerland) Wengen	SC _{117}	(France) Alexis Pinturault	(Croatia) Ivica Kostelić	(Switzerland) Carlo Janka	
1507	20	19 January 2013	(Switzerland) Wengen	DH _{429}	(Italy) Christof Innerhofer	(Austria) Klaus Kröll	(Austria) Hannes Reichelt	
1508	21	20 January 2013	(Switzerland) Wengen	SL _{427}	(Germany) Felix Neureuther	(Austria) Marcel Hirscher	(Croatia) Ivica Kostelić	
1509	22	25 January 2013	(Austria) Kitzbühel	SG _{170}	(Norway) Aksel Lund Svindal	(Austria) Matthias Mayer	(Italy) Christof Innerhofer	
1510	23	26 January 2013	(Austria) Kitzbühel	DH _{430}	(Italy) Dominik Paris	(Canada) Erik Guay	(Austria) Hannes Reichelt	
1511	24	27 January 2013	(Austria) Kitzbühel	SL _{428}	(Austria) Marcel Hirscher	(Germany) Felix Neureuther	(Croatia) Ivica Kostelić	
1512	25	27 January 2013	(Austria) Kitzbühel	KB _{118}	(Croatia) Ivica Kostelić	(France) Alexis Pinturault	(France) Thomas Mermillod-Blondin	
1513	26	29 January 2013	(Russia) Moscow	CE _{004}	(Austria) Marcel Hirscher	(Sweden) André Myhrer	(Croatia) Ivica Kostelić	
2013 World Championships (5–17 February)
1514	27	23 February 2013	(Germany) Garmisch-Partenkirchen	DH _{431}	(Italy) Christof Innerhofer	(Austria) Georg Streitberger	(Austria) Klaus Kröll	
1515	28	24 February 2013	(Germany) Garmisch-Partenkirchen	GS _{361}	(France) Alexis Pinturault	(Austria) Marcel Hirscher	(United States) Ted Ligety	
1516	29	2 March 2013	(Norway) Kvitfjell	DH _{432}	(France) Adrien Théaux	(Norway) Aksel Lund Svindal	(Austria) Klaus Kröll	
1517	30	3 March 2013	(Norway) Kvitfjell	SG _{171}	(Norway) Aksel Lund Svindal	(Austria) Georg Streitberger	(Italy) Werner Heel	
1518	31	9 March 2013	(Slovenia) Kranjska Gora	GS _{362}	(United States) Ted Ligety	(Austria) Marcel Hirscher	(France) Alexis Pinturault	
1519	32	10 March 2013	(Slovenia) Kranjska Gora	SL _{429}	(Croatia) Ivica Kostelić	(Austria) Marcel Hirscher	(Austria) Mario Matt	
		13 March 2013	(Switzerland) Lenzerheide	DH _{cnx}	fog			
		14 March 2013	(Switzerland) Lenzerheide	SG _{cnx}	strong winds			
1520	33	16 March 2013	(Switzerland) Lenzerheide	GS _{363}	(United States) Ted Ligety	(Austria) Marcel Hirscher	(France) Alexis Pinturault	
1521	34	17 March 2013	(Switzerland) Lenzerheide	SL _{430}	(Germany) Felix Neureuther	(Austria) Marcel Hirscher	(Croatia) Ivica Kostelić	

=== Women ===
Event key: DH – Downhill, SL – Slalom, GS – Giant slalom, SG – Super giant slalom, SC – Super combined, CE – City Event (Parallel)
Race	Season	Date	Place	Type	Winner	Second	Third	Details
1388	1	27 October 2012	(Austria) Sölden	GS _{355}	(Slovenia) Tina Maze	(Austria) Kathrin Zettel	(Austria) Stefanie Köhle	
1389	2	10 November 2012	(Finland) Levi	SL _{401}	(Germany) Maria Höfl-Riesch	(Finland) Tanja Poutiainen	(United States) Mikaela Shiffrin	
1390	3	24 November 2012	(United States) Aspen	GS _{356}	(Slovenia) Tina Maze	(Austria) Kathrin Zettel	(Germany) Viktoria Rebensburg	
1391	4	25 November 2012	(United States) Aspen	SL _{402}	(Austria) Kathrin Zettel	(Austria) Marlies Schild	(Slovenia) Tina Maze	
1392	5	30 November 2012	(Canada) Lake Louise	DH _{353}	(United States) Lindsey Vonn	(United States) Stacey Cook	(Germany) Maria Höfl-Riesch (Liechtenstein) Tina Weirather	
1393	6	1 December 2012	(Canada) Lake Louise	DH _{354}	(United States) Lindsey Vonn	(United States) Stacey Cook	(Switzerland) Marianne Kaufmann-Abderhalden	
1394	7	2 December 2012	(Canada) Lake Louise	SG _{185}	(United States) Lindsey Vonn	(United States) Julia Mancuso	(Austria) Anna Fenninger	
1395	8	7 December 2012	(Switzerland) St. Moritz	SC _{092}	(Slovenia) Tina Maze	(Austria) Nicole Hosp	(Austria) Kathrin Zettel	
1396	9	8 December 2012	(Switzerland) St. Moritz	SG _{186}	(United States) Lindsey Vonn	(Slovenia) Tina Maze	(United States) Julia Mancuso	
1397	10	9 December 2012	(Switzerland) St. Moritz	GS _{357}	(Slovenia) Tina Maze	(Germany) Viktoria Rebensburg	(France) Tessa Worley	
1398	11	14 December 2012	(France) Val-d'Isère	DH _{355}	(Switzerland) Lara Gut	(United States) Leanne Smith	(Switzerland) Nadja Kamer	
		15 December 2012	(France) Val-d'Isère	SG _{cnx}	heavy snow; replaced in Garmisch-Partenkirchen on 1 March 2013			
1399	12	16 December 2012	(France) Courchevel	GS _{358}	(Slovenia) Tina Maze	(Austria) Kathrin Zettel	(France) Tessa Worley	
1400	13	19 December 2012	(Sweden) Åre	GS _{359}	(Germany) Viktoria Rebensburg	(Austria) Anna Fenninger	(Slovenia) Tina Maze	
1401	14	20 December 2012	(Sweden) Åre	SL _{403}	(United States) Mikaela Shiffrin	(Sweden) Frida Hansdotter	(Slovenia) Tina Maze	
1402	15	28 December 2012	(Austria) Semmering	GS _{360}	(Austria) Anna Fenninger	(Slovenia) Tina Maze	(France) Tessa Worley	
1403	16	29 December 2012	(Austria) Semmering	SL _{404}	(Slovakia) Veronika Velez-Zuzulová	(Austria) Kathrin Zettel	(Slovenia) Tina Maze	
1404	17	1 January 2013	(Germany) Munich	CE _{003}	(Slovakia) Veronika Velez-Zuzulová	(Slovenia) Tina Maze	(Austria) Michaela Kirchgasser	
1405	18	4 January 2013	(Croatia) Zagreb	SL _{405}	(United States) Mikaela Shiffrin	(Sweden) Frida Hansdotter	(Canada) Erin Mielzynski	
1406	19	12 January 2013	(Austria) St. Anton	DH _{356}	(United States) Alice McKennis	(Italy) Daniela Merighetti	(Austria) Anna Fenninger	
1407	20	13 January 2013	(Austria) St. Anton	SG _{187}	(Slovenia) Tina Maze	(Austria) Anna Fenninger	(Switzerland) Fabienne Suter	
1408	21	15 January 2013	(Austria) Flachau	SL _{406}	(United States) Mikaela Shiffrin	(Sweden) Frida Hansdotter	(Finland) Tanja Poutiainen	
1409	22	19 January 2013	(Italy) Cortina d'Ampezzo	DH _{357}	(United States) Lindsey Vonn	(Slovenia) Tina Maze	(United States) Leanne Smith	
1410	23	20 January 2013	(Italy) Cortina d'Ampezzo	SG _{188}	(Germany) Viktoria Rebensburg	(Austria) Nicole Schmidhofer	(Slovenia) Tina Maze	
1411	24	26 January 2013	(Slovenia) Maribor	GS _{361}	(United States) Lindsey Vonn	(Slovenia) Tina Maze	(Austria) Anna Fenninger	
1412	25	27 January 2013	(Slovenia) Maribor	SL _{407}	(Slovenia) Tina Maze	(Sweden) Frida Hansdotter	(Austria) Kathrin Zettel	
1413	26	29 January 2013	(Russia) Moscow	CE _{004}	(Germany) Lena Dürr	(Slovakia) Veronika Velez-Zuzulová	(United States) Mikaela Shiffrin	
2013 World Championships (5–17 February)
1414	27	23 February 2013	(France) Méribel	DH _{358}	(Spain) Carolina Ruiz Castillo	(Germany) Maria Höfl-Riesch	(France) Marie Marchand-Arvier	
1415	28	24 February 2013	(France) Méribel	SC _{093}	(Slovenia) Tina Maze	(Austria) Nicole Hosp	(Austria) Michaela Kirchgasser	
1416	29	(Note: Super giant slalom from Val-d'Isère was rescheduled to Garmisch-Partenkirchen on 1 March 2013)1 March 2013	(Germany) Garmisch-Partenkirchen	SG _{189}	(Liechtenstein) Tina Weirather	(Slovenia) Tina Maze (United States) Julia Mancuso		
1417	30	2 March 2013	(Germany) Garmisch-Partenkirchen	DH _{359}	(Slovenia) Tina Maze	(United States) Laurenne Ross	(Germany) Maria Höfl-Riesch	
1418	31	3 March 2013	(Germany) Garmisch-Partenkirchen	SG _{190}	(Austria) Anna Fenninger	(Germany) Maria Höfl-Riesch	(United States) Julia Mancuso	
1419	32	9 March 2013	(Germany) Ofterschwang	GS _{362}	(Austria) Anna Fenninger	(Slovenia) Tina Maze	(Germany) Viktoria Rebensburg	
1420	33	10 March 2013	(Germany) Ofterschwang	SL _{408}	(Slovenia) Tina Maze	(Switzerland) Wendy Holdener	(United States) Mikaela Shiffrin	
		13 March 2013	(Switzerland) Lenzerheide	DH _{cnx}	fog			
		14 March 2013	(Switzerland) Lenzerheide	SG _{cnx}	strong winds			
1421	34	16 March 2013	(Switzerland) Lenzerheide	SL _{409}	(United States) Mikaela Shiffrin	(Austria) Bernadette Schild	(Slovenia) Tina Maze	
1422	35	17 March 2013	(Switzerland) Lenzerheide	GS _{363}	(Slovenia) Tina Maze	(France) Tessa Worley	(Switzerland) Lara Gut	

=== Nation team event ===
Event key: PG – Parallel giant slalom
Race	Season	Date	Place	Type	Winner	Second	Third	Details
7	1	15 March 2013	(Switzerland) Lenzerheide	PG _{004}	Germany Lena Dürr; Veronique Hronek; Viktoria Rebensburg; Fritz Dopfer; Felix Neureuther	Sweden Therese Borssén; Frida Hansdotter; Maria Pietilä Holmner; Jens Byggmark; Mattias Hargin; André Myhrer	Italy Elena Curtoni; Denise Karbon; Daniela Merighetti; Cristian Deville; Stefano Gross; Davide Simoncelli	

== Men's standings ==
=== Overall ===
Rank	after all 34 races	Points
1	(Austria) Marcel Hirscher	1535
2	(Norway) Aksel Lund Svindal	1226
3	(United States) Ted Ligety	1022
4	(Germany) Felix Neureuther	948
5	(Croatia) Ivica Kostelić	900

=== Downhill ===
Rank	after all 8 races	Points
1	(Norway) Aksel Lund Svindal	439
2	(Austria) Klaus Kröll	381
3	(Italy) Dominik Paris	378
4	(Italy) Christof Innerhofer	370
5	(Austria) Hannes Reichelt	290

=== Super-G ===
Rank	after all 5 races	Points
1	(Norway) Aksel Lund Svindal	480
2	(Italy) Matteo Marsaglia	249
3	(Austria) Matthias Mayer	228
4	(Italy) Werner Heel	224
5	(France) Adrien Théaux	191

=== Giant slalom ===
Rank	after all 8 races	Points
1	(United States) Ted Ligety	720
2	(Austria) Marcel Hirscher	575
3	(France) Alexis Pinturault	326
4	(Italy) Manfred Mölgg	301
5	(France) Thomas Fanara	236

=== Slalom ===
Rank	after all 11 races	Points
1	(Austria) Marcel Hirscher	960
2	(Germany) Felix Neureuther	716
3	(Croatia) Ivica Kostelić	535
4	(Sweden) André Myhrer	532
5	(Italy) Manfred Mölgg	335

=== Super combined ===
Rank	after all 2 races	Points
1	(Croatia) Ivica Kostelić (no trophy) (Note: Crystal globes were not officially awarded in the discipline, in 2013.)	180
1	(France) Alexis Pinturault (no trophy)	180
3	(France) Thomas Mermillod-Blondin	96
4	(Switzerland) Carlo Janka	86
5	(Norway) Aksel Lund Svindal	63

== Women's standings ==
=== Overall ===
Rank	after all 35 races	Points
1	(Slovenia) Tina Maze	2414
2	(Germany) Maria Höfl-Riesch	1101
3	(Austria) Anna Fenninger	1029
4	(United States) Julia Mancuso	867
5	(United States) Mikaela Shiffrin	822

=== Downhill ===
Rank	after all 7 races	Points
1	(United States) Lindsey Vonn	340
2	(Slovenia) Tina Maze	339
3	(Germany) Maria Höfl-Riesch	272
4	(United States) Stacey Cook	244
5	(Switzerland) Lara Gut	228

=== Super-G ===
Rank	after all 6 races	Points
1	(Slovenia) Tina Maze	420
2	(United States) Julia Mancuso	365
3	(Austria) Anna Fenninger	304
4	(United States) Lindsey Vonn	286
5	(Germany) Maria Höfl-Riesch	251

=== Giant slalom ===
Rank	after all 9 races	Points
1	(Slovenia) Tina Maze	800
2	(Austria) Anna Fenninger	480
3	(Germany) Viktoria Rebensburg	411
4	(France) Tessa Worley	383
5	(Austria) Kathrin Zettel	382

=== Slalom ===
Rank	after all 11 races	Points
1	(United States) Mikaela Shiffrin	688
2	(Slovenia) Tina Maze	655
3	(Slovakia) Veronika Velez-Zuzulová	500
4	(Sweden) Frida Hansdotter	435
5	(Finland) Tanja Poutiainen	354

=== Super combined ===
Rank	after all 2 races	Points
1	(Slovenia) Tina Maze(no trophy)	200
2	(Austria) Nicole Hosp	160
3	(Austria) Michaela Kirchgasser	89
4	(Switzerland) Lara Gut	77
4	(Canada) Marie-Michèle Gagnon	77

== Nations Cup ==
=== Overall ===
Rank		Points
1	Austria	11103
2	Italy	5815
3	United States	5185
4	France	5076
5	Germany	4818

- Final standings after 69 races.

=== Men ===
Rank		Points
1	Austria	6089
2	Italy	3983
3	France	3219
4	Norway	2013
5	Germany	1923

- Final standings after 34 races.

=== Women ===
Rank		Points
1	Austria	5014
2	United States	3537
3	Germany	2895
4	Slovenia	2714
5	Switzerland	2424

- Final standings after 35 races.

== Podium table by nation ==
Table showing the World Cup podium places (gold–1st place, silver–2nd place, bronze–3rd place) by the countries represented by the athletes.

Rank	Nation	Gold	Silver	Bronze	Total
1	United States	18	6	9	33
2	Austria	11	27	19	57
3	Slovenia	11	8	6	25
4	Germany	8	8	5	21
5	Italy	6	3	6	15
6	Norway	5	3	2	10
7	France	4	3	9	16
8	Croatia	2	1	4	7
9	Slovakia	2	1	0	3
10	Sweden	1	7	1	9
11	Switzerland	1	1	5	7
12	Liechtenstein	1	0	1	2
13	Spain	1	0	0	1
14	Canada	0	1	2	3
15	Finland	0	1	1	2
16	Japan	0	0	1	1
Totals (16 entries)		71	70	71	212
