= 2018 Alpine Skiing World Cup – Women's slalom =

Alpine ski discipline year standings

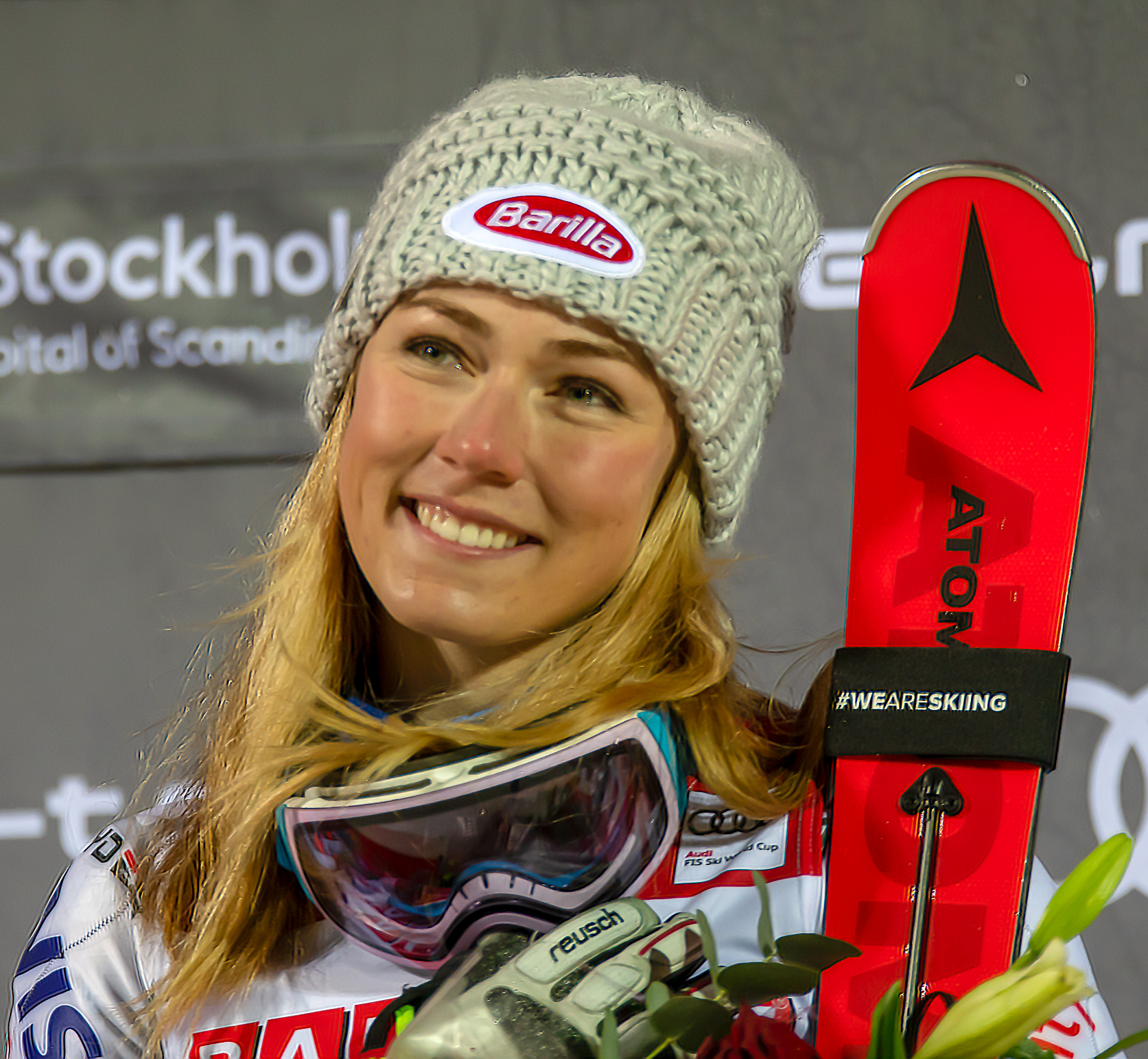
2018 Women's slalom World Cup: Mikaela Shiffrin of the USA, season champion; 2018 Women's World Cup; Overall • downhill • Super-G; giant slalom • Slalom • Combined
Previous: 2017	Next: 2019

The women's slalom in the 2018 FIS Alpine Skiing World Cup involved 12 events, including three parallel races (one parallel slalom and two city events) and the season finale in Åre, Sweden.

Defending champion Mikaela Shiffrin from the United States won nine of the twelve races for the season (seven of the nine slaloms and two of the three parallel races); this was Shiffrin's fifth discipline championship in slalom.

The season was interrupted by the 2018 Winter Olympics from 12-24 February 2018 at Yongpyong Alpine Centre (slalom and giant slalom) at the Alpensia Sports Park in PyeongChang and at the Jeongseon Alpine Centre (speed events) in Jeongseon, South Korea. The women's slalom was held on 22 February.

== Standings ==
Parallel Slalom (PS) or City Event (CE)

#	Skier	11 Nov 2017; Levi (Finland)	25 Nov 2017; Killington (United States)	20 Dec 2017; Courchevel (PS) (France)	28 Dec 2017; Lienz (Austria)	1 Jan 2018; Oslo (CE) (Norway)	3 Jan 2018; Zagreb (Croatia)	7 Jan 2018; Kranjska Gora (Slovenia)	9 Jan 2018; Flachau (Austria)	28 Jan 2018; Lenzerheide (Switzerland)	30 Jan 2018; Stockholm (CE) (Sweden)	10 Mar 2018; Ofterschwang (Germany)	17 Mar 2018; Åre (Sweden)	Tot.
	(United States) Mikaela Shiffrin	80	100	100	100	100	100	100	100	DNF2	DNS	100	100	980
2	(Switzerland) Wendy Holdener	60	DNF2	45	80	80	80	60	DNF1	60	80	80	80	705
3	(Sweden) Frida Hansdotter	50	45	26	60	50	60	80	60	80	50	60	60	681
4	(Slovakia) Petra Vlhová	100	80	80	45	40	50	50	DNF1	100	60	50	24	679
5	(Austria) Bernadette Schild	DNF1	60	12	50	40	45	45	80	6	40	40	45	463
6	(Norway) Nina Haver-Løseth	DNF2	20	DNS	24	15	DNF1	29	50	45	100	18	50	351
7	(Austria) Katharina Gallhuber	8	36	DNS	36	DNS	40	DNF1	26	36	40	45	36	303
8	(Switzerland) Melanie Meillard	45	DNF1	24	29	60	29	40	DNF2	50	15	DNS		292
9	(Sweden) Anna Swenn-Larsson	36	40	5	9	15	26	26	36	18	15	36	29	291
10	(Switzerland) Denise Feierabend	15	50	32	29	15	15	DNF2	24	26	15	24	22	267
11	(Italy) Irene Curtoni	DNS	22	60	16	15	16	18	20	29	40	DNF1	0	236
12	(Austria) Katharina Truppe	DNF1	DNQ	36	14	15	11	15	45	20	15	20	18	209
13	(Switzerland) Michelle Gisin	16	26	DNS	20	DNS	20	24	10	16	DNS	29	40	201
14	(Austria) Katharina Liensberger	DNQ	16	DNS	8	DNS	32	DNF2	32	40	DNS	26	32	186
15	(Canada) Erin Mielzynski	4	DNQ	10	DNF2	DNS	36	16	22	32	DNS	36	26	182
16	(Germany) Christina Geiger	DNS	13	29	32	DNS	12	36	18	DNF1	40	DNS		180
17	(Germany) Marina Wallner	DNF1	29	16	11	15	22	10	16	24	15	13	DNF1	171
18	(Germany) Lena Dürr	40	15	DNS	22	40	2	20	DNF1	9	15	DNF1	0	163
19	(Italy) Chiara Costazza	3	32	11	DNF2	15	3	22	40	DNF1	15	16	DNF1	157
20	(Norway) Maren Skjøld	14	DNF2	50	DNQ	40	6	9	7	15	DNS	4	0	145
21	(Sweden) Estelle Alphand	6	8	DNS	45	DNS	DNF2	32	15	DNF2	DNS	DNF2	20	126
22	(Slovenia) Ana Bucik	29	14	8	DNF1	15	7	DNF1	9	0	DNS	9	16	107
23	(United States) Resi Stiegler	10	10	3	6	DNS	18	DNF1	5	13	15	DNS		80
	(Austria) Carmen Thalmann	7	DNF1	22	4	DNS	9	DNF1	14	DNF1	DNS	24	0	80
25	(Slovenia) Maruša Ferk	14	9	13	DNQ	DNS	13	11	8	11	DNS	DNQ	0	79
	References													

- Winner
- 2nd place
- 3rd place
- DNF1 = Did Not Finish run 1
- DSQ1 = Disqualified run 1
- DNQ = Did not qualify for run 2
- DNF2 = Did Not Finish run 2
- DSQ2 = Disqualified run 2
- DNS = Did Not Start
- Updated at 18 March 2018, after all events.

== See also ==
- 2018 Alpine Skiing World Cup – Women's summary rankings
- 2018 Alpine Skiing World Cup – Women's overall
- 2018 Alpine Skiing World Cup – Women's downhill
- 2018 Alpine Skiing World Cup – Women's super-G
- 2018 Alpine Skiing World Cup – Women's giant slalom
- 2018 Alpine Skiing World Cup – Women's combined
