= FIS Alpine World Ski Championships 2017 – Women's slalom =

Women's slalom at the FIS Alpine World Ski Championships 2017
- Venue: Piz Nair
- Location: St. Moritz, Switzerland
- Dates: 18 February
- Competitors: 94 from 52 nations
- Winning time: 1:37.27

Medalists
gold medal	Mikaela Shiffrin	United States
silver medal	Wendy Holdener	Switzerland
bronze medal	Frida Hansdotter	Sweden

The Women's slalom competition at the 2017 World Championships was held on 18 February 2017.

A qualification was held on 17 February 2017.

== Results ==
The first run was started at 09:45 and the second run at 13:00.

Rank	Bib	Name	Nation	Run 1	Rank	Run 2	Rank	Total	Diff
1st place, gold medalist(s)	1	Mikaela Shiffrin	United States	47.80	1	49.47	1	1:37.27	
2nd place, silver medalist(s)	7	Wendy Holdener	Switzerland	48.18	2	50.73	8	1:38.91	+1.64
3rd place, bronze medalist(s)	3	Frida Hansdotter	Sweden	48.57	5	50.45	3	1:39.02	+1.75
4	4	Petra Vlhová	Slovakia	48.56	4	50.60	4	1:39.16	+1.89
5	6	Šárka Strachová	Czech Republic	49.00	9	50.32	2	1:39.32	+2.05
6	10	Michaela Kirchgasser	Austria	48.75	7	50.74	9	1:39.49	+2.22
7	17	Ana Bucik	Slovenia	48.76	8	51.13	19	1:39.89	+2.62
8	19	Emelie Wikström	Sweden	49.49	14	50.71	7	1:40.20	+2.93
9	27	Denise Feierabend	Switzerland	49.61	16	50.62	5	1:40.23	+2.96
10	9	Bernadette Schild	Austria	49.41	12	50.83	11	1:40.24	+2.97
11	14	Resi Stiegler	United States	49.38	11	51.03	16	1:40.41	+3.14
12	23	Nastasia Noens	France	49.75	18	50.78	10	1:40.53	+3.26
13	18	Maren Skjøld	Norway	49.60	15	50.99	15	1:40.59	+3.32
14	15	Maria Pietilä-Holmner	Sweden	49.97	23	50.63	6	1:40.60	+3.33
15	22	Erin Mielzynski	Canada	49.74	17	50.88	13	1:40.62	+3.35
16	32	Anna Swenn-Larsson	Sweden	49.84	21	50.85	12	1:40.69	+3.42
17	38	Marina Wallner	Germany	49.81	20	50.89	14	1:40.70	+3.43
18	16	Lena Dürr	Germany	49.16	10	51.61	22	1:40.77	+3.50
19	13	Katharina Truppe	Austria	49.80	19	51.10	17	1:40.90	+3.63
20	8	Marie-Michèle Gagnon	Canada	49.48	13	51.77	24	1:41.25	+3.98
21	11	Michelle Gisin	Switzerland	48.66	6	52.86	31	1:41.52	+4.25
22	40	Jessica Hilzinger	Germany	50.43	24	51.22	20	1:41.65	+4.38
23	25	Anne-Sophie Barthet	France	50.70	28	51.12	18	1:41.82	+4.55
24	31	Federica Brignone	Italy	50.60	26	51.73	23	1:42.33	+5.06
25	39	Alexandra Tilley	Great Britain	50.66	27	52.06	25	1:42.72	+5.45
26	2	Nina Løseth	Norway	51.70	38	51.27	21	1:42.97	+5.70
27	34	Ali Nullmeyer	Canada	51.03	31	52.13	26	1:43.16	+5.89
28	45	Andrea Komšić	Croatia	51.36	35	52.30	27	1:43.66	+6.39
29	35	Ekaterina Tkachenko	Russia	51.08	32	52.79	30	1:43.87	+6.60
30	51	Adriana Jelinkova	Netherlands	51.38	36	52.65	28	1:44.03	+6.76
31	53	Maria Shkanova	Belarus	51.35	34	52.96	32	1:44.31	+7.04
32	41	Martina Dubovská	Czech Republic	51.82	41	52.68	29	1:44.50	+7.23
33	49	Gabriela Capová	Czech Republic	51.71	39	53.06	33	1:44.77	+7.50
34	46	Mireia Gutiérrez	Andorra	51.75	40	53.11	34	1:44.86	+7.59
35	37	Merle Soppela	Finland	51.55	37	53.49	35	1:45.04	+7.77
36	52	Megan McJames	United States	52.11	43	53.69	36	1:45.80	+8.53
37	65	Agnese Āboltiņa	Latvia	52.60	49	53.70	37	1:46.30	+9.03
38	44	Emiko Kiyosawa	Japan	52.23	47	54.27	39	1:46.50	+9.23
39	54	Salomé Báncora	Argentina	52.76	50	53.81	38	1:46.57	+9.30
40	62	Marjolein Decroix	Belgium	52.20	46	55.02	41	1:47.22	+9.95
41	59	Macarena Simari Birkner	Argentina	52.46	48	55.35	42	1:47.81	+10.54
42	57	Kim Vanreusel	Belgium	53.75	54	54.58	40	1:48.33	+11.06
43	70	Tereza Jančová	Slovakia	53.43	53	55.36	43	1:48.79	+11.52
44	72	Klaudia Nemcová	Slovakia	54.88	56	56.16	44	1:51.04	+13.77
45	60	Maria Kirkova	Bulgaria	53.85	55	57.28	45	1:51.13	+13.86
46	69	Nino Tsiklauri	Georgia	54.88	56	58.75	48	1:53.63	+16.36
47	74	Charlotte Techen Lemgart	Denmark	55.88	58	57.89	46	1:53.77	+16.50
48	77	Sophia Ralli	Greece	56.57	60	58.09	47	1:54.66	+17.39
49	81	Olha Knysh	Ukraine	56.10	59	58.89	49	1:54.99	+17.72
—	5	Veronika Velez-Zuzulová	Slovakia	48.39	3	DNF			
—	28	Adeline Baud Mugnier	France	49.92	22	DNF			
—	29	Maruša Ferk	Slovenia	53.21	51	DNF			
—	30	Katharina Gallhuber	Austria	50.56	25	DNF			
—	33	Nevena Ignjatović	Serbia	50.71	29	DNF			
—	36	Ksenia Alopina	Russia	52.11	43	DNF			
—	47	Lelde Gasūna	Latvia	52.11	43	DNF			
—	55	Riikka Honkanen	Finland	52.06	42	DNF			
—	56	Mikaela Tommy	Canada	51.33	33	DNF			
—	67	Maryna Gąsienica-Daniel	Poland	50.90	30	DNF			
—	68	Vera Asenova	Bulgaria	53.35	52	DNF			
—	76	Sabrina Simader	Kenya	57.21	61	DNQ			
—	79	Maria Samarinou	Greece	57.58	62	DNQ			
—	75	Tess Arbez	Ireland	57.73	63	DNQ			
—	85	Catherine Elvinger	Luxembourg	58.49	64	DNQ			
—	78	Ni Yueming	China	1:00.11	65	DNQ			
—	73	Elvedina Muzaferija	Bosnia and Herzegovina	1:00.69	66	DNQ			
—	64	Mathilde Nelles	Belgium	1:02.48	67	DNQ			
—	91	Atefeh Ahmadi	Iran	1:03.21	68	DNQ			
—	89	Laetitia El Khoury	Lebanon	1:04.35	69	DNQ			
—	86	Elise Pellegrin	Malta	1:04.36	70	DNQ			
—	93	Catarina Carvalho	Portugal	1:11.94	71	DNQ			
—	90	Rachel Elizabeth Olivier	South Africa	1:16.25	72	DNQ			
—	94	Céline Marti	Haiti	1:27.81	73	DNQ			
—	12	Chiara Costazza	Italy	DNF					
—	20	Christina Geiger	Germany	DNF					
—	21	Irene Curtoni	Italy	DNF					
—	26	Manuela Mölgg	Italy	DNF					
—	42	Asa Ando	Japan	DNF					
—	43	Laurie Mougel	France	DNF					
—	48	Kateřina Pauláthová	Czech Republic	DNF					
—	50	Leona Popović	Croatia	DNF					
—	58	Freydis-Halla Einarsdóttir	Iceland	DNF					
—	61	Sarah Schleper	Mexico	DNF					
—	63	Liene Bondare	Latvia	DNF					
—	66	Piera Hudson	New Zealand	DNF					
—	71	Raluca Georgiana Ciocanel	Romania	DNF					
—	80	Ieva Januškevičiūtė	Lithuania	DNF					
—	82	Chiara Archam	Hungary	DNF					
—	84	Ornella Oettl Reyes	Peru	DNF					
—	87	Ivana Bulatović	Montenegro	DNF					
—	88	Kseniya Grigoreva	Uzbekistan	DNF					
—	92	Lidija Simjanovska	Macedonia	DNF					
—	24	Mélanie Meillard	Switzerland	DSQ					
—	83	Suela Mëhilli	Albania	DSQ					
