= FIS Alpine World Ski Championships 2015 – Women's giant slalom =

Women's giant slalom at the FIS Alpine World Ski Championships 2015
- Venue: Raptor; Beaver Creek, Colorado, United States
- Date: 12 February 2015
- Competitors: 116 from 51 nations
- Winning time: 2:19.16

Medalists
gold medal	Anna Fenninger	Austria
silver medal	Viktoria Rebensburg	Germany
bronze medal	Jessica Lindell-Vikarby	Sweden

The women's giant slalom competition at the 2015 World Championships was held on 12 February 2015.

== Results ==
The first run was started at 10:15 local time (UTC−7) and the second run at 14:15.

Rank	Bib	Name	Nation	Run 1	Rank	Run 2	Rank	Total	Diff
1st place, gold medalist(s)	7	Anna Fenninger	Austria	1:08.98	1	1:10.18	2	2:19.16	
2nd place, silver medalist(s)	14	Viktoria Rebensburg	Germany	1:10.68	11	1:09.88	1	2:20.56	+1.40
3rd place, bronze medalist(s)	5	Jessica Lindell-Vikarby	Sweden	1:09.88	3	1:10.77	6	2:20.65	+1.49
4	8	Tina Weirather	Liechtenstein	1:10.33	5	1:10.38	3	2:20.71	+1.55
5	2	Tina Maze	Slovenia	1:10.08	4	1:10.82	7	2:20.90	+1.74
6	19	Michaela Kirchgasser	Austria	1:09.79	2	1:11.12	11	2:20.91	+1.75
7	6	Kathrin Zettel	Austria	1:10.70	13	1:10.61	4	2:21.31	+2.15
8	3	Mikaela Shiffrin	United States	1:10.70	13	1:10.93	9	2:21.63	+2.47
9	1	Maria Pietilä-Holmner	Sweden	1:10.63	9	1:11.21	12	2:21.84	+2.68
10	15	Sara Hector	Sweden	1:10.67	10	1:11.29	13	2:21.96	+2.80
11	18	Nina Løseth	Norway	1:10.38	6	1:11.61	21	2:21.99	+2.83
12	16	Frida Hansdotter	Sweden	1:10.69	12	1:11.45	17	2:22.14	+2.98
13	12	Tessa Worley	France	1:11.38	20	1:10.89	8	2:22.27	+3.11
14	31	Lindsey Vonn	United States	1:11.65	27	1:10.73	5	2:22.38	+3.22
15	24	Adeline Baud	France	1:11.37	19	1:11.06	10	2:22.43	+3.27
16	11	Nadia Fanchini	Italy	1:11.30	18	1:11.33	16	2:22.63	+3.47
17	30	Wendy Holdener	Switzerland	1:10.97	15	1:11.73	24	2:22.70	+3.54
18	20	Ragnhild Mowinckel	Norway	1:11.52	23	1:11.29	13	2:22.81	+3.65
19	17	Dominique Gisin	Switzerland	1:11.57	26	1:11.31	15	2:22.88	+3.72
20	21	Manuela Mölgg	Italy	1:11.18	16	1:11.77	25	2:22.95	+3.79
21	28	Katarina Lavtar	Slovenia	1:11.39	21	1:11.60	20	2:22.99	+3.83
22	34	Mikaela Tommy	Canada	1:11.54	24	1:11.55	19	2:23.09	+3.93
23	23	Marie-Michèle Gagnon	Canada	1:11.54	24	1:11.63	22	2:23.17	+4.01
24	25	Ana Drev	Slovenia	1:11.42	22	1:11.92	28	2:23.34	+4.18
25	43	Ilka Štuhec	Slovenia	1:11.67	28	1:11.88	27	2:23.55	+4.39
26	26	Julia Mancuso	United States	1:11.81	29	1:11.98	29	2:23.79	+4.63
27	22	Marie-Pier Préfontaine	Canada	1:12.63	31	1:11.51	18	2:24.14	+4.98
28	33	Emi Hasegawa	Japan	1:12.49	30	1:11.85	26	2:24.34	+5.18
29	36	Candace Crawford	Canada	1:12.82	34	1:11.63	22	2:24.45	+5.29
30	49	Petra Vlhová	Slovakia	1:12.98	35	1:12.71	31	2:25.69	+6.53
31	39	Merle Soppela	Finland	1:12.79	33	1:12.93	32	2:25.72	+6.56
32	41	Michelle Gisin	Switzerland	1:12.69	32	1:13.40	34	2:26.09	+6.93
33	35	Anastasia Romanova	Russia	1:13.57	37	1:12.62	30	2:26.19	+7.03
34	38	Megan McJames	United States	1:13.58	38	1:13.27	33	2:26.85	+7.69
35	32	Alexandra Tilley	Great Britain	1:13.61	39	1:13.45	35	2:27.06	+7.90
36	37	Greta Small	Australia	1:13.16	36	1:14.22	40	2:27.38	+8.22
37	42	Leona Popović	Croatia	1:13.72	40	1:13.85	38	2:27.57	+8.41
38	51	Iva Mišak	Croatia	1:13.85	41	1:13.91	39	2:27.76	+8.60
38	44	Maryna Gąsienica-Daniel	Poland	1:14.05	44	1:13.71	37	2:27.76	+8.60
40	63	Edit Miklós	Hungary	1:14.43	45	1:13.47	36	2:27.90	+8.74
41	67	Maria Kirkova	Bulgaria	1:13.90	43	1:14.31	41	2:28.21	+9.05
42	48	Nevena Ignjatović	Serbia	1:13.86	42	1:14.57	45	2:28.43	+9.27
43	45	Charlie Guest	Great Britain	1:15.27	47	1:14.47	43	2:29.74	+10.58
44	56	Andrea Komšić	Croatia	1:15.43	49	1:14.56	44	2:29.99	+10.83
45	59	Lavinia Chrystal	Australia	1:15.54	50	1:15.14	46	2:30.68	+11.52
46	50	Salomé Báncora	Argentina	1:14.54	46	1:16.41	51	2:30.95	+11.79
47	52	María Belén Simari Birkner	Argentina	1:16.26	55	1:15.26	47	2:31.52	+12.36
47	46	Noelle Barahona	Chile	1:15.77	53	1:15.75	48	2:31.52	+12.36
49	70	Bogdana Matsotska	Ukraine	1:15.31	48	1:16.28	50	2:31.59	+12.43
50	54	Sarah Schleper	Mexico	1:17.34	57	1:14.39	42	2:31.73	+12.57
51	61	Angélica Simari Birkner	Argentina	1:15.68	51	1:17.14	53	2:32.82	+13.66
52	57	Saša Tršinski	Croatia	1:16.11	54	1:16.77	52	2:32.88	+13.72
53	68	Žana Novaković	Bosnia and Herzegovina	1:16.93	56	1:16.06	49	2:32.99	+13.83
54	62	Ania Monica Caill	Romania	1:17.54	58	1:17.40	54	2:34.94	+15.78
55	69	Gabriela Capová	Czech Republic	1:17.73	59	1:17.62	55	2:35.35	+16.19
56	55	Helga María Vilhjálmsdóttir	Iceland	1:17.86	60	1:17.68	56	2:35.54	+16.38
	47	Kristiina Rove	Finland	1:15.68	51	DNF			
	40	Kateřina Pauláthová	Czech Republic	1:11.19	17	DNF			
	27	Marta Bassino	Italy	1:10.51	8	DNF			
	29	Taïna Barioz	France	1:10.50	7	DNF			
61	58	Nicol Gastaldi	Argentina	1:18.01	61				
62	75	Freydís Halla Einarsdóttir	Iceland	1:18.14	62				
63	64	Nino Tsiklauri	Georgia	1:18.23	63				
64	77	Mathilde Nelles	Belgium	1:18.35	64				
65	60	Yina Moe-Lange	Denmark	1:18.66	65				
66	72	Tetyana Tikun	Ukraine	1:18.88	66				
67	87	Agnese Āboltiņa	Latvia	1:18.94	67				
68	78	Evelina Gasūna	Latvia	1:19.68	68				
69	80	Tess Arbez	Ireland	1:20.75	69				
70	84	Olha Knysh	Ukraine	1:21.13	70				
71	66	Charlotte Techen Lemgart	Denmark	1:21.22	71				
72	82	Erla Ásgeirsdóttir	Iceland	1:22.08	72				
73	65	Anna Berecz	Hungary	1:22.48	73				
74	88	Amira Halilović	Bosnia and Herzegovina	1:22.95	74				
75	97	Ornella Oettl Reyes	Peru	1:22.99	75				
76	94	Elise Pellegrin	Malta	1:23.17	76				
77	91	Suela Mëhilli	Albania	1:24.27	77				
78	83	Liene Bondare	Latvia	1:24.35	78				
79	90	Magdalena Pfingsthorn	Chile	1:24.46	79				
80	76	Xia Lina	China	1:24.50	80				
81	100	Gitit Buchler	Israel	1:24.73	81				
82	86	Nuunu Chemnitz Bertelsen	Denmark	1:25.64	82				
83	79	Florence Bell	Ireland	1:27.21	83				
84	108	Mónika Maróty	Hungary	1:27.58	84				
85	99	Maria Samarinou	Greece	1:27.67	85				
86	104	Anastasia Gkogkou	Greece	1:27.74	86				
87	96	Sophia Ralli	Greece	1:28.01	87				
88	92	Lisa Christine Blunck Moe	Denmark	1:29.50	88				
89	85	Qin Xiyue	China	1:30.00	89				
90	98	Anastasia Kokkini	Greece	1:30.24	90				
91	111	Lea Nassar	Lebanon	1:30.79	91				
92	106	Olga Paliutkina	Kyrgyzstan	1:31.10	92				
93	110	Yasma Haddad	Lebanon	1:34.08	93				
94	112	Celine Keirouz	Lebanon	1:37.90	94				
95	109	Aanchal Thakur	India	1:42.79	95				
96	115	Varsha Devi	India	2:02.51	96				
	53	Piera Hudson	New Zealand	DNS					
	107	Maša Janković	Serbia	DNS					
	114	Wu Meng-chien	Chinese Taipei	DNS					
	4	Eva-Maria Brem	Austria	DNF					
	9	Lara Gut	Switzerland	DNF					
	10	Anémone Marmottan	France	DNF					
	13	Federica Brignone	Italy	DNF					
	73	Maya Harrisson	Brazil	DNF					
	74	Šejla Merdanović	Bosnia and Herzegovina	DNF					
	81	Ronnie Kiek	Israel	DNF					
	89	Josefina Vicuña	Chile	DNF					
	95	Ieva Januškevičiūtė	Lithuania	DNF					
	101	Réka Csima	Hungary	DNF					
	103	Natacha Mohbat	Lebanon	DNF					
	116	Nina Mandić	Serbia	DNF					
	71	Lelde Gasūna	Latvia	DQ					
	93	Kseniya Grigoreva	Uzbekistan	DQ					
	102	Catherine Elvinger	Luxembourg	DQ					
	105	Ivana Bulatović	Montenegro	DQ					
	113	Tatjana Baranova	Uzbekistan	DQ					
