= FIS Alpine World Ski Championships 2015 – Women's slalom =

Women's slalom at the FIS Alpine World Ski Championships 2015
- Venue: Birds of Prey; Beaver Creek, Colorado, U.S.
- Date: February 14, 2015
- Competitors: 118 from 50 nations
- Winning time: 1:38.48

Medalists
gold medal	Mikaela Shiffrin	United States
silver medal	Frida Hansdotter	Sweden
bronze medal	Šárka Strachová	Czech Republic

The women's slalom competition at the 2015 World Championships was held on Saturday, February 14. Mikaela Shiffrin successfully defended her world title in her hometown.

== Results ==
The first run was started at 10:15 MST (UTC−7) and the second run at 14:15.

Rank	Bib	Name	Nation	Run_{1}	Rank	Run_{2}	Rank	Total	Diff
1st place, gold medalist(s)	2	Mikaela Shiffrin	United States	50.07	1	48.41	4	1:38.48	
2nd place, silver medalist(s)	4	Frida Hansdotter	Sweden	50.47	2	48.35	2	1:38.82	+0.34
3rd place, bronze medalist(s)	6	Šárka Strachová	Czech Republic	50.51	3	48.74	5	1:39.25	+0.77
4	12	Veronika Velez-Zuzulová	Slovakia	51.25	10	48.17	1	1:39.42	+0.94
5	3	Kathrin Zettel	Austria	51.10	9	48.40	3	1:39.50	+1.02
6	18	Erin Mielzynski	Canada	50.94	6	49.04	8	1:39.98	+1.50
7	17	Carmen Thalmann	Austria	51.01	7	49.51	15	1:40.52	+2.04
8	1	Tina Maze	Slovenia	50.92	5	50.04	20	1:40.96	+2.48
9	15	Nastasia Noens	France	52.20	18	48.97	6	1:41.17	+2.69
10	11	Marie-Michèle Gagnon	Canada	51.62	14	49.79	18	1:41.41	+2.93
11	9	Nina Løseth	Norway	51.50	13	49.93	19	1:41.43	+2.95
12	33	Maren Wiesler	Germany	51.91	15	49.61	16	1:41.52	+3.04
13	24	Lena Dürr	Germany	52.16	17	49.38	11	1:41.54	+3.06
14	5	Maria Pietilä Holmner	Sweden	52.20	18	49.47	12	1:41.67	+3.19
15	34	Charlotte Chable	Switzerland	52.72	26	49.01	7	1:41.73	+3.25
16	14	Chiara Costazza	Italy	52.41	22	49.50	14	1:41.91	+3.43
17	20	Laurie Mougel	France	52.38	20	49.65	17	1:42.03	+3.55
18	31	Emi Hasegawa	Japan	52.65	24	49.48	13	1:42.13	+3.65
19	27	Federica Brignone	Italy	52.90	28	49.29	10	1:42.19	+3.71
20	32	Paula Moltzan	United States	53.04	30	49.18	9	1:42.22	+3.74
21	35	Merle Soppela	Finland	52.71	25	50.09	21	1:42.80	+4.32
22	8	Anna Swenn-Larsson	Sweden	51.29	11	51.55	32	1:42.84	+4.36
23	23	Sara Hector	Sweden	52.39	21	50.64	24	1:43.03	+4.55
24	43	Alexandra Tilley	Great Britain	53.11	32	50.34	22	1:43.45	+4.97
25	29	Mireia Gutiérrez	Andorra	53.56	36	50.44	23	1:44.00	+5.52
26	26	Taina Barioz	France	53.09	31	51.03	28	1:44.12	+5.64
27	40	Leona Popović	Croatia	53.59	37	51.14	29	1:44.73	+6.25
28	36	Hailey Duke	United States	53.66	38	51.29	31	1:44.95	+6.47
29	38	Katarina Lavtar	Slovenia	53.98	39	51.00	27	1:44.98	+6.50
30	37	Candace Crawford	Canada	54.02	40	50.99	26	1:45.01	+6.53
31	46	Karen Persyn	Belgium	54.27	42	50.91	25	1:45.18	+6.70
32	49	Charlie Guest	Great Britain	54.03	41	52.04	33	1:46.07	+7.59
33	42	Sofija Novoselić	Croatia	55.65	45	51.27	30	1:46.92	+8.44
34	55	Macarena Simari Birkner	Argentina	55.67	46	52.20	34	1:47.87	+9.39
35	62	Maryna Gąsienica-Daniel	Poland	55.41	44	52.61	35	1:48.02	+9.54
36	59	María Guðmundsdóttir	Iceland	55.78	48	52.62	36	1:48.40	+9.92
37	53	Salome Bancora	Argentina	55.70	47	53.16	37	1:48.86	+10.38
38	44	Megan McJames	United States	54.82	43	54.29	42	1:49.11	+10.63
39	64	Piera Hudson	New Zealand	56.02	50	53.58	39	1:49.60	+11.12
40	75	Šejla Merdanović	Bosnia and Herzegovina	56.11	51	54.01	41	1:50.12	+11.64
40	61	Bohdana Matsotska	Ukraine	56.56	52	53.56	38	1:50.12	+11.64
42	60	Helga María Vilhjálmsdóttir	Iceland	57.60	56	53.92	40	1:51.52	+13.04
43	74	Agnese Āboltiņa	Latvia	56.63	54	54.92	43	1:51.55	+13.07
44	25	Petra Vlhová	Slovakia	53.12	33	58.83	48	1:51.95	+13.47
45	70	Erla Ásgeirsdóttir	Iceland	57.87	59	55.06	44	1:52.93	+14.45
45	58	Lavinia Chrystal	Australia	57.64	57	55.29	45	1:52.93	+14.45
47	72	Mathilde Nelles	Belgium	57.48	55	55.63	46	1:53.11	+14.63
48	76	Nino Tsiklauri	Georgia	58.15	60	56.48	47	1:54.63	+16.15
	13	Wendy Holdener	Switzerland	51.09	8	DNF			
	7	Nicole Hosp	Austria	51.46	12	DNF			
	16	Michelle Gisin	Switzerland	52.07	16	DNF			
	28	Ana Bucik	Slovenia	52.55	23	DNF			
	22	Adeline Baud	France	52.80	27	DNF			
	45	Ksenia Alopina	Russia	53.02	29	DNF			
	10	Michaela Kirchgasser	Austria	50.84	4	DNF			
	21	Manuela Mölgg	Italy	53.13	34	DNF			
	56	Gabriela Capová	Czech Republic	56.56	52	DNF			
	52	Kristiina Rove	Finland	57.64	57	DNF			
	19	Resi Stiegler	United States	53.42	35	DNS			
	41	Greta Small	Australia	55.88	49	DNS			
61	67	Angélica Simari Birkner	Argentina	58.25	61				
62	69	Charlotte Lemgart	Denmark	58.33	62				
63	71	Freydis-Halla Einarsdóttir	Iceland	58.69	63				
64	87	Tess Arbez	Ireland	58.90	64				
65	65	Noelle Barahona	Chile	59.20	65				
66	73	Anna Berecz	Hungary	1:00.68	66				
67	79	Olha Knysh	Ukraine	1:00.94	67				
68	82	Sophia Ralli	Greece	1:01.08	68				
69	81	Elise Pelelgrin	Malta	1:02.20	69				
70	92	Catherine Elvinger	Luxembourg	1:02.47	70				
71	90	Ieva Januškevičiūtė	Lithuania	1:02.61	71				
72	91	Ieva Meldere	Latvia	1:02.93	72				
73	89	Nuunu Berthelsen	Denmark	1:03.75	73				
74	110	Laura Csima	Hungary	1:04.13	74				
75	94	Suela Mehilli	Albania	1:04.52	75				
76	104	Magdalena Pfingsthorn	Chile	1:05.22	76				
77	98	Anastasia Gkogkou	Greece	1:05.35	77				
78	93	Qin Xiyue	China	1:05.41	78				
79	99	Anastasia Kokkini	Greece	1:07.64	79				
80	106	Natacha Mohbat	Lebanon	1:09.11	80				
81	102	Ivana Bulatović	Montenegro	1:09.89	81				
82	120	Patricia Eigler	Hungary	1:11.65	82				
83	112	Olga Paliutkina	Kyrgyzstan	1:15.98	83				
84	118	Tatjana Baranova	Uzbekistan	1:24.48	84				
85	117	Varsha Devi	India	1:32.65	85				
86	119	Wu Meng-chien	Chinese Taipei	1:53.37	86				
	30	Martina Dubovská	Czech Republic	DNS					
	48	Adriana Jelinkova	Netherlands	DNS					
	39	Nevena Ignjatović	Serbia	DNF					
	47	Iva Mišak	Croatia	DNF					
	50	Kateřina Pauláthová	Czech Republic	DNF					
	51	Andrea Komšić	Croatia	DNF					
	54	Lelde Gasūna	Latvia	DNF					
	57	Nicol Gastaldi	Argentina	DNF					
	63	Maria Kirkova	Bulgaria	DNF					
	66	Marjolein Decroix	Belgium	DNF					
	68	Žana Novaković	Bosnia and Herzegovina	DNF					
	77	Sarah Schleper	Mexico	DNF					
	78	Evelina Gasuna	Latvia	DNF					
	80	Florence Bell	Ireland	DNF					
	83	Maya Harrisson	Brazil	DNF					
	84	Tetyana Tikun	Ukraine	DNF					
	85	Victoria Bell	Ireland	DNF					
	86	Xia Lina	China	DNF					
	88	Maria Samarinou	Greece	DNF					
	95	Maša Janković	Serbia	DNF					
	96	Ornella Oettl Reyes	Peru	DNF					
	97	Ronnie Kiek	Israel	DNF					
	100	Amira Halilović	Bosnia and Herzegovina	DNF					
	101	Kseniya Grigoreva	Uzbekistan	DNF					
	103	Lisa Moe	Denmark	DNF					
	105	Gitit Buchler	Israel	DNF					
	107	Josefina Vicuna	Chile	DNF					
	108	Barbara Bogdanović	Serbia	DNF					
	109	Réka Berecz	Hungary	DNF					
	111	Nina Mandić	Serbia	DNF					
	113	Lea Nassar	Lebanon	DNF					
	114	Celine Keirouz	Lebanon	DNF					
	115	Aanchal Thakur	India	DNF					
	116	Yasma Haddad	Lebanon	DNF					
