= FIS Alpine World Ski Championships 2019 – Women's slalom =

FIS Alpine World Ski Championships 2019

Women's slalom at the FIS Alpine World Ski Championships 2019
- Venue: Åre ski resort
- Location: Åre, Sweden
- Dates: 16 February
- Competitors: 97 from 45 nations
- Winning time: 1:57.05

Medalists
gold medal	Mikaela Shiffrin	United States
silver medal	Anna Swenn-Larsson	Sweden
bronze medal	Petra Vlhová	Slovakia

The Women's slalom competition at the FIS Alpine World Ski Championships 2019 was held on 16 February 2019. A qualification was scheduled to take place on 15 February, but was cancelled.

== Results ==
Run 1 was started at 11:00 and run 2 at 14:30.

Rank	Bib	Name	Nation	Run 1	Rank	Run 2	Rank	Total	Diff
1st place, gold medalist(s)	2	Mikaela Shiffrin	United States	57.23	3	59.82	1	1:57.05	
2nd place, silver medalist(s)	4	Anna Swenn-Larsson	Sweden	57.19	2	1:00.44	2	1:57.63	+ 0.58
3rd place, bronze medalist(s)	6	Petra Vlhová	Slovakia	57.54	5	1:00.54	3	1:58.08	+ 1.03
4	1	Katharina Liensberger	Austria	57.35	4	1:01.13	7	1:58.48	+ 1.43
5	7	Frida Hansdotter	Sweden	57.64	6	1:01.80	17	1:59.44	+ 2.39
6	8	Laurence St. Germain	Canada	58.60	8	1:01.05	4	1:59.65	+ 2.60
7	19	Katharina Huber	Austria	58.66	9	1:01.19	8	1:59.85	+ 2.80
8	10	Katharina Truppe	Austria	58.93	10	1:01.05	4	1:59.98	+ 2.93
9	5	Bernadette Schild	Austria	59.20	12	1:01.26	9	2:00.46	+ 3.41
10	11	Erin Mielzynski	Canada	58.99	11	1:01.60	12	2:00.59	+ 3.54
11	18	Lena Dürr	Germany	59.83	15	1:01.47	11	2:01.30	+ 4.25
12	16	Roni Remme	Canada	59.36	13	1:02.02	19	2:01.38	+ 4.33
13	9	Nastasia Noens	France	59.91	16	1:01.62	13	2:01.53	+ 4.48
14	25	Charlotta Säfvenberg	Sweden	1:00.21	18	1:01.98	18	2:02.19	+ 5.14
15	17	Aline Danioth	Switzerland	1:00.15	17	1:02.07	21	2:02.22	+ 5.17
16	24	Maren Skjøld	Norway	1:00.87	23	1:01.40	10	2:02.27	+ 5.22
17	3	Wendy Holdener	Switzerland	57.08	1	1:05.23	32	2:02.31	+ 5.26
18	21	Paula Moltzan	United States	1:00.46	21	1:02.05	20	2:02.51	+ 5.46
19	39	Adriana Jelinkova	Netherlands	1:01.45	25	1:01.07	6	2:02.52	+ 5.47
20	14	Chiara Costazza	Italy	1:00.36	20	1:02.37	22	2:02.73	+ 5.68
21	36	Gabriela Capová	Czech Republic	1:00.60	22	1:02.45	23	2:03.05	+ 6.00
22	43	Amelia Smart	Canada	1:01.58	28	1:01.76	16	2:03.34	+ 6.29
23	34	Mireia Gutiérrez	Andorra	1:01.70	29	1:01.67	15	2:03.37	+ 6.32
24	42	Charlie Guest	Great Britain	1:01.82	30	1:01.63	14	2:03.45	+ 6.40
25	38	Maria Shkanova	Belarus	1:01.52	27	1:02.51	24	2:04.03	+ 6.98
26	45	Ekaterina Tkachenko	Russia	1:02.64	33	1:02.52	25	2:05.16	+8.11
27	23	Maruša Ferk	Slovenia	1:02.09	31	1:03.81	28	2:05.90	+8.85
28	49	Nevena Ignjatović	Serbia	1:02.94	36	1:03.09	27	2:06.03	+8.98
29	37	Kristine Gjelsten Haugen	Norway	1:02.28	32	1:04.55	30	2:06.83	+9.78
30	47	Andrea Komšić	Croatia	1:04.00	39	1:03.06	26	2:07.06	+10.01
31	30	Nella Korpio	Finland	1:02.91	35	1:04.28	29	2:07.19	+10.14
32	55	Kim Vanreusel	Belgium	1:03.76	38	1:04.69	31	2:08.45	+11.40
33	46	Ksenia Alopina	Russia	1:03.19	37	1:05.29	33	2:08.48	+11.43
34	41	Nina O'Brien	United States	1:01.45	25	1:08.22	34	2:09.67	+ 12.62
35	57	Freydís Halla Einarsdóttir	Iceland	1:05.64	40	1:09.29	35	2:14.93	+17.88
36	60	Nuunu Chemnitz Berthelsen	Denmark	1:08.13	44	1:09.87	36	2:18.00	+20.95
37	63	Vanina Guerillot	Portugal	1:07.82	43	1:10.64	39	2:18.46	+21.41
38	67	María Finnbogadóttir	Iceland	1:08.82	45	1:10.06	37	2:18.88	+21.83
39	65	Andrea Björk Birkisdóttir	Iceland	1:09.55	48	1:10.36	38	2:19.91	+22.86
40	62	Mialitiana Clerc	Madagascar	1:08.96	46	1:11.29	41	2:20.25	+23.20
41	68	Anastasiya Shepilenko	Ukraine	1:09.22	47	1:11.33	42	2:20.55	+23.50
42	69	Ieva Januškevičiūtė	Lithuania	1:09.62	49	1:11.25	40	2:20.87	+23.82
43	64	Tess Arbez	Ireland	1:11.57	50	1:13.35	43	2:24.92	+27.87
44	80	Katalin Dorultán	Hungary	1:12.23	51	1:14.28	44	2:26.51	+29.46
45	74	Sophia Ralli	Greece	1:12.89	52	1:14.83	45	2:27.72	+30.67
46	85	Atefeh Ahmadi	Iran	1:15.35	53	1:16.66	47	2:32.01	+34.96
47	84	Mimi Maroty	Hungary	1:16.96	54	1:16.54	46	2:33.50	+36.45
48	82	Forough Abbasi	Iran	1:20.79	55	1:19.28	48	2:40.07	+43.02
49	90	Jackie Chamoun	Lebanon	1:23.31	58	1:21.11	49	2:44.42	+47.37
50	94	Sara Zeidan	Lebanon	1:22.71	57	1:22.80	50	2:45.51	+48.46
51	96	Adea Kollqaku	Kosovo	1:37.36	59	1:33.31	51	3:10.67	+1:13.62
52	97	Celine Marti	Haiti	1:46.28	60	1:47.71	52	3:33.99	+1:36.94
—	56	Marjolein Decroix	Belgium	1:06.08	42	Did not finish			
—	54	Lelde Gasūna	Latvia	1:05.95	41	Did not finish			
—	28	Lara Della Mea	Italy	1:01.14	24	Did not finish			
—	26	Ana Bucik	Slovenia	1:00.25	19	Did not finish			
—	15	Christina Geiger	Germany	58.59	7	Did not finish			
—	12	Kristin Lysdahl	Norway	59.51	14	Did not finish			
—	87	Marjan Kalhor	Iran	1:22.41	56	Did not start			
—	33	Martina Dubovská	Czech Republic	1:02.80	34	Did not start			
—	13	Irene Curtoni	Italy	Did not finish					
—	20	Mina Fürst Holtmann	Norway	Did not finish					
—	27	Ylva Stålnacke	Sweden	Did not finish					
—	29	Elena Stoffel	Switzerland	Did not finish					
—	31	Josephine Forni	France	Did not finish					
—	32	Marlene Schmotz	Germany	Did not finish					
—	35	Sakurako Mukogawa	Japan	Did not finish					
—	40	Neja Dvornik	Slovenia	Did not finish					
—	44	Anastasia Gornostaeva	Russia	Did not finish					
—	48	Piera Hudson	New Zealand	Did not finish					
—	50	Riikka Honkanen	Finland	Did not finish					
—	51	Nuria Pau	Spain	Did not finish					
—	52	Erika Pykäläinen	Finland	Did not finish					
—	53	Agnese Āboltiņa	Latvia	Did not finish					
—	58	Evelīna Gasūna	Latvia	Did not finish					
—	59	Liene Bondare	Latvia	Did not finish					
—	61	Nino Tsiklauri	Georgia	Did not finish					
—	66	Hólmfríður Dóra Friðgeirsdóttir	Iceland	Did not finish					
—	70	Olha Knysh	Ukraine	Did not finish					
—	71	Victoria Bolješić	Serbia	Did not finish					
—	72	Kong Fanying	China	Did not finish					
—	75	Maja Tadić	Bosnia and Herzegovina	Did not finish					
—	76	Šejla Merdanović	Bosnia and Herzegovina	Did not finish					
—	77	Petra Veljković	Serbia	Did not finish					
—	78	Ornella Oettl Reyes	Peru	Did not finish					
—	79	Ni Yueming	China	Did not finish					
—	81	Zhu Tianhui	China	Did not finish					
—	83	Mariya Grigorova	Kazakhstan	Did not finish					
—	86	Aristi Kyritsi	Greece	Did not finish					
—	88	Anastasia Mantsiou	Greece	Did not finish					
—	89	Sadaf Saveh-Shemshaki	Iran	Did not finish					
—	91	Silouani Kostits	Greece	Did not finish					
—	92	Andriani Pieri	Cyprus	Did not finish					
—	95	Fiona Rusta	Kosovo	Did not finish					
—	22	Meta Hrovat	Slovenia	Disqualified					
—	73	Elise Pellegrin	Malta	Disqualified					
—	93	Carlie Iskandar	Lebanon	Disqualified					
