= Maren Wiesler =

German alpine skier (born 1993)

Personal information
- Born: 7 February 1993 (age 33)

Skiing career
- Sport: Alpine skiing ♀

Maren Wiesler (born 7 February 1993) is a German alpine ski racer.

She competed at the 2015 World Championships in Beaver Creek, USA, where she placed 12th in the slalom.

== World Championship results ==
Year	Slalom	Giant slalom	Super-G	Downhill	Combined
2017	—	33	—	—	—
