= Charlotte Chable =

Swiss alpine ski racer

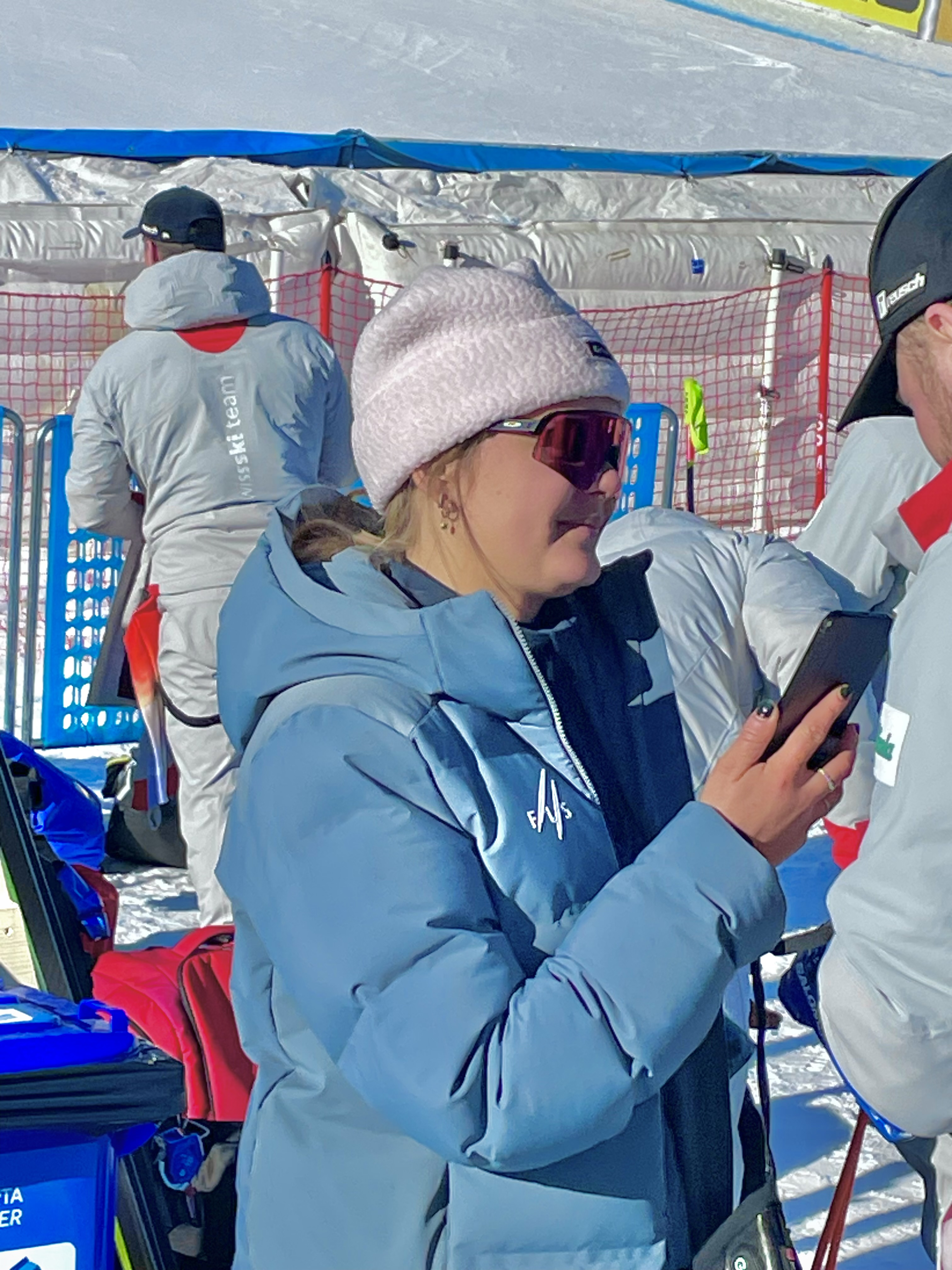
- Charlotte Chable in Livigno, 2025

Personal information
- Born: 31 October 1994 (age 31)

Skiing career
- Sport: Alpine skiing ♀
- Club: Villars sur Ollon
- Retired: 18 November 2021
- Disciplines: Slalom
- World Cup debut: 13 January 2015

World Championships
- Medals: 0 (15th in SL, 2015)

World Cup
- Overall titles: 0 (76th in 2016)
- Discipline titles: 0 (28th in SL, 2016)

Charlotte Chable (born 31 October 1994) is a Swiss former alpine ski racer. She competed at the 2015 World Championships in Beaver Creek, USA, where she placed 15th in the slalom.

== World Cup results ==
Season	Age	Overall	Slalom	Giant slalom	Super-G	Downhill	Combined
2015	19	87	36	—	—	—	—
2016	20	76	28	—	—	—	—

== World Championship results ==
Year	Age	Slalom	Giant slalom	Super-G	Downhill	Combined
2015	20	15	—	—	—	—
