= Nastasia Noens =

French alpine skier

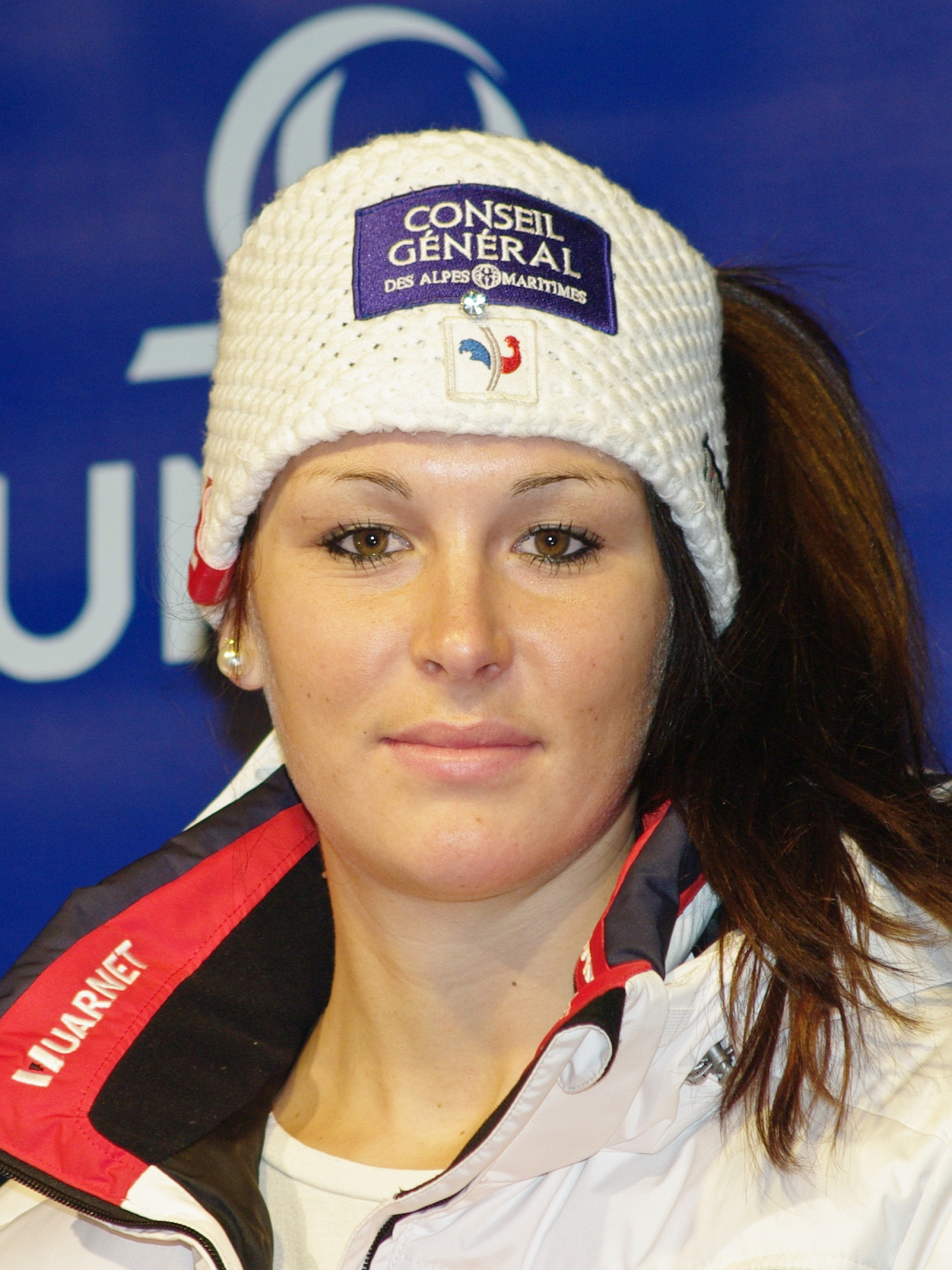
- Noens in December 2010

Personal information
- Born: 12 September 1988 (age 37) Nice, Alpes-Maritimes, France
- Height: 1.77 m (5 ft 10 in)

Skiing career
- Sport: Alpine skiing
- Club: Douanes – Interclub Nice
- Disciplines: Slalom
- World Cup debut: 11 November 2006 (age 18)

Olympics
- Teams: 4 – (2010–2022)
- Medals: 0

World Championships
- Teams: 8 – (2009–2023)
- Medals: 1 (1 gold)

World Cup
- Seasons: 16 – (2007–2019, 2021-2023)
- Wins: 0
- Podiums: 3 – (3 SL)
- Overall titles: 0 – (24th in 2011)
- Discipline titles: 0 – (7th in SL, 2016)
Medal record
Women's alpine skiing
Representing France
World Championships
Gold medal – first place	2017 St. Moritz	Team event
Junior World Ski Championships
Bronze medal – third place	2008 Formigal	Slalom

Nastasia Noens (born 12 September 1988) is a French World Cup alpine ski racer. She competes in the technical events and specializes in slalom. She made her World Cup debut in November 2006 and her first podium in January 2011.

From Nice, Alpes-Maritimes, Noens represented France at three Winter Olympics and was seventh in the slalom in 2014. She has competed at seven World Championships, and was ninth in slalom in 2011 and 2015.

== World Cup results ==
=== Season standings ===
Season	Age	Overall	Slalom	Giant slalom	Super-G	Downhill	Combined
2007	18	122	54	—	—	—	—
2008	19						
2009	20	101	42	—	—	—	—
2010	21	64	19	—	—	—	—
2011	22	24	8	—	—	—	—
2012	23	34	11	—	—	—	—
2013	24	70	29	—	—	—	—
2014	25	42	14	—	—	—	—
2015	26	39	13	—	—	—	—
2016	27	26	7	—	—	—	—
2017	28	120	52	35	—	—	—
2018	29	74	27	35	—	—	—
2019	30	53	17	35	—	—	—
2020	31						
2021	32	59	23	—	—	—	—N/a
2022	33	62	23	—	—	—	—N/a
2023	34	63	27	—	—	—	—N/a

=== Race podiums ===
- 3 podiums – (3 SL); 30 top tens

Season	Date	Location	Discipline	Place
2011	11 Jan 2011	Flachau, Austria	Slalom	3rd
2014	5 Jan 2014	Bormio, Italy	Slalom	3rd
2016	15 Feb 2016	Crans-Montana, Switzerland	Slalom	2nd

== World Championship results ==
Year	Age	Slalom	Giant slalom	Super-G	Downhill	Combined
2009	20	13	—	—	—	—
2011	22	9	—	—	—	—
2013	24	20	—	—	—	—
2015	26	9	—	—	—	—
2017	28	12	—	—	—	—
2019	30	13	—	—	—	—
2021	32	11	—	—	—	—
2023	34	15	—	—	—	—

== Olympic results ==
Year	Age	Slalom	Giant slalom	Super-G	Downhill	Combined	Team event
2010	21	29	—	—	—	—	—N/a
2014	25	7	—	—	—	—	—N/a
2018	29	20	—	—	—	—	—
2022	33	19	—	—	—	—	4

== Video/photo ==
- YouTube.com – video – Nastasia Noens – Flachau – 1st run – 2011-01-11
- YouTube.com – video – Nastasia Noens
- Zimbio.com – photos – Nastasia Noens
