= Šejla =

- Gender: Female

Other names
- Variant form: Sejla
- See also: Sheila

Šejla is a female first name, mostly used in Bosnia and Herzegovina.

== Notable people ==
- Šejla Kamerić (born 1976), Bosnian visual artist
- Šejla Merdanović (born 1997), Bosnian alpine ski racer
- Šejla Selimović (born 1995), Bosnian footballer
