= Petra Vlhová =

Slovak alpine skier (born 1995)

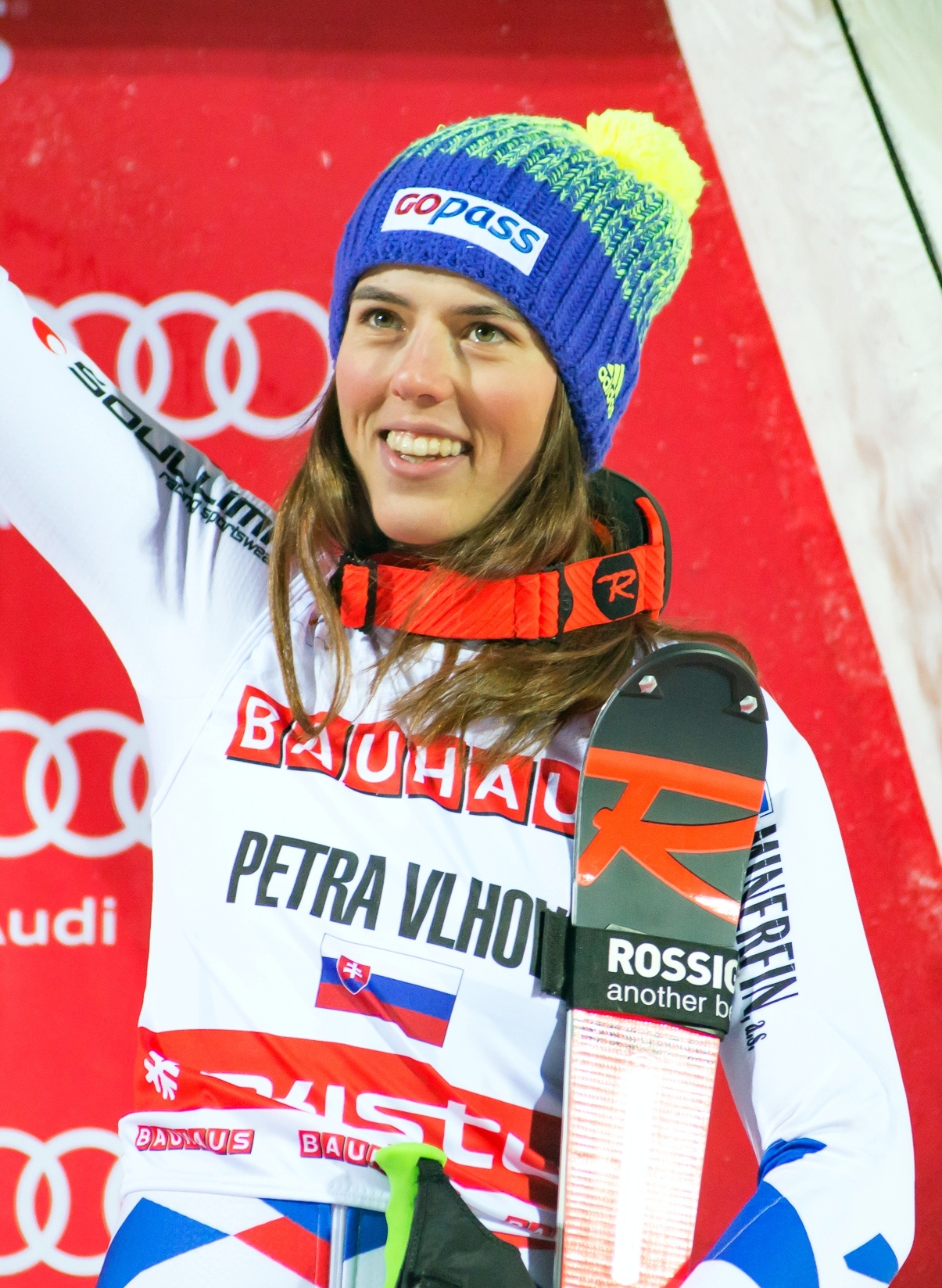
- Vlhová in January 2018

Personal information
- Born: 13 June 1995 (age 31) Liptovský Mikuláš, Slovakia
- Height: 1.80 m (5 ft 11 in)
- Website: petravlhova.sk

Skiing career
- Sport: Alpine skiing
- Club: Vojenské športové centrum Dukla Banská Bystrica
- Disciplines: Slalom, giant slalom, super-G, downhill, combined
- World Cup debut: 29 December 2012 (age 17)

Olympics
- Teams: 4 – (2014–2026)
- Medals: 1 (1 gold)

World Championships
- Teams: 6 – (2013–2023)
- Medals: 6 (1 gold)

World Cup
- Seasons: 12 – (2013–2024)
- Wins: 31 – (22 SL, 6 GS, 1 PSL, 1 CE, 1 PGS)
- Podiums: 73 – (46 SL, 19 GS, 3 PSL, 2 CE, 1 PGS, 1 AC, 1 SG)
- Overall titles: 1 – (2021)
- Discipline titles: 3 – (SL – 2020, 2022, PS – 2020)
Medal record
Women's alpine skiing
Representing Slovakia
World Cup race podiums
Event	1st	2nd	3rd
Slalom	22	15	9
Giant slalom	6	5	8
Super-G	0	1	0
Combined	0	0	1
Parallel	3	2	1
Total	31	23	19
International competitions
Event	1st	2nd	3rd
Olympic Games	1	0	0
World Championships	1	4	1
Total	2	4	1
Olympic Games
Gold medal – first place	2022 Beijing	Slalom
World Championships
Gold medal – first place	2019 Åre	Giant slalom
Silver medal – second place	2017 St. Moritz	Team event
Silver medal – second place	2019 Åre	Combined
Silver medal – second place	2021 Cortina d'Ampezzo	Combined
Silver medal – second place	2021 Cortina d'Ampezzo	Slalom
Bronze medal – third place	2019 Åre	Slalom
Winter Youth Olympic Games
Gold medal – first place	2012 Innsbruck	Slalom
Junior World Championships
Gold medal – first place	2014 Jasná	Slalom
Bronze medal – third place	2012 Roccaraso	Slalom

Petra Vlhová (born 13 June 1995) is a Slovak World Cup alpine ski racer who specialises in the technical events of slalom and giant slalom. Vlhová won the World Cup overall title in 2021 and the gold medal in the 2022 Winter Olympics in the slalom event, becoming the first Slovak skier to achieve these feats.

== Career ==
Born in Liptovský Mikuláš, during childhood she attended training sessions at Podbreziny ski center in her native Liptovský Mikuláš. With an altitude of 700 meters and tracks with a combined length of 550 meters, the ski center entered disusage in the later 2000s and early 2010s. In 2022, Vlhová supported the restart of the center and the local youth training groups.

Vlhová won a gold medal in 2012 Winter Youth Olympics and represented Slovakia in the 2014 Winter Olympics. She also won gold in the slalom at the Junior World Championships in 2014 in Jasná, Slovakia.

== World Cup ==
She made her World Cup debut at age 17 in December 2012, and her first World Cup podium came three years later, a victory in slalom in December 2015 at Åre, Sweden. On 17 January 2016, she qualified for the second run in giant slalom for the first time in her career in Flachau finishing 14th.

=== 2019 season ===
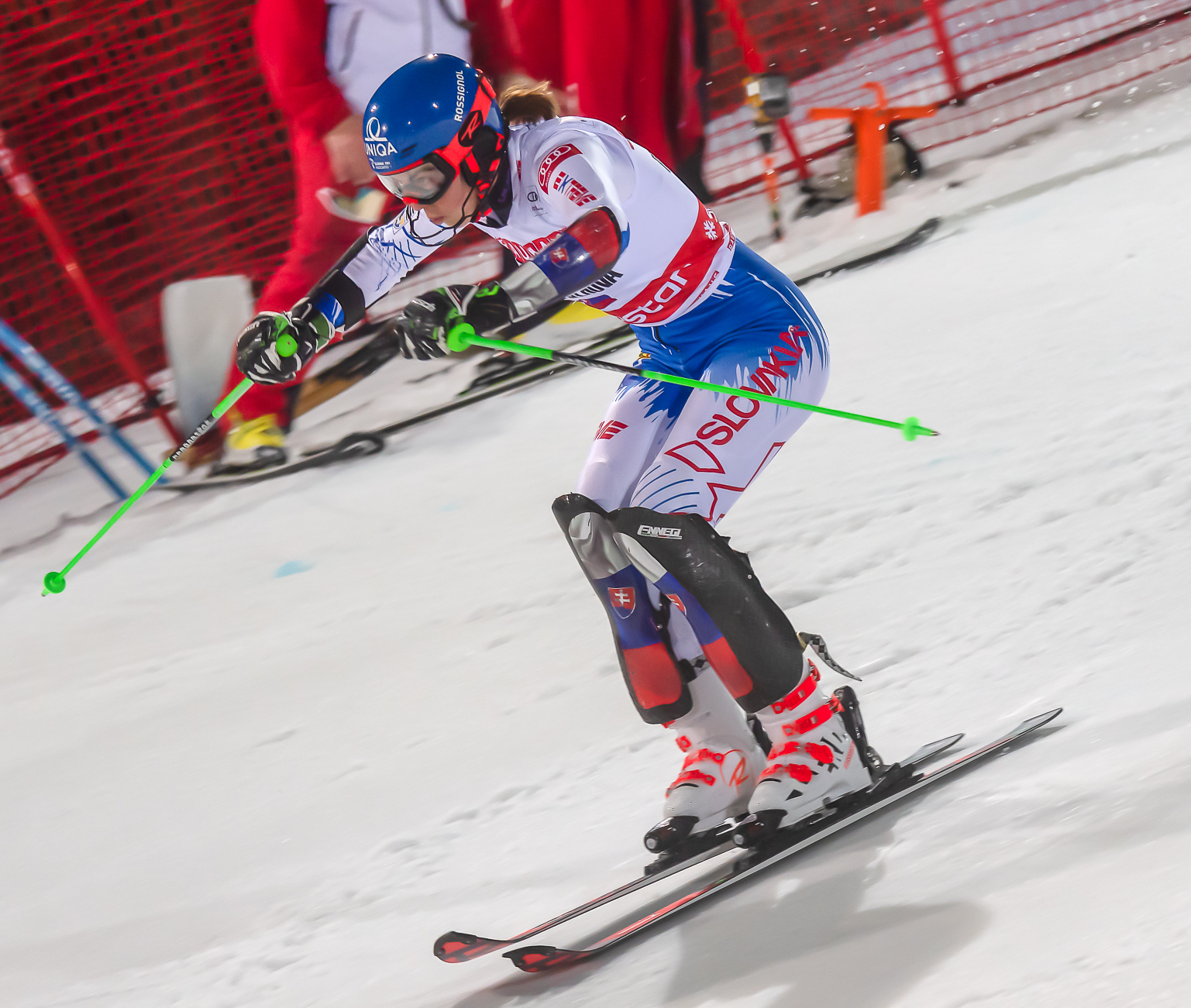
Vlhová in Stockholm, 2019

In December 2018, Vlhová scored the first World Cup giant slalom win for Slovakia in a race in Semmering, Austria – she was in fourth place after the first run but set the second fastest time on the second run for the victory: her previous best GS result had been seventh. A few days later she won a parallel slalom at the foot of the Holmenkollbakken in Oslo, the sixth win of her career, setting a new record for the most World Cup wins by a Slovak alpine skier, eclipsing Veronika Velez-Zuzulová.

In January 2019, having finished as runner-up to Mikaela Shiffrin in the first five classic slaloms of the World Cup season, Vlhová won the slalom in Flachau, setting the fastest time on the second run to take the win after placing third in the first run and taking the winner's €70,000 prize, the biggest women's prize purse of the World Cup season. The race was her fifth win in classic slalom, putting her one ahead of Velez-Zuzulová in terms of wins in the discipline.

At the Alpine World Ski Championships in February 2019, Vlhová took a complete set of medals. She claimed the first individual medal for a Slovak skier – a silver in the combined – after being edged out by Wendy Holdener by three-hundredths of a second. She then won the first gold medal for Slovakia in the giant slalom, before taking the bronze in the slalom.

=== 2020 season ===
Vlhová started the 2020 season with a 14th-place finish in giant slalom at Sölden. She reached her first podium in the season on Killington when she finished second in Slalom. On 15 December 2019, she won a Parallel slalom race in St. Moritz. In the last race of 2019, she finished second again in Lienz behind Mikaela Shiffrin. She started the new year with three victories in 4 races. First, she won the slalom in Zagreb on 4 January; 10 days later, she triumphed in the Flachau slalom, and then she took her only Giant slalom win of the season on 18 January, when she shared the spoils with Federica Brignone in Sestriere.

Vlhová started competing in the speed events in her bid to win the big crystal globe in the later part of the season. She claimed two 6th places in Bansko, one in the downhill and one in the super-G. She claimed two other top 10 results in Garmisch-Partenkirchen. Her final win of the season came in slalom in Kranjska Gora on 16 February. She recorded a new personal best downhill with a 4th place in Crans Montana on 21 February. In the season's final race, she finished 4th in a super-G in La Thuile, which was her best result in the discipline up to that point.

The season was cut short by the COVID-19 pandemic. Vlhová finished 3rd in the overall world cup standings, winning her first small crystal globes, one for slalom and one for parallel events.

=== 2021 season ===
Vlhová had a strong start to the season with 3rd place in the opening giant slalom in Sölden. She followed that up with three victories in a row, having won two slaloms in two days in Levi and a parallel giant slalom in Lech/Zürs. In December, Vlhová finished 3rd in the first of two giant slaloms in Courchevel (France) but did not finish the other one two days later. In Val d'Isère, she finished 26th and 33rd in the two downhills before getting 6th place in the super-G a day later. Vlhová recorded three more victories in the season - slalom in Zagreb, giant slalom on her home track in Jasná, and slalom in Åre. She also recorded her first podium in a speed event when she finished 2nd in the super-G in Garmisch-Partenkirchen on February 1.

She also won two silver medals at the World Championships in Cortina d'Ampezzo, one in the alpine combined and one in slalom.

Vlhová secured her first overall title at the world cup finals in Lenzerheide, finishing 6th in slalom. She became the first Slovak skier to achieve this title.

=== 2022 season ===
Vlhová parted ways with her Italian coach Livio Magoni shortly after the end of the 2021 season after a 5-year partnership. She hired swiss coach Mauro Pini as replacement.

Vlhová had a strong start to the season with 3rd place in the opening giant slalom in Sölden. She followed that up with two victories in a row, having won two slaloms in two days in Levi. She won three more slaloms in Lienz, Zagreb and Kranjska Gora and clinched the slalom crystal globe with a second place finish in Schladming, with two slaloms remaining.

She became the first Slovak alpine skier to win an Olympic medal by winning gold in slalom in Beijing. She was in 8th place after the first round, 0.72 seconds behind Lena Dürr, but then produced the fastest run on the second leg to win gold by 0.08 seconds ahead of reigning world champion Katharina Liensberger.

After the Olympics, Vlhová mounted a challenge to defend her overall world cup title. She won the giant slalom in Åre to record her sixth win of the season. She finally lost the chance to win the big crystal globe after the final super-G race in Courchevel/Méribel, where Mikaela Shiffrin finished in 2nd position and clinched the title. Vlhová finished off the season with two podiums in slalom and giant slalom.

=== 2023 season ===
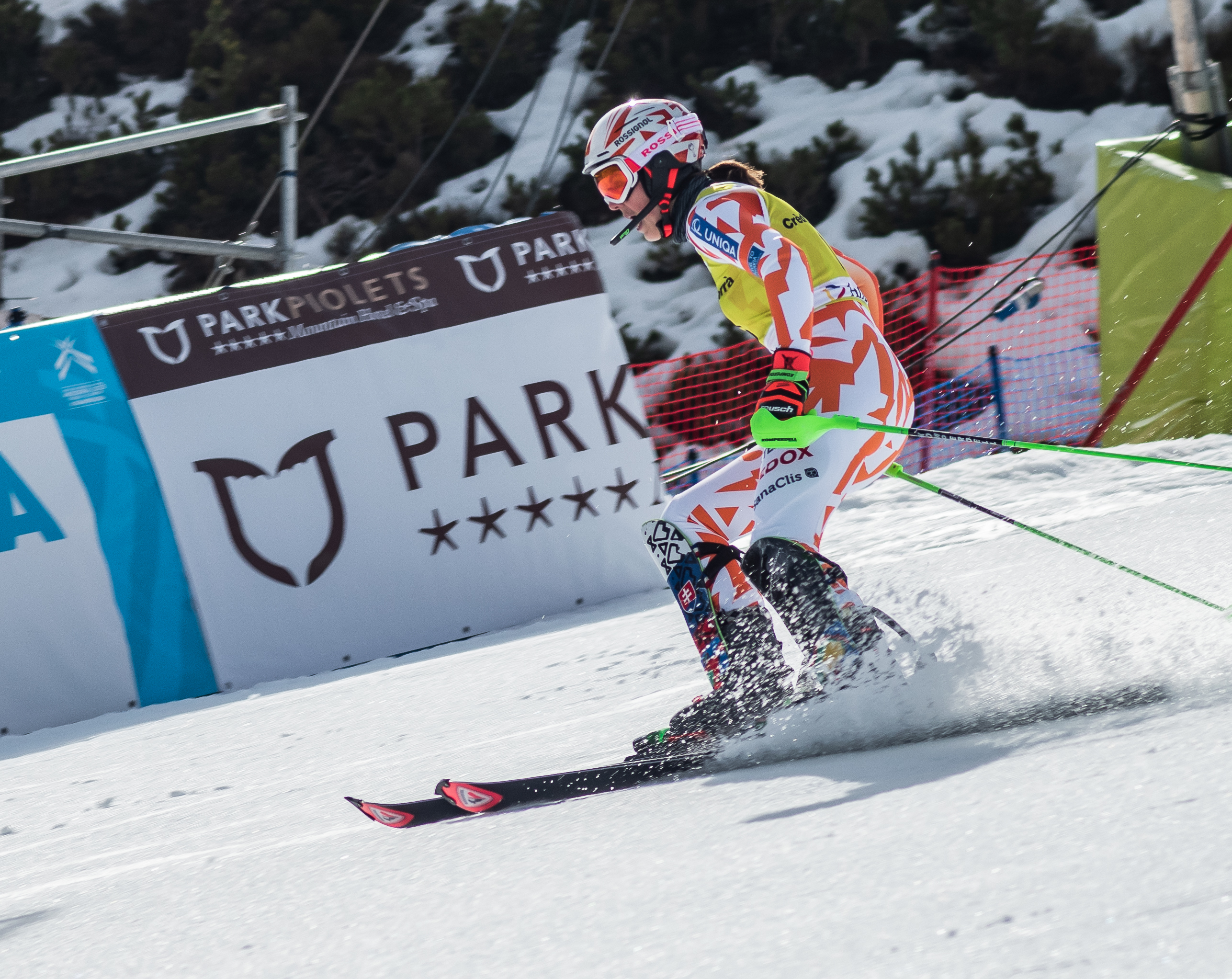
Vlhová slalom skiing in Soldeu

Vlhová finished the season in third place overall.

=== 2024 season ===
Vlhová had a strong start to the season with 3rd place in the opening giant slalom in Sölden. She reached her first win of the season in slalom in Levi. It was her 20th career slalom victory.

== World Cup results ==
=== Season titles ===
- 4 titles – (1 overall, 2 Slalom, 1 Parallel)

Season	
Season	Discipline
2020	Slalom
2020	Parallel
2021	Overall
2021	Parallel ^{[1]}
2022	Slalom

^{1} Unofficial

=== Season standings ===
Season
Season	Age	Overall	Slalom	Giant slalom	Super-G	Downhill	Combined	Parallel
2013	17	91	42	—	—	—	—	—N/a
2014	18	—	—	—	—	—	—	—N/a
2015	19	81	34	—	—	—	—	—N/a
2016	20	24	6	40	—	—	—	—N/a
2017	21	10	5	11	—	—	—	—N/a
2018	22	5	4	13	—	—	7	—N/a
2019	23	2	2	2	—	—	—	—N/a
2020	24	3	1	2	14	16	—	1
2021	25	1	3	6	8	12	—N/a	1
2022	26	2	1	4	40	37	—N/a	—
2023	27	3	3	4	—	41	—N/a	—N/a
2024 ^	28	6	3	8	—	—	—N/a	—N/a
2025	29	injured: did not compete					—N/a	—N/a
2026	30	injured: did not compete					—N/a	—N/a

^ Injured in mid-January, out for the rest of the season

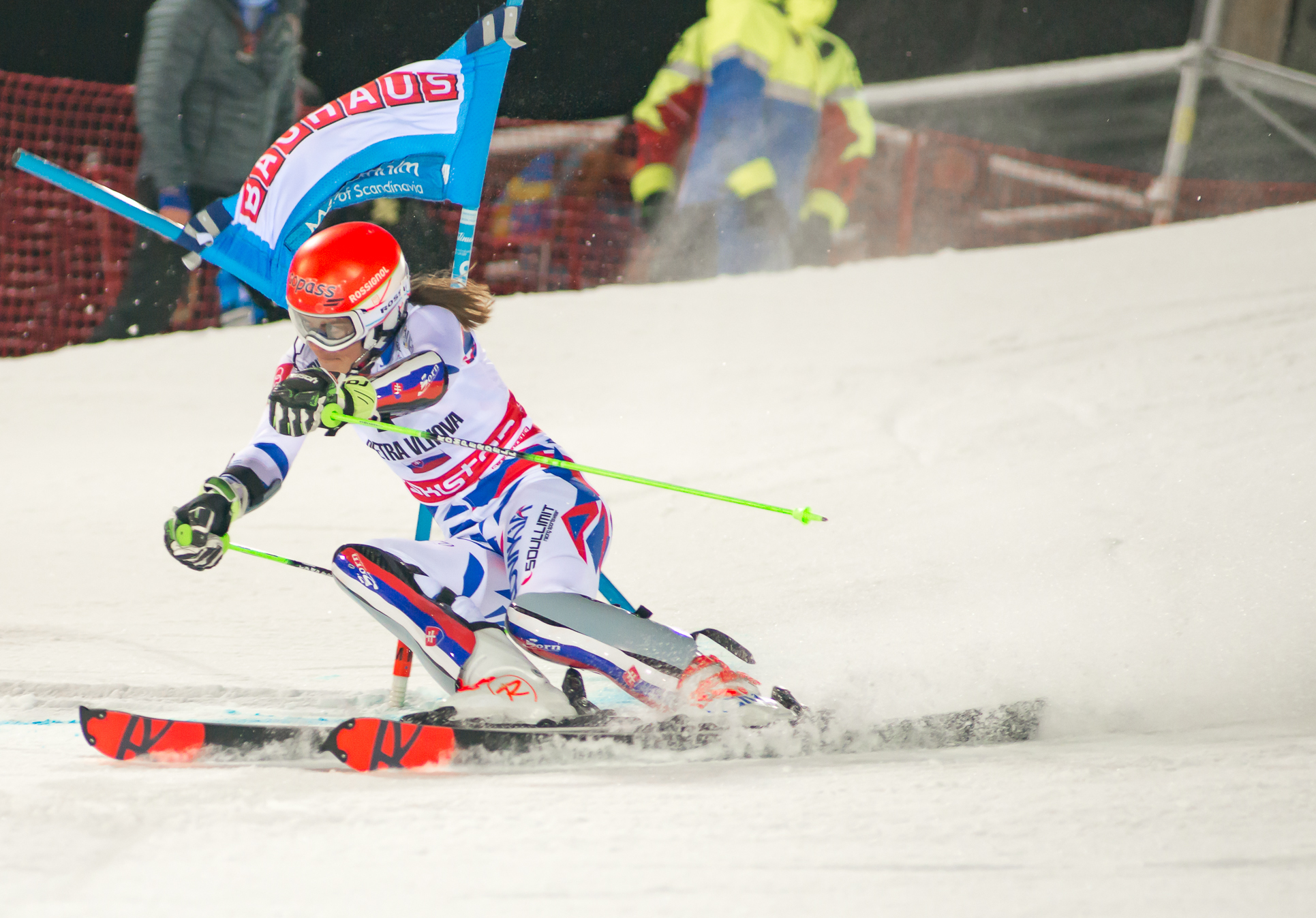
Vlhová in Hammarbybacken World Cup 2018

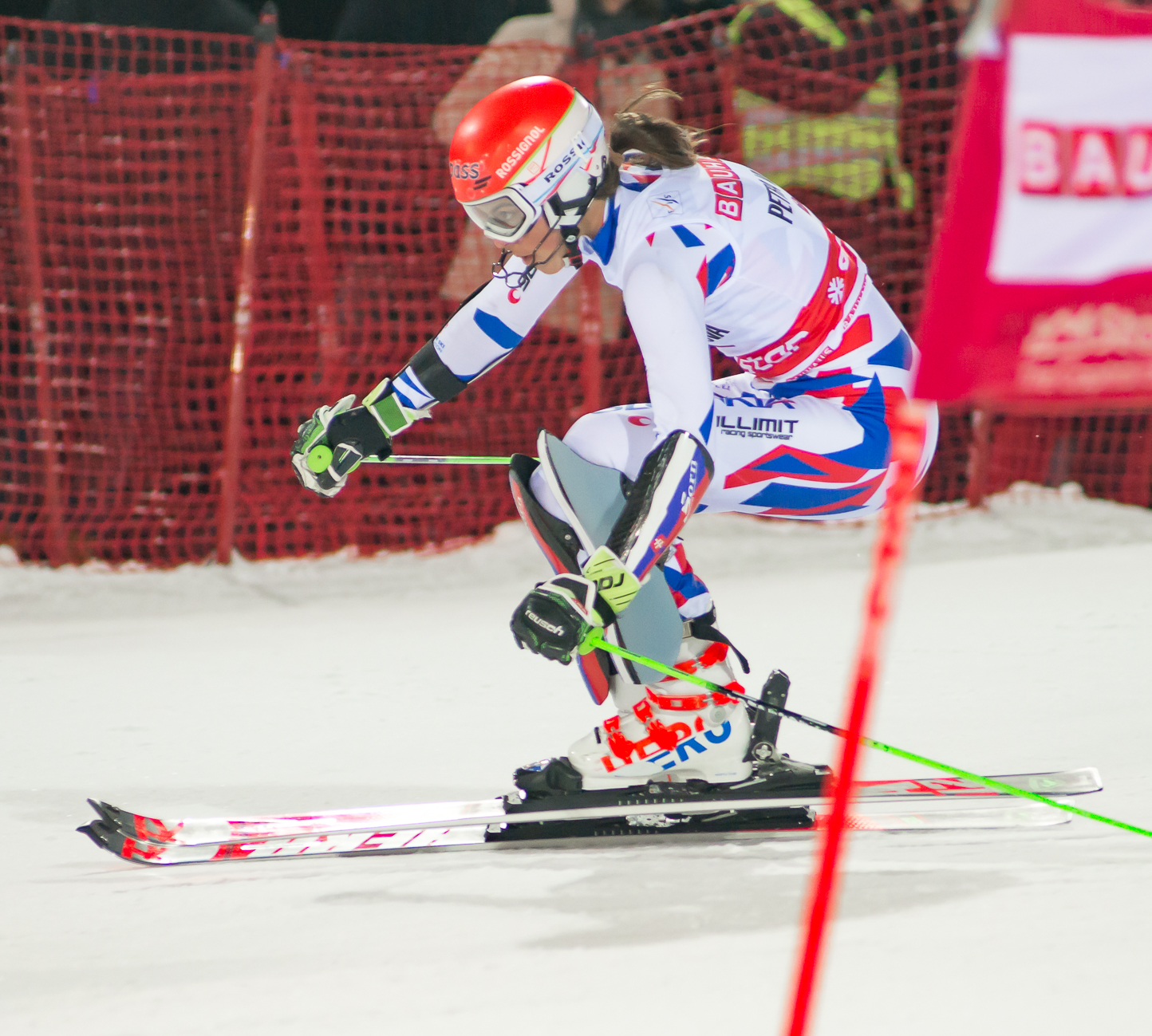
Vlhová in Hammarbybacken World Cup 2018

=== Race victories ===
	Total	Slalom	Giant slalom	Downhill	Super-G	Combined	Parallel
Wins	31	22	6	0	0	0	3
Podiums	73	46	19	0	1	1	6

Season
Season	Date	Location	Discipline
2016	13 December 2015	Åre, Sweden	Slalom
2017	18 March 2017	(United States) Aspen, USA	Slalom
2018	11 November 2017	Levi, Finland	Slalom
2018	28 January 2018	Lenzerheide, Switzerland	Slalom
2019; 5 victories (3 GS, 1 SL, 1 CE)	28 December 2018	Semmering, Austria	Giant slalom
2019; 5 victories (3 GS, 1 SL, 1 CE)	1 January 2019	Oslo, Norway	City event
2019; 5 victories (3 GS, 1 SL, 1 CE)	8 January 2019	Flachau, Austria	Slalom
2019; 5 victories (3 GS, 1 SL, 1 CE)	1 February 2019	Maribor, Slovenia	Giant slalom
2019; 5 victories (3 GS, 1 SL, 1 CE)	8 March 2019	(Czech Republic) Špindlerův Mlýn, Czech Republic	Giant slalom
2020; 5 victories (3 SL, 1 GS, 1 PS)	15 December 2019	St. Moritz, Switzerland	Parallel slalom
2020; 5 victories (3 SL, 1 GS, 1 PS)	4 January 2020	Zagreb, Croatia	Slalom
2020; 5 victories (3 SL, 1 GS, 1 PS)	14 January 2020	Flachau, Austria	Slalom
2020; 5 victories (3 SL, 1 GS, 1 PS)	18 January 2020	Sestriere, Italy	Giant slalom
2020; 5 victories (3 SL, 1 GS, 1 PS)	16 February 2020	Kranjska Gora, Slovenia	Slalom
2021; 6 victories (4 SL, 1 GS, 1 PG)	21 November 2020	Levi, Finland	Slalom
2021; 6 victories (4 SL, 1 GS, 1 PG)	22 November 2020	Levi, Finland	Slalom
2021; 6 victories (4 SL, 1 GS, 1 PG)	26 November 2020	Lech/Zürs, Austria	Parallel-G
2021; 6 victories (4 SL, 1 GS, 1 PG)	3 January 2021	Zagreb, Croatia	Slalom
2021; 6 victories (4 SL, 1 GS, 1 PG)	7 March 2021	Jasná, Slovakia	Giant slalom
2021; 6 victories (4 SL, 1 GS, 1 PG)	12 March 2021	Åre, Sweden	Slalom
2022; 6 victories (5 SL, 1 GS)	20 November 2021	Levi, Finland	Slalom
2022; 6 victories (5 SL, 1 GS)	21 November 2021	Levi, Finland	Slalom
2022; 6 victories (5 SL, 1 GS)	29 December 2021	Lienz, Austria	Slalom
2022; 6 victories (5 SL, 1 GS)	4 January 2022	Zagreb, Croatia	Slalom
2022; 6 victories (5 SL, 1 GS)	9 January 2022	Kranjska Gora, Slovenia	Slalom
2022; 6 victories (5 SL, 1 GS)	11 March 2022	Åre, Sweden	Giant slalom
2023; 2 victories (2 SL)	10 January 2023	Flachau, Austria	Slalom
2023; 2 victories (2 SL)	18 March 2023	Soldeu, Andorra	Slalom
2024; 3 victories (3 SL)	11 November 2023	Levi, Finland	Slalom
2024; 3 victories (3 SL)	21 December 2023	Courchevel, France	Slalom
2024; 3 victories (3 SL)	7 January 2024	Kranjska Gora, Slovenia	Slalom

=== Podiums ===
Season	Podiums																		
Season	Super G			Giant slalom			Slalom			Parallel^{[1]}			Combined			Total			
Season	1st place, gold medalist(s)	2nd place, silver medalist(s)	3rd place, bronze medalist(s)	1st place, gold medalist(s)	2nd place, silver medalist(s)	3rd place, bronze medalist(s)	1st place, gold medalist(s)	2nd place, silver medalist(s)	3rd place, bronze medalist(s)	1st place, gold medalist(s)	2nd place, silver medalist(s)	3rd place, bronze medalist(s)	1st place, gold medalist(s)	2nd place, silver medalist(s)	3rd place, bronze medalist(s)	1st place, gold medalist(s)	2nd place, silver medalist(s)	3rd place, bronze medalist(s)	Σ
2016							1		2							1		2	3
2017							1	1	1							1	1	1	3
2018							2	1			1	1			1	2	2	2	6
2019				3		1	1	5	2	1	1					5	6	3	14
2020				1	1		3	2		1						5	3		8
2021		1		1		2	4	1		1						6	2	2	10
2022				1	2	2	5	2	1							6	4	3	13
2023					1	2	2	1	3							2	2	5	9
2024					1	1	3	2								3	3	1	7
Total	0	1	0	6	5	8	22	15	9	3	2	1	0	0	1	31	23	19	73
Total	1			19			46			6			1			73			73

^{1} Including both parallel slalom and parallel giant slalom. Two parallel events have been classified in the ski-db.com results as classic events (the City Event slalom on 30/01/18 and the City Event slalom on 01/01/19). They are shown here as parallel events.

== World Championship results ==
Year
Year	Age	Slalom	Giant slalom	Super-G	Downhill	Combined	Team combined	Parallel	Team event
2013	17	DNF1	—	—	—	—	—N/a	—N/a	9
2015	19	44	30	—	—	—	—N/a	—N/a	—
2017	21	4	8	—	—	—	—N/a	—N/a	2
2019	23	3	1	—	—	2	—N/a	—N/a	—
2021	25	2	12	9	—	2	—N/a	DNF	—
2023	27	5	7	—	—	—	—N/a	—	—
2025	29	injured: did not compete							

== Olympic results ==
Year
Year	Age	Slalom	Giant slalom	Super-G	Downhill	Combined	Team combined	Team event
2014	18	19	24	—	—	—	—N/a	—N/a
2018	22	13	13	32	DNF	5	—N/a	9
2022	26	1	14	—	—	—	—N/a	—
2026	30	20	—	—	—	—N/a	DNF2	—N/a

== Recognition ==
In 2019, Vlhová won a Crystal Wing Awards.

In 2024, the president of Slovakia Zuzana Čaputová awarded Vlhová the Order of Ľudovít Štúr, 1st class.

== See also ==
- List of FIS Alpine Ski World Cup women's race winners
- List of Youth Olympic Games gold medalists who won Olympic gold medals

Awards and achievements
Preceded by Anastasiya Kuzmina	Sportsperson of Slovakia; 2019, 2020, 2021	Succeeded by Incumbent
