= Frida Hansdotter =

Swedish alpine skier

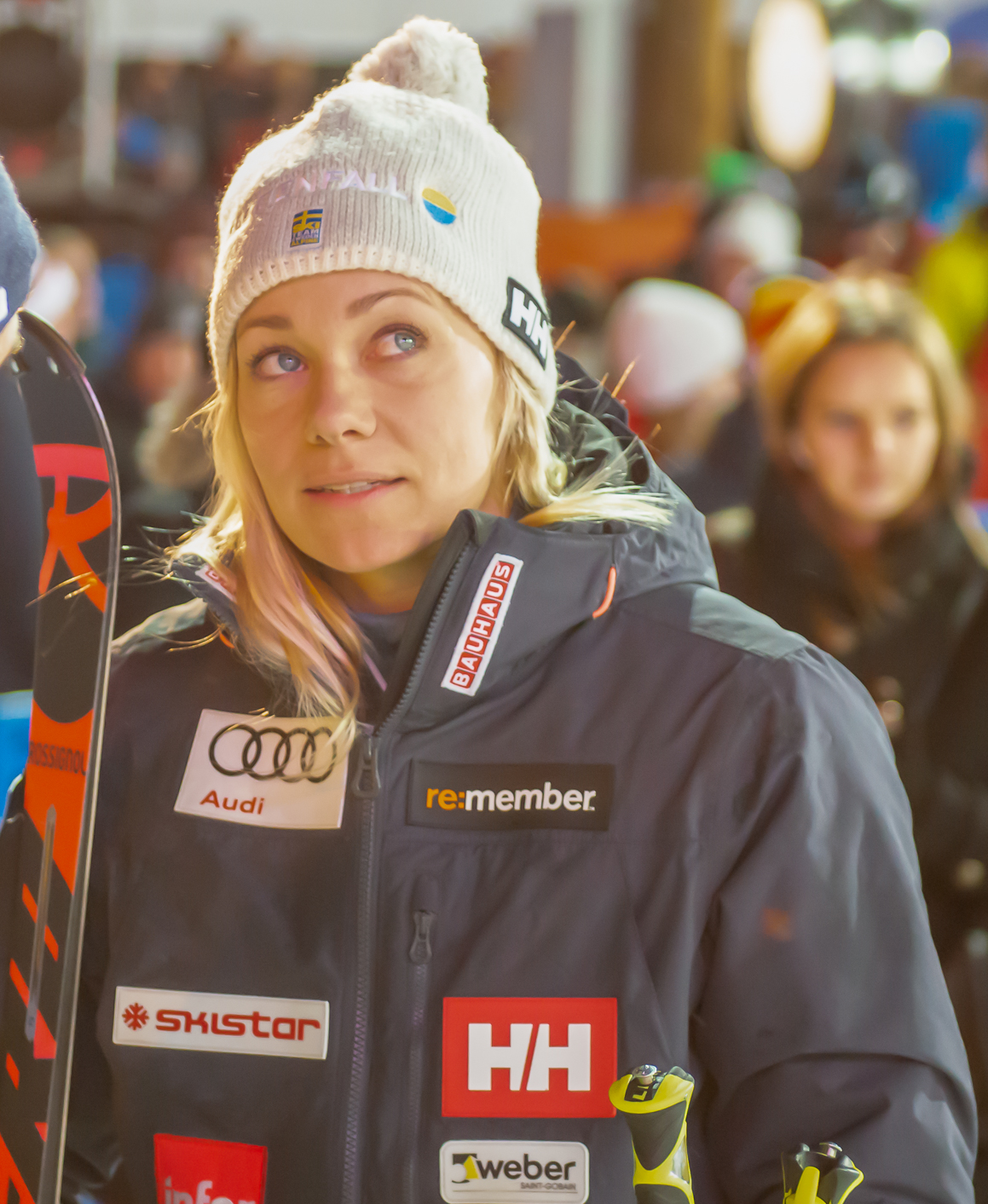
- Frida Hansdotter 2019

Personal information
- Born: 13 December 1985 (age 40) Västerås, Sweden
- Height: 1.73 m (5 ft 8 in)
- Website: fridahansdotter.com

Skiing career
- Sport: Alpine skiing
- Club: Norbergs SLK
- Retired: 17 March 2019 (age 33)
- Disciplines: Slalom, giant slalom
- World Cup debut: 23 October 2004 (age 18)

Olympics
- Teams: 3 – (2010, 2014, 2018)
- Medals: 1 (1 gold)

World Championships
- Teams: 7 – (2007–2019)
- Medals: 3 (0 gold)

World Cup
- Seasons: 15 – (2005–2019)
- Wins: 4 – (4 SL)
- Podiums: 35 – (34 SL, 1 PSL)
- Overall titles: 0 – (5th in 2016)
- Discipline titles: 1 – (SL, 2016)
Medal record
Women's alpine skiing
Representing Sweden
International alpine ski competitions
Event	1st	2nd	3rd
Olympic Games	1	0	0
World Championships	0	2	3
Total	1	2	3
Olympic Games
Gold medal – first place	2018 Pyeongchang	Slalom
World Championships
Silver medal – second place	2013 Schladming	Team event
Silver medal – second place	2015 Beaver Creek	Slalom
Bronze medal – third place	2013 Schladming	Slalom
Bronze medal – third place	2017 St. Moritz	Slalom
Bronze medal – third place	2017 St. Moritz	Team event

Frida Marie Hansdotter (born 13 December 1985) is a Swedish former World Cup alpine ski racer and Olympic champion. She competed in the technical events and specialised in slalom. Hansdotter's father Hans Johansson was also an alpine racer, and she is a second cousin of Prince Daniel.

On 6 March 2019, she announced her retirement from alpine skiing following the 2018–2019 season. In February 2022 she was elected to serve eight-year terms as a member of both the International Olympic Committee and the IOC Athletes' Commission.

== Career ==
Born in Västerås, Hansdotter represented Sweden at three Winter Olympics, and at seven World Championships. She gained her first World Cup victory at Kranjska Gora in 2014, which followed eight runner-up finishes, the most in World Cup history without a win. She was runner-up in the slalom season standings in 2014 and 2015, and won the title in 2016.

Hansdotter has won three medals in the slalom at the World Championships: silver in 2015 and bronze in 2013 and 2017.

At the 2018 Winter Olympics, she won the women's slalom.

== World Cup results ==
=== Season titles ===
- 1 title – (1 slalom)

Season
Season	Discipline
2016	Slalom

=== Season standings ===
Season
Season	Age	Overall	Slalom	Giant; Slalom	Super G	Downhill	Combined
2007	21	89	30	—	—	—	—
2008	22	53	19	45	—	—	—
2009	23	28	9	44	—	—	27
2010	24	62	18	—	—	—	—
2011	25	46	14	—	—	—	—
2012	26	25	9	45	—	—	—
2013	27	10	4	12	—	—	—
2014	28	10	2nd place, silver medalist(s)	26	—	—	—
2015	29	6	2nd place, silver medalist(s)	14	—	—	—
2016	30	5	1st place, gold medalist(s)	8	—	—	—
2017	31	13	4	32	—	—	—
2018	32	9	3rd place, bronze medalist(s)	17	—	—	—
2019	33	8	5	11	—	—	—

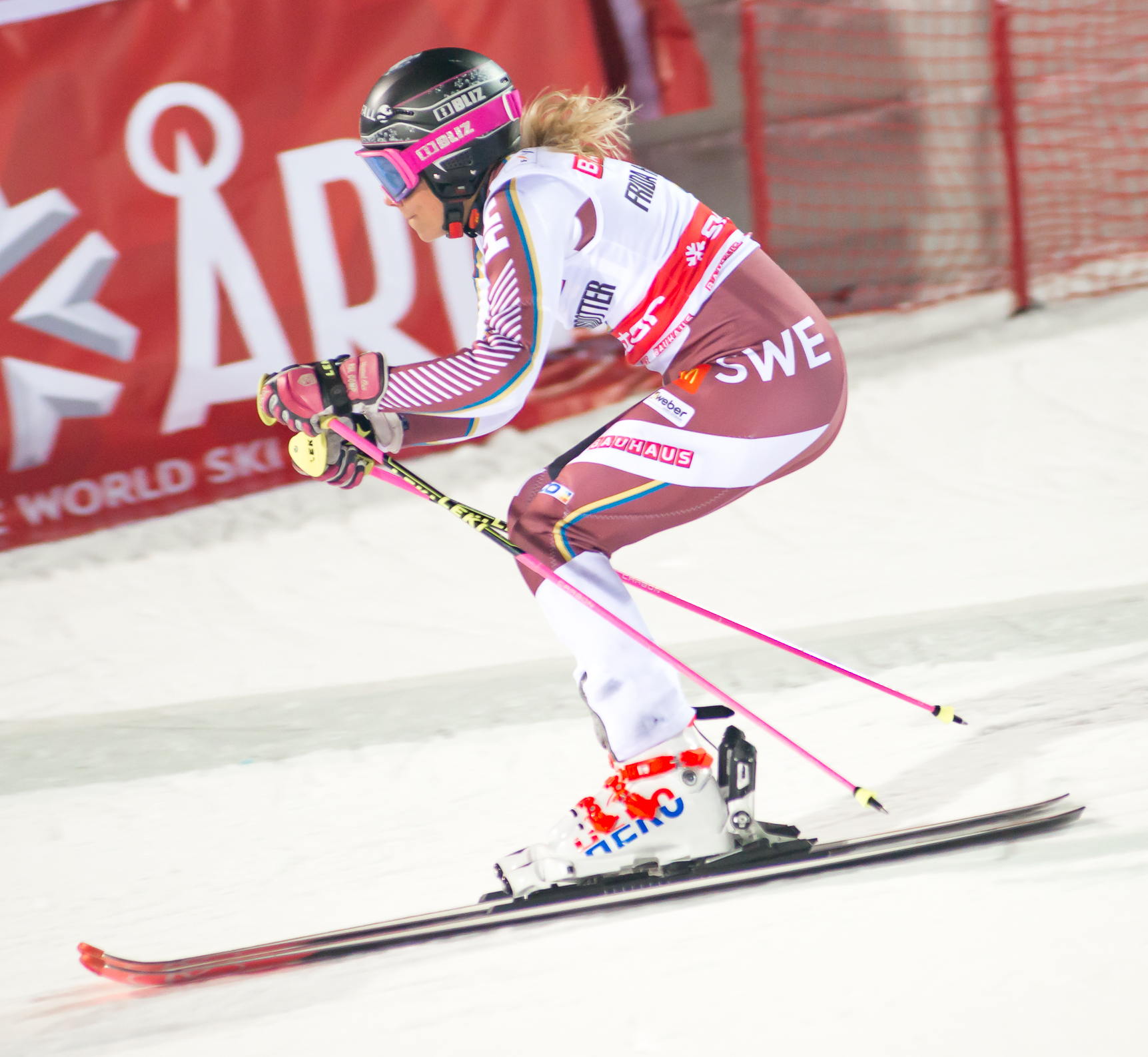
Hansdotter, January 2018

=== Race podiums ===
- 4 wins – (4 SL)
- 35 podiums – (34 SL, 1 PSL)

Season
Season	Date	Location	Discipline	Place
2009	7 March 2009	Ofterschwang, Germany	Slalom	2nd
2012	11 February 2012	Soldeu, Andorra	Slalom	2nd
2013	20 December 2012	Åre, Sweden	Slalom	2nd
2013	4 January 2013	Zagreb, Croatia	Slalom	2nd
2013	15 January 2013	Flachau, Austria	Slalom	2nd
2013	27 January 2013	Maribor, Slovenia	Slalom	2nd
2014	17 December 2013	Courchevel, France	Slalom	2nd
2014	14 January 2014	Flachau, Austria	Slalom	2nd
2014	2 February 2014	Kranjska Gora, Slovenia	Slalom	1st
2014	15 March 2014	Lenzerheide, Switzerland	Slalom	2nd
2015	15 November 2014	Levi, Finland	Slalom	2nd
2015	30 November 2014	(United States) Aspen, USA	Slalom	2nd
2015	13 December 2014	Åre, Sweden	Slalom	3rd
2015	13 January 2015	Flachau, Austria	Slalom	1st
2015	21 March 2015	Méribel, France	Slalom	2nd
2016	28 November 2015	(United States) Aspen, USA	Slalom	3rd
2016	29 November 2015	(United States) Aspen, USA	Slalom	2nd
2016	13 December 2015	Åre, Sweden	Slalom	2nd
2016	29 December 2015	Lienz, Austria	Slalom	1st
2016	12 January 2016	Flachau, Austria	Slalom	3rd
2016	15 January 2016	Flachau, Austria	Slalom	2nd
2016	23 February 2016	Stockholm, Sweden	Parallel slalom	2nd
2016	19 March 2016	St. Moritz, Switzerland	Slalom	3rd
2017	8 January 2017	Maribor, Slovenia	Slalom	3rd
2017	10 January 2017	Flachau, Austria	Slalom	1st
2017	18 March 2017	(United States) Aspen, USA	Slalom	3rd
2018	28 December 2017	Lienz, Austria	Slalom	3rd
2018	3 January 2018	Zagreb, Croatia	Slalom	3rd
2018	7 January 2018	Kranjska Gora, Slovenia	Slalom	2nd
2018	9 January 2018	Flachau, Austria	Slalom	3rd
2018	28 January 2018	Lenzerheide, Switzerland	Slalom	2nd
2018	10 March 2018	Ofterschwang, Germany	Slalom	3rd
2018	17 March 2018	Åre, Sweden	Slalom	3rd
2019	25 November 2018	(United States) Killington, USA	Slalom	3rd
2019	22 December 2018	Courchevel, France	Slalom	3rd

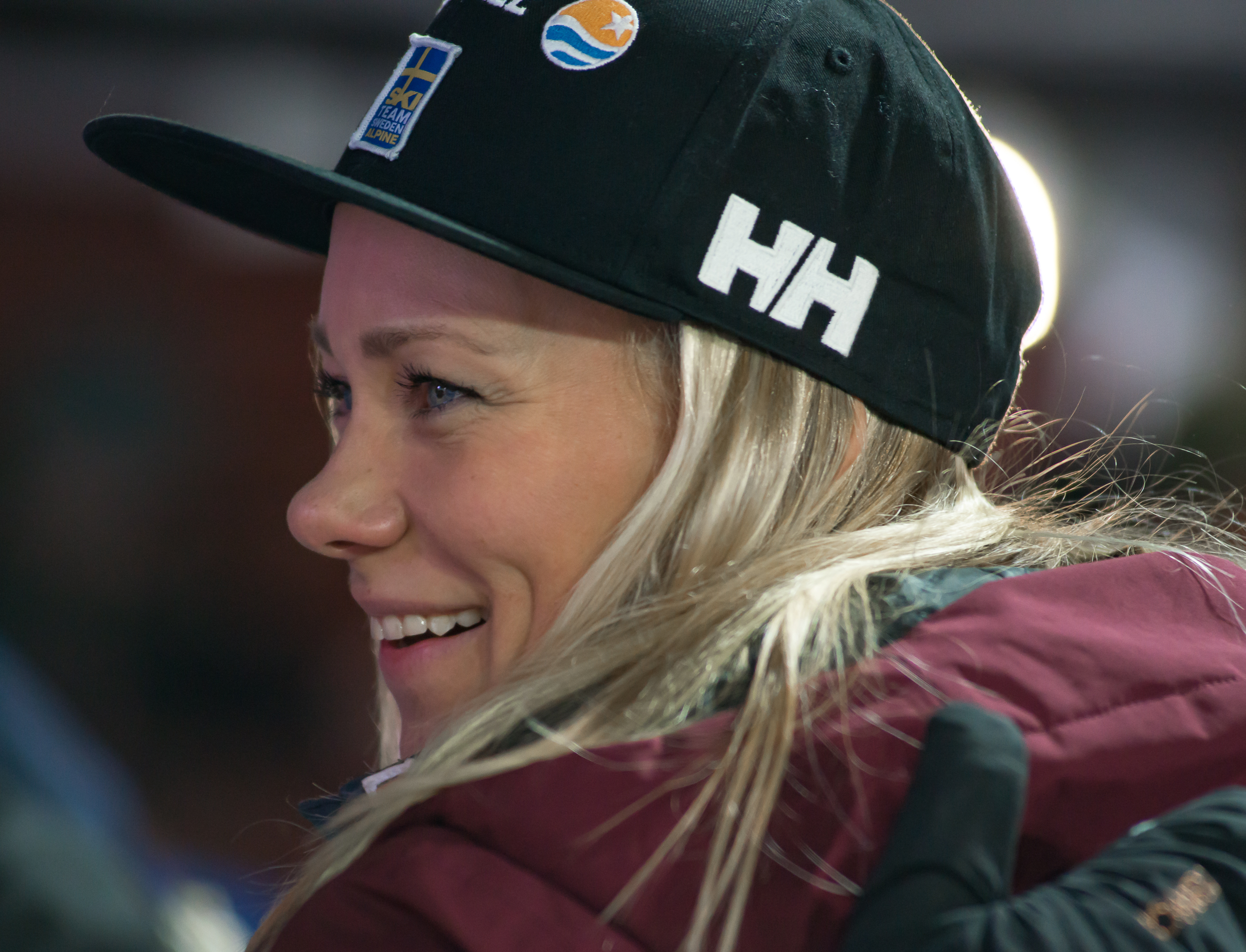
Frida Hansdotter in Hammarbybacken, January 2018

== World Championship results ==
Year
Year	Age	Slalom	Giant; Slalom	Super G	Downhill	Combined
2007	21	—	—	30	—	—
2009	23	15	DNF1	DNF	—	DNF1
2011	25	8	—	—	—	—
2013	27	3	5	—	—	—
2015	29	2	12	—	—	—
2017	31	3	16	—	—	—
2019	33	5	11	—	—	—

== Olympic results ==
Year
Year	Age	Slalom	Giant; Slalom	Super G	Downhill	Combined
2010	24	15	—	—	—	—
2014	28	5	13	—	—	—
2018	32	1	6	—	—	—
