= María Guðmundsdóttir (skier) =

Icelandic alpine skier (1993–2022)

Personal information
- Born: 29 June 1993
- Died: 2 September 2022 (aged 29)

Skiing career
- Sport: Alpine skiing ♀
- Club: Skíðafélag Akureyrar

María Guðmundsdóttir Toney (29 June 1993 – 2 September 2022) was an Icelandic alpine ski racer. She won the Icelandic slalom championship four times and the giant slalom championship twice.

She competed at the 2013 World Championships in Schladming, Austria, and the 2015 World Championships in Beaver Creek, USA, in the slalom. She retired from competing in 2018 due to repeated injuries.

== Illness and death ==
In December 2021, María was diagnosed with a rare type of cancer in the spleen, Primary Splenic Angiosarcoma. She died from the illness on 2 September 2022.

== Personal life ==
María was born to Guðmundur Sigurjónsson and Bryndís Ýr Viggósdóttir, both known competitive skiers in Iceland. She was married to Ryan Toney.
