= Wendy Holdener =

Swiss alpine skier (born 1993)

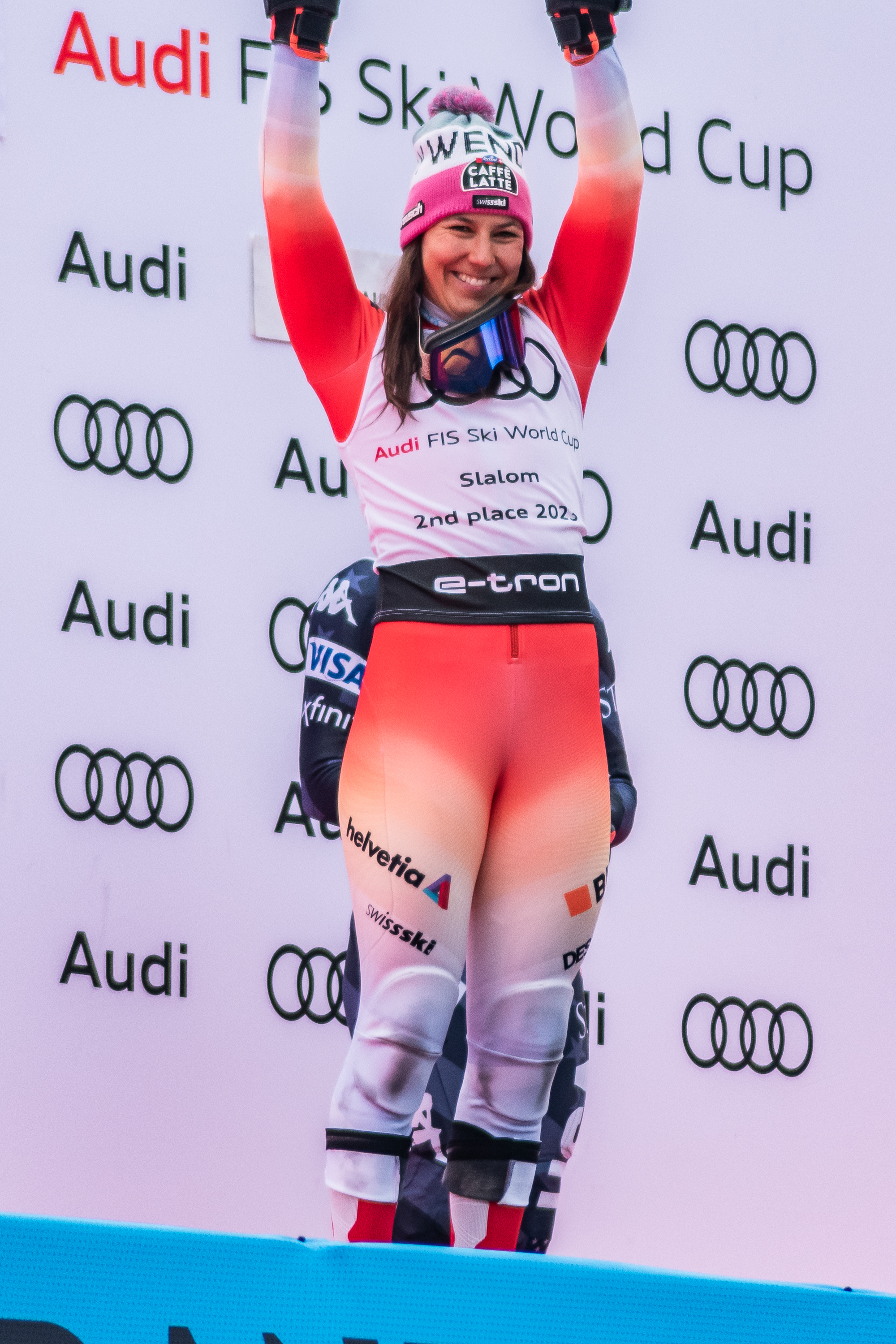
- At Soldeu in March 2023

Personal information
- Born: 12 May 1993 (age 33) Unteriberg, Schwyz, Switzerland
- Height: 1.67 m (5 ft 6 in)
- Website: wendyholdener.ch

Skiing career
- Country: Switzerland
- Sport: Alpine skiing
- Club: SC Drusberg
- Disciplines: Slalom, combined, giant slalom, super-G
- World Cup debut: 23 October 2010 (age 17)

Olympics
- Teams: 4 – (2014, 2018, 2022, 2026)
- Medals: 5 (1 gold)

World Championships
- Teams: 7 – (2011–2025)
- Medals: 9 (3 gold)

World Cup
- Seasons: 16 – (2011–2026)
- Wins: 7 – (2 SL, 3 PSL, 2 AC)
- Podiums: 55 – (41 SL, 5 PSL, 5 AC, 2 SG, 2 GS)
- Overall titles: 0 – (2nd in 2018)
- Discipline titles: 2 – (AC, 2016 and 2018)
Medal record
Women's alpine skiing
Representing Switzerland
World Cup race podiums
Event	1st	2nd	3rd
Slalom	2	20	18
Giant slalom	0	0	2
Super-G	0	0	2
Combined	2	2	1
Parallel	1	2	2
Total	5	24	25
International alpine ski competitions
Event	1st	2nd	3rd
Olympic Games	1	2	2
World Championships	3	6	0
Total	4	8	2
Olympic Games
Gold medal – first place	2018 Pyeongchang	Team event
Silver medal – second place	2018 Pyeongchang	Slalom
Silver medal – second place	2022 Beijing	Combined
Bronze medal – third place	2018 Pyeongchang	Combined
Bronze medal – third place	2022 Beijing	Slalom
World Championships
Gold medal – first place	2017 St. Moritz	Combined
Gold medal – first place	2019 Åre	Combined
Gold medal – first place	2019 Åre	Team event
Silver medal – second place	2017 St. Moritz	Slalom
Silver medal – second place	2023 Méribel	Combined
Silver medal – second place	2023 Méribel	Parallel
Silver medal – second place	2025 Saalbach	Slalom
Silver medal – second place	2025 Saalbach	Team event
Silver medal – second place	2025 Saalbach	Team combined
Junior World Championships
Gold medal – first place	2011 Crans Montana	Combined
Silver medal – second place	2011 Crans Montana	Downhill
Silver medal – second place	2013 Quebec	Team event
Bronze medal – third place	2011 Crans Montana	Giant slalom

Wendy Holdener (born 12 May 1993) is a Swiss World Cup alpine ski racer who specialises in slalom and combined. She is a two-time World champion in combined and a five-time Olympic medalist, four individual with one gold medal in the team event at Pyeongchang in 2018. Four years later in 2022, she won a silver medal in the combined.

== Career ==
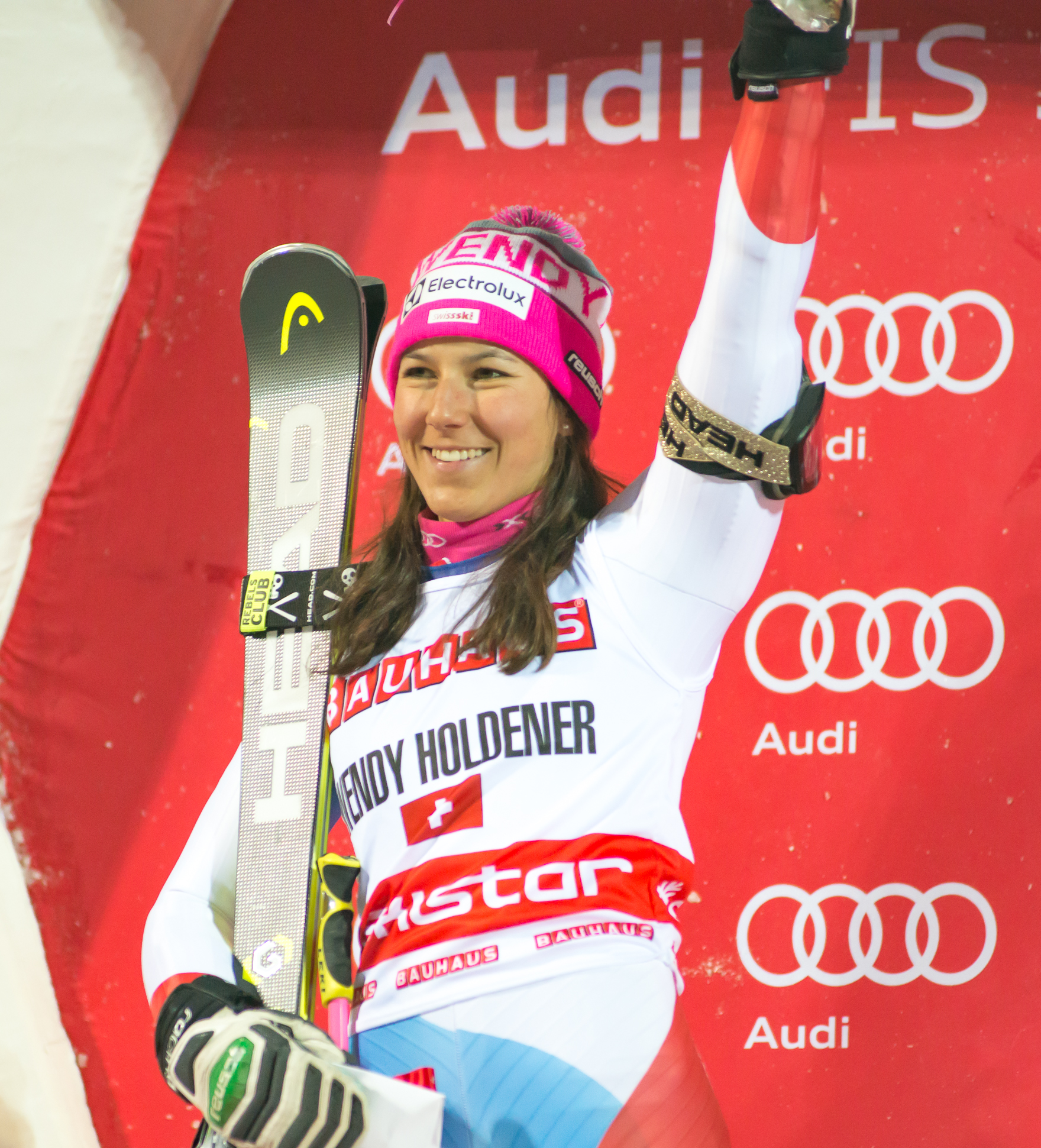
Holdener at Stockholm's Hammarbybacken in 2018

Holdener made her World Cup debut in Sölden in October 2010, and attained her first podium in March 2013, a second place in slalom at Ofterschwang. In 2016, she gained her first two World Cup victories and won the crystal globe title in the combined discipline.

Holdener's first win in a World Cup slalom came in November 2022 at Killington, shared with Anna Swenn-Larsson, after thirty previous podiums in the discipline without a victory. Another win came two weeks later at Sestriere, Italy.

Holdener finished the season in seventh place overall in the 2023 season and second in Slalom.

In the 2025 World Championships in Saalbach-Hinterglemm, she won silver medals in team event and combined. That was the inaugural race of the team combined, where Holdener skied the slalom part, and Lara Gut-Behrami the downhill part. This was Holdener's 4th medal in the combined in the last 5 championships, and 6th out of 7 if Olympics are counted.

== World Cup results ==
=== Season titles ===
- 2 titles – (2 combined)

Season	Discipline
2016	Combined
2018	Combined

=== Season standings ===
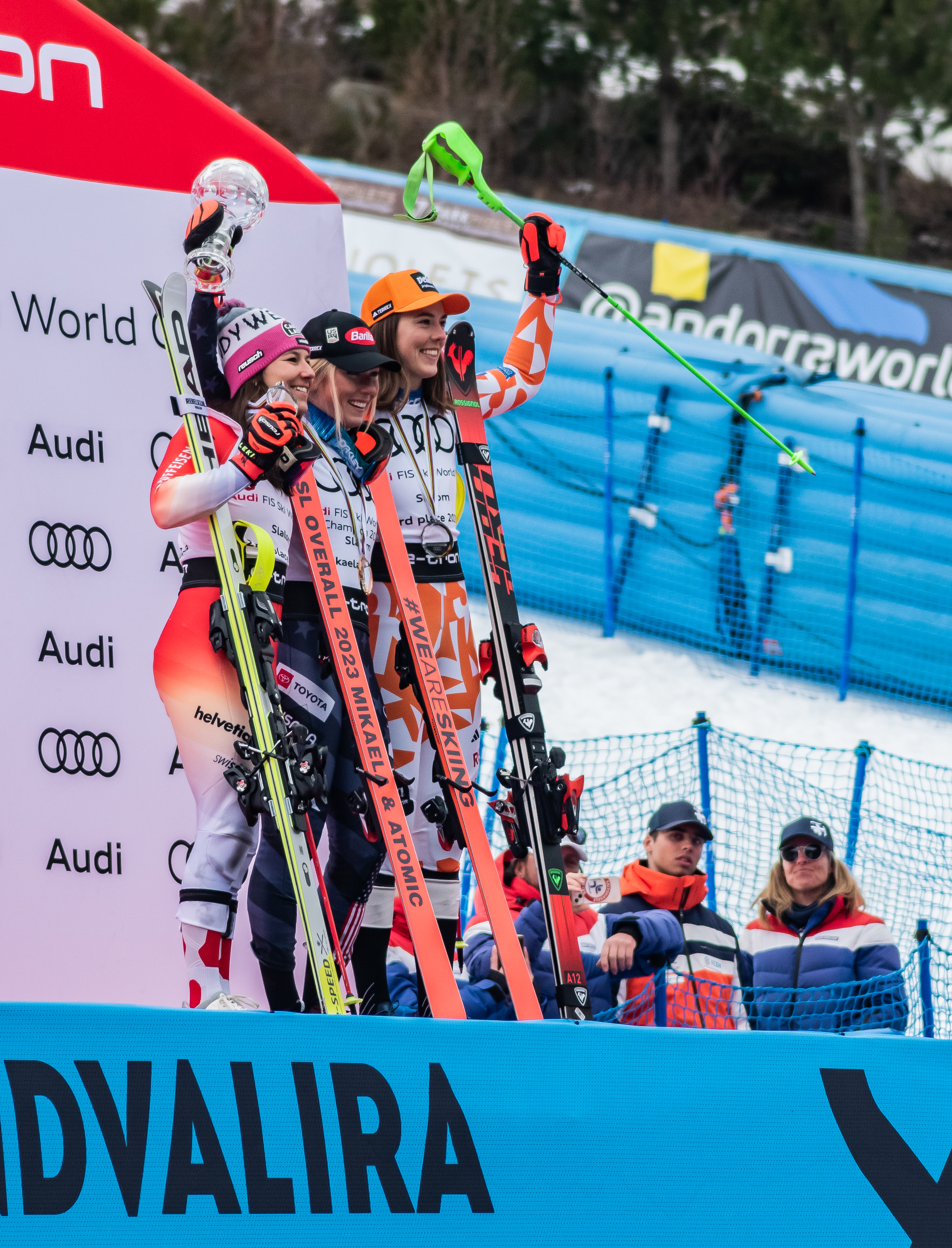
Holdener celebrates podium finish in Slalom in 2023 with Shiffrin & Vlhová.

Season
Season	Age	Overall	Slalom	Giant slalom	Super-G	Downhill	Combined	Parallel
2011	17	89	38	—	—	49	27	—N/a
2012	18	67	31	—	—	—	19	—N/a
2013	19	20	6	42	—	—	33	—N/a
2014	20	29	10	35	—	—	12	—N/a
2015	21	22	8	46	52	—	7	—N/a
2016	22	6	3rd place, bronze medalist(s)	30	45	—	1st place, gold medalist(s)	—N/a
2017	23	8	3rd place, bronze medalist(s)	22	53	—	3rd place, bronze medalist(s)	—N/a
2018	24	2nd place, silver medalist(s)	2nd place, silver medalist(s)	8	22	39	1st place, gold medalist(s)	—N/a
2019	25	3rd place, bronze medalist(s)	3rd place, bronze medalist(s)	7	22	48	3	—N/a
2020	26	6	4	6	15	38	2nd place, silver medalist(s)	13
2021	27	10	5	22	27	—	—N/a	20
2022	28	14	5	25	25	46	—N/a	—
2023	29	7	2nd place, silver medalist(s)	17	24	—	—N/a	—N/a
2024	30	57	21	41	—	—	—N/a	—N/a
2025	31	10	6	15	—	—	—N/a	—N/a
2026	32	13	3rd place, bronze medalist(s)	25	—	—	—N/a	—N/a

=== Race podiums ===
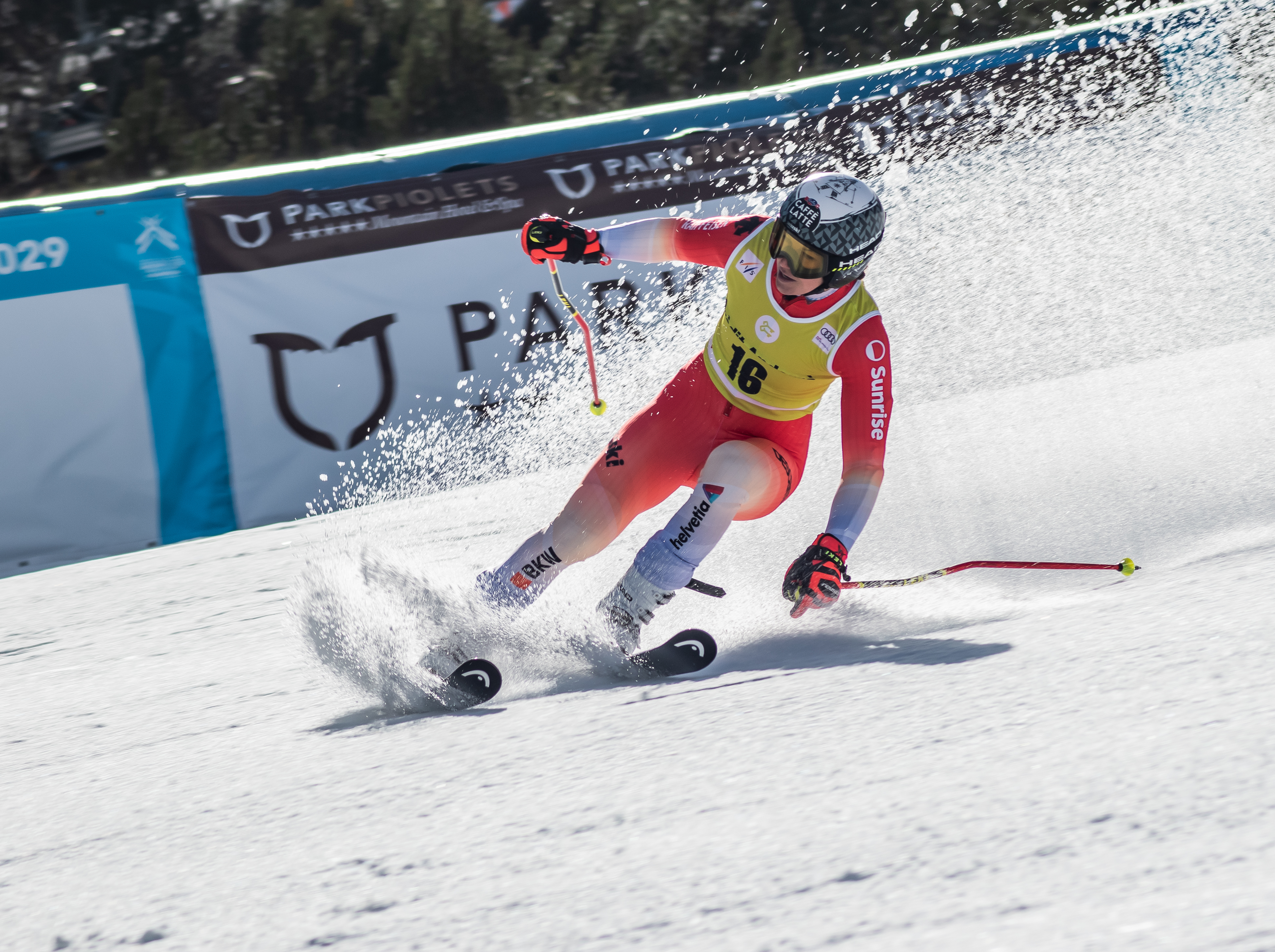
Holdener skiing in 2023.

- 5 wins – (2 SL, 1 PSL, 2 AC)
- 55 podiums – (41 SL, 5 PSL, 5 AC, 2 GS, 2 SG)

Season
Season	Date	Location	Discipline	Place
2013	10 March 2013	Ofterschwang, Germany	Slalom	2nd
2015	29 December 2014	Kühtai, Austria	Slalom	3rd
2016	29 December 2015	Lienz, Austria	Slalom	2nd
2016	23 February 2016	Stockholm, Sweden	City event	1st
2016	28 February 2016	Soldeu, Andorra	Combined	2nd
2016	6 March 2016	Jasná, Slovakia	Slalom	2nd
2016	13 March 2016	Lenzerheide, Switzerland	Combined	1st
2017	12 November 2016	Levi, Finland	Slalom	2nd
2017	27 November 2016	Killington, United States	Slalom	3rd
2017	11 December 2016	Sestriere, Italy	Slalom	3rd
2017	29 December 2016	Semmering, Austria	Slalom	3rd
2017	8 January 2017	Maribor, Slovenia	Slalom	2nd
2017	10 January 2017	Flachau, Austria	Slalom	3rd
2018	12 November 2017	Levi, Finland	Slalom	3rd
2018	28 December 2017	Lienz, Austria	Slalom	2nd
2018	1 January 2018	Oslo, Norway	City event	2nd
2018	3 January 2018	Zagreb, Croatia	Slalom	2nd
2018	7 January 2018	Kranjska Gora, Slovenia	Slalom	3rd
2018	26 January 2018	Lenzerheide, Switzerland	Combined	1st
2018	28 January 2018	Lenzerheide, Switzerland	Slalom	3rd
2018	30 January 2018	Stockholm, Sweden	City event	2nd
2018	3 March 2018	Crans-Montana, Switzerland	Super-G	3rd
2018	10 March 2018	Ofterschwang, Germany	Slalom	2nd
2018	17 March 2018	Åre, Sweden	Slalom	2nd
2019	9 December 2018	St. Moritz, Switzerland	Parallel slalom	3rd
2019	29 December 2018	Semmering, Austria	Slalom	3rd
2019	1 January 2019	Oslo, Norway	City event	3rd
2019	5 January 2019	Zagreb, Croatia	Slalom	3rd
2019	2 February 2019	Maribor, Slovenia	Slalom	3rd
2019	24 February 2019	Crans-Montana, Switzerland	Combined	3rd
2019	9 March 2019	(Czech Republic) Špindlerův Mlýn, Czech Republic	Slalom	2nd
2019	16 March 2019	Soldeu, Andorra	Slalom	2nd
2020	23 November 2019	Levi, Finland	Slalom	2nd
2020	17 December 2019	Courchevel, France	Giant slalom	3rd
2020	12 January 2020	Altenmarkt, Austria	Combined	2nd
2020	9 February 2020	Garmisch-Partenkirchen, Germany	Super-G	3rd
2020	15 February 2020	Kranjska Gora, Slovenia	Giant slalom	3rd
2020	16 February 2020	Kranjska Gora, Slovenia	Slalom	2nd
2021	12 January 2021	Flachau, Austria	Slalom	3rd
2021	6 March 2021	Jasná, Slovakia	Slalom	3rd
2021	13 March 2021	Åre, Sweden	Slalom	3rd
2022	28 November 2021	Killington, United States	Slalom	3rd
2022	9 January 2022	Kranjska Gora, Slovenia	Slalom	2nd
2023	20 November 2022	Levi, Finland	Slalom	2nd
2023	27 November 2022	Killington, United States	Slalom	1st
2023	11 December 2022	Sestriere, Italy	Slalom	1st
2023	28 January 2023	(Czech Republic) Špindlerův Mlýn, Czech Republic	Slalom	3rd
2023	11 March 2023	Åre, Sweden	Slalom	2nd
2024	26 November 2023	Killington, United States	Slalom	3rd
2025	1 December 2024	Killington, United States	Slalom	2nd
2025	5 January 2025	Kranjska Gora, Slovenia	Slalom	2nd
2025	14 January 2025	Flachau, Austria	Slalom	2nd
2026	4 January 2026	Kranjska Gora, Slovenia	Slalom	3rd
2026	15 March 2026	Åre, Sweden	Slalom	3rd
2026	24 March 2026	Hafjell, Norway	Slalom	2nd

== World Championship results ==
Year
Year	Age	Slalom	Giant slalom	Super-G	Downhill	Combined	Team combined	Parallel	Team event
2011	17	DNF2	29	—	—	—	—N/a	—N/a	5
2013	19	11	26	—	—	—	—N/a	—N/a	9
2015	21	DNF2	17	—	—	—	—N/a	—N/a	4
2017	23	2	—	—	—	1	—N/a	—N/a	4
2019	25	17	15	14	—	1	—N/a	—N/a	1
2021	27	4	8	—	—	DNF SL	—N/a	7	4
2023	29	DNF2	18	—	—	2	—N/a	2	5
2025	31	2	25	—	—	—N/a	2	—N/a	2

== Olympic results ==
Year
Year	Age	Slalom	Giant slalom	Super-G	Downhill	Combined	Team combined	Team event
2014	20	DNF1	DNF1	—	—	—	—N/a	—N/a
2018	24	2	9	—	—	3	—N/a	1
2022	28	3	9	—	—	2	—N/a	—
2026	32	4	DNS1	—	—	—N/a	6	—N/a
