= Kristiina Rove =

Finnish alpine skier (born 1990)

Personal information
- Born: 1990 (age 35–36)

Skiing career
- Sport: Alpine skiing ♀

Kristiina Rove (born 1990) is a Finnish alpine ski racer.

She competed at the 2015 World Championships in Beaver Creek, USA, in the slalom.
