= Natacha Mohbat =

Lebanese alpine skier (born 1996)

Personal information
- Born: 1996 (age 29–30) Beirut, Lebanon

Skiing career
- Sport: Alpine skiing ♀

Natacha Mohbat (born 1996) is a Lebanese alpine ski racer.

She competed at the 2015 World Championships in Beaver Creek, USA, in the slalom.
