= Laurie Mougel =

French alpine skier (born 1988)

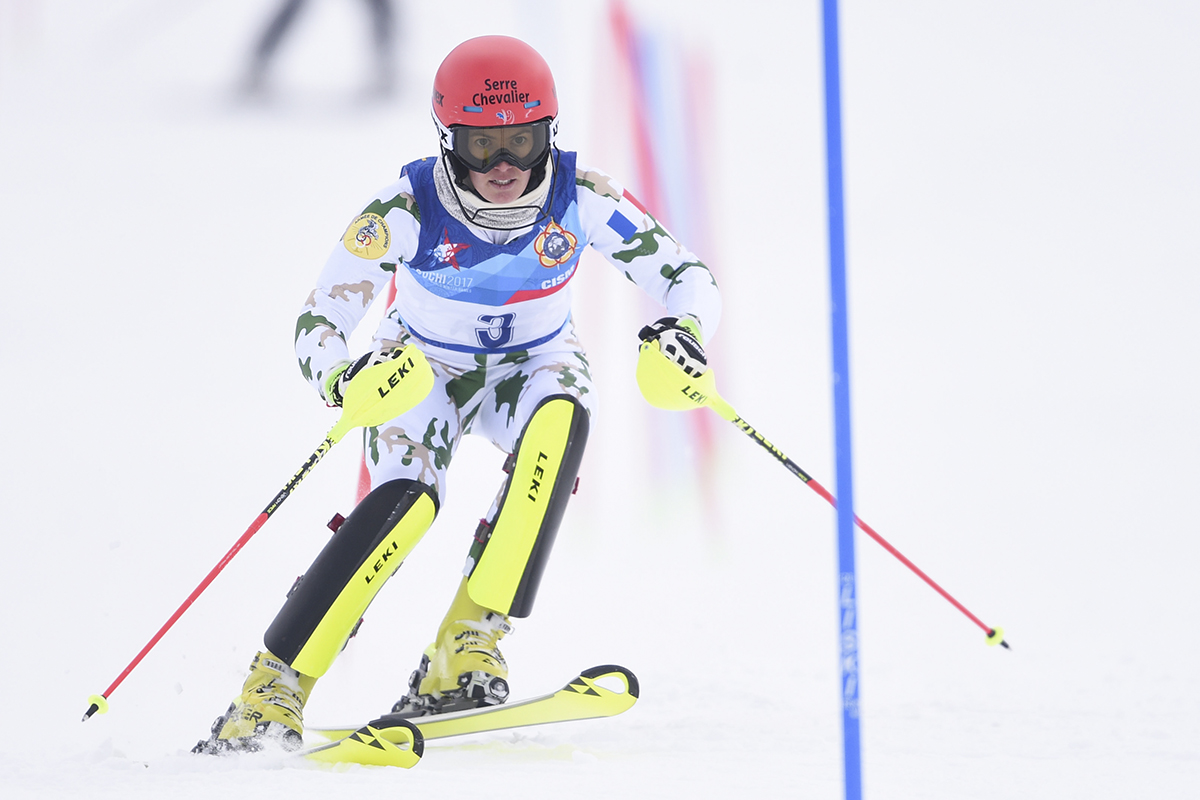

Personal information
- Born: 5 July 1988 (age 38)

Skiing career
- Sport: Alpine skiing ♀
Medal record
World Military Games
Bronze medal – third place	2017 Sochi	Slalom

Laurie Mougel (born 5 July 1988) is a French alpine ski racer.

She competed at the 2015 World Championships in Beaver Creek, USA, where she placed 17th in the slalom.
