= Mikaela Tommy =

Canadian alpine skier (born 1995)

Personal information
- Born: May 10, 1995 (age 31) Ottawa, Ontario, Canada
- Height: 165 cm (5 ft 5 in)

Skiing career
- Sport: Alpine skiing
- Club: Edelweiss
- Disciplines: Giant Slalom, Slalom

Mikaela Tommy (born May 10, 1995) is a Canadian alpine ski racer.

She competed at the 2015 World Championships in Beaver Creek, USA, in the giant slalom.
