= Lavinia Chrystal =

Australian alpine skier (born 1989)

Personal information
- Born: 5 March 1989 (age 37) Camperdown, Australia
- Height: 168 cm (5 ft 6 in) (2014)
- Weight: 64 kg (141 lb) (2014)

Skiing career
- Sport: Alpine skiing
- Disciplines: Slalom, Giant slalom
- World Cup debut: 2 February 2014

Olympics
- Teams: 1 (2014)
- Medals: 0

World Championships
- Teams: 2 (2011, 2015)
- Medals: 0

World Cup
- Seasons: 1 (2014)
- Wins: 0
- Podiums: 0

Lavinia Chrystal (born 5 March 1989 in Camperdown, Australia) is an alpine skier from Australia. She competed for Australia at the 2014 Winter Olympics in the alpine skiing events. Chrystal attended Ascham School.

== Results ==
=== Olympic Winter Games ===
As of 19 February 2026

Competition	Slalom	Giant Slalom
(Russia) 2014 Sochi	32	40

=== World Championships ===
As of 19 February 2026

Competition	Slalom	Giant Slalom
(Germany) 2011 Garmisch-Partenkirchen	51	57
(United States) 2015 Vail / Beaver Creek	45	45
