= Mathilde Nelles =

Belgian alpine skier (born 1997)

Personal information
- Born: 7 October 1997 (age 28) Malmedy
- Website: www.mathilde-nelles.com

Skiing career
- Sport: Alpine skiing ♀
- Club: BE SKI Team

Mathilde Nelles (born 7 October 1997) is a Belgian alpine ski racer.

She competed at the 2015 World Championships in Beaver Creek, USA, where she placed 47th in the slalom.
