= Ksenia Alopina =

Russian alpine skier (born 1992)

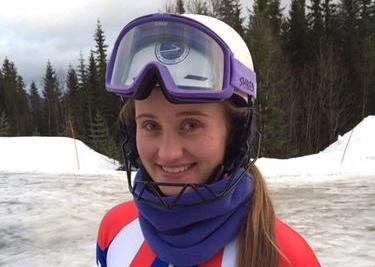

Personal information
- Born: 30 May 1992 (age 34) Beloretsk, Russia
- Height: 1.65 m (5 ft 5 in)

Skiing career
- Sport: Alpine skiing ♀

Ksenia Alekseyevna Alopina (born 30 May 1992) is a Russian alpine ski racer.

She competed at the 2015 World Championships in Beaver Creek, USA, in the slalom.
