= Tetyana Tikun =

Ukrainian alpine skier (born 1994)

Personal information
- Full name: Tetyana Tikun
- Born: 14 August 1994 (age 31) Ukraine

Sport
- Sport: Skiing
- Updated on 10 February 2013

Tetyana Tikun (born 14 August 1994) is an alpine skier from Ukraine.

== Performances ==
Level	Year	Event	SL	GS	SG	DH	SC	T
JWSC	2011	Crans Montana, Switzerland	DNF1	42	DNF1			
JWSC	2012	Roccaraso, Italy	33	66	42		13	
AWSC	2013	Schladming, Austria	65	DNF1	DNS1			
