= Katarina Lavtar =

Slovenian alpine skier (born 1988)

Katarina Lavtar (born 23 March 1988) is a World Cup alpine ski racer from Slovenia.

Lavtar made her World Cup debut March 2009 in Ofterschwang, Germany. She participated at the 2013 World Ski Championships, where she achieved a 27th place in Slalom. Lavtar will represent Slovenia at the 2014 Winter Olympics in Slalom and Giant Slalom.
