= FIS Alpine World Ski Championships 2017 =

Skiing event in St. Moritz, Switzerland

Coordinates: 46.506°N 9.787°E

- Host city: St. Moritz
- Country: Switzerland
- Nations: 76
- Athletes: 589
- Events: 11
- Opening: 6 February 2017
- Closing: 19 February 2017
- Opened by: Doris Leuthard

Location in the Alps of Europe
Location in Switzerland

The FIS Alpine World Ski Championships 2017 were the 44th FIS Alpine World Ski Championships and were held from 6 to 19 February 2017 at Piz Nair in St. Moritz, Switzerland. The host city was selected at the FIS Congress in South Korea, on 31 May 2012. The other finalists were Cortina d'Ampezzo, Italy, and Åre, Sweden.

It was the fifth Alpine World Ski Championships at St. Moritz, after 1934, 1948, 1974, and 2003.

== Schedule and course information ==
All competitions of the FIS Alpine World Ski Championships 2017 took place on the St. Moritz home mountain Corviglia.

=== Schedule ===
Time	UTC+1

Events calendar
Events			Event days													
Events			Mo	Tu	We	Th	Fr	Sa	Su	Mo	Tu	We	Th	Fr	Sa	Su
Events			6	7	8	9	10	11	12	13	14	15	16	17	18	19
Events			February													
Opening and closing ceremonies			•													•
Men
Men	Downhill							12:00	13:30							
Men	Slalom	Run 1														09:45
Men	Slalom	Run 2														13:00
Men	Giant slalom	Run 1												09:45		
Men	Giant slalom	Run 2												13:30		
Men	Alpine combined	Downhill								10:00						
Men	Alpine combined	Slalom								13:00						
Men	Super-G				12:00											
Women
Women	Downhill								11:15							
Women	Slalom	Run 1													09:45	
Women	Slalom	Run 2													13:00	
Women	Giant slalom	Run 1											09:45			
Women	Giant slalom	Run 2											13:00			
Women	Alpine combined	Downhill					10:00									
Women	Alpine combined	Slalom					13:00									
Women	Super-G			12:00												
Mixed	Team event										12:00					

- The men's downhill, originally scheduled for 11 February, was postponed one day due to adverse weather conditions.

=== Course information ===
Date	Race	Start elevation	Finish elevation	Vertical drop	Course length	Average gradient
Sun 12 Feb	Downhill – men	2,745 m (9,006 ft)	2,040 m (6,693 ft)	705 m (2,313 ft)	2.920 km (1.814 mi)	24.1%
Sun 12 Feb	Downhill – women	2,745 m (9,006 ft)	2,040 m (6,693 ft)	705 m (2,313 ft)	2.633 km (1.636 mi)	26.8%
Mon 13 Feb	Downhill – (AC) – men	2,745 m (9,006 ft)	2,040 m (6,693 ft)	705 m (2,313 ft)	2.920 km (1.814 mi)	24.1%
Fri 10 Feb	Downhill – (AC) – women	2,590 m (8,497 ft)	2,040 m (6,693 ft)	550 m (1,804 ft)	2.059 km (1.279 mi)	26.7%
Wed 8 Feb	Super-G – men	2,640 m (8,661 ft)	2,040 m (6,693 ft)	600 m (1,969 ft)	1.920 km (1.193 mi)	31.3%
Tue 7 Feb	Super-G – women	2,590 m (8,497 ft)	2,040 m (6,693 ft)	550 m (1,804 ft)	2.059 km (1.279 mi)	26.7%
Fri 17 Feb	Giant slalom – men	2,385 m (7,825 ft)	2,030 m (6,660 ft)	355 m (1,165 ft)		
Thu 16 Feb	Giant slalom – women	2,385 m (7,825 ft)	2,030 m (6,660 ft)	355 m (1,165 ft)		
Sun 19 Feb	Slalom – men	2,220 m (7,283 ft)	2,030 m (6,660 ft)	190 m (623 ft)		
Sat 18 Feb	Slalom – women	2,220 m (7,283 ft)	2,030 m (6,660 ft)	190 m (623 ft)		
Mon 13 Feb	Slalom – (AC) – men	2,220 m (7,283 ft)	2,040 m (6,693 ft)	180 m (591 ft)		
Fri 10 Feb	Slalom – (AC) – women	2,210 m (7,251 ft)	2,030 m (6,660 ft)	180 m (591 ft)		

== Medal summary ==
=== Medal table ===
Rank	Nation	Gold	Silver	Bronze	Total
1	Austria (AUT)	3	4	2	9
2	Switzerland (SUI)*	3	2	2	7
3	France (FRA)	2	0	0	2
4	Canada (CAN)	1	1	1	3
4	United States (USA)	1	1	1	3
6	Slovenia (SLO)	1	0	0	1
7	Norway (NOR)	0	1	1	2
8	Liechtenstein (LIE)	0	1	0	1
8	Slovakia (SVK)	0	1	0	1
10	Sweden (SWE)	0	0	2	2
11	Germany (GER)	0	0	1	1
11	Italy (ITA)	0	0	1	1
Totals (12 entries)		11	11	11	33

- Host country highlighted.

=== Men's events ===
Event	Gold		Silver		Bronze	
Downhill	Beat Feuz; Switzerland	1:38.91	Erik Guay; Canada	1:39.03	Max Franz; Austria	1:39.28
Super-G	Erik Guay; Canada	1:25.38	Kjetil Jansrud; Norway	1:25.83	Manuel Osborne-Paradis; Canada	1:25.89
Giant slalom	Marcel Hirscher; Austria	2:13.31	Roland Leitinger; Austria	2:13.56	Leif Kristian Haugen; Norway	2:14.02
Slalom	Marcel Hirscher; Austria	1:34.75	Manuel Feller; Austria	1:35.43	Felix Neureuther; Germany	1:35.68
Alpine combined	Luca Aerni; Switzerland	2:26.33	Marcel Hirscher; Austria	2:26.34	Mauro Caviezel; Switzerland	2:26.39

=== Women's events ===
Event	Gold		Silver		Bronze	
Downhill	Ilka Štuhec; Slovenia	1:32.85	Stephanie Venier; Austria	1:33.25	Lindsey Vonn; United States	1:33.30
Super-G	Nicole Schmidhofer; Austria	1:21.34	Tina Weirather; Liechtenstein	1:21.67	Lara Gut; Switzerland	1:21.70
Giant slalom	Tessa Worley; France	2:05.55	Mikaela Shiffrin; United States	2:05.89	Sofia Goggia; Italy	2:06.29
Slalom	Mikaela Shiffrin; United States	1:37.27	Wendy Holdener; Switzerland	1:38.91	Frida Hansdotter; Sweden	1:39.02
Alpine combined	Wendy Holdener; Switzerland	1:58.88	Michelle Gisin; Switzerland	1:58.93	Michaela Kirchgasser; Austria	1:59.26

=== Mixed ===
Event	Gold	Silver	Bronze
Team event	France; Adeline Baud Mugnier; Nastasia Noens; Tessa Worley; Mathieu Faivre; Julien Lizeroux; Alexis Pinturault	Slovakia; Tereza Jančová; Veronika Velez-Zuzulová; Petra Vlhová; Matej Falat; Adam Žampa; Andreas Žampa	Sweden; Frida Hansdotter; Maria Pietilä Holmner; Emelie Wikström; Mattias Hargin; Gustav Lundbäck; Andre Myhrer

== Participating countries ==
A total of 77 countries are scheduled to compete.

- Afghanistan
- Albania
- Andorra
- Argentina
- Armenia
- Australia
- Austria
- Azerbaijan
- Belarus
- Belgium
- Bosnia and Herzegovina
- Bolivia
- Brazil
- Bulgaria
- Canada
- Chile
- China
- Colombia
- Croatia
- Cyprus
- Czech Republic
- Denmark
- Estonia
- Finland
- France
- Georgia
- Germany
- Great Britain
- Greece
- Haiti
- Hungary
- Iceland
- India
- Iran
- Ireland
- Israel
- Italy
- Jamaica
- Japan
- Kazakhstan
- Kenya
- Kosovo
- Kyrgyzstan
- Latvia
- Lebanon
- Liechtenstein
- Lithuania
- Luxembourg
- Macedonia
- Madagascar
- Malaysia
- Malta
- Mexico
- Montenegro
- Monaco
- Morocco
- Netherlands
- New Zealand
- Norway
- Peru
- Poland
- Portugal
- Romania
- Russia
- San Marino
- Serbia
- Slovakia
- Slovenia
- South Africa
- Spain
- Sweden
- Switzerland
- Tonga
- Ukraine
- United States
- Uzbekistan
- Venezuela
