= Merle Soppela =

Finnish alpine skier (born 1991)

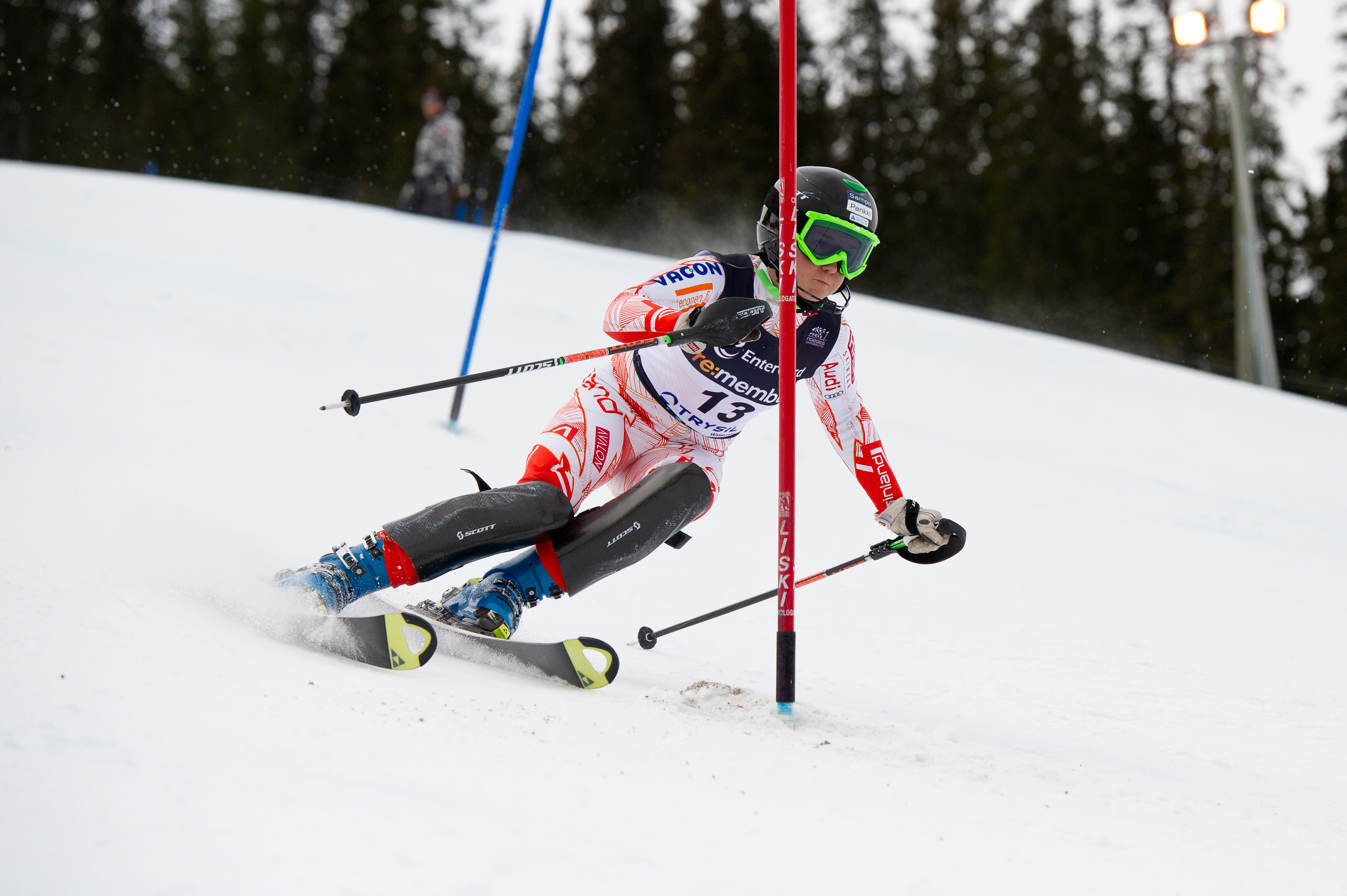
- Merle Soppela

Personal information
- Born: 1991 (age 34–35)

Skiing career
- Sport: Alpine skiing ♀

Merle Soppela (born 1991) is a retired Finnish alpine ski racer.

She competed at the 2015 World Championships in Beaver Creek, USA, in the giant slalom.
