= Gabriela Capová =

Czech alpine skier (born 1993)

Personal information
- Born: 10 August 1998 (age 27) Ostrava, Czech Republic

Skiing career
- Sport: Alpine skiing ♀
- Disciplines: slalom (Závod)

Gabriela Capová (born 1993) is a Czech alpine ski racer.

She competed at the 2015 World Championships in Beaver Creek, USA, in the slalom. She was born on 10 August 1993.
