= Šejla Merdanović =

Bosnian alpine skier (born 1997)

Personal information
- Born: 1997 (age 28–29) Bosnia and Herzegovina

Skiing career
- Sport: Alpine skiing

Šejla Merdanović (born 1997) is a Bosnian alpine ski racer.

She competed at the 2015 World Championships in Beaver Creek, USA, in the slalom.
