= Marjolein Decroix =

Belgian alpine skier (born 1992)

Personal information
- Born: 17 March 1992 (age 33) Poperinge, Belgium

Sport
- Country: Belgium
- Sport: Alpine skiing

Marjolein Decroix (born 17 March 1992) is a Belgian alpine skier, born in Poperinge. She competed in slalom at the 2018 Winter Olympics.
