= Ivana Bulatović =

Montenegrin alpine skier (born 1994)

Personal information
- Born: 12 October 1994 (age 31) Berane, FR Yugoslavia
Medal record
Alpine skiing
Representing Montenegro

Ivana Bulatović (born 12 October 1994 in Berane, Montenegro) is an alpine skier from Montenegro. She competed for Montenegro at the 2014 Winter Olympics in the slalom competition, and finished 44th overall. She was the first female athlete to represent the country at the Winter Olympics as well.

== See also ==
- Montenegro at the 2014 Winter Olympics
