= Agnese Āboltiņa =

Latvian alpine skier (born 1996)

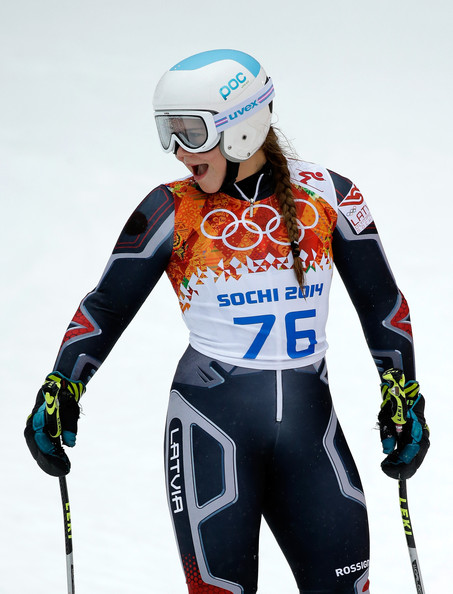

Personal information
- Nationality: Latvian
- Born: 7 February 1996 (age 30) Riga
- Occupation: Alpine skier

Sport
- Sport: 2014 Winter Olympics

Agnese Āboltiņa (born 7 February 1996) is a Latvian alpine skier. She was born in Riga and competed at the FIS Alpine World Ski Championships 2013 in Schladming, as well as at the 2014 Winter Olympics in Sochi, in giant slalom, slalom and super-G. She placed 31st in super-G and 37th in slalom at the 2014 Olympics.
