= FIS Alpine World Ski Championships 2011 – Women's slalom =

Complete results for Women's Slalom competition at the 2011 World Championships, run on Saturday, February 19. The tenth race of the championships, its first run at 10:00 local time (CET) and the second run 13:30. A total of 111 athletes from 46 countries competed.

== Results ==
Rank	Bib	Name	Nation	Run 1	Rank	Run 2	Rank	Total	Difference
1st place, gold medalist(s)	1	Marlies Schild	Austria	52.69	1	53.10	7	1:45.79	
2nd place, silver medalist(s)	5	Kathrin Zettel	Austria	53.30	3	52.83	2	1:46.13	+0.34
3rd place, bronze medalist(s)	3	Maria Pietilä Holmner	Sweden	53.48	4	52.96	4	1:46.44	+0.65
4	4	Maria Riesch	Germany	53.49	5	53.64	19	1:47.13	+1.34
5	8	Tina Maze	Slovenia	54.26	8	53.29	12	1:47.55	+1.76
6	13	Manuela Mölgg	Italy	54.37	9	53.28	11	1:47.65	+1.86
6	6	Tanja Poutiainen	Finland	52.90	2	54.75	24	1:47.65	+1.86
8	19	Frida Hansdotter	Sweden	54.66	11	53.18	9	1:47.84	+2.05
9	2	Nastasia Noens	France	54.56	10	53.62	18	1:48.18	+2.39
10	15	Veronika Zuzulová	Slovakia	55.25	16	52.94	3	1:48.19	+2.40
11	34	Irene Curtoni	Italy	55.25	16	53.25	10	1:48.50	+2.71
12	7	Šárka Záhrobská	Czech Republic	55.11	15	53.65	20	1:48.76	+2.97
13	16	Tessa Worley	France	55.47	18	53.34	13	1:48.81	+3.02
14	25	Anne-Sophie Barthet	France	55.80	21	53.04	6	1:48.84	+3.05
15	18	Fanny Chmelar	Germany	55.07	14	54.02	21	1:49.09	+3.30
16	36	Erin Mielzynski	Canada	57.36	29	52.07	1	1:49.43	+3.64
17	20	Ana Jelušić	Croatia	56.27	24	53.17	8	1:49.44	+3.65
18	11	Nicole Hosp	Austria	54.22	7	55.24	26	1:49.46	+3.67
19	32	Resi Stiegler	United States	56.08	23	53.39	14	1:49.47	+3.68
20	21	Nicole Gius	Italy	55.97	22	53.55	17	1:49.52	+3.73
21	28	Anna Goodman	Canada	56.97	28	52.98	5	1:49.95	+4.16
21	24	Denise Feierabend	Switzerland	55.68	20	54.27	22	1:49.95	+4.16
23	10	Katharina Dürr	Germany	56.68	26	53.45	15	1:50.13	+4.34
24	29	Emelie Wikström	Sweden	56.72	27	53.47	16	1:50.19	+4.40
25	9	Sandrine Aubert	France	55.47	18	55.18	25	1:50.65	+4.86
26	46	Jana Gantnerová	Slovakia	57.57	30	54.46	23	1:52.03	+6.24
27	45	Katarzyna Karasińska	Poland	57.83	32	55.69	27	1:53.52	+7.73
28	52	Sofija Novoselić	Croatia	57.81	31	55.99	28	1:53.80	+8.01
29	37	Megan McJames	United States	58.66	36	56.08	29	1:54.74	+8.95
30	53	Agnieszka Gąsienica-Daniel	Poland	57.98	33	57.66	32	1:55.64	+9.85
31	41	Eva Kurfürstová	Czech Republic	58.73	37	57.44	31	1:56.17	+10.38
32	51	Nevena Ignjatović	Serbia	58.80	38	57.42	30	1:56.22	+10.43
33	63	Karolina Chrapek	Poland	58.92	39	57.75	33	1:56.67	+10.88
34	67	Macarena Simari Birkner	Argentina	59.28	40	58.41	36	1:57.69	+11.90
35	62	Iva Misak	Croatia	59.85	41	58.35	35	1:58.20	+12.41
36	58	Lelde Gasuna	Latvia	1:01.46	42	59.71	38	2:01.17	+15.38
37	80	Zsófia Döme	Hungary	1:01.72	44	1:00.21	39	2:01.93	+16.14
38	57	María Belén Simari Birkner	Argentina	1:03.77	48	58.22	34	2:01.99	+16.20
39	76	Anna Berecz	Hungary	1:01.86	45	1:00.58	40	2:02.44	+16.65
40	81	Salome Bancora	Argentina	1:03.79	49	1:00.91	41	2:04.70	+18.91
41	39	Moe Hanaoka	Japan	1:07.26	53	59.16	37	2:06.42	+20.63
42	82	Nicole Valcareggi	Greece	1:04.77	51	1:02.73	42	2:07.50	+21.71
43	64	Sarah Jarvis	New Zealand	1:04.25	50	1:03.63	43	2:07.88	+22.09
44	91	Kseniya Grigoreva	Uzbekistan	1:06.28	52	1:04.25	44	2:10.53	+24.74
45	86	Tuğba Daşdemir	Turkey	1:08.82	55	1:04.87	45	2:13.69	+27.90
46	78	Elizabeth Pilat	Australia	1:08.75	54	1:05.66	46	2:14.41	+28.62
47	87	Qin Xiyue	China	1:10.51	57	1:09.17	47	2:19.68	+33.89
48	99	Donata Hellner	Hungary	1:10.58	58	1:09.66	48	2:20.24	+34.45
49	102	Szelina Hellner	Hungary	1:11.56	59	1:10.00	49	2:21.56	+35.77
50	92	Paraskevi Mavridou	Greece	1:11.56	59	1:10.03	50	2:21.59	+35.80
51	65	Lavinia Chrystal	Australia	1:02.18	46	1:27.25	51	2:29.43	+43.64
	22	Michaela Kirchgasser	Austria	53.93	6	DNF			
	12	Susanne Riesch	Germany	54.88	12	DNF			
	27	Sarah Schleper	United States	54.93	13	DNF			
	33	Wendy Holdener	Switzerland	56.48	25	DNF			
	38	Mizue Hoshi	Japan	58.06	34	DNF			
	35	Ève Routhier	Canada	58.44	35	DNF			
	68	Isabel van Buynder	Belgium	1:01.68	43	DNF			
	89	Malene Madsen	Denmark	1:09.35	56	DNF			
	88	Sandra-Elena Narea	Romania	1:02.38	47	DSQ			
	100	Liu Yang	China	1:15.10	61	DNQ			
	98	Fatemeh Kiadarbandsari	Iran	1:17.02	62	DNQ			
	103	Svetlana Baranova	Uzbekistan	1:18.48	63	DNQ			
	94	Marjan Kalhor	Iran	1:18.59	64	DNQ			
	109	Lida Zvoznikova	Kyrgyzstan	1:19.20	65	DNQ			
	104	Tatjana Baranova	Uzbekistan	1:20.98	66	DNQ			
	106	Sarah Ekmekejian	Lebanon	1:21.98	67	DNQ			
	105	Liu Yu	China	1:23.41	68	DNQ			
	107	Anne Libak Nielsen	Denmark	1:29.19	69	DNQ			
	85	Nino Tsiklauri	Georgia	DNS					
	108	Irina Volkova	Kyrgyzstan	DNS					
	14	Therese Borssén	Sweden	DNF					
	23	Marie-Michèle Gagnon	Canada	DNF					
	26	Marina Nigg	Liechtenstein	DNF					
	30	Maruša Ferk	Slovenia	DNF					
	31	Julia Mancuso	United States	DNF					
	42	Federica Brignone	Italy	DNF					
	43	Mireia Gutiérrez	Andorra	DNF					
	44	Karen Persy	Belgium	DNF					
	47	Rebecca Bühler	Liechtenstein	DNF					
	48	Vanessa Schädler	Liechtenstein	DNF					
	49	Michaela Smutná	Czech Republic	DNF					
	50	Jana Skvarkova	Slovakia	DNF					
	54	Aleksandra Klus	Poland	DNF					
	55	Kristina Saalova	Slovakia	DNF					
	56	Maria Kirkova	Bulgaria	DNF					
	59	Ksenia Alopina	Russia	DNF					
	60	Tea Palić	Croatia	DNF					
	61	Martina Dubovska	Czech Republic	DNF					
	66	Maja Klepić	Bosnia and Herzegovina	DNF					
	69	Íris Guðmundsdóttir	Iceland	DNF					
	70	Žana Novaković	Bosnia and Herzegovina	DNF					
	71	Bogdana Matsotska	Ukraine	DNF					
	72	Maria Shkanova	Belarus	DNF					
	73	Andrea Jardi	Spain	DNF					
	74	Julietta Quiroga	Argentina	DNF					
	75	Katrin Kristjansdottir	Iceland	DNF					
	79	Kristina Krone	Puerto Rico	DNF					
	83	Iulia Petruta Craciun	Romania	DNF					
	84	Xia Lina	China	DNF					
	93	Yom Hirshfeld	Israel	DNF					
	95	Ronnie Kiek-Gedalyahu	Israel	DNF					
	96	Ziba Kalhor	Iran	DNF					
	97	Liene Fimbauere	Latvia	DNF					
	101	Mitra Kalhor	Iran	DNF					
	110	Laura Bauer	South Africa	DNF					
	111	Siranush Maghakyan	Armenia	DNF					
	17	Christina Geiger	Germany	DSQ					
	40	Emi Hasegawa	Japan	DSQ					
	77	Sophia Ralli	Greece	DSQ					
	90	Ornella Oettl Reyes	Peru	DSQ					
