= FIS Alpine World Ski Championships 2013 – Women's slalom =

Women's slalom at the FIS Alpine World Ski Championships 2013
- Venue: Planai; Schladming, Austria
- Date: 16 February 2013
- Competitors: 139 from 53 nations
- Winning time: 1:39.85

Medalists
gold medal	Mikaela Shiffrin	United States
silver medal	Michaela Kirchgasser	Austria
bronze medal	Frida Hansdotter	Sweden

Complete results for Women's Slalom competition at the 2013 World Championships. It was the tenth race of the championships and 139 athletes from 53 countries competed.

== Results ==
The first run was started at 10:00 local time (UTC+1) and the second run at 13:30.

Rank	Bib	Name	Nation	Run 1	Rank	Run 2	Rank	Total	Difference
1st place, gold medalist(s)	5	Mikaela Shiffrin	United States	50.59	3	49.26	4	1:39.85	
2nd place, silver medalist(s)	10	Michaela Kirchgasser	Austria	50.96	6	49.11	2	1:40.07	+0.22
3rd place, bronze medalist(s)	2	Frida Hansdotter	Sweden	50.41	1	49.70	12	1:40.11	+0.26
4	3	Tanja Poutiainen	Finland	50.58	2	49.88	18	1:40.46	+0.61
5	1	Tina Maze	Slovenia	50.88	5	49.73	14	1:40.61	+0.76
6	8	Maria Pietilä-Holmner	Sweden	51.92	13	48.99	1	1:40.91	+1.06
7	4	Veronika Zuzulová	Slovakia	51.21	7	49.97	20	1:41.18	+1.33
8	21	Šárka Záhrobská	Czech Republic	51.87	11	49.35	6	1:41.22	+1.37
9	11	Marlies Schild	Austria	51.84	10	49.59	7	1:41.43	+1.58
10	6	Kathrin Zettel	Austria	51.92	12	49.61	9	1:41.52	+1.67
11	13	Wendy Holdener	Switzerland	52.00	14	49.62	10	1:41.62	+1.77
12	17	Bernadette Schild	Austria	52.46	20	49.20	3	1:41.66	+1.81
13	12	Marie-Michèle Gagnon	Canada	51.80	8	49.90	19	1:41.70	+1.85
14	28	Chiara Costazza	Italy	52.42	17	49.33	5	1:41.75	+1.90
15	19	Nicole Hosp	Austria	51.82	9	50.08	21	1:41.90	+2.05
16	20	Nathalie Eklund	Sweden	52.25	15	49.83	17	1:42.08	+2.23
17	15	Erin Mielzynski	Canada	52.42	17	49.82	16	1:42.24	+2.39
18	27	Laurie Mougel	France	52.59	21	49.72	13	1:42.31	+2.46
19	30	Sandrine Aubert	France	52.92	22	49.65	11	1:42.66	+2.81
20	22	Nastasia Noens	France	53.01	23	49.65	15	1:42.68	+2.83
21	18	Lena Dürr	Germany	52.42	17	50.50	25	1:42.92	+3.07
22	26	Resi Stiegler	United States	53.44	26	49:60	8	1:43.04	+3.19
23	16	Anna Swenn-Larsson	Sweden	52.30	16	50.78	26	1:43.08	+3.23
24	25	Anne-Sophie Barthet	France	53.07	24	50.29	22	1:43.36	+3.51
25	24	Manuela Mölgg	Italy	53.43	25	50.36	24	1:43.79	+3.94
26	35	Michelle Gisin	Switzerland	53.86	29	50.35	23	1:44.21	+4.36
27	51	Katarina Lavtar	Slovenia	53.76	28	50.83	27	1:44.59	+4.74
28	37	Elli Terwiel	Canada	53.93	30	51.13	28	1:45.06	+5.21
29	40	Marina Nigg	Liechtenstein	53.97	31	51.86	30	1:45.83	+5.98
30	29	Brittany Phelan	Canada	54.46	33	51.68	29	1:46.14	+6.29
31	44	Ana Bucik	Slovenia	54.23	32	52.02	33	1:46.25	+6.40
32	48	Jana Gantnerová	Slovakia	54.52	35	51.95	31	1:46.47	+6.62
33	60	Daria Astapenko	Russia	54.48	34	52.00	32	1:46.48	+6.63
34	41	Nevena Ignjatović	Serbia	54.62	37	52.34	36	1:46.96	+7.11
35	45	Martina Dubovská	Czech Republic	55.34	41	52.05	34	1:47.39	+7.54
36	46	Agnieszka Gąsienica Daniel	Poland	55.48	42	52.19	35	1:47.67	+7.82
37	36	Mizue Hoshi	Japan	55.07	40	52.85	38	1:47.92	+8.07
38	58	Sofija Novoselić	Croatia	55.70	45	52.70	37	1:48.40	+8.55
39	50	Aleksandra Klus	Poland	55.84	46	53.29	39	1:49.13	+9.28
40	53	Ksenia Alopina	Russia	55.62	43	53.92	40	1:49.54	+9.69
41	52	Eva Kurfürstová	Czech Republic	55.63	44	54.07	41	1:49.70	+9.85
42	38	Barbora Lukáčová	Slovakia	57.03	48	54.64	42	1:51.67	+11.82
43	72	Iva Mišak	Croatia	57.12	49	54.70	43	1:51.82	+11.97
44	31	Emiko Kiyosawa	Japan	54.85	39	57.15	54	1:52.00	+12.15
45	54	Greta Small	Australia	56.96	47	55.37	46	1:52.33	+12.48
46	68	Maria Kirkova	Bulgaria	57.32	50	55.44	47	1:52.76	+12.91
47	71	Andrea Komšić	Croatia	58.12	55	55.04	45	1:53.16	+13.31
48	80	Joanna Frick	Liechtenstein	58.49	58	54.86	44	1:53.35	+13.50
49	75	Lelde Gasūna	Latvia	57.86	52	56.05	51	1:53.91	+14.06
50	59	Macarena Simari Birkner	Argentina	58.15	56	55.79	48	1:53.94	+14.09
51	67	Matea Ferk	Croatia	58.01	54	55.95	49	1:53.96	+14.11
52	65	María Guðmundsdóttir	Iceland	58.21	57	56.25	52	1:54.46	+14.61
53	61	Salome Bancora	Argentina	58.99	60	56.01	50	1:55.00	+15.15
54	73	Harriet Miller-Brown	New Zealand	57.87	53	57.49	55	1:55.36	+15.51
55	77	Helga María Vilhjálmsdóttir	Iceland	58.63	59	56.77	53	1:55.40	+15.55
	7	Maria Höfl-Riesch	Germany	50.61	4	DNF			
	39	Mona Løseth	Norway	53.52	27	DNF			
	32	Michela Azzola	Italy	54.56	36	DNF			
	34	Emi Hasegawa	Japan	54.71	38	DNF			
	64	Maria Shkanova	Belarus	57.65	51	DNF			
61	76	Bogdana Matsotska	Ukraine	59.17	61				
62	63	Mandy Dirkzwager	Netherlands	1:00.29	62				
63	79	Anna Berecz	Hungary	1:00.68	63				
64	83	Eria-Gudyn Helgadóttir	Iceland	1:01.16	64				
65	94	Tetyana Tikun	Ukraine	1:01.80	65				
66	84	Charlotte Techen Lemgart	Denmark	1:01.90	66				
67	93	Maša Janković	Serbia	1:03.20	67				
68	89	Anastasiya Gorbunova	Russia	1:03.21	68				
69	91	Roksana Tymchenko	Ukraine	1:03.56	69				
70	125	Ornella Öttl Reyes	Peru	1:03.58	70				
71	106	Sophia Ralli	Greece	1:03.62	71				
72	82	Eria Ásgeirsdóttir	Iceland	1:03.83	72				
73	81	Marjolein Decroix	Belgium	1:03.85	73				
74	95	Elise Pellegrin	Malta	1:04.59	74				
75	116	Veronika Tomić	Serbia	1:05.82	75				
76	87	Kristina Krone	Puerto Rico	1:06.06	76				
77	118	Yom Hirshfeld	Israel	1:06.72	77				
78	98	Sumejja Hadžić	Bosnia and Herzegovina	1:06.74	78				
79	100	Ronnie Kiek	Israel	1:07.31	79				
80	105	Paraskevi Mavridou	Greece	1:07.58	80				
81	96	Victoria Bell	Ireland	1:08.06	81				
82	117	Donáta Hellner	Hungary	1:08.92	82				
83	97	Ieva Meldere	Latvia	1:10.18	83				
84	112	Fatemeh Kiadarbandsari	Iran	1:10.21	84				
85	120	Zsuzsanna Ury	Hungary	1:10.21	85				
86	109	Veronica Gaspar	United States Virgin Islands	1:10.26	86				
87	110	Natacha Mohbat	Lebanon	1:10.28	87				
88	115	Ziba Kalhor	Iran	1:10.59	88				
89	113	Marjan Kalhor	Iran	1:10.73	89				
90	104	Ivana Bulatović	Montenegro	1:11.63	90				
91	122	Alexandra Taylor	Cyprus	1:12.79	91				
92	124	Szelina Hellner	Hungary	1:13.03	92				
93	134	Jacky Chamoun	Lebanon	1:13.43	93				
94	130	Lea Nassar	Lebanon	1:13.52	94				
95	114	Mitra Kalhor	Iran	1:14.89	95				
96	121	Celine Keirouz	Lebanon	1:15.42	96				
97	129	Svetlana Baranova	Uzbekistan	1:16.24	97				
98	119	Anna Bondare	Latvia	1:20.02	98				
99	131	Tatjana Baranova	Uzbekistan	1:21.86	99				
100	137	Aanchal Thakur	India	1:27.63	100				
101	136	Varsha Devi	India	1:50.43	101				
102	135	Huang Pei-chen	Chinese Taipei	1:53.05	102				
	9	Irene Curtoni	Italy	DNF					
	14	Christina Geiger	Germany	DNF					
	23	Nina Løseth	Norway	DNF					
	33	Petra Vlhová	Slovakia	DNF					
	42	Anna Sorokina	Russia	DNF					
	43	Merle Soppela	Finland	DNF					
	47	Karen Persyn	Belgium	DNF					
	49	Kateřina Pauláthová	Czech Republic	DNF					
	55	María Belén Simari Birkner	Argentina	DNF					
	56	Eli Plut	Slovenia	DNF					
	57	Mirela Gutiérrez	Andorra	DNF					
	62	Anna-Laura Bühler	Liechtenstein	DNF					
	66	Nicol Gastaldi	Argentina	DNF					
	69	Isabel van Buynder	Belgium	DNF					
	70	Žana Novaković	Bosnia and Herzegovina	DNF					
	74	Noelle Barahona	Chile	DNF					
	78	Maryna Gąsienica-Daniel	Poland	DNF					
	85	Lina Xia	China	DNF					
	86	Piera Hudson	New Zealand	DNF					
	88	Xiyue Qin	China	DNF					
	90	Amira Halilović	Bosnia and Herzegovina	DNF					
	92	Yang Li	China	DNF					
	99	Stefanie Vyhmeister	Chile	DNF					
	101	Ksenia Grigoreva	Uzbekistan	DNF					
	102	Malene Madsen	Denmark	DNF					
	103	Macarena Montesinos	Chile	DNF					
	107	Kristina Kusmuk	Bosnia and Herzegovina	DNF					
	108	Anastasia Kokkini	Greece	DNF					
	111	Ieva Januškevičiūtė	Lithuania	DNF					
	123	Areti Maragkou	Greece	DNF					
	126	Mary Photiades	Cyprus	DNF					
	128	Federica Selva	San Marino	DNF					
	132	Javiera Cea	Chile	DNF					
	133	Laura Bauer	South Africa	DNF					
	138	Eleonora Chiaruzzi	San Marino	DNF					
	139	Tatevik Muradyan	Armenia	DNF					
	127	Gitit Buchler	Israel	DNS					
