= Erin Mielzynski =

Canadian alpine skier (born 1990)

Personal information
- Born: 25 May 1990 (age 36) Brampton, Ontario, Canada
- Height: 169 cm (5 ft 7 in)
- Website: erinmielzynski.com

Skiing career
- Sport: Alpine skiing
- Club: Georgian Peaks
- Retired: 23 April 2022 (age 31)
- Disciplines: Slalom, giant slalom
- World Cup debut: 29 November 2009 (age 19)

Olympics
- Teams: 3 – (2010, 2014, 2018)
- Medals: 0

World Championships
- Teams: 6 – (2011–2021)
- Medals: 1 (team)

World Cup
- Seasons: 11th – (2011–2021)
- Wins: 1 – (1 SL)
- Podiums: 2 – (2 SL)
- Overall titles: 0 – (38th in 2019)
- Discipline titles: 0 – (12th in SL, 2019)
Medal record
Women's alpine skiing
Representing Canada
World Championships
Silver medal – second place	2015 Beaver Creek	Team event

Erin Mielzynski (born 25 May 1990) is a Canadian former World Cup alpine ski racer. She primarily competed in technical events and specialized in slalom.

Born in Brampton, Ontario, Mielzynski made her World Cup debut in November 2009 and has competed in three Winter Olympics and five World Championships.

She won her first World Cup race in March 2012 in slalom at Ofterschwang, Germany, her first top-ten finish. It was the first World Cup victory for a Canadian woman in over four years, when Emily Brydon won a Super G in February 2008 at St. Moritz, Switzerland. It was also the first World Cup win in slalom for a Canadian woman in over 41 years; Betsy Clifford won at Schruns, Austria in January 1971.

In January 2022, Mielzynski was named to Canada's 2022 Olympic team.

== World Cup results ==
=== Season standings ===
Season	Age	Overall	Slalom	Giant Slalom	Super G	Downhill	Combined
2010	19	131	58	—	—	—	—
2011	20	97	35	—	—	—	—
2012	21	42	15	—	—	—	—
2013	22	40	13	—	—	—	—
2014	23	70	30	42	—	—	26
2015	24	42	14	—	—	—	—
2016	25	54	17	—	—	—	41
2017	26	61	21	—	—	—	—
2018	27	43	15	—	—	—	—
2019	28	38	12	—	—	—	—
2020	29	70	21	—	—	—	—
2021	30	45	11	—	—	—	—

Standings through 21 February 2021

=== Top ten finishes ===
- 1 win – (1 SL)
- 2 podiums – (2 SL); 19 top tens

Season	Date	Location	Discipline	Place
2012	4 Mar 2012	Ofterschwang, Germany	Slalom	1st
2013	20 Dec 2012	Åre, Sweden	Slalom	5th
2013	1 Jan 2013	Munich, Germany	Parallel slalom	9th
2013	4 Jan 2013	Zagreb, Croatia	Slalom	3rd
2013	15 Jan 2013	Flachau, Austria	Slalom	10th
2013	16 Mar 2013	Lenzerheide, Switzerland	Slalom	10th
2015	4 Jan 2015	Zagreb, Croatia	Slalom	6th
2015	21 Mar 2015	Méribel, France	Slalom	8th
2016	28 Nov 2015	(United States) Aspen, USA	Slalom	10th
2016	29 Nov 2015	(United States) Aspen, USA	Slalom	4th
2017	29 Dec 2016	Semmering, Austria	Slalom	9th
2018	3 Jan 2018	Zagreb, Croatia	Slalom	7th
2018	28 Jan 2018	Lenzerheide, Switzerland	Parallel slalom	8th
2018	10 Mar 2018	Ofterschwang, Germany	Slalom	7th
2018	17 Mar 2018	Åre, Sweden	Slalom	10th
2019	9 Dec 2018	St. Moritz, Switzerland	Parallel slalom	7th
2019	22 Dec 2018	Courchevel, France	Slalom	8th
2019	1 Jan 2019	Oslo, Norway	Parallel slalom	5th
2021	3 Jan 2021	Zagreb, Croatia	Slalom	5th

== World Championship results ==
Year	Age	Slalom	Giant slalom	Super-G	Downhill	Combined	Team event
2011	20	16	—	—	—	—	—
2013	22	17	—	—	—	—	4
2015	24	6	—	—	—	—	2
2017	26	15	—	—	—	—	5
2019	28	10	—	—	—	—	9
2021	30	DNF2	—	—	—	—	7

== Olympic results ==
Year	Age	Slalom	Giant slalom	Super-G	Downhill	Combined	Team event
2010	19	20	—	—	—	—	not run
2014	23	DNF1	21	—	—	—	not run
2018	27	11	—	—	—	—	9
2022	31	16	—	—	—	—	—
