= Michaela Kirchgasser =

Austrian alpine skier

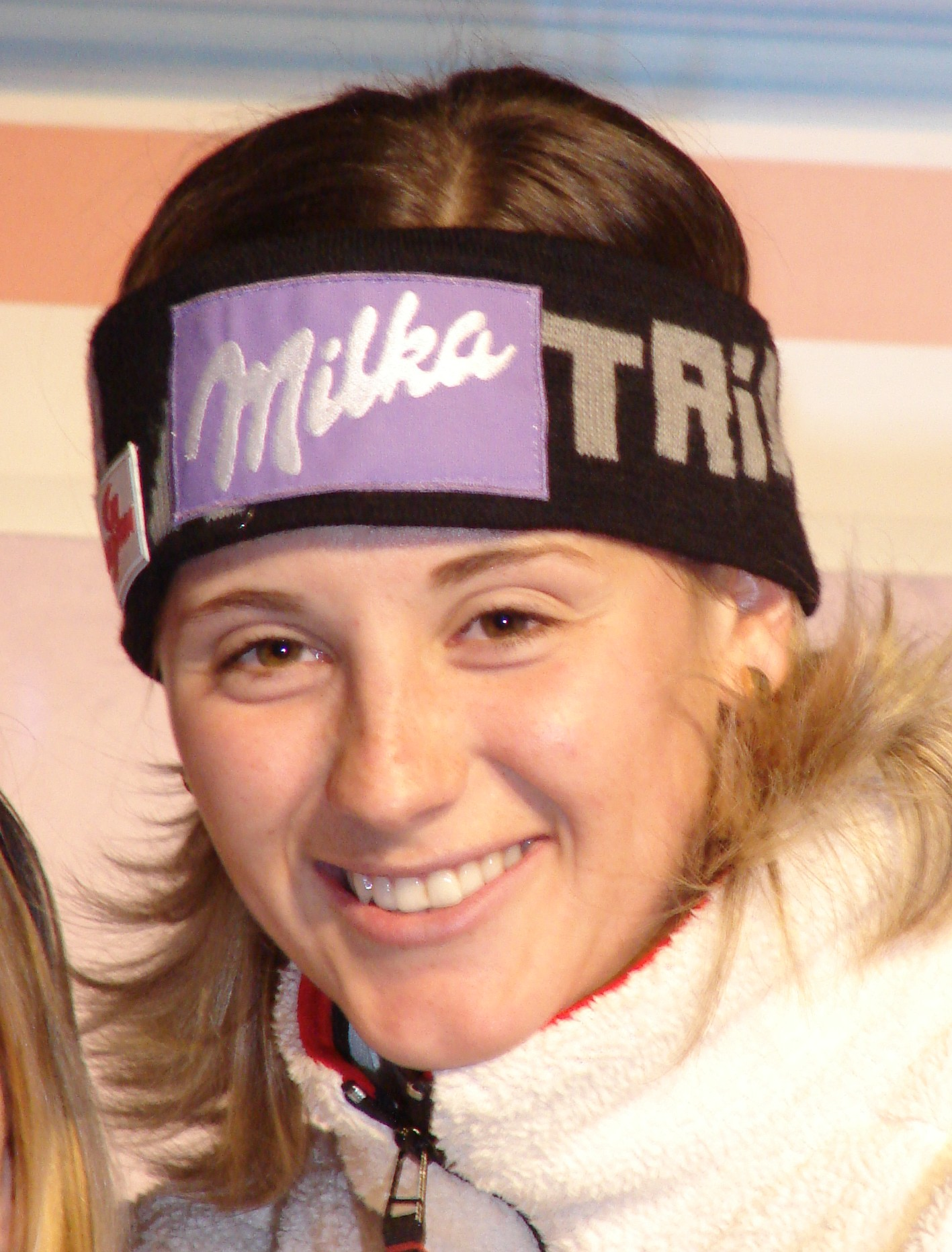
- Kirchgasser in December 2006

Personal information
- Born: 18 March 1985 (age 41) Schwarzach im Pongau, Salzburg, Austria
- Height: 1.69 m (5 ft 7 in)
- Website: kirchi.com

Skiing career
- Sport: Alpine skiing
- Club: Union Sportklub; Raika Filzmoos
- Retired: 10 March 2018 (age 32)
- Disciplines: Slalom, giant slalom, combined
- World Cup debut: 9 December 2001 (age 16)

Olympics
- Teams: 3 – (2006–2014)
- Medals: 0

World Championships
- Teams: 6 – (2007–2017)
- Medals: 7 (3 gold)

World Cup
- Seasons: 14 – (2004–2017)
- Wins: 3 – (1 GS, 2 SL)
- Podiums: 17
- Overall titles: 0 – (8th in 2007)
- Discipline titles: 0 – (2nd in SL, 2012)
Medal record
World Championships
| Gold medal – first place | 2007 Åre | Team event |
| Gold medal – first place | 2013 Schladming | Team event |
| Gold medal – first place | 2015 Beaver Creek | Team event |
| Silver medal – second place | 2011 Garmisch | Team event |
| Silver medal – second place | 2013 Schladming | Slalom |
| Bronze medal – third place | 2015 Beaver Creek | Combined |
| Bronze medal – third place | 2017 St. Moritz | Combined |
Junior World Championships
| Gold medal – first place | 2003 Briançonnais | Slalom |
| Silver medal – second place | 2003 Briançonnais | Combined |
| Bronze medal – third place | 2005 Bardonecchia | Giant slalom |

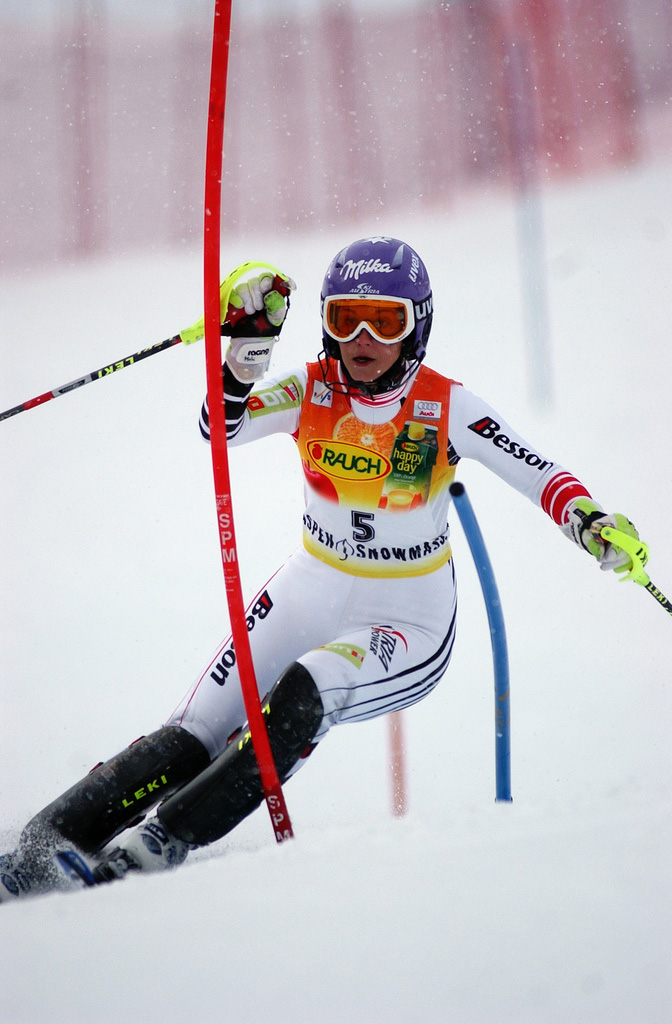
Kirchgasser at Aspen in November 2006

Michaela Kirchgasser (born 18 March 1985) is a retired Austrian alpine ski racer. She raced in the technical events of slalom and giant slalom, and also the combined.

== Career ==
On 25 November 2006, Kirchgasser made her first World Cup podium with a third place in the giant slalom at Aspen, Colorado. Her first victory was on 24 February 2007, in a giant slalom at Sierra Nevada, Spain.

She has competed in three Olympics and six World Championships. At the 2006 Winter Olympics, she finished fifth in the slalom and sixth in the combined, but failed to finish in the giant slalom. At the 2007 World Championships she won the gold medal with the Austrian team in the team event, and finished fourth in the giant slalom and ninth in the slalom. She took a total of seven World Championship medals during her career.

Kirchgasser attained her first World Cup podium in slalom in January 2012 at Zagreb, Croatia. Less than three weeks later, she won her first World Cup slalom at Kranjska Gora, Slovenia. Kirchgasser won again in the slalom at the World Cup finals in Schladming to finish second in the slalom season standings, runner-up to compatriot Marlies Schild.

She retired from competition in 2018, with her final World Cup start being in a slalom in Ofterschwang, which she raced whilst wearing a bright pink dress.

Michaela Kirchgasser married Sebastian Kirchgasser on 7 May 2016 - despite having the same last name they are not related.

== World Cup results ==
=== Season standings ===
| Season | Age | Overall | Slalom | Giant slalom | Super-G | Downhill | Combined |
|---|---|---|---|---|---|---|---|
| 2002 | 16 | 89 | 33 | — | — | — | — |
| 2003 | 17 | 81 | 36 | — | — | — | — |
| 2004 | 18 | 63 | 25 | 48 | — | — | — |
| 2005 | 19 | 58 | 31 | 25 | — | — | — |
| 2006 | 20 | 20 | 14 | 9 | — | — | 20 |
| 2007 | 21 | 8 | 13 | 3 | — | — | 4 |
| 2008 | 22 | 33 | 13 | 18 | — | — | 21 |
| 2009 | 23 | 22 | 20 | 10 | — | — | 17 |
| 2010 | 24 | 19 | 24 | 15 | 36 | 51 | 3 |
| 2011 | 25 | 21 | 16 | 17 | 47 | 48 | 6 |
| 2012 | 26 | 10 | 2 | 21 | — | — | — |
| 2013 | 27 | 14 | 12 | 16 | — | — | 3 |
| 2014 | 28 | 25 | 15 | 30 | — | — | 2 |
| 2015 | 29 | 29 | 16 | 22 | — | — | 8 |
| 2016 | 30 | 15 | 10 | 12 | 50 | 54 | 3 |
| 2017 | 31 | 28 | 26 | 18 | — | — | 4 |
| 2018 | 32 | 94 | 41 | — | — | — | — |

- Standings through 4 February 2018

=== Race podiums ===
- 3 wins – (1 GS, 2 SL)
- 17 podiums – (5 GS, 3 SL, 7 AC, 2 PSL)

| Season | Date | Location | Discipline | Place |
|---|---|---|---|---|
| 2007 | 25 Nov 2006 | (United States) Aspen, USA | Giant slalom | 3rd |
| 2007 | 15 Dec 2006 | Reiteralm, Austria | Super combined | 2nd |
| 2007 | 24 Feb 2007 | Sierra Nevada, Spain | Giant slalom | 1st |
| 2007 | 10 Mar 2007 | Zwiesel, Germany | Giant slalom | 3rd |
| 2007 | 18 Mar 2007 | Lenzerheide, Switzerland | Giant slalom | 3rd |
| 2009 | 25 Jan 2009 | Cortina d'Ampezzo, Italy | Giant slalom | 2nd |
| 2010 | 29 Jan 2010 | St. Moritz, Switzerland | Super combined | 2nd |
| 2012 | 3 Jan 2012 | Zagreb, Croatia | Slalom | 3rd |
| 2012 | 22 Jan 2012 | Kranjska Gora, Slovenia | Slalom | 1st |
| 2012 | 21 Feb 2012 | Moscow, Russia | Parallel slalom | 2nd |
| 2012 | 17 Mar 2012 | Schladming, Austria | Slalom | 1st |
| 2013 | 1 Jan 2013 | Munich, Germany | Parallel slalom | 3rd |
| 2013 | 24 Feb 2013 | Méribel, France | Super combined | 3rd |
| 2014 | 12 Jan 2014 | Altenmarkt, Austria | Super combined | 2nd |
| 2016 | 18 Dec 2015 | Val d'Isère, France | Super combined | 3rd |
| 2016 | 13 Mar 2016 | Lenzerheide, Switzerland | Super combined | 2nd |
| 2017 | 24 Feb 2017 | Crans-Montana, Switzerland | Super combined | 3rd |

== World Championship results ==
| Year | Age | Slalom | Giant slalom | Super-G | Downhill | Combined | Team event |
|---|---|---|---|---|---|---|---|
| 2007 | 21 | 9 | 4 | — | — | DSQ1 | 1 |
| 2009 | 23 | DNF1 | 5 | — | — | DSQ1 | cancelled |
| 2011 | 25 | DNF2 | — | — | — | 13 | 2 |
| 2013 | 27 | 2 | DSQ1 | — | — | 4 | 1 |
| 2015 | 29 | DNF2 | 6 | — | — | 3 | 1 |
| 2017 | 31 | 6 | 12 | — | — | 3 | — |

== Olympic results ==
| Year | Age | Slalom | Giant slalom | Super-G | Downhill | Combined |
|---|---|---|---|---|---|---|
| 2006 | 20 | 5 | DNF2 | — | — | 6 |
| 2010 | 24 | DNF2 | 15 | — | — | 9 |
| 2014 | 28 | DNF2 | 12 | — | — | 7 |
