= Veronika Velez-Zuzulová =

Slovak alpine skier (born 1984)

Veronika Valette-Zuzulová
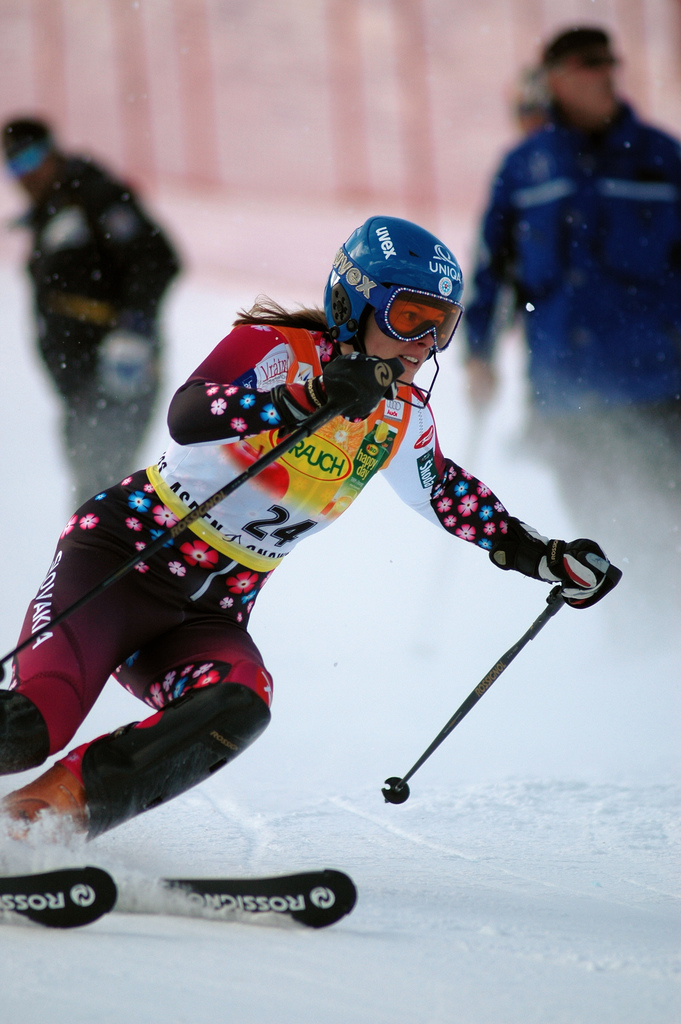
- Zuzulová at Aspen in November 2006

Personal information
- Born: Veronika Zuzulová; 15 July 1984 (age 42) Bratislava, Czechoslovakia
- Height: 1.72 m (5 ft 8 in)
- Website: zuzulova.com

Skiing career
- Sport: Alpine skiing
- Club: Vojenské športové centrum Dukla Banská Bystrica
- Retired: 10 March 2018 (age 33)
- Disciplines: Slalom
- World Cup debut: 28 October 2000 (age 16)

Olympics
- Teams: 4 – (2002, 2006, 2010, 2018)
- Medals: 0

World Championships
- Teams: 8 – (2001, 2005-17)
- Medals: 1 (0 gold)

World Cup
- Seasons: 17 – (2001–2013, 2015–2018)
- Wins: 5 – (4 SL, 1 CE)
- Podiums: 30 – (27 SL, 3 CE)
- Overall titles: 0 – (12th in 2013)
- Discipline titles: 0 – (2nd in SL, 2016 & 2017)
Medal record
Women's alpine skiing
Representing Slovakia
International alpine ski competitions
Event	1st	2nd	3rd
Olympic Games	0	0	0
World Championships	0	1	0
Total	0	1	0
World Championships
Silver medal – second place	2017 St. Moritz	Team event
Junior World Ski Championships
Gold medal – first place	2002 Sella Nevea	Slalom
New Zealand Winter Games
Gold medal – first place	2011 Queenstown	Giant Slalom
Gold medal – first place	2011 Queenstown	Slalom

Veronika Valette-Zuzulová (née Zuzulová; born 15 July 1984) is a retired Slovak alpine ski racer. Born in Bratislava, she specialised in the slalom and was the most successful Slovak alpine skier before Petra Vlhová. She was coached by her father Timotej Zuzula and Vladimír Kovár. In april 2012, she married coach Romain Velez and added her maiden name to her married name becoming Velez-Zuzulová. They divorced in August 2022. In September 2025 she married french Gaspard Valette

Valette-Zuzulová started skiing at age 3; at 14 she won the Trofeo Topolino in Italy, an unofficial children's world championship.

== Europa Cup ==
She started competing in the Europa Cup from the 2000/2001 season, and she took Europa Cup race wins on 21 December 2003, 23 February 2004 and 19 December 2006, and 3rd place on 6 and 22 February 2004.

== World Championships ==
At the 2007 World Championships in Åre, Sweden, she scored 9th place in super combined, 13th place in slalom and 21st place in giant slalom.

Velez-Zuzulová was part of the Slovakian team which took a surprise silver in the team event at the 2017 World Championships in St. Moritz, defeating Germany, Italy and Switzerland before being beaten by France in the final on time by eight hundredths of a second after a 2-2 tie.

== World Cup ==
Velez-Zuzulová made her World Cup debut in a giant slalom at Sölden, Austria, on 28 October 2000. In November 2002, she started competing in slalom. Her first major win was in 2002 when she became the World Junior Champion. Her first run in super combined was in 2006.

Across her career, Velez-Zuzulová took 30 World Cup podiums with five victories, all in slalom (or parallel slalom). Her best results in the World Cup season standings came in the 2016 and 2017 seasons, when she finished second in the slalom discipline. In the 2013 season, she finished third in slalom and 12th overall; she also finished third in slalom in 2008. She retired from competition in 2018, with her final World Cup start being in a slalom in Ofterschwang.

=== Season results ===
Season	Age	Overall	Slalom	Giant Slalom	Combined
2002	17	68	23	—	—
2003	18	injured			
2004	19	42	15	—	—
2005	20	37	9	—	—
2006	21	77	28	—	44
2007	22	19	5	32	37
2008	23	15	3	41	—
2009	24	65	22	—	—
2010	25	94	36	—	—
2011	26	19	5	42	—
2012	27	17	4	42	—
2013	28	12	3	—	—
2014	29	injured			
2015	30	24	6	—	—
2016	31	13	2	—	—
2017	32	11	2	—	—
2018	33	97	42	—	—

- Standings through 4 February 2018

=== Race podiums ===
- 5 wins – (4 SL, 1 CE)
- 30 podiums – (27 SL, 3 CE)

Season	Date	Location	Discipline	Place
2004	8 Feb 2004	Zwiesel, Germany	Slalom	3rd
2007	7 Jan 2007	Kranjska Gora, Slovenia	Slalom	3rd
2007	25 Feb 2007	Sierra Nevada, Spain	Slalom	3rd
2007	17 Mar 2007	Lenzerheide, Switzerland	Slalom	3rd
2008	6 Jan 2008	Špindlerův Mlýn, Czech Republic	Slalom	2nd
2008	13 Jan 2008	Maribor, Slovenia	Slalom	2nd
2008	15 Feb 2008	Zagreb, Croatia	Slalom	3rd
2008	14 Mar 2008	Bormio, Italy	Slalom	2nd
2011	4 Feb 2011	Zwiesel, Germany	Slalom	2nd
2011	18 Mar 2011	Lenzerheide, Switzerland	Slalom	3rd
2012	22 Jan 2012	Kranjska Gora, Slovenia	Slalom	3rd
2012	10 Mar 2012	Åre, Sweden	Slalom	2nd
2012	17 Mar 2012	Schladming, Austria	Slalom	2nd
2013	29 Dec 2012	Semmering, Austria	Slalom	1st
2013	1 Jan 2013	Munich, Germany	City event	1st
2013	29 Jan 2013	Moscow, Russia	City event	2nd
2015	22 Feb 2015	Maribor, Slovenia	Slalom	2nd
2015	14 Mar 2015	Åre, Sweden	Slalom	2nd
2015	21 Mar 2015	Méribel, France	Slalom	3rd
2016	28 Nov 2015	(United States) Aspen, USA	Slalom	2nd
2016	5 Jan 2016	Santa Caterina, Italy	Slalom	3rd
2016	12 Jan 2016	Flachau, Austria	Slalom	1st
2016	15 Jan 2016	Flachau, Austria	Slalom	1st
2016	6 Mar 2016	Jasná, Slovakia	Slalom	3rd
2016	19 Mar 2016	St. Moritz, Switzerland	Slalom	2nd
2017	27 Nov 2016	(United States) Killington, USA	Slalom	2nd
2017	11 Dec 2016	Sestriere, Italy	Slalom	2nd
2017	29 Dec 2016	Semmering, Austria	Slalom	2nd
2017	3 Jan 2017	Zagreb, Croatia	Slalom	1st
2017	31 Jan 2017	Stockholm, Sweden	City event	2nd

== World Championship results ==
Year	Age	Slalom	Giant slalom	Super-G	Downhill	Combined	Team event
2001	16	DNF1	34	—	—	—	—
2003	18	injured, did not compete					
2005	20	DSQ1	—	—	—	—	—
2007	22	13	21	—	—	9	—
2009	24	—	DNS1	—	—	—	—
2011	26	10	15	—	—	—	—
2013	28	7	—	—	—	—	9
2015	30	4	—	—	—	—	—
2017	32	DNF2	—	—	—	—	2

== Olympic results ==
Year	Age	Slalom	Giant slalom	Super-G	Downhill	Combined
2002	17	DNF1	32	—	—	—
2006	21	22	—	—	—	15
2010	25	10	DNS2	—	—	—
2014	29	injured, did not compete				
2018	33	17	—	—	—	—

Olympic Games
Preceded by Zdeno Chára	Flagbearer for Slovakia; PyeongChang 2018	Succeeded by Marek Hrivík & Katarína Šimoňáková
