= Nadja Kamer =

Swiss alpine skier (born 1986)

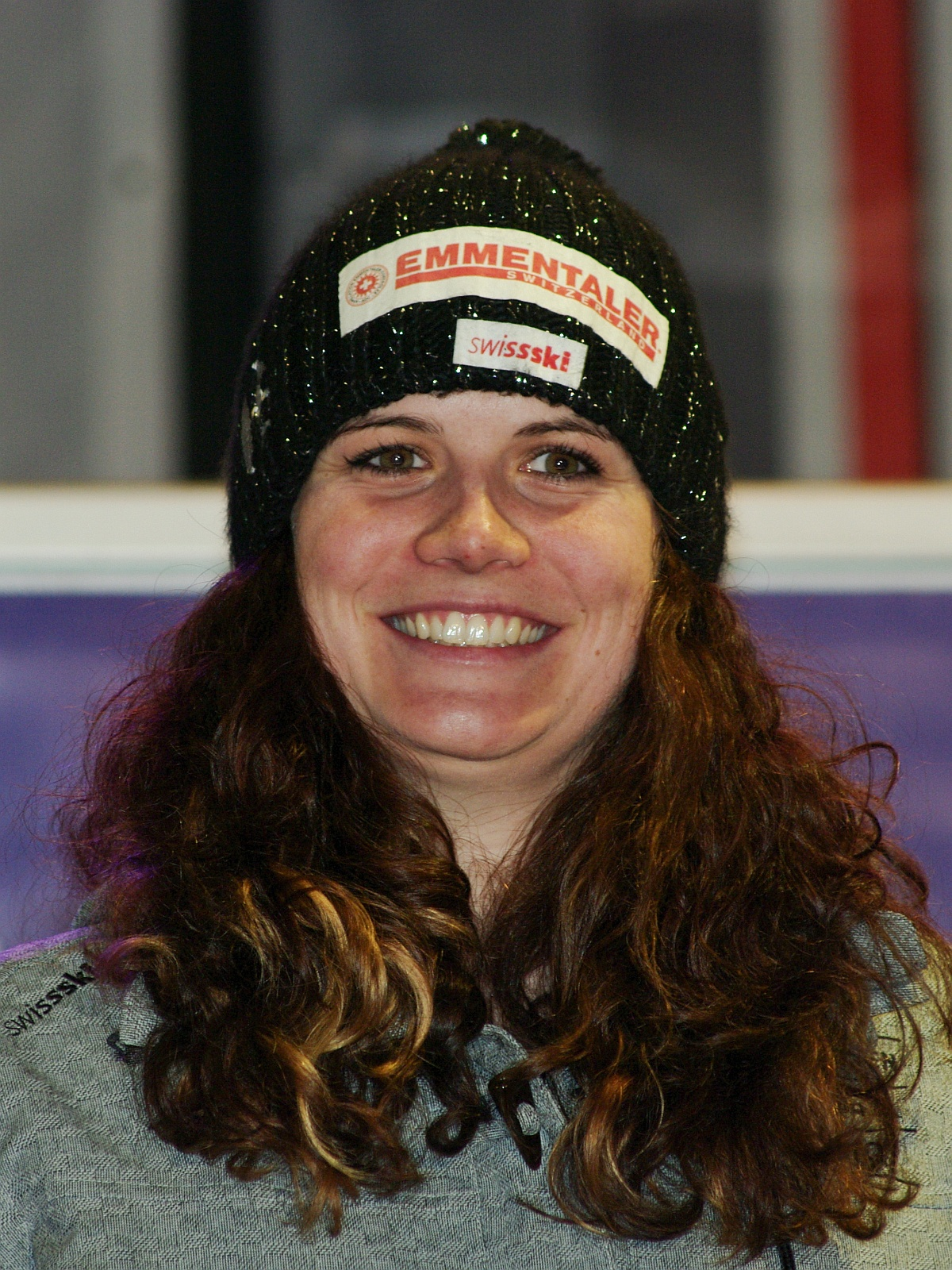
- Kamer in January 2011

Personal information
- Born: 23 July 1986 (age 40) Schwyz, Switzerland
- Height: 1.78 m (5 ft 10 in)
- Website: nadjakamer.ch

Skiing career
- Sport: Alpine skiing
- Disciplines: Downhill, Super G, Combined
- World Cup debut: 7 January 2005 (age 18)

Olympics
- Teams: 1 – (2010)
- Medals: 0

World Championships
- Teams: 3 – (2011–15)
- Medals: 0

World Cup
- Seasons: 8th – (2008–15)
- Wins: 0
- Podiums: 5 – (5 DH)
- Overall titles: 0 – (17th in 2010)
- Discipline titles: 0 – (5th in SG, 2010)

Nadja Kamer (born 23 July 1986) is a World Cup alpine ski racer from Switzerland. From Schwyz, Kamer specializes in the speed events of Downhill and Super G and has made five World Cup podiums, all in downhill.

== World Cup results ==
=== Season standings ===
Season	Age	Overall	Slalom	Giant Slalom	Super G	Downhill	Combined
2008	21	94	—	—	33	—	—
2009	22	35	—	—	16	27	21
2010	23	17	—	—	17	5	25
2011	24	27	—	—	27	13	44
2012	25	52	—	—	43	15	—
2013	26	43	—	—	—	12	—
2014	27	55	—	—	41	25	—
2015	28	73	—	—	—	28	—

=== Race podiums ===
- 5 podiums – (5 DH)

Season	Date	Location	Discipline	Place
2010	9 Jan 2010	Haus im Ennstal, Austria	Downhill	2nd
2010	23 Jan 2010	Cortina d'Ampezzo, Italy	Downhill	3rd
2011	18 Dec 2010	Val-d'Isère, France	Downhill	2nd
2012	4 Feb 2012	Garmisch, Germany	Downhill	2nd
2013	14 Dec 2012	Val-d'Isère, France	Downhill	3rd

== World Championship results ==
Year	Age	Slalom	Giant Slalom	Super-G	Downhill	Combined
2011	24	—	—	13	14	—
2013	26	—	—	—	4	DNS2
2015	28	—	—	—	7	—

== Olympic results ==
Year	Age	Slalom	Giant Slalom	Super-G	Downhill	Combined
2010	23	—	—	DNF	19	DNF1
