= Mölgg =

Mölgg (sometimes spelled as Moelgg) is a surname. Notable people with the surname include:

- Manfred Mölgg (born 1982), Italian skier
- Manuela Mölgg (born 1983), Italian skier, sister of Manfred
