= Snow Queen Trophy =

International alpine skiing event in Croatia

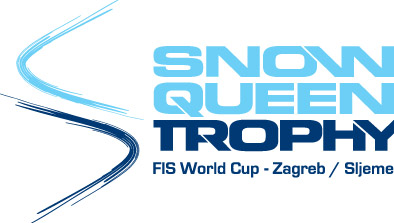
- Snow Queen Trophy official logo
- Interactive map of Snow Queen Trophy
- 45.905°N 15.942°E
- Location: Zagreb, Croatia
- Mountain: Medvednica (Sljeme)

Slalom
- Start: 978 m (3,209 ft) (AA)
- Finish: 768 m (2,520 ft)
- Vertical drop: 210 m (689 ft)

Location in Croatia

Snow Queen (Croatian: Snježna kraljica) is a World Cup alpine ski race held in the hills of Zagreb, Croatia. The men's and women's slalom races take place on the Medvednica mountaintop Sljeme, just north of Zagreb, usually in early January. The women's race debuted in 2005 and the men's event was added three years later in 2008. The events are held on the red run ski track (Crveni spust) on Medvednica, starting at an elevation of 985 m (3,232 ft) and ending at 785 m (2,575 ft). Besides the city events in Moscow and Munich, it is the only World Cup event held near a large metropolitan area.

Its current prize fund of €120,000 is one of the largest on the World Cup circuit, with a winner's share of €46,000. The race has been known to attract up to 25,000 spectators, making it one of the largest and the most visited races on the World Cup calendar. The trophy is a crystal crown with past winners' names imprinted on it. At the award ceremony, the winner is presented with a cloak and sits on a throne like a queen (king).

== History ==
The race was originally called "Golden Bear" (Croatian: Zlatni medvjed), but from the 2006 event the name was changed in honor of Janica Kostelić, whose victories in the sport helped popularise skiing in Croatia and also paved the way for the race to be included in the premier competition for alpine skiing. Croatian skiers never finished better than second in the event. In the women's race, Janica Kostelić finished third in 2006, while Ana Jelušić finished second the following year. In the men's race Ivica Kostelić has four podium finishes, three second places and one third place. The all-time leader at Zagreb in women's event is Mikaela Shiffrin, with five wins and seven podium finishes. Marcel Hirscher has won five races in the men's event.

In 2013, Mikaela Shiffrin became the youngest winner at the age of 17 years, 9 months, and 23 days. In 2014, the race was cancelled due to lack of snow. Shiffrin, reigning Olympic champion in slalom, defended her crown in 2015. The following year, both races were again cancelled due to lack of snow.

== Results ==
Podium finishers in the slalom races.

=== Men's race ===
Season	Race date	Winner	Second	Third
2008	17 February 2008	(Austria) Mario Matt	(Croatia) Ivica Kostelić	(Austria) Reinfried Herbst
2009	6 January 2009	(France) Jean-Baptiste Grange	(Croatia) Ivica Kostelić	(Italy) Giuliano Razzoli
2010	6 January 2010	(Italy) Giuliano Razzoli	(Italy) Manfred Mölgg	(France) Julien Lizeroux
2011	6 January 2011	(Sweden) André Myhrer	(Croatia) Ivica Kostelić	(Sweden) Mattias Hargin
2012	5 January 2012	(Austria) Marcel Hirscher	(Germany) Felix Neureuther	(Croatia) Ivica Kostelić
2013	6 January 2013	(Austria) Marcel Hirscher (2)	(Sweden) André Myhrer	(Austria) Mario Matt
2014	6 January 2014	Cancelled due to lack of snow		
2015	6 January 2015	(Austria) Marcel Hirscher (3)	(Germany) Felix Neureuther	(Norway) Sebastian Foss Solevåg
2016	6 January 2016	Cancelled due to lack of snow		
2017	5 January 2017	(Italy) Manfred Mölgg	(Germany) Felix Neureuther	(Norway) Henrik Kristoffersen
2018	4 January 2018	(Austria) Marcel Hirscher (4)	(Austria) Michael Matt	(Norway) Henrik Kristoffersen
2019	6 January 2019	(Austria) Marcel Hirscher (5)	(France) Alexis Pinturault	(Austria) Manuel Feller
2020	5 January 2020	(France) Clément Noël	(Switzerland) Ramon Zenhäusern	(Italy) Alex Vinatzer
2021	6 January 2021	(Germany) Linus Straßer	(Austria) Manuel Feller	(Austria) Marco Schwarz
2022	6 January 2022	Cancelled in first run due to bad weather conditions		
2023	Not included in schedule			
2024	Not included in schedule			
2025	Not included in schedule			
2026	Not included in schedule			

=== Women's race ===
Season	Race date	Winner	Second	Third
2005	20 January 2005	(Finland) Tanja Poutiainen	(United States) Kristina Koznick	(Austria) Marlies Schild
2006	5 January 2006	(Austria) Marlies Schild	(Austria) Kathrin Zettel	(Croatia) Janica Kostelić
2007	4 January 2007	(Austria) Marlies Schild (2)	(Croatia) Ana Jelušić	(Czech Republic) Šárka Záhrobská
2008	15 February 2008	(Finland) Tanja Poutiainen (2)	(Austria) Marlies Schild	(Slovakia) Veronika Zuzulová
2009	4 January 2009	(Germany) Maria Riesch	(Italy) Nicole Gius	(Czech Republic) Šárka Záhrobská
2010	3 January 2010	(France) Sandrine Aubert	(Austria) Kathrin Zettel	(Germany) Susanne Riesch
2011	4 January 2011	(Austria) Marlies Schild (3)	(Germany) Maria Riesch	(Italy) Manuela Mölgg
2012	3 January 2012	(Austria) Marlies Schild (4)	(Slovenia) Tina Maze	(Austria) Michaela Kirchgasser
2013	4 January 2013	(United States) Mikaela Shiffrin	(Sweden) Frida Hansdotter	(Canada) Erin Mielzynski
2014	4 January 2014	Cancelled due to lack of snow		
2015	4 January 2015	(United States) Mikaela Shiffrin (2)	(Austria) Kathrin Zettel	(Norway) Nina Løseth
2016	5 January 2016	Cancelled due to lack of snow		
2017	3 January 2017	(Slovakia) Veronika Velez-Zuzulová	(Slovakia) Petra Vlhová	(Czech Republic) Šárka Strachová
2018	3 January 2018	(United States) Mikaela Shiffrin (3)	(Switzerland) Wendy Holdener	(Sweden) Frida Hansdotter
2019	5 January 2019	(United States) Mikaela Shiffrin (4)	(Slovakia) Petra Vlhová	(Switzerland) Wendy Holdener
2020	4 January 2020	(Slovakia) Petra Vlhová	(United States) Mikaela Shiffrin	(Austria) Katharina Liensberger
2021	3 January 2021	(Slovakia) Petra Vlhová (2)	(Austria) Katharina Liensberger	(Switzerland) Michelle Gisin
2022	4 January 2022	(Slovakia) Petra Vlhová (3)	(United States) Mikaela Shiffrin	(Austria) Katharina Liensberger
2023	4 January 2023	(United States) Mikaela Shiffrin (5)	(Slovakia) Petra Vlhová	(Sweden) Anna Swenn-Larsson
2023	5 January 2023	Cancelled due to warm weather and wind		
2024	Not included in schedule			
2025	Not included in schedule			
2026	Not included in schedule			

== List of multiple podium finishers ==
Rank	Name	Country	Sex	Seasons	1st place, gold medalist(s)	2nd place, silver medalist(s)	3rd place, bronze medalist(s)	Total
1	Mikaela Shiffrin	United States	F	2012–	5	2	0	7
2	Marcel Hirscher	Austria	M	2008–2019	5	0	0	5
3	Marlies Schild	Austria	F	2002–2014	4	1	1	6
4	Petra Vlhová	Slovakia	F	2013–	3	3	0	6
5	Tanja Poutiainen	Finland	F	1998–2014	2	0	0	2
6	Maria Höfl-Riesch	Germany	F	2001–2014	1	1	0	2
6	Manfred Mölgg	Italy	M	2004–2022	1	1	0	2
6	André Myhrer	Sweden	M	2004–2020	1	1	0	2
9	Mario Matt	Austria	M	2000–2015	1	0	1	2
9	Giuliano Razzoli	Italy	M	2007–	1	0	1	2
9	Veronika Velez-Zuzulová	Slovakia	F	2002–2018	1	0	1	2
12	Ivica Kostelić	Croatia	M	2001–2017	0	3	1	4
13	Felix Neureuther	Germany	M	2004–2019	0	3	0	3
13	Kathrin Zettel	Austria	F	2005–2015	0	3	0	3
15	Katharina Liensberger	Austria	F	2016–	0	1	2	3
16	Manuel Feller	Austria	M	2013–	0	1	1	2
16	Frida Hansdotter	Sweden	F	2007–2019	0	1	1	2
16	Wendy Holdener	Switzerland	F	2011–	0	1	1	2
19	Šárka Strachová	Czech Republic	F	2003–2017	0	0	3	3
20	Henrik Kristoffersen	Norway	M	2013–	0	0	2	2
