= Anna Goodman (skier) =

Canadian alpine skier (born 1986)

Personal information
- Born: 23 January 1986 (age 40) Montreal, Quebec, Canada

Sport
- Sport: Skiing
- Club: Mont-Tremblant Ski Club
- Updated on 18 February 2010

Anna Goodman (born 23 January 1986) is a Canadian alpine skier.

== Career ==
Goodman competed on the FIS World Cup tour from 2004 to 2013. She competed in the slalom at the 2010 Winter Olympics on home snow in Canada, despite her suffering an anterior cruciate ligament injury at the Snow Queen Trophy race in Zagreb, Croatia shortly before the Games: she finished the Olympic slalom in 19th.
