= Julien Lizeroux =

French alpine skier (born 1979)

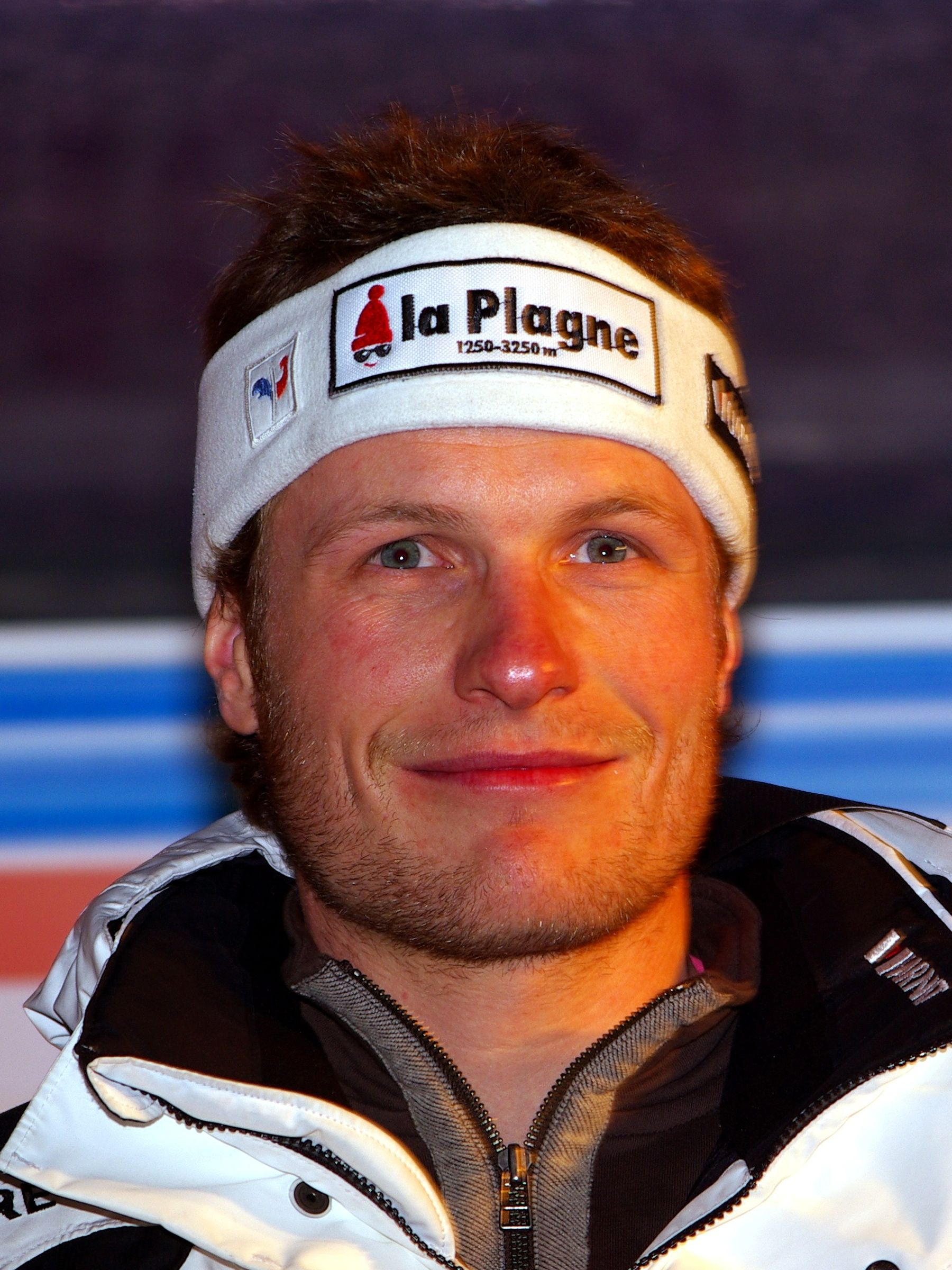
- Lizeroux in January 2008

Personal information
- Born: 5 September 1979 (age 46) Moûtiers, Savoie, France
- Height: 1.73 m (5 ft 8 in)
- Website: lizeroux.com

Skiing career
- Sport: Alpine skiing
- Club: Douanes-La Plagne
- Retired: 26 January 2021 (age 41)
- Disciplines: Slalom
- World Cup debut: 23 January 2000 (age 20)

Olympics
- Teams: 3 – (2010, 2014, 2018)
- Medals: 0

World Championships
- Teams: 6 – (2001, '07, '09, '15, '17, '19)
- Medals: 3 (1 gold)

World Cup
- Seasons: 19 - (2000–05, 2007–11, 2014–21)
- Wins: 3 - (3 SL)
- Podiums: 9 - (7 SL, 1 SC, 1 CE)
- Overall titles: 0 - (9th – 2010)
- Discipline titles: 0 - (2nd in SL, 2010)
Medal record
World Championships
Gold medal – first place	2017 St. Moritz	Team event
Silver medal – second place	2009 Val d'Isère	Super combined
Silver medal – second place	2009 Val d'Isère	Slalom

Julien Lizeroux (born 5 September 1979 in Moûtiers) is a retired French World Cup alpine ski racer. He competed mainly in slalom, but also in giant slalom and combined.

Born in Moûtiers, Savoie, Lizeroux is a member of Douanes-La Plagne. He made his World Cup debut in 2000 and has three World Cup victories, all in slalom. Lizeroux won silver medals in the super combined and the slalom on home snow at the 2009 World Championships in Val d'Isère. He finished 9th in the slalom and 18th in the super combined of the 2010 Winter Olympics in Vancouver.

A problematic right knee hampered his performance during the first half of 2011 season, and has sidelined him since January 2011. Surgery in June 2011 caused Lizeroux to miss the 2012 season.

He returned for the 2014 season, without much success. The following three seasons (2015–2017) were more successful, with several (one, five and five, respectively) finishes in the top ten. In 2015 he got into world news for a mistake in a slalom race. In 2017 he became world champion in team event (as a reserve). Lizeroux retired from professional skiing in January 2021.

He is in a relationship with alpine skier Tessa Worley.

== World Cup results ==
=== Season standings ===
Season	Age	Overall	Slalom	Giant Slalom	Super G	Downhill	Combined
2000	20	unranked	0 points				
2001	21	78	28	—	—	—	–
2002	22	unranked	0 points				
2003	23	unranked	0 points				
2004	24	unranked	0 points				
2005	25	unranked	0 points				
2006	26	did not compete					
2007	27	74	24	—	—	—	—
2008	28	17	6	60	—	—	11
2009	29	13	3	53	—	—	7
2010	30	9	2	38	—	—	10
2011	31	58	30	—	—	—	—
2012	32	injured					
2013	33	injured					
2014	34	96	36	—	—	—	—
2015	35	48	15	—	—	—	—
2016	36	35	9	—	—	—	—
2017	37	38	13	—	—	—	—
2018	38	59	24	—	—	—	—
2019	39	69	24	—	—	—	—
2020	40	105	37	—	—	—	—
2021	41	unranked	0 points				

=== Race podiums ===
- 3 wins – (3 SL)
- 9 podiums – (7 SL, 1 SC, 1 CE(PS))

Season	Date	Location	Discipline	Place
2009	25 Jan 2009	Kitzbühel, Austria	Slalom	1st
2009	22 Feb 2009	Sestriere, Italy	Super combined	2nd
2009	1 Mar 2009	Kranjska Gora, Slovenia	Slalom	1st
2009	14 Mar 2009	Åre, Sweden	Slalom	2nd
2010	6 Jan 2009	Zagreb-Sljeme, Croatia	Slalom	3rd
2010	10 Jan 2010	Adelboden, Switzerland	Slalom	1st
2010	24 Jan 2010	Kitzbühel, Austria	Slalom	2nd
2010	31 Jan 2010	Kranjska Gora, Slovenia	Slalom	3rd
2011	2 Jan 2011	Munich, Germany	Parallel slalom	2nd

== Olympic results ==
Year	Age	Slalom	Combined
2010	30	9	18
2014	34	15	–

== World Championships results ==
Year	Age	Slalom	Combined
2001	21	25	
2007	27	14	
2009	29	2	2
2015	35	22	
2017	37	DNF	
2019	39	DSQ	
