= Šárka Strachová =

Czech alpine skier (born 1985)

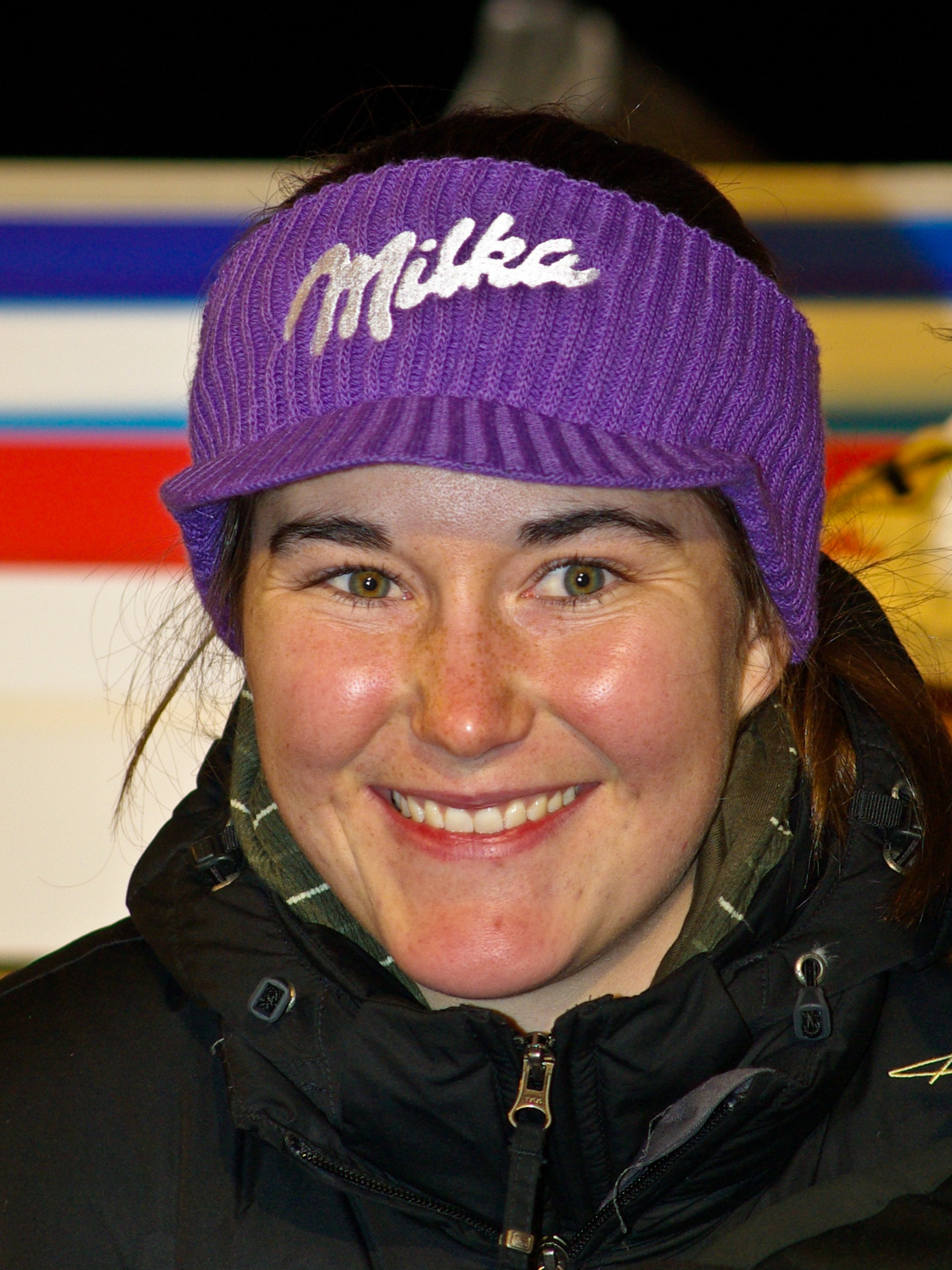
- Strachová in December 2008

Personal information
- Born: 11 February 1985 (age 41) Benecko, Czechoslovakia
- Height: 175 cm (5 ft 9 in)
- Website: sarkastrachova.com

Skiing career
- Sport: Alpine skiing
- Club: Ski Team Krkonoš
- Retired: 28 March 2017 (age 32)
- Disciplines: Slalom
- World Cup debut: 15 December 2002 (age 17)

Olympics
- Teams: 3 – (2006, 2010, 2014)
- Medals: 1 (0 gold)

World Championships
- Teams: 9 – (2001–17)
- Medals: 4 (1 gold)

World Cup
- Seasons: 15 – (2003–2017)
- Wins: 2 – (2 SL)
- Podiums: 17 – (17 SL)
- Overall titles: 0 – (9th in 2007)
- Discipline titles: 0 – (2nd in SL, 2009)
Medal record
Women's alpine skiing
Representing the Czech Republic
International alpine ski competitions
Event	1st	2nd	3rd
Olympic Games	0	0	1
World Championships	1	1	2
Total	1	1	3
Olympic Games
Bronze medal – third place	2010 Vancouver	Slalom
World Championships
Gold medal – first place	2007 Åre	Slalom
Silver medal – second place	2009 Val-d'Isère	Slalom
Bronze medal – third place	2005 Bormio	Slalom
Bronze medal – third place	2015 Beaver Creek	Slalom
Junior World Championships
Gold medal – first place	2005 Bardonecchia	Slalom
Bronze medal – third place	2004 Maribor	Slalom
Bronze medal – third place	2004 Maribor	Combined

Šárka Strachová (Czech pronunciation: [ˈʃaːrka ˈstraxovaː], née Záhrobská [ˈzaːɦropskaː]; born on 11 February 1985) is a Czech retired alpine ski racer. She specialised in the slalom event. Strachová is the first alpine racer representing the Czech Republic to medal at the Winter Olympics and at the World Championships and just the second Czech alpine skier ever to medal in the Olympics.

== Ski racing career ==
Záhrobská won the gold medal in slalom at the 2007 World Championships and narrowly missed a bronze in the super combined, finishing in 4th place by 0.20 seconds. Two years earlier, she won her first medal at the 2005 World Championships, taking the bronze in slalom while placing fifth in the combined. It was the first World Championships medal for a Czech alpine skier. In the 2006 Winter Olympics, Strachová finished 13th in slalom, 19th in the combined, and 27th in super-G; she did not finish the second run of the giant slalom.

On the World Cup circuit, Záhrobská made her debut in December 2002 at age 17 and finished 5th in her first race, a parallel slalom (an experimental format using a series of elimination races) in Sestriere, Italy. She ended the 2004 and 2006 seasons ranked in the top 10 in slalom, and broke into the top 30 in the overall ranking in 2006. She reached her first World Cup podium in January 2007, with a third place in the slalom on at Zagreb, Croatia, and followed it up with a 2nd place in the slalom three days later at Kranjska Gora, Slovenia. This ended a 21-year-long drought for Czech alpine skiers on the World Cup podium, since Olga Charvátová took 2nd place in Bromont, Quebec, on 22 March 1986. She won her first World Cup race in November 2008 in Aspen, Colorado, and reached the podium two additional times in the 2009 season to finish as the runner-up in the season slalom standings. She won again at Aspen in November 2009.

At the 2010 Winter Olympics in Vancouver, Strachová took the bronze medal in the slalom at Whistler. This made her the first Czech to ever medal in alpine skiing for the Czech Republic and just the second Czech ever, once again joining Olga Charvátová, who won a bronze in the 1984 Winter Olympics while competing for Czechoslovakia.

Strachová has also won numerous medals at the National Alpine Skiing Championships of the Czech Republic and other nations. She has been the National Champion (i.e. gold medalist) at the Czech (2002: slalom; 2003: slalom, giant slalom and super-G; 2004: slalom, giant slalom; 2005: slalom, giant slalom; 2006: super-G), Slovenian (2006: giant slalom), and Croatian (2006: giant slalom) national championships. Her giant slalom victory at the 2006 Croatian championships was by a narrow 0.15 second margin over Janica Kostelić, who had just beaten Strachová for the super-G title the previous day and was coming off one of the most dominant seasons in World Cup skiing history.

Šárka Strachová and her brother Petr Záhrobský are the only skiers of the Ski Team Krkonoš. Their personal coach is their father Petr Záhrobský. The team has not had good relationships with the Czech Ski Association. The coach protested, especially after the association officials approved the rule that Czech skiers have to prefer their home competitions to the foreign ones, and refused to follow it, stating that Strachová needs better rivals to remain a premier international skier. Šárka Strachová also does not prepare with the rest of the Czech national team because her father believes it would disadvantage her career.

Both Šárka Strachová and her brother Petr race on Fischer skis.

On 28 March 2017 Strachová announced her retirement from professional skiing aged 32.

== Personal life ==
In 2013, she married her long-time boyfriend, Antonín Strach and became Šárka Strachová. On 14 November 2017 Strachová announced her pregnancy.

== World Cup results ==
=== Season standings ===
Season	Age	Overall	Slalom	Giant slalom	Super-G	Downhill	Combined
2003	18	53	19	—	—	—	10
2004	19	32	10	60	—	—	—
2005	20	42	11	—	—	—	17
2006	21	30	10	42	—	—	24
2007	22	9	3	20	45	—	6
2008	23	16	5	21	29	—	31
2009	24	12	2	37	37	—	11
2010	25	18	5	43	—	—	27
2011	26	36	10	—	—	—	—
2012	27	70	25	—	—	—	—
2013	28	53	20	—	—	—	—
2014	29	36	13	—	—	—	9
2015	30	17	4	—	—	—	—
2016	31	20	5	—	—	—	—
2017	32	21	6	—	—	—	—

=== Race podiums ===
- 2 wins – (2 SL)
- 17 podiums – (17 SL)

Season	Date	Location	Discipline	Place
2007	4 Jan 2007	Zagreb, Croatia	Slalom	3rd
2007	7 Jan 2007	Kranjska Gora, Slovenia	Slalom	2nd
2007	11 Mar 2007	Zwiesel, Germany	Slalom	2nd
2008	25 Nov 2007	Panorama, Canada	Slalom	2nd
2008	14 Mar 2008	Bormio, Italy	Slalom	3rd
2009	30 Nov 2008	(United States) Aspen, USA	Slalom	1st
2009	4 Jan 2009	Zagreb, Croatia	Slalom	3rd
2009	13 Mar 2009	Åre, Sweden	Slalom	3rd
2010	29 Nov 2009	(United States) Aspen, USA	Slalom	1st
2015	29 Dec 2014	Kühtai, Austria	Slalom	2nd
2015	22 Feb 2015	Maribor, Slovenia	Slalom	3rd
2015	14 Mar 2015	Åre, Sweden	Slalom	3rd
2016	29 Nov 2015	(United States) Aspen, USA	Slalom	3rd
2016	5 Jan 2016	Santa Caterina, Italy	Slalom	2nd
2016	12 Jan 2016	Flachau, Austria	Slalom	2nd
2017	3 Jan 2017	Zagreb, Croatia	Slalom	3rd
2017	11 Mar 2017	(United States) Squaw Valley, USA	Slalom	2nd

== World Championship results ==
Year	Age	Slalom	Giant slalom	Super-G	Downhill	Combined
2001	16	21	—	—	—	—
2003	18	DNF2	—	—	—	9
2005	20	3	10	—	—	5
2007	22	1	12	—	—	4
2009	24	2	16	15	—	11
2011	26	12	—	—	—	—
2013	28	8	37	—	—	—
2015	30	3	—	—	—	—
2017	32	5	—	—	—	—

== Olympic results ==
Year	Age	Slalom	Giant slalom	Super-G	Downhill	Combined
2006	21	13	DNF2	27	—	19
2010	25	3	DNS2	—	27	7
2014	29	10	DNF1	—	—	9

Olympic Games
Preceded by Jaromír Jágr	Flagbearer for Czech Republic; Sochi 2014	Succeeded by Eva Samková
Awards
Preceded by Lenka Hyková	Czech Junior Athlete of the Year; 2005	Succeeded by Martina Sáblíková
