= Kathrin Zettel =

Austrian alpine skier

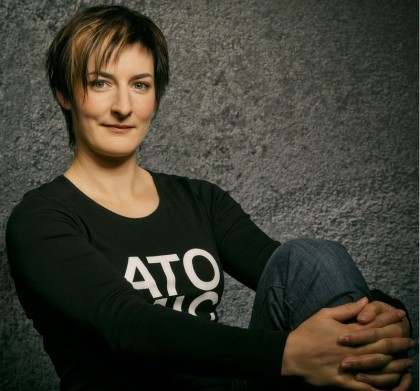
- Zettel in January 2009

Personal information
- Born: 5 August 1986 (age 39) Scheibbs, Lower Austria, Austria
- Height: 167 cm (5 ft 6 in)
- Website: kathrin-zettel.at

Skiing career
- Sport: Alpine skiing
- Club: Schiclub Göstling-Hochkar
- Retired: 13 July 2015 (age 28)
- Disciplines: Giant slalom, slalom, super-G, combined
- World Cup debut: 13 March 2004 (age 17)

Olympics
- Teams: 3 – (2006, 2010, 2014)
- Medals: 1 (0 gold)

World Championships
- Teams: 6 – (2005–15)
- Medals: 2 (1 gold)

World Cup
- Seasons: 11 – (2005–15)
- Wins: 9 – (7 GS, 2 SL)
- Podiums: 50 – (21 GS, 24 SL, 5 SC)
- Overall titles: 0 – (4th in 2009)
- Discipline titles: 0 – (2nd: SL, GS, 2010; 2nd SL, 2009)
Medal record
Women's alpine skiing
Representing Austria
Olympic Games
Bronze medal – third place	2014 Sochi	Slalom
World Championships
Gold medal – first place	2009 Val d'Isère	Super combined
Silver medal – second place	2005 Bormio	Team Event
Silver medal – second place	2011 Garmisch	Slalom
Junior World Ski Championships
Gold medal – first place	2004 Maribor	Slalom
Gold medal – first place	2005 Bardonecchia	Combined
Silver medal – second place	2004 Maribor	Combined
Silver medal – second place	2005 Bardonecchia	Slalom

Kathrin Zettel (born 5 August 1986) is an Austrian retired World Cup alpine ski racer. She won many races and took a bronze medal in the 2014 Winter Olympics in Sochi. In 2021 she was a partner in a company creating domestic size wind turbines in lower Austria.

== Life ==
Zettel was born in 1986 in Scheibbs, Lower Austria, and from Göstling, she competed primarily in the technical events of Giant slalom and slalom. Zettel made her World Cup debut in March 2004 and won her first World Cup race in November 2006.

In January 2010, Zettel won both technical events at Maribor, for her first victory in slalom. At the 2014 Winter Olympics in Sochi, she was the bronze medalist in slalom at Rosa Khutor, her first podium since October and just two days after her grandmother died.

After she retired in 2015 she went to live in Styria. She took a share in "Blue Power" a wind turbine company. The turbines are small (1.7 m diameter) and designed to be used by a home owner. Zettel handles the social media for the company.

== World Cup results ==
=== Season standings ===
Season	Age	Overall	Slalom	Giant Slalom	Super G	Downhill	Combined
2005	18	36	23	18	—	—	—
2006	19	7	4	6	30	—	6
2007	20	11	8	7	31	49	11
2008	21	13	9	6	23	—	11
2009	22	4	6	2	23	—	3
2010	23	5	2	2	37	—	14
2011	24	13	6	10	—	—	—
2012	25	12	5	19	44	—	5
2013	26	7	8	5	—	—	8
2014	27	14	11	5	—	—	—
2015	28	7	5	8	—	—	3

=== Race victories ===
- 9 wins – (7 GS, 2 SL)
- 50 podiums (21 GS, 24 SL, 5 SC)

Season	Date	Location	Discipline
2007	25 Nov 2006	Aspen, USA	Giant slalom
2007	28 Dec 2006	Semmering, Austria	Giant slalom
2009	25 Oct 2008	Sölden, Austria	Giant slalom
2009	28 Dec 2008	Semmering, Austria	Giant slalom
2009	25 Jan 2009	Cortina d'Ampezzo, Italy	Giant slalom
2009	6 Mar 2009	Ofterschwang, Germany	Giant slalom
2010	16 Jan 2010	Maribor, Slovenia	Giant slalom
2010	17 Jan 2010	Maribor, Slovenia	Slalom
2013	25 Nov 2012	Aspen, USA	Slalom

== World championships ==
Year	Age	Slalom	Giant slalom	Super-G	Downhill	Combined
2005	18	4	—	—	—	6
2007	20	5	9	—	—	5
2009	22	DNF1	6	—	—	1
2011	24	2	12	—	—	—
2013	26	10	4	—	—	—
2015	28	5	7	—	—	6

== Winter Olympics ==
Year	Age	Slalom	Giant slalom	Super-G	Downhill	Combined
2006	19	DSQ1	7	—	—	4
2010	23	13	5	—	—	4
2014	27	3	19	—	—	13
