= Tanja Poutiainen =

Finnish alpine skier

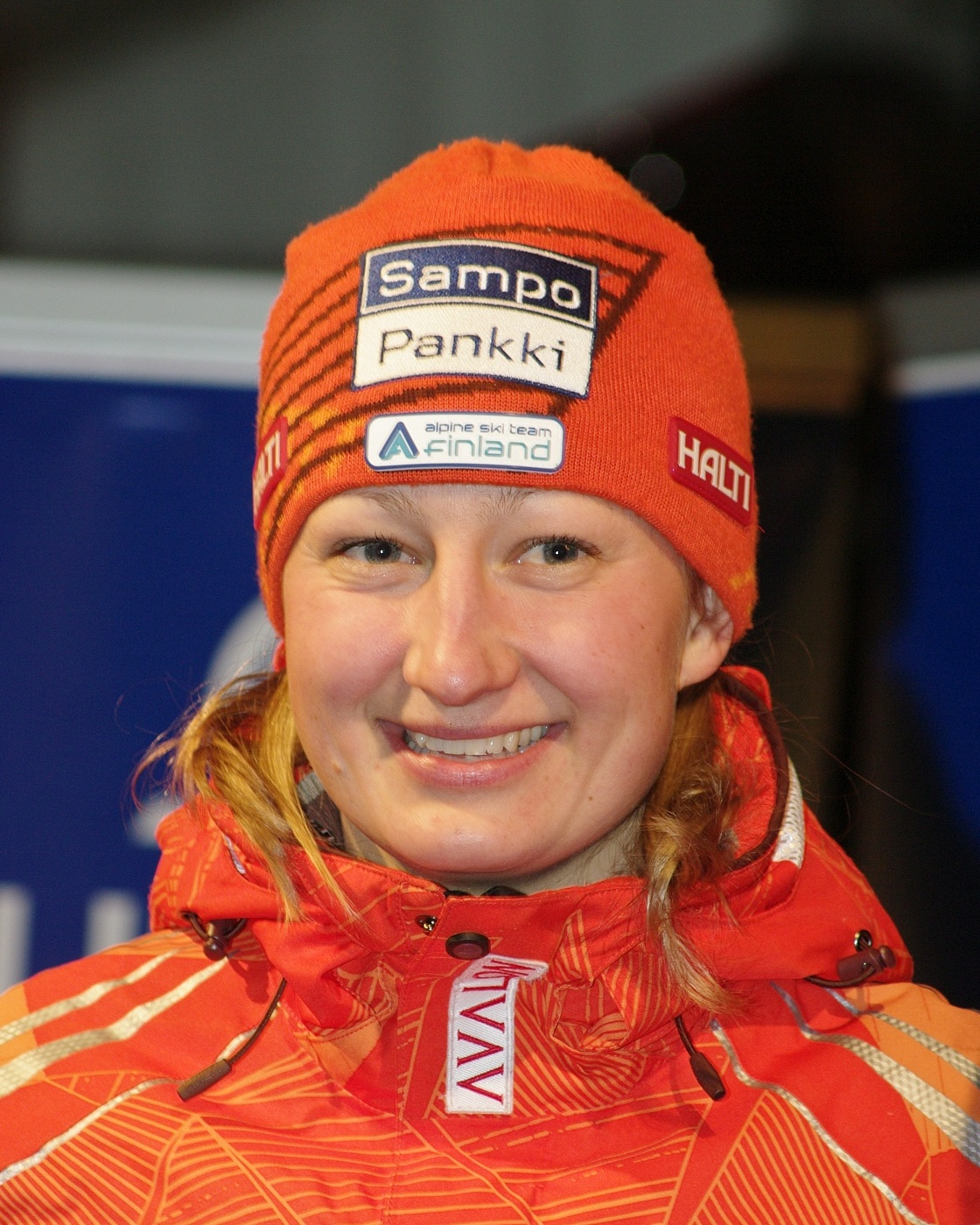
- Poutiainen in 2010

Personal information
- Full name: Tanja Tuulia Poutiainen
- Born: 6 April 1980 (age 46) Rovaniemi, Lapland, Finland
- Height: 1.70 m (5 ft 7 in)
- Website: tanjapoutiainen.com

Skiing career
- Sport: Alpine skiing
- Club: Santa Claus Ski Team
- Retired: 16 March 2014 (age 33)
- Disciplines: Giant slalom, slalom
- World Cup debut: 16 March 1997 (age 16)

Olympics
- Teams: 5 – (1998–2014)
- Medals: 1 (0 gold)

World Championships
- Teams: 9 – (1997–2013)
- Medals: 4 (0 gold)

World Cup
- Seasons: 16 – (1998–99, 2001–14)
- Wins: 11 – (6 SL, 5 GS)
- Podiums: 48 – (28 SL, 20 GS)
- Overall titles: 0 – (5th in 2005, 2009)
- Discipline titles: 3 – (2 GS, 1 SL)
Medal record
Women's alpine skiing
Representing Finland
International alpine ski competitions
Event	1st	2nd	3rd
Olympic Games	0	1	0
World Championships	0	2	2
Total	0	3	2
Olympic Games
Silver medal – second place	2006 Torino	Giant slalom
World Championships
Silver medal – second place	2005 Bormio	Giant slalom
Silver medal – second place	2005 Bormio	Slalom
Bronze medal – third place	2009 Val d'Isère	Giant slalom
Bronze medal – third place	2009 Val d'Isere	Slalom
Junior World Ski Championships
Gold medal – first place	1997 Schladming	Slalom
Bronze medal – third place	1997 Schladming	Super-G
Bronze medal – third place	1999 Pra-Loup	Giant slalom

Tanja Tuulia Poutiainen (born 6 April 1980) is a retired World Cup alpine ski racer from Finland. She specialized in the technical events of slalom and giant slalom, and was the silver medalist in the women's giant slalom at the 2006 Winter Olympics in Torino.

Born in Rovaniemi, Lapland, Poutiainen started skiing at the age of three. She became junior world champion in slalom in 1997 at Schladming, Austria, and also took bronze in the super-G; she made her World Cup debut that March at Vail in the United States. At the 1999 Junior World Championships, she placed third in the giant slalom at Pra-Loup, France.

Poutiainen scored her first World Cup victory – and the first for a female Finnish alpine skier – on 28 February 2004 in a slalom held on home snow in Levi, Finland – the first alpine World Cup race to be held in the country. In the 2005 World Cup season, Poutiainen won the season titles in both the slalom and giant slalom, and placed fifth in the overall standings. Along the way she won three slaloms, a giant slalom and secured ten podium finishes. At the 2005 World Championships, she placed second in the giant slalom behind Anja Pärson of Sweden and second in the slalom behind Janica Kostelić of Croatia – the first alpine World Championship medals for a Finnish female.

The 2009 season saw Poutianen take another World Cup discipline title, in giant slalom, as well as bronzes in slalom and giant slalom at the World Championships in Val d'Isère.

Poutiainen was notable for her consistency, and between January 2007 and March 2011 she successfully completed every World Cup race she entered – a total of 67.

At the end of the 2014 season, Poutiainen had 11 World Cup victories, 48 podiums, and three World Cup discipline titles. She was trained by Michael Bont and lives in St. Gallen, Switzerland. She announced her retirement in March 2014.

== World Cup results ==
=== Season titles ===
Season	Discipline
2005	Giant slalom
2005	Slalom
2009	Giant slalom

=== Season standings ===
Season	Age	Overall	Slalom	Giant slalom	Super-G	Downhill	Combined
1998	17	73	50	28	—	—	—
1999	18	95	—	41	—	—	—
2000	19						
2001	20	20	12	12	—	—	—
2002	21	12	7	10	—	—	—
2003	22	11	3	14	—	—	—
2004	23	9	4	5	—	—	—
2005	24	5	1	1	48	—	—
2006	25	12	5	8	—	—	26
2007	26	7	6	2	—	—	22
2008	27	8	4	4	—	—	—
2009	28	5	4	1	—	—	—
2010	29	11	9	5	—	—	—
2011	30	7	2	3	—	—	—
2012	31	13	6	13	—	—	—
2013	32	13	5	22	—	—	—
2014	33	54	26	23	—	—	—

=== Race victories ===
11 wins – (5 giant slalom, 6 slalom)

Season	Date	Location	Discipline
2004	24 Feb 2004	Levi, Finland	Slalom
2005	26 Nov 2004	(United States) Aspen, USA	Giant slalom
2005	28 Nov 2004	(United States) Aspen, USA	Slalom
2005	21 Dec 2004	Altenmarkt, Austria	Slalom
2005	20 Jan 2005	Zagreb, Croatia	Slalom
2007	10 Mar 2007	Zwiesel, Germany	Giant slalom
2008	15 Feb 2008	Zagreb, Croatia	Slalom
2009	13 Dec 2008	La Molina, Spain	Giant slalom
2010	24 Oct 2009	Sölden, Austria	Giant slalom
2010	24 Jan 2010	Cortina d'Ampezzo, Italy	Giant slalom
2011	11 Jan 2011	Flachau, Austria	Slalom

== World Championship results ==
Year	Age	Slalom	Giant slalom	Super-G	Downhill	Combined
1997	16	17	DNF2	—	—	—
1999	18	24	14	—	—	—
2001	20	DNF2	13	—	—	—
2003	22	10	23	—	—	—
2005	24	2	2	—	—	—
2007	26	14	14	—	—	—
2009	28	3	3	—	—	—
2011	30	6	13	—	—	—
2013	32	4	15	—	—	—

== Olympic results ==
Year	Age	Slalom	Giant slalom	Super-G	Downhill	Combined
1998	17	18	26	—	—	—
2002	21	DNF2	11	—	—	—
2006	25	6	2	—	—	—
2010	29	6	13	—	—	—
2014	33	12	14	—	—	—
