= Manuela Mölgg =

Italian alpine skier

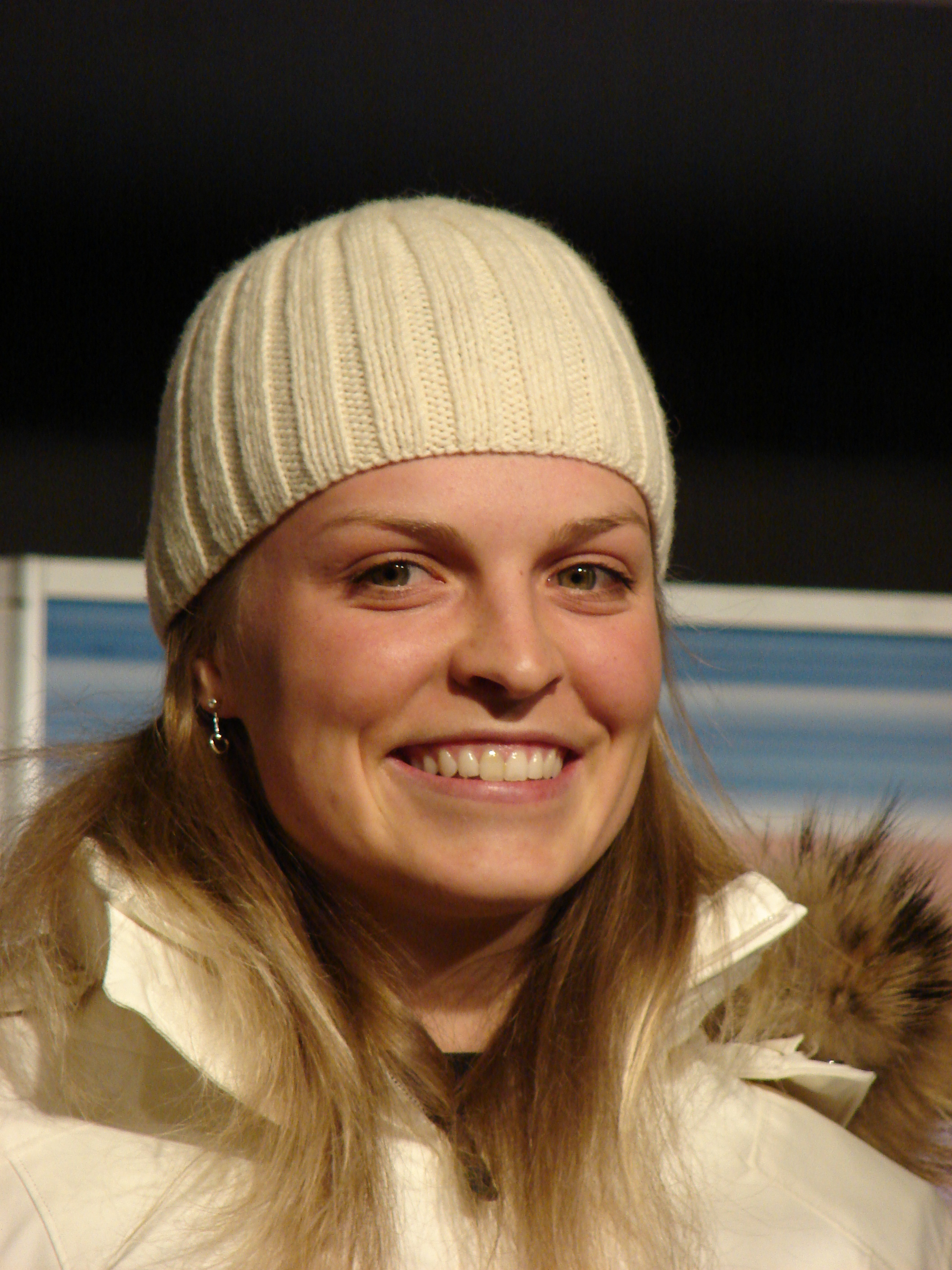
- Mölgg during World Cup competitions in Semmering, Austria in December 2006

Personal information
- Born: 28 August 1983 (age 42) Bruneck, South Tyrol, Italy
- Height: 169 cm (5 ft 7 in)
- Website: moelgg.com

Skiing career
- Sport: Alpine skiing
- Club: G.S. Fiamme Gialle
- Retired: 18 March 2018 (age 34)
- Disciplines: Giant slalom, slalom
- World Cup debut: 20 December 2000 (age 17)

Olympics
- Teams: 3 (2006, 2010, 2018)
- Medals: 0

World Championships
- Teams: 7 (2003, '07–17)
- Medals: 0

World Cup
- Seasons: 16 (2003–2018)
- Wins: 0
- Podiums: 14 (12 GS, 2 SL)
- Overall titles: 0 (15th in 2009)
- Discipline titles: 0 (3rd in GS: 2008 )
Medal record
Women's alpine skiing
Representing Italy
World Cup race podiums
Event	1st	2nd	3rd
Slalom	0	1	1
Giant	0	5	7
Total	0	6	8

Manuela Mölgg (born 28 August 1983) is a retired alpine ski racer from Italy, a specialist in the technical events of slalom and giant slalom.

== Biography ==
Born in Bruneck, South Tyrol, Mölgg made her World Cup debut at age 17 in December 2000 and gained her first podium in November 2004. She has 14 World Cup podium finishes and appeared in two Olympics and six World Championships. At the 2009 Alpine World Ski Championships in Val-d'Isère Mölgg took the lead in the slalom after the first run but was disqualified from the second after missing the final gate of the course, having kept her lead at the intermediate checkpoints before the finish line. She is the sister of Manfred Mölgg (b.1982), a racer on the Italian men's team.

At the 2018 Winter Olympics of Pyeongchang she led after the first run of the giant slalom, and then finished the race in 8th position.

After the 2018 World Cup Finals in Åre, Mölgg announced her retirement from World Cup skiing.

Mölgg has been in a relationship with fellow alpine skier Werner Heel since 2009: as of 2018 the couple were engaged.

== World Cup results ==
=== Season standings ===
Season	Age	Overall	Slalom	Giant slalom	Super G	Downhill	Combined
2003	19	57	33	34	54	—	11
2004	20	59	40	22	—	—	—
2005	21	35	17	26	—	—	—
2006	22	39	26	19	—	—	28
2007	23	23	19	8	—	—	—
2008	24	18	21	3	—	—	—
2009	25	15	15	5	—	—	—
2010	26	22	15	7	—	—	—
2011	27	22	9	14	—	—	—
2012	28	29	13	22	—	—	—
2013	29	72	40	35	—	—	—
2014	30	46	41	18	—	—	—
2015	31	39	25	17	—	—	—
2016	32	40	26	15	—	—	—
2017	33	30	27	9	—	—	—
2018	34	32	36	7	—	—	—

=== Race podiums ===
- 14 podiums (12 GS, 2 SL)

Season	Date	Location	Discipline	Place
2005	28 Nov 2004	(United States) Aspen, USA	Slalom	2nd
2008	24 Nov 2007	Panorama, Canada	Giant slalom	3rd
2008	12 Jan 2008	Maribor, Slovenia	Giant slalom	2nd
2008	15 Mar 2008	Bormio, Italy	Giant slalom	2nd
2009	13 Dec 2008	La Molina, Spain	Giant slalom	2nd
2009	28 Dec 2008	Semmering, Austria	Giant slalom	2nd
2009	14 Mar 2009	Åre, Sweden	Giant slalom	3rd
2010	29 Dec 2009	Lienz, Austria	Giant slalom	2nd
2011	23 Oct 2010	Sölden, Austria	Giant slalom	3rd
2011	4 Jan 2011	Zagreb, Croatia	Slalom	3rd
2017	27 Dec 2016	Semmering, Austria	Giant slalom	3rd
2018	28 Oct 2017	Sölden, Austria	Giant slalom	3rd
2018	25 Nov 2017	(United States) Killington, USA	Giant slalom	3rd
2018	19 Dec 2017	Courchevel, France	Giant slalom	3rd

== World Championship results ==
She has competed in seven World Championships and her best finish is sixth place, in the slalom and giant slalom in 2011, and again in the GS in 2017.

Year	Age	Slalom	Giant slalom	Super-G	Downhill	Combined
2005	19	15	7	—	—	—
2005	21	—	—	—	—	—
2007	23	20	11	—	—	—
2009	25	DSQ2	DNF1	—	—	—
2011	27	6	6	—	—	—
2013	29	25	11	—	—	—
2015	31	DNF2	20	—	—	—
2017	33	DNF1	6	—	—	—

== Olympic results ==
Mölgg has made four Olympic teams and her best finish was eight in the giant slalom in 2018.

Year	Age	Slalom	Giant slalom	Super-G	Downhill	Combined
2006	22	19	DNF1	—	—	—
2010	26	11	17	—	—	—
2014	30	—	—	—	—	—
2018	34	23	8	—	—	—

== See also ==
- Italian skiers most World Cup podiums
