= Sofija Novoselić =

Croatian alpine skier (born 1990)

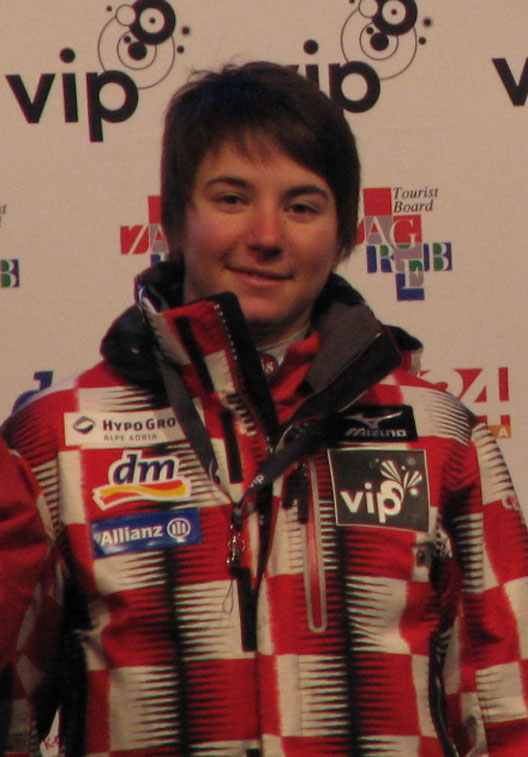
Sofija Novoselić

Sofija Novoselić (born January 18, 1990) is a Croatian alpine skier, member of the Croatian Alpine Ski Team. Her strongest discipline is slalom.

Novoselić was born in Zagreb, at the time in SR Croatia, SFR Yugoslavia. She debuted in Zagreb in 2006. Her best result so far in a FIS race was 10th place in slalom. In FIS Alpine World Ski Championships 2007 she won 27th place in slalom.
