= Sandrine Aubert =

French alpine skier and slalom specialist

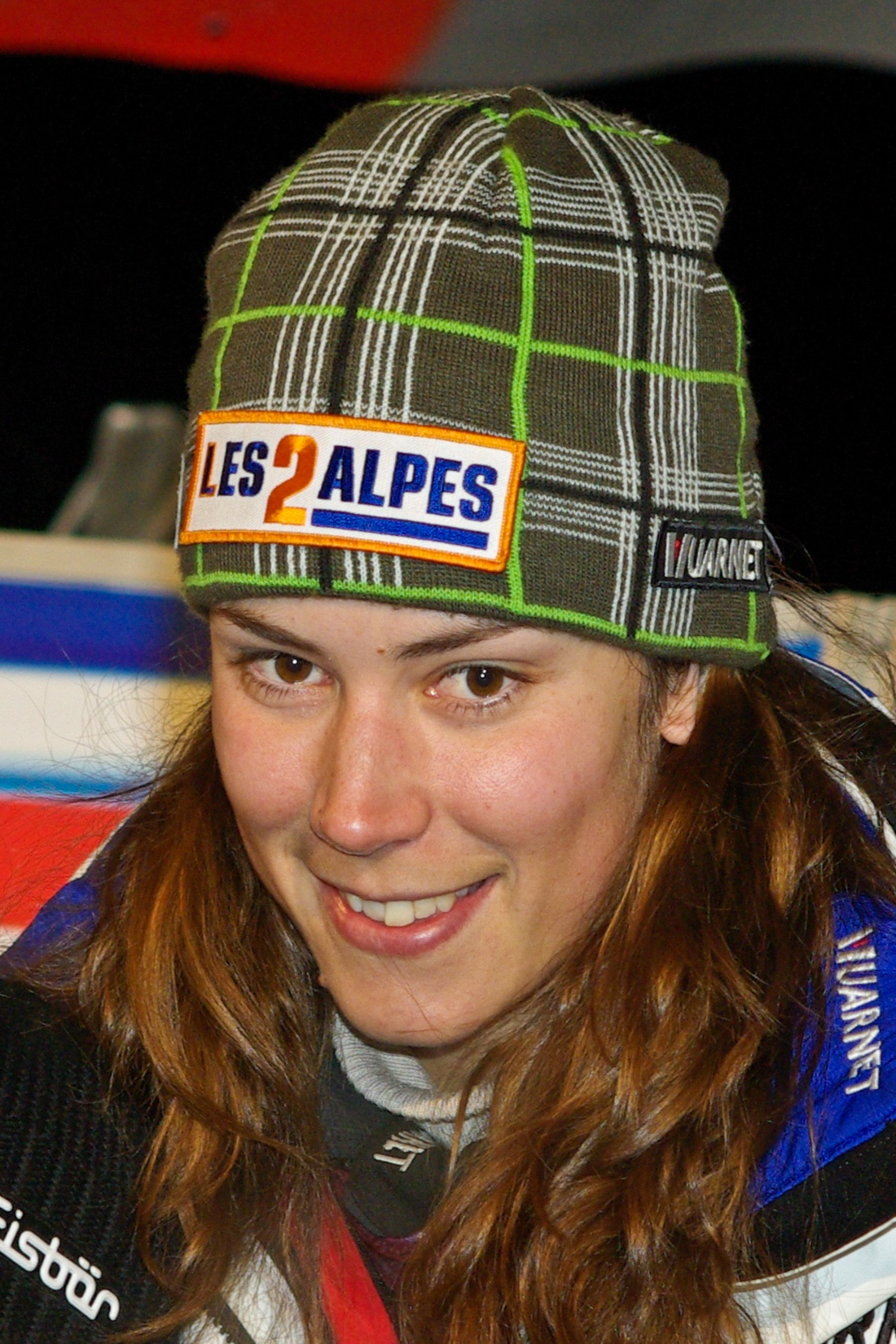
Sandrine Aubert, Semmering 2008

Sandrine Aubert (born 6 October 1982 in Échirolles, Isère) is a retired French alpine skier and a slalom specialist. After she was not selected for the French squad for the 2014 Winter Olympics, she announced her retirement from competition in February 2014.

== 2009 Season ==
Aubert won her first World Cup race in women's slalom in Ofterschwang, Germany on 7 March 2009. The following week she won a consecutive second World Cup slalom race in Åre, Sweden.

== 2010 Season ==
Aubert won again in Åre the third World Cup slalom race of the season. She won her second World Cup race of the season in Zagreb and for the first time moved at the top of the slalom standings. She finished 5th in the slalom event of the 2010 Winter Olympics in Vancouver, achieving the best result in alpine skiing at these games for an otherwise disappointing French team. Overall, she ranked fourth of the slalom standings of the 2010 World Cup.

== World Cup victories ==
Date	Location	Race
7 March 2009	(Germany) Ofterschwang	Slalom
13 March 2009	(Sweden) Åre	Slalom
13 December 2009	(Sweden) Åre	Slalom
3 January 2010	(Croatia) Zagreb	Slalom
