= Iva Mišak =

Croatian alpine skier (born 1993)

Iva Mišak (born March 16, 1993) is a Croatian alpine skier, member of the Croatian Alpine Ski Team.

Mišak was born in Varaždin, in Croatia. She has not participated in FIS Alpine Ski World Cup. Her best result so far in a FIS race was 1st place in giant slalom. In slalom races at the FIS Alpine World Ski Championships she placed 35th in 2011 and 43rd in 2013.
