= Susanne Riesch =

German alpine skier (born 1987)

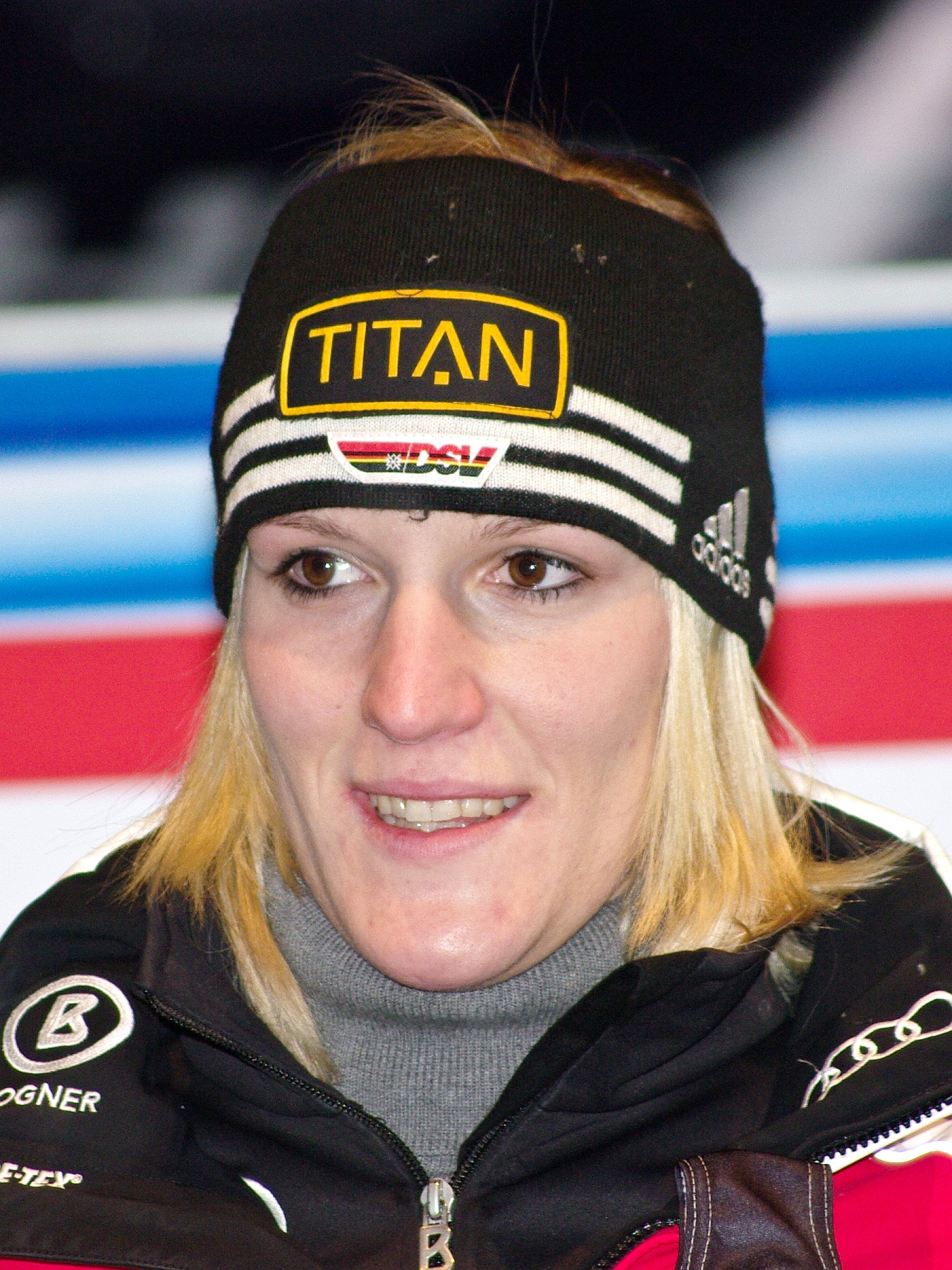
Susanne Riesch in 2010

Susanne Riesch (born 8 December 1987, in Garmisch-Partenkirchen, Bavaria, West Germany) is a former alpine ski racer. She is the sister of Maria Höfl-Riesch, overall World Cup Champion for season 2010/2011. She is also the niece of Wolfgang Zimmerer who was a bobsledder during the 1960s and 1970s and who with Peter Utzschneider, won gold for West Germany at the Two-man bobsleigh during the 1972 Winter Olympics.

Riesch has won two podiums in the Alpine skiing world cup, both 3rd places in slalom during the 2009-2010 World Cup season (Åre, Sweden and Zagreb, Croatia).

In January 2015, ten months after her sister's retirement, Susanne Riesch announced that she was retiring due to struggling with injuries.
