= Mizue Hoshi =

Japanese alpine skier (born 1985)

Personal information
- Nationality: Japanese
- Born: 2 September 1985 (age 39); Yunotani, Japan

Sport
- Sport: Alpine skiing

Mizue Hoshi (星 瑞枝, Hoshi Mizue, born 2 September 1985) is a Japanese alpine skier. She competed in the women's slalom at the 2006 Winter Olympics.
