= FIS Alpine World Ski Championships 2017 – Nations team event =

2017 World Champs Team Event: Feb 14

Nations team event at the FIS Alpine World Ski Championships 2017
- Venue: Piz Nair
- Location: St. Moritz, Switzerland
- Dates: 14 February
- Competitors: 96 from 16 nations
- Teams: 16

Medalists
gold medal	Adeline Baud Mugnier; Nastasia Noens; Tessa Worley; Mathieu Faivre; Julien Lizeroux; Alexis Pinturault	France
silver medal	Tereza Jančová; Veronika Velez-Zuzulová; Petra Vlhová; Matej Falat; Adam Žampa; Andreas Žampa	Slovakia
bronze medal	Frida Hansdotter; Maria Pietilä Holmner; Emelie Wikström; Mattias Hargin; Gustav Lundbäck; Andre Myhrer	Sweden

The Team Event competition at the 2017 World Championships was held on 14 February 2017.

== FIS Overall Nations Cup standings ==
The participating nations were seeded according to the Overall Nations Cup standings prior to the World Championships:

Rank	Country	Points
1	Austria	6319
2	Italy	5600
3	Switzerland	4783
4	France	4171
5	Norway	3814
6	United States	3151
7	Germany	2164
8	Sweden	1728
9	Slovenia	1710
10	Slovakia	1006
11	Canada	997
12	Liechtenstein	590
13	Czech Republic	433
14	Russia	342
15	Great Britain	325
16	Japan	142
17	Hungary	131
18	Croatia	100
19	Finland	52
20	Serbia	30
21	South Korea	23
22	Belgium	13
23	Latvia	9
24	Belarus	8
25	Monaco	7
26	Andorra	5
–	Argentina	0

== Results ==
The event was started at 12:00.

=== Bracket ===
Round of 16
Austria	3
Belgium	1
Sweden	4
Slovenia	0
Norway	3
Czech Republic	1
France	3
Russia	1
Switzerland	4
Croatia	0
United States	2
Canada	2
Germany	1
Slovakia	3
Italy	4
Argentina	0

Quarterfinals
Austria	1
Sweden	4
Norway	1
France	3
Switzerland	2
Canada	2
Slovakia	3
Italy	1

Semifinals
Sweden	2
France	2
Switzerland	2
Slovakia	2

Final
France	2
Slovakia	2
Third place
Sweden	3
Switzerland	1
