= 2009–10 FIS Alpine Ski World Cup =

International sports competition

FIS Alpine Ski World Cup 2009/10
Discipline	Men	Women
Overall	(Switzerland) Carlo Janka	(United States) Lindsey Vonn
Downhill	(Switzerland) Didier Cuche	(United States) Lindsey Vonn
Super-G	(Canada) Erik Guay	(United States) Lindsey Vonn
Giant slalom	(United States) Ted Ligety	(Germany) Kathrin Hölzl
Slalom	(Austria) Reinfried Herbst	(Germany) Maria Riesch
Super combined	(Austria) Benjamin Raich	(United States) Lindsey Vonn
Nations Cup	Austria	Austria
- Nations Cup Overall: Austria

Competition
Locations	16	15
Individual	34	32
Mixed	1	1
Cancelled	—	1
Rescheduled	1	1

2010 World Cup Champions

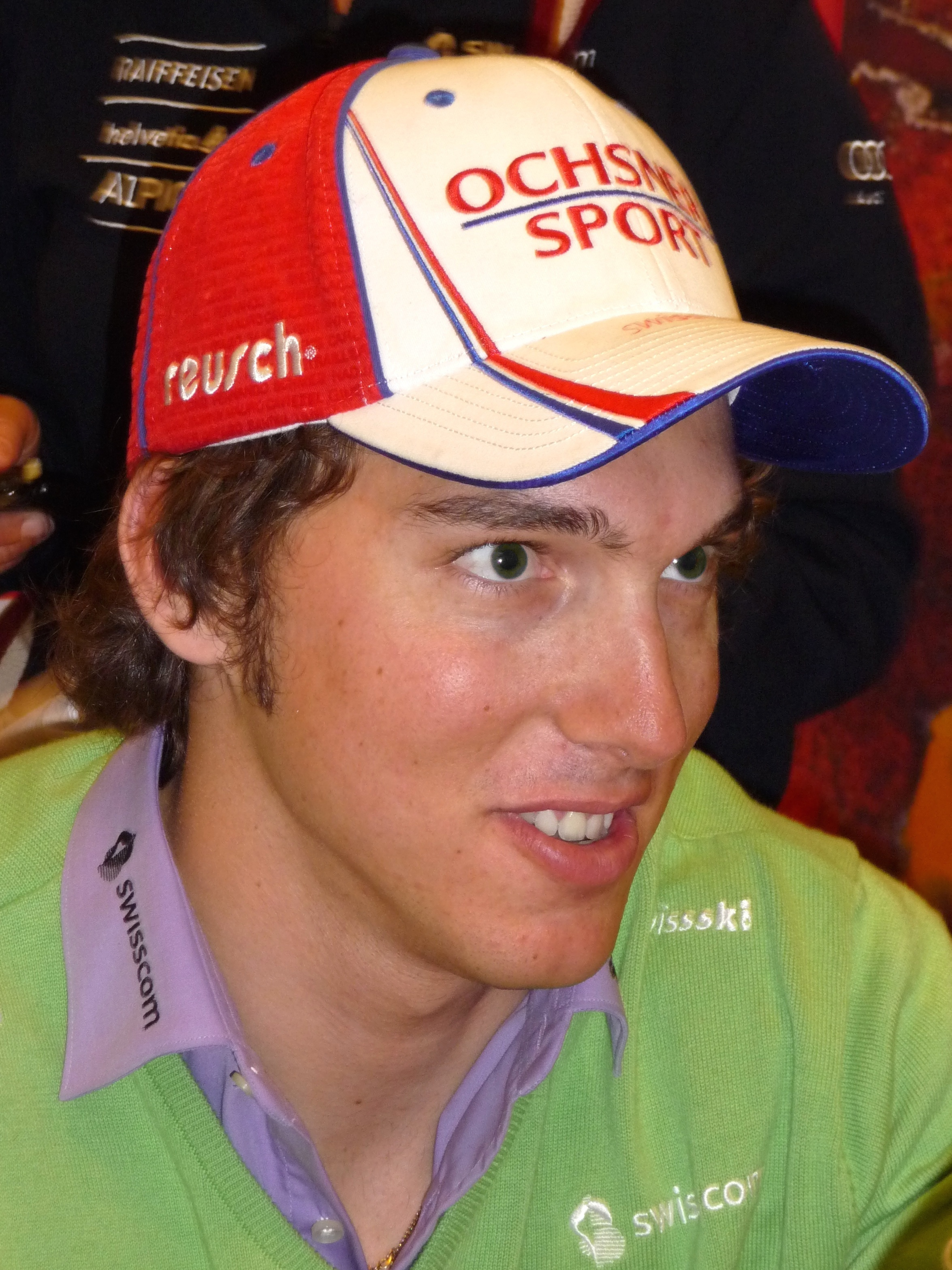
Carlo Janka

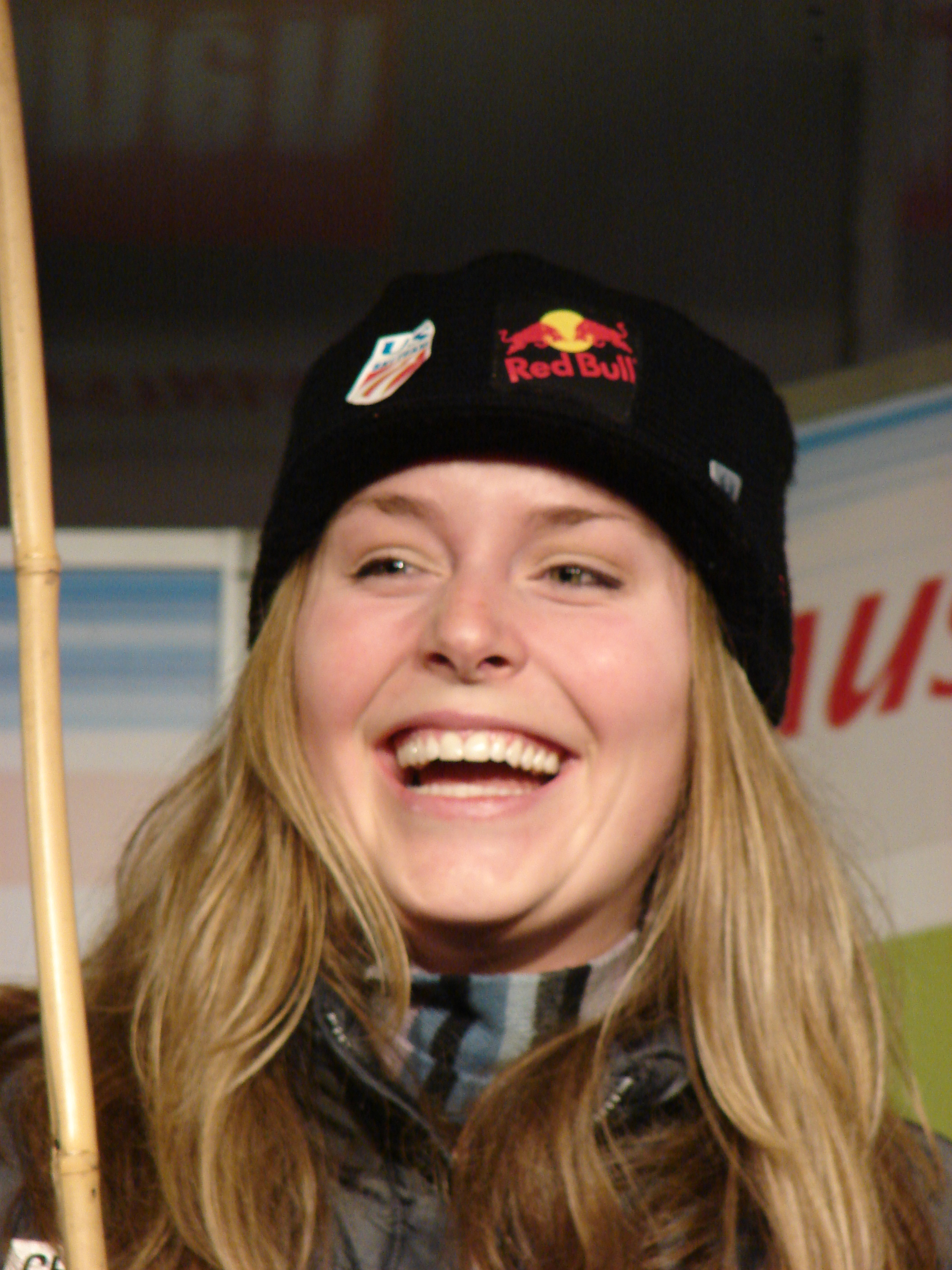
Lindsey Vonn

The 44th World Cup season began on 24 October 2009, in Sölden, Austria, and concluded on 14 March 2010, at the World Cup finals in Garmisch, Germany.

No World Cup events were scheduled in February because of the 2010 Winter Olympics in Vancouver, Canada; the Olympic alpine events were scheduled for 13–27 February at Whistler Mountain.

The overall titles were won by Carlo Janka of Switzerland and Lindsey Vonn of the U.S., her third consecutive.

The 2010 season also marked the end to a long and successful career for Liechtenstein skier Marco Büchel.

FIS standards require that three events be completed in a discipline for a discipline trophy to be awarded. During this season, there were only three combined races (all super-combined) scheduled for the women. Because the third race was cancelled on 5 March, FIS had to make a decision about whether an official trophy would be awarded for the discipline. Ultimately, FIS decided to award the discipline trophy to the leader after two events, Lindsey Vonn, giving her four crystal globes for the year (overall, downhill, Super G and combined).

== Calendar ==
=== Men ===
Event key: DH – Downhill, SL – Slalom, GS – Giant slalom, SG – Super giant slalom, KB – Classic Combined, SC – Super combined
Race	Season	Date	Place	Type	Winner	Second	Third	Details
1374	1	25 October 2009	(Austria) Sölden	GS _{334}	(Switzerland) Didier Cuche	(United States) Ted Ligety	(Switzerland) Carlo Janka	
1375	2	15 November 2009	(Finland) Levi	SL _{392}	(Austria) Reinfried Herbst	(Croatia) Ivica Kostelić	(France) Jean-Baptiste Grange	
1376	3	28 November 2009	(Canada) Lake Louise	DH _{397}	(Switzerland) Didier Cuche	(Italy) Werner Heel	(Switzerland) Carlo Janka	
1377	4	29 November 2009	(Canada) Lake Louise	SG _{147}	(Canada) Manuel Osborne-Paradis	(Austria) Benjamin Raich	(Austria) Michael Walchhofer	
1378	5	4 December 2009	(United States) Beaver Creek	SC _{105}	(Switzerland) Carlo Janka	(Switzerland) Didier Défago	(Croatia) Natko Zrnčić-Dim	
1379	6	5 December 2009	(United States) Beaver Creek	DH _{398}	(Switzerland) Carlo Janka	(Switzerland) Didier Cuche	(Norway) Aksel Lund Svindal	
1380	7	6 December 2009	(United States) Beaver Creek	GS _{335}	(Switzerland) Carlo Janka	(Austria) Benjamin Raich	(Norway) Aksel Lund Svindal	
1381	8	11 December 2009	(France) Val d'Isère	SC _{106}	(Austria) Benjamin Raich	(Austria) Marcel Hirscher	(Italy) Manfred Mölgg (Austria) Romed Baumann	
1382	9	12 December 2009	(France) Val d'Isère	SG _{148}	(Austria) Michael Walchhofer	(United States) Ted Ligety	(Italy) Werner Heel	
1383	10	13 December 2009	(France) Val d'Isère	GS _{336}	(Austria) Marcel Hirscher	(Italy) Massimiliano Blardone	(Austria) Benjamin Raich	
1384	11	18 December 2009	(Italy) Val Gardena	SG _{149}	(Norway) Aksel Lund Svindal	(Switzerland) Carlo Janka	(Italy) Patrick Staudacher	
1385	12	19 December 2009	(Italy) Val Gardena	DH _{399}	(Canada) Manuel Osborne-Paradis	(Austria) Mario Scheiber	(France) Johan Clarey (Switzerland) Ambrosi Hoffmann	
1386	13	20 December 2009	(Italy) Alta Badia	GS _{337}	(Italy) Massimiliano Blardone	(Italy) Davide Simoncelli	(France) Cyprien Richard	
1387	14	21 December 2009	(Italy) Alta Badia	SL _{393}	(Austria) Reinfried Herbst	(Switzerland) Silvan Zurbriggen	(Austria) Manfred Pranger	
1388	15	29 December 2009	(Italy) Bormio	DH _{400}	(Slovenia) Andrej Jerman	(Switzerland) Didier Défago	(Austria) Michael Walchhofer	
1389	16	6 January 2010	(Croatia) Zagreb	SL _{394}	(Italy) Giuliano Razzoli	(Italy) Manfred Mölgg	(France) Julien Lizeroux	
		9 January 2010	(Switzerland) Adelboden	GS _{cnx}	fog; 1st run incomplete; replaced in Kranjska Gora on 26 January 2010			
1390	17	10 January 2010	(Switzerland) Adelboden	SL _{395}	(France) Julien Lizeroux	(Austria) Marcel Hirscher	(Croatia) Ivica Kostelić	
1391	18	15 January 2010	(Switzerland) Wengen	SC _{107}	(United States) Bode Miller	(Switzerland) Carlo Janka	(Switzerland) Silvan Zurbriggen	
1392	19	16 January 2010	(Switzerland) Wengen	DH _{401}	(Switzerland) Carlo Janka	(Canada) Manuel Osborne-Paradis	(Liechtenstein) Marco Büchel	
1393	20	17 January 2010	(Switzerland) Wengen	SL _{396}	(Croatia) Ivica Kostelić	(Sweden) André Myhrer	(Austria) Reinfried Herbst	
1394	21	22 January 2010	(Austria) Kitzbühel	SG _{150}	(Switzerland) Didier Cuche	(Austria) Michael Walchhofer	(Austria) Georg Streitberger	
1395	22	23 January 2010	(Austria) Kitzbühel	DH _{402}	(Switzerland) Didier Cuche	(Slovenia) Andrej Šporn	(Italy) Werner Heel	
1396	23	24 January 2010	(Austria) Kitzbühel	SL _{397}	(Germany) Felix Neureuther	(France) Julien Lizeroux	(Italy) Giuliano Razzoli	
1397	24	24 January 2010	(Austria) Kitzbühel	KB _{108}	(Croatia) Ivica Kostelić	(Switzerland) Silvan Zurbriggen	(Austria) Benjamin Raich	
1398	25	26 January 2010	(Austria) Schladming	SL _{398}	(Austria) Reinfried Herbst	(Switzerland) Silvan Zurbriggen	(Austria) Manfred Pranger	
1399	26	(Note: Giant slalom from Adelboden was rescheduled to Kranjska Gora on 26 January 2010)29 January 2010	(Slovenia) Kranjska Gora	GS _{338}	(United States) Ted Ligety	(Austria) Marcel Hirscher	(Norway) Kjetil Jansrud	
1400	27	30 January 2010	(Slovenia) Kranjska Gora	GS _{339}	(Austria) Marcel Hirscher	(Norway) Kjetil Jansrud	(United States) Ted Ligety	
1401	28	31 January 2010	(Slovenia) Kranjska Gora	SL _{399}	(Austria) Reinfried Herbst	(Austria) Marcel Hirscher	(France) Julien Lizeroux	
2010 Winter Olympics (14–26 February)
1402	29	6 March 2010	(Norway) Kvitfjell	DH _{403}	(Switzerland) Didier Cuche	(Norway) Aksel Lund Svindal	(Austria) Klaus Kröll	
1403	30	7 March 2010	(Norway) Kvitfjell	SG _{151}	(Canada) Erik Guay	(Austria) Hannes Reichelt	(Norway) Aksel Lund Svindal (Switzerland) Tobias Grünenfelder	
1404	31	10 March 2010	(Germany) Garmisch-Partenkirchen	DH _{404}	(Switzerland) Carlo Janka	(Austria) Mario Scheiber	(Canada) Erik Guay (Switzerland) Patrick Küng	
1405	32	11 March 2010	(Germany) Garmisch-Partenkirchen	SG _{152}	(Canada) Erik Guay	(Croatia) Ivica Kostelić	(Norway) Aksel Lund Svindal	
1406	33	12 March 2010	(Germany) Garmisch-Partenkirchen	GS _{340}	(Switzerland) Carlo Janka	(Italy) Davide Simoncelli	(Austria) Philipp Schörghofer (United States) Ted Ligety	
1407	34	13 March 2010	(Germany) Garmisch-Partenkirchen	SL _{400}	(Germany) Felix Neureuther	(Austria) Manfred Pranger	(Sweden) André Myhrer	

=== Ladies ===
Event key: DH – Downhill, SL – Slalom, GS – Giant slalom, SG – Super giant slalom, SC – Super combined
Race	Season	Date	Place	Type	Winner	Second	Third	Details
1286	1	24 October 2009	(Austria) Sölden	GS _{333}	(Finland) Tanja Poutiainen	(Austria) Kathrin Zettel	(Italy) Denise Karbon	
1287	2	14 November 2009	(Finland) Levi	SL _{374}	(Germany) Maria Riesch	(United States) Lindsey Vonn	(Finland) Tanja Poutiainen	
1288	3	28 November 2009	(United States) Aspen	GS _{334}	(Germany) Kathrin Hölzl	(Austria) Kathrin Zettel	(Italy) Federica Brignone	
1289	4	29 November 2009	(United States) Aspen	SL _{375}	(Czech Republic) Šárka Záhrobská	(Austria) Marlies Schild	(Austria) Kathrin Zettel	
1290	5	4 December 2009	(Canada) Lake Louise	DH _{329}	(United States) Lindsey Vonn	(Canada) Emily Brydon	(Germany) Maria Riesch	
1291	6	5 December 2009	(Canada) Lake Louise	DH _{330}	(United States) Lindsey Vonn	(Germany) Maria Riesch	(Canada) Emily Brydon	
1292	7	6 December 2009	(Canada) Lake Louise	SG _{165}	(Austria) Elisabeth Görgl	(United States) Lindsey Vonn	(France) Ingrid Jacquemod	
1293	8	12 December 2009	(Sweden) Åre	GS _{335}	(France) Tessa Worley	(Slovenia) Tina Maze	(Austria) Kathrin Zettel	
1294	9	13 December 2009	(Sweden) Åre	SL _{376}	(France) Sandrine Aubert	(Germany) Maria Riesch	(Germany) Susanne Riesch	
1295	10	18 December 2009	(France) Val d'Isère	SC _{085}	(United States) Lindsey Vonn	(Germany) Maria Riesch	(Austria) Elisabeth Görgl	
		19 December 2009	(France) Val d'Isère	DH _{cnx}	snowfall & wind; replaced in Haus im Ennstal 8 January 2010			
1296	11	20 December 2009	(France) Val d'Isère	SG _{166}	(Switzerland) Fränzi Aufdenblatten	(Switzerland) Nadia Styger	(United States) Lindsey Vonn	
1297	12	28 December 2009	(Austria) Lienz	GS _{336}	(Germany) Kathrin Hölzl	(Italy) Manuela Mölgg	(France) Taïna Barioz	
1298	13	29 December 2009	(Austria) Lienz	SL _{377}	(Austria) Marlies Schild	(France) Sandrine Aubert	(Austria) Kathrin Zettel	
1299	14	3 January 2010	(Croatia) Zagreb	SL _{378}	(France) Sandrine Aubert	(Austria) Kathrin Zettel	(Germany) Susanne Riesch	
1300	15	(Note: Downhill from Val d'Isère was rescheduled to Haus im Ennstal on 8 January 2010)8 January 2010	(Austria) Haus im Ennstal	DH _{331}	(United States) Lindsey Vonn	(Sweden) Anja Pärson	(Germany) Maria Riesch	
1301	16	9 January 2010	(Austria) Haus im Ennstal	DH _{332}	(United States) Lindsey Vonn	(Switzerland) Nadja Kamer	(France) Ingrid Jacquemod	
1302	17	10 January 2010	(Austria) Haus im Ennstal	SG _{167}	(United States) Lindsey Vonn	(Sweden) Anja Pärson	(Italy) Nadia Fanchini (Switzerland) Martina Schild	
1303	18	12 January 2010	(Austria) Flachau	SL _{379}	(Austria) Marlies Schild	(Germany) Maria Riesch	(Austria) Kathrin Zettel	
1304	19	16 January 2010	(Slovenia) Maribor	GS _{337}	(Austria) Kathrin Zettel	(Germany) Maria Riesch	(Sweden) Anja Pärson	
1305	20	17 January 2010	(Slovenia) Maribor	SL _{380}	(Austria) Kathrin Zettel	(Slovenia) Tina Maze	(Germany) Maria Riesch	
1306	21	22 January 2010	(Italy) Cortina	SG _{168}	(United States) Lindsey Vonn	(Switzerland) Fabienne Suter	(Sweden) Anja Pärson	
1307	22	23 January 2010	(Italy) Cortina	DH _{333}	(United States) Lindsey Vonn	(Germany) Maria Riesch	(Sweden) Anja Pärson (Switzerland) Nadja Kamer	
1308	23	24 January 2010	(Italy) Cortina	GS _{338}	(Finland) Tanja Poutiainen	(Germany) Viktoria Rebensburg	(Germany) Kathrin Hölzl	
1309	24	29 January 2010	(Switzerland) St. Moritz	SC _{086}	(Sweden) Anja Pärson	(Austria) Michaela Kirchgasser	(United States) Lindsey Vonn	
1310	25	30 January 2010	(Switzerland) St. Moritz	DH _{334}	(Germany) Maria Riesch	(France) Ingrid Jacquemod	(Switzerland) Fabienne Suter	
1311	26	31 January 2010	(Switzerland) St. Moritz	SG _{169}	(United States) Lindsey Vonn	(Austria) Andrea Fischbacher (France) Marie Marchand-Arvier		
2010 Winter Olympics (14–26 February)
		5 March 2010	(Switzerland) Crans-Montana	SC _{cnx}	high winds			
1312	27	6 March 2010	(Switzerland) Crans-Montana	DH _{335}	(United States) Lindsey Vonn	(Italy) Johanna Schnarf	(Switzerland) Marianne Abderhalden	
1313	28	7 March 2010	(Switzerland) Crans-Montana	SG _{170}	(Switzerland) Dominique Gisin	(United States) Lindsey Vonn	(United States) Julia Mancuso	
1314	29	10 March 2010	(Germany) Garmisch-Partenkirchen	DH _{336}	(Germany) Maria Riesch	(United States) Lindsey Vonn	(Sweden) Anja Pärson	
1315	30	11 March 2010	(Germany) Garmisch-Partenkirchen	GS _{339}	(Slovenia) Tina Maze	(Germany) Kathrin Hölzl	(Germany) Maria Riesch	
1316	31	12 March 2010	(Germany) Garmisch-Partenkirchen	SG _{171}	(United States) Lindsey Vonn	(Austria) Elisabeth Görgl	(Switzerland) Nadia Styger	
1317	32	13 March 2010	(Germany) Garmisch-Partenkirchen	SL _{381}	(Austria) Marlies Schild	(Austria) Kathrin Zettel	(Germany) Maria Riesch	

=== Nation team event ===
Event key: PG – Parallel giant slalom
Race	Season	Date	Place	Type	Winner	Second	Third	Details
4	1	14 March 2010	(Germany) Garmisch-Partenkirchen	PG _{001}	Czech Republic Lucie Hrstková; Šárka Záhrobská; Ondřej Bank; Kryštof Krýzl	Switzerland Nadja Kamer; Nadia Styger; Fabienne Suter; Marc Berthod; Marc Gini; Sandro Viletta	Austria Elisabeth Görgl; Michaela Kirchgasser; Kathrin Zettel; Romed Baumann; Marcel Hirscher; Benjamin Raich	

== Men's standings ==
=== Overall ===
Rank	after all 34 races	Points
1	(Switzerland) Carlo Janka	1197
2	(Austria) Benjamin Raich	1091
3	(Switzerland) Didier Cuche	952
4	(Norway) Aksel Lund Svindal	883
5	(Croatia) Ivica Kostelić	805

=== Downhill ===
Rank	after all 8 races	Points
1	(Switzerland) Didier Cuche	528
2	(Switzerland) Carlo Janka	448
3	(Italy) Werner Heel	292
4	(Canada) Manuel Osborne-Paradis	281
5	(Austria) Mario Scheiber	273

=== Super G ===
Rank	after all 6 races	Points
1	(Canada) Erik Guay	331
2	(Austria) Michael Walchhofer	316
3	(Norway) Aksel Lund Svindal	314
4	(Austria) Benjamin Raich	210
5	(Austria) Mario Scheiber	199

=== Giant slalom ===
Rank	after all 7 races	Points
1	(United States) Ted Ligety	412
2	(Switzerland) Carlo Janka	341
3	(Austria) Benjamin Raich	331
4	(Italy) Davide Simoncelli	311
5	(Italy) Massimiliano Blardone	309

=== Slalom ===
Rank	after all 9 races	Points
1	(Austria) Reinfried Herbst	534
2	(France) Julien Lizeroux	512
3	(Switzerland) Silvan Zurbriggen	365
4	(Croatia) Ivica Kostelić	360
5	(Germany) Felix Neureuther	329

=== Super combined ===
Rank	after all 4 races	Points
1	(Austria) Benjamin Raich	246
2	(Switzerland) Carlo Janka	216
3	(Croatia) Ivica Kostelić	172
4	(Switzerland) Silvan Zurbriggen	166
5	(United States) Bode Miller	145

== Ladies' standings ==
=== Overall ===
Rank	after all 32 races	Points
1	(United States) Lindsey Vonn	1671
2	(Germany) Maria Riesch	1516
3	(Sweden) Anja Pärson	1047
4	(Slovenia) Tina Maze	943
5	(Austria) Kathrin Zettel	938

=== Downhill ===
Rank	after all 8 races	Points
1	(United States) Lindsey Vonn	725
2	(Germany) Maria Riesch	556
3	(Sweden) Anja Pärson	385
4	(France) Ingrid Jacquemod	271
5	(Switzerland) Nadja Kamer	266

=== Super G ===
Rank	after all 7 races	Points
1	(United States) Lindsey Vonn	620
2	(Austria) Elisabeth Görgl	300
3	(Switzerland) Nadia Styger	291
4	(Switzerland) Fabienne Suter	266
5	(Austria) Andrea Fischbacher	239

=== Giant slalom ===
Rank	after all 7 races	Points
1	(Germany) Kathrin Hölzl	471
2	(Austria) Kathrin Zettel	394
3	(Slovenia) Tina Maze	372
4	(Germany) Viktoria Rebensburg	271
5	(Finland) Tanja Poutiainen	263

=== Slalom ===
Rank	after all 8 races	Points
1	(Germany) Maria Riesch	493
2	(Austria) Kathrin Zettel	490
3	(Austria) Marlies Schild	420
4	(France) Sandrine Aubert	406
5	(Czech Republic) Šárka Záhrobská	347

=== Super combined ===
Rank	after all 2 races	Points
1	(United States) Lindsey Vonn	160
2	(Sweden) Anja Pärson	150
3	(Austria) Michaela Kirchgasser	130
4	(Austria) Elisabeth Görgl	110
5	(Germany) Maria Riesch	80

== Nations Cup ==
=== Overall ===
Rank	after all 66 races	Points
1	Austria	9207
2	Switzerland	7263
3	Italy	5093
4	France	4428
5	United States	4131

=== Men ===
Rank	after all 34 races	Points
1	Austria	5467
2	Switzerland	4502
3	Italy	2903
4	France	2024
5	Canada	1852

=== Ladies ===
Rank	after all 32 races	Points
1	Austria	3740
2	Germany	2761
3	Switzerland	2601
4	United States	2599
5	France	2404
