= Ofterschwang =

- Municipality
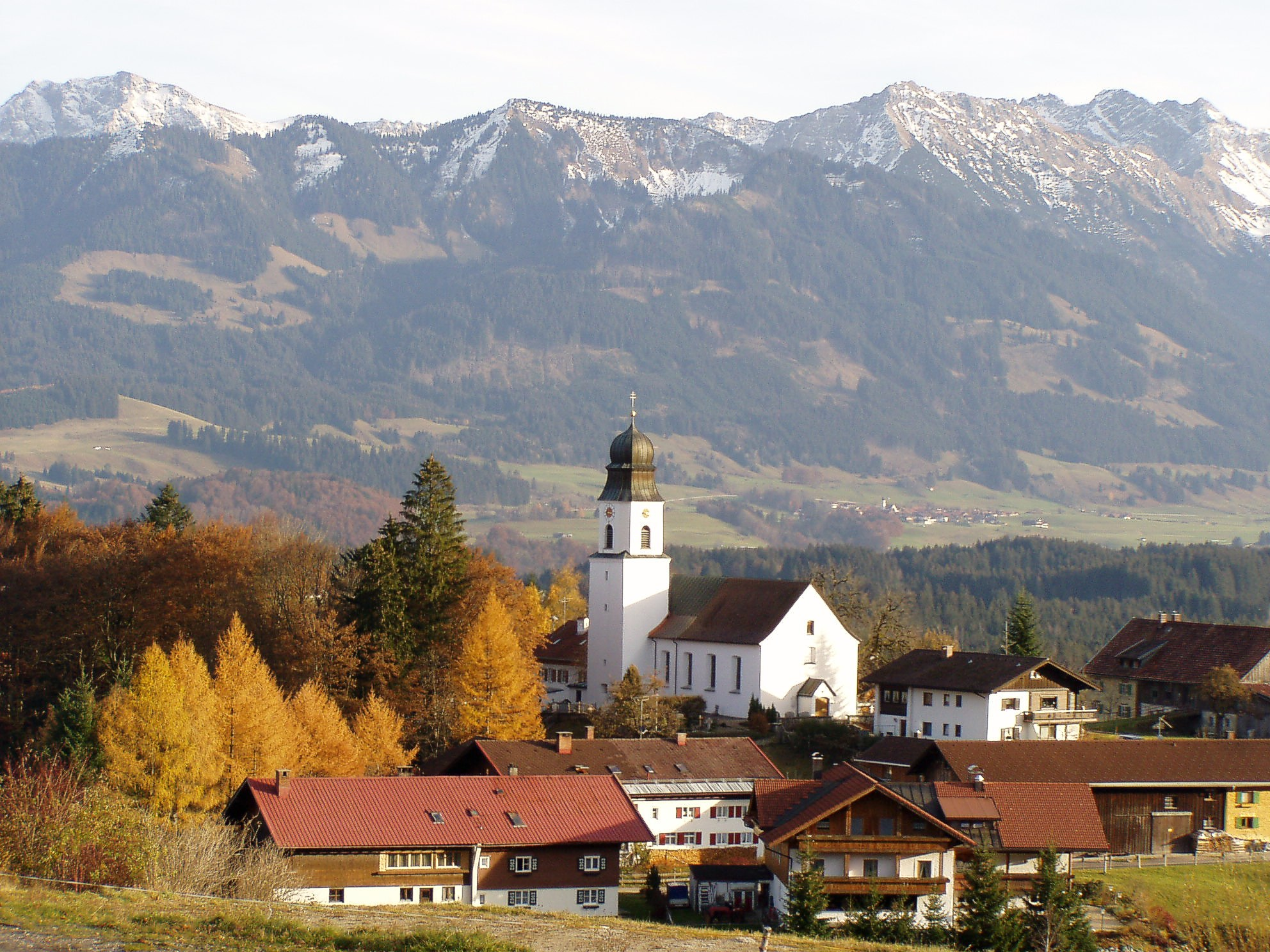
- Ofterschwang seen from the northwest

- Coat of arms

- Location of Ofterschwang within Oberallgäu district
- Interactive map of Ofterschwang
- Location within Germany Location within Bavaria
- Coordinates: 47°30′N 10°14′E
- Country: Germany
- State: Bavaria
- Admin. region: Schwaben
- District: Oberallgäu
- Municipal assoc.: Hörnergruppe

Government
  - Mayor (2020–26): Alois Ried

Area
  - Total: 19.56 km^{2} (7.55 sq mi)
- Elevation: 864 m (2,835 ft)

Population (2025-12-31)
  - Total: 2,035
  - Density: 104.0/km^{2} (269.5/sq mi)
- Time zone: UTC+01:00 (CET)
  - Summer (DST): UTC+02:00 (CEST)
- Postal codes: 87527
- Dialling codes: 08321
- Vehicle registration: OA
- Website: ofterschwang.de

Ofterschwang (German pronunciation: [ˈɔftɐʃvaŋ]) is a municipality in southern Germany, in Oberallgäu, Bavaria. It is a professional winter sports venue, regularly used for World Cup alpine events.
