= FIS Alpine World Ski Championships 2013 – Women's giant slalom =

Women's giant slalom at the FIS Alpine World Ski Championships 2013
- Venue: Planai; Schladming, Austria
- Date: 14 February 2013
- Competitors: 139 from 55 nations
- Winning time: 2:08.06

Medalists
gold medal	Tessa Worley	France
silver medal	Tina Maze	Slovenia
bronze medal	Anna Fenninger	Austria

Complete results for Women's giant slalom competition at the 2013 World Championships. It was held on February 14, the eighth race of the championships, and 139 athletes from 55 countries competed.

== Results ==
The first run started at 10:00 local time (UTC+1) and the second run at 13:30.

Rank	Bib	Name	Nation	Run 1	Rank	Run 2	Rank	Total	Difference
1st place, gold medalist(s)	1	Tessa Worley	France	1:04.90	1	1:03.16	1	2:08.06	
2nd place, silver medalist(s)	3	Tina Maze	Slovenia	1:05.99	4	1:03.19	2	2:09.18	+1.12
3rd place, bronze medalist(s)	2	Anna Fenninger	Austria	1:05.75	3	1:03.49	3	2:09.24	+1.18
4	4	Kathrin Zettel	Austria	1:05.42	2	1:04.18	16	2:09.60	+1.54
5	8	Frida Hansdotter	Sweden	1:06.55	5	1:03.78	8	2:10.34	+2.28
6	16	Mikaela Shiffrin	United States	1:06.55	5	1:03.79	9	2:10.36	+2.30
7	13	Lara Gut	Switzerland	1:06.93	10	1:03.51	4	2:10.44	+2.38
8	18	Marie-Michèle Gagnon	Canada	1:06.78	7	1:03.91	10	2:10.69	+2.63
9	15	Maria Höfl-Riesch	Germany	1:07.34	14	1:03.74	6	2:11.08	+3.02
10	20	Ana Drev	Slovenia	1:07.28	13	1:03.93	12	2:11.21	+3.15
11	24	Manuela Mölgg	Italy	1:07.47	16	1:03.92	11	2:11.39	+3.33
11	5	Viktoria Rebensburg	Germany	1:06.97	11	1:04.42	19	2:11.39	+3.33
13	7	Jessica Lindell-Vikarby	Sweden	1:06.81	9	1:04.96	23	2:11.77	+3.71
14	6	Irene Curtoni	Italy	1:07.00	12	1:04.85	22	2:11.85	+3.79
15	10	Tanja Poutiainen	Finland	1:07.45	15	1:04.65	21	2:12.10	+4.04
16	23	Marion Bertrand	France	1:08.04	18	1:04.10	15	2:12.14	+4.08
17	29	Veronique Hronek	Germany	1:08.14	21	1:04.04	13	2:12.18	4.12
18	22	Maria Pietilä Holmner	Sweden	1:08.67	27	1:03.65	5	2:12.32	+4.26
19	35	Emi Hasegawa	Japan	1:09.29	23	1:04.04	13	2:12.37	+4.31
20	26	Anne-Sophie Barthet	France	1:08.65	25	1:03.74	6	2:12.30	+4.33
21	33	Ragnhild Mowinckel	Norway	1:08.10	19	1:04.64	20	2:12.74	+4.68
22	9	Julia Mancuso	United States	1:07.79	17	1:05.01	25	2:12.80	+4.74
23	12	Elisabeth Görgl	Austria	1:08.10	19	1:05.15	26	2:13.25	+5.19
24	50	Daria Astapenko	Russia	1:09.19	30	1:04.18	16	2:13.37	+5.31
25	32	Mona Løseth	Norway	1:09.02	29	1:04.41	18	2:13.43	+5.37
26	39	Wendy Holdener	Switzerland	1:08.65	25	1:04.98	24	2:13.63	+5.57
27	36	Tina Weirather	Liechtenstein	1:08.36	24	1:05.29	27	2:13.65	+5.59
28	27	Marie-Pier Préfontaine	Canada	1:09.66	22	1:05.59	30	2:13.77	+5.71
29	45	Agnieszka Gąsienica-Daniel	Poland	1:09.34	33	1:05.47	29	2:14.81	+6.75
30	28	Lotte Smiseth Sejersted	Norway	1:09.66	37	1:05.44	28	2:15.10	+7.04
31	38	Hoshi Mizue	Japan	1:09.29	32	1:06.09	33	2:15.38	+7.32
32	41	Ilka Štuhec	Slovenia	1:09.38	34	1:06.61	35	2:15.99	+7.93
33	52	Barbara Kantorova	Slovakia	1:10.29	42	1:05.97	32	2:16.26	+8.20
34	53	Maryna Gąsienica-Daniel	Poland	1:10.47	44	1:05.82	31	2:16.29	+8.23
35	34	Nina Løseth	Norway	1:08.81	28	1:06.59	38	2.16.32	+8.26
36	56	Katja Horvat	Slovenia	1:10.33	43	1:06.59	34	2:16.92	+8.86
37	58	Šárka Záhrobská	Czech Republic	1:09.90	38	1:07.52	39	2:17.42	+9.36
38	42	Nina Halme	Finland	1:10.66	45	1:06.93	36	2:17.59	+9.53
39	55	Martina Dubovska	Czech Republic	1:10.75	47	1:07.15	37	2:17.90	+9.84
40	57	Adriana Jelinkova	Netherlands	1:11.15	48	1:07.55	40	2:18.70	+10.64
41	47	Nevena Ignjatović	Serbia	1:10.74	46	1:08.31	42	2:19.05	+10.99
42	51	Anastasia Romanova	Russia	1:11.69	49	1:08.05	41	2:19.74	+11.68
43	54	María Belén Simari Birkner	Argentina	1:11.85	50	1:08.33	43	2:20.18	+12.12
44	62	Žana Novaković	Bosnia and Herzegovina	1:10.18	41	1:10.87	46	2:21.05	+12.99
45	59	Greta Small	Australia	1:12.19	52	1:08.94	44	2:21.13	+13.07
46	70	Bogdana Matsotksa	Ukraine	1:13.70	55	1:10.08	45	2:23.78	+15.72
47	64	Saša Tršinski	Croatia	1:13.67	54	1:10.98	47	2:24.65	+16.59
48	71	Anna Berecz	Hungary	1:14.07	56	1:11.37	49	2:25.44	+17.38
49	66	Salome Bancora	Argentina	1:14.41	58	1:11.35	48	2:25.76	+17.70
50	79	Matilda Šola	Croatia	1:14.42	59	1:11.92	50	2:26.34	+18.28
51	78	Lelde Gasuna	Latvia	1:14.47	60	1:11.92	50	2:26.39	+18.33
52	77	Piera Hudson	New Zealand	1:14.13	57	1:20.72	52	2:34.85	+26.79
	30	Sara Hector	Sweden	1:06.80	8	DNF			
	49	Laurenne Ross	United States	1:09.42	35	DNF			
	60	Mandy Dirkzwager	Netherlands	1:11.94	51	DNF			
	46	Karolina Chrapek	Poland	1:12.22	53	DNF			
	44	Fabienne Suter	Switzerland	1:10.10	39	DNS			
	31	Carolina Ruiz Castillo	Spain	1:09.57	36	DNS			
	25	Lena Dürr	Germany	1:10.11	40	DNS			
	17	Denise Karbon	Italy	1:09.23	31	DNS			
61	72	Nino Tsiklauri	Georgia	1:14.89	61				
62	73	Tamara Zubčić	Croatia	1:15.01	62				
63	88	Freydís Halla Einarsdóttir	Iceland	1:16.13	63				
64	81	Isabel Van Buynder	Belgium	1:16.28	64				
65	69	Helga María Vilhjálmsdóttir	Iceland	1:16.28	64				
66	65	Noelle Barahona	Chile	1:16.84	66				
67	86	Amira Halilović	Bosnia and Herzegovina	1:16.91	67				
68	93	Anastasiia Gorbunova	Ukraine	1:18.44	68				
69	97	Roksana Tymchenko	Ukraine	1:18.48	69				
70	82	Charlotte Techen Lemgart	Denmark	1:19.26	70				
71	105	Kristina Kusmuk	Bosnia and Herzegovina	1:19.96	71				
72	98	Kristina Krone	Puerto Rico	1:20.16	72				
73	80	Stefanie Wyhmeister	Chile	1:20.45	73				
74	100	Sumejja Hadžić	Bosnia and Herzegovina	1:20.80	74				
75	104	Liene Bondare	Latvia	1:20.88	75				
76	103	Elise Pellegrin	Malta	1:21.43	76				
77	84	Macarena Montesinos	Chile	1:21.47	77				
78	85	Katrina Krumina	Latvia	1:22.33	78				
79	125	Sophia Ralli	Greece	1:22.47	79				
80	109	Anastasia Kokkini	Greece	1:22.70	80				
81	116	Ieva Januškevičiūtė	Lithuania	1:23.14	81				
82	113	Yom Hirschfeld	Israel	1:23.15	82				
83	95	Agnese Aboltina	Latvia	1:23.70	83				
84	111	Veronica Gaspar	United States Virgin Islands	1:23.94	84				
85	120	Natacha Mohabbat	Lebanon	1:24.05	85				
86	119	Areti Marakgou	Greece	1:24.18	86				
87	131	Reka Csima	Hungary	1:24.94	87				
88	128	Alexandra Taylor	Cyprus	1:25.16	88				
89	114	Paraskevi Mavridou	Greece	1:25.44	89				
90	130	olga Paliutkina	Kyrgyzstan	1:25.50	90				
91	134	Mary Photiades	Cyprus	1:26.25	91				
92	121	Reka Berecz	Hungary	1:26.34	92				
93	132	Jacky Chamoun	Lebanon	1:27.69	93				
94	117	Federica Selva	San Marino	1:28.02	94				
95	112	Gilit Buchler	Israel	1:29.38	95				
96	124	Ziba Kalhor	Iran	1:30.16	96				
97	123	Fatemeh Kiadarbandsari	Iran	1:31.19	97				
98	127	Jacky Chaumon	Lebanon	1:31.64	98				
99	122	Marjan Kalhor	Iran	1:35.96	99				
100	126	Mitra Kalhor	Iran	1:36.24	100				
101	133	Laura Bauer	South Africa	1:41.05	101				
102	137	Aanchal Thakur	India	1:46.57	102				
103	136	Varsha Devi	India	2:05.99	103				
	11	Dominique Gisin	Switzerland	DNF					
	19	Anemone Marmottan	France	DNF					
	21	Nadia Fanchini	Italy	DNF					
	40	Mikaela Tommy	Canada	DNF					
	43	Kateřina Pauláthová	Czech Republic	DNF					
	48	Merle Soppela	Finland	DNF					
	63	Julietta Quiroga	Argentina	DNF					
	67	Maria Kirkova	Bulgaria	DNF					
	68	Valentina Volopichova	Czech Republic	DNF					
	74	Maria Shkanova	Belarus	DNF					
	75	Tea Palić	Croatia	DNF					
	76	Harriet Miller-Brown	New Zealand	DNF					
	83	Lina Xia	China	DNF					
	87	Erla Ásgeirsdóttir	Iceland	DNF					
	89	Xiyue Qin	China	DNF					
	90	Tetyana Tikun	Ukraine	DNF					
	91	Javiera Cea	Chile	DNF					
	92	Victoria Bell	Ireland	DNF					
	96	Ksenyia Grigoreva	Uzbekistan	DNF					
	99	Malene Madsen	Denmark	DNF					
	101	Veronika Tomić	Serbia	DNF					
	106	Maša Janković	Serbia	DNF					
	107	Dora Dome	Hungary	DNF					
	110	Ivana Bulatović	Montenegro	DNF					
	115	Anastasiya Lesik	Belarus	DNF					
	118	Milena Radojičić	Montenegro	DNF					
	129	Lea Nassar	Lebanon	DNF					
	14	Michaela Kirchgasser	Austria	DQ					
	37	Tina Robnik	Slovenia	DQ					
	61	Macarena Simari Birkner	Argentina	DQ					
	102	Ronnie Kiek	Israel	DQ					
	108	Ornella Oettl Reyes	Peru	DQ					
	135	Pei-Chen Huang	Chinese Taipei	DQ					
	138	Tatevik Muradyan	Armenia	DQ					
	94	Yang Li	China	DNS					
	139	Eleonora Chiaruzzi	San Marino	DNS					
