= Alpine skiing at the 2014 Winter Olympics – Women's slalom =

Women's slalom at the XXII Olympic Winter Games
- Alpine skiing pictogram
- Venue: Rosa Khutor Alpine Resort
- Date: 21 February 2014
- Competitors: 85 from 48 nations
- Winning time: 1:44.54

Medalists
1st place, gold medalist(s)		Mikaela Shiffrin	United States
2nd place, silver medalist(s)		Marlies Schild	Austria
3rd place, bronze medalist(s)		Kathrin Zettel	Austria

The women's slalom competition of the Sochi 2014 Olympics was held at the Rosa Khutor Alpine Resort near Krasnaya Polyana, Russia, on 21 February.

18-year-old Mikaela Shiffrin won the gold medal, becoming the youngest slalom gold medalist in Olympic history.

== Results ==
The first run was held at 16:45 and the second run at 20:15.

Rank	Bib	Name	Nation	Run 1	Rank	Run 2	Rank	Total	Behind
1st place, gold medalist(s)	6	Mikaela Shiffrin	United States	52.62	1	51.92	6	1:44.54	—
2nd place, silver medalist(s)	7	Marlies Schild	Austria	53.96	6	51.11	1	1:45.07	+0.53
3rd place, bronze medalist(s)	12	Kathrin Zettel	Austria	54.00	7	51.35	2	1:45.35	+0.81
4	3	Maria Höfl-Riesch	Germany	53.11	2	52.62	9	1:45.73	+1.19
5	4	Frida Hansdotter	Sweden	54.05	8	51.85	4	1:45.90	+1.36
6	21	Emelie Wikström	Sweden	54.55	11	51.56	3	1:46.11	+1.57
7	8	Nastasia Noens	France	53.81	5	52.31	8	1:46.12	+1.58
8	5	Tina Maze	Slovenia	53.29	3	52.96	14	1:46.25	+1.71
9	11	Marie-Michèle Gagnon	Canada	54.32	10	53.05	15	1:47.37	+2.83
10	14	Šárka Strachová	Czech Republic	55.14	14	52.25	7	1:47.39	+2.85
11	9	Anna Swenn-Larsson	Sweden	54.58	12	53.33	19	1:47.91	+3.37
12	16	Tanja Poutiainen	Finland	54.94	13	53.07	16	1:48.01	+3.47
13	28	Anémone Marmottan	France	57.08	24	51.88	5	1:48.96	+4.42
14	22	Barbara Wirth	Germany	56.31	16	52.69	11	1:49.00	+4.46
15	23	Brittany Phelan	Canada	56.41	17	52.70	12	1:49.11	+4.57
16	29	Mona Løseth	Norway	56.82	21	52.62	9	1:49.44	+4.90
17	20	Denise Feierabend	Switzerland	55.80	15	53.67	22	1:49.47	+4.93
18	24	Anne-Sophie Barthet	France	56.99	23	53.12	17	1:50.11	+5.57
19	32	Maruša Ferk	Slovenia	57.43	26	52.73	13	1:50.16	+5.62
19	31	Petra Vlhova	Slovakia	56.42	18	53.74	23	1:50.16	+5.62
21	34	Marina Nigg	Liechtenstein	57.47	27	53.17	18	1:50.64	+6.10
22	39	Martina Dubovská	Czech Republic	57.80	28	53.62	21	1:51.42	+6.88
23	42	Ksenia Alopina	Russia	58.37	29	53.37	20	1:51.74	+7.20
24	51	Julia Ford	United States	58.88	30	53.99	24	1:52.87	+8.33
25	49	Salomé Báncora	Argentina	59.26	31	56.26	26	1:55.52	+10.98
26	59	Žana Novaković	Bosnia and Herzegovina	59.79	35	56.20	25	1:55.99	+11.45
27	52	Macarena Simari Birkner	Argentina	59.82	36	56.69	29	1:56.51	+11.97
28	25	Michelle Gisin	Switzerland	1:00.73	38	56.39	27	1:57.12	+12.58
29	50	Maria Shkanova	Belarus	59.67	33	57.56	31	1:57.23	+12.69
30	61	Lelde Gasūna	Latvia	1:00.47	37	56.82	30	1:57.29	+12.75
31	46	Greta Small	Australia	1:01.19	40	56.41	28	1:57.60	+13.06
32	56	Lavinia Chrystal	Australia	59.74	34	58.16	33	1:57.90	+13.36
33	48	Andrea Komšić	Croatia	1:00.82	39	57.78	32	1:58.60	+14.06
34	60	Helga María Vilhjálmsdóttir	Iceland	1:02.69	43	1:00.53	34	2:03.22	+18.68
35	65	Anna Berecz	Hungary	1:03.28	44	1:01.64	38	2:04.92	+20.38
36	64	Erla Ásgeirsdóttir	Iceland	1:03.55	45	1:01.53	36	2:05.08	+20.54
37	68	Agnese Āboltiņa	Latvia	1:05.44	49	1:01.18	35	2:06.62	+22.08
38	74	Sophia Ralli	Greece	1:05.20	47	1:01.57	37	2:06.77	+22.23
39	71	Maya Harrisson	Brazil	1:04.88	46	1:03.45	42	2:08.33	+23.79
40	75	Camille Dias	Portugal	1:05.24	48	1:03.26	41	2:08.50	+23.96
41	78	Tuğba Kocaağa	Turkey	1:06.22	51	1:02.74	40	2:08.96	+24.42
42	76	Élise Pellegrin	Malta	1:07.10	52	1:02.73	39	2:09.83	+25.29
43	72	Jasmine Campbell	Virgin Islands	1:06.09	50	1:04.28	43	2:10.37	+25.83
44	83	Ivana Bulatović	Montenegro	1:07.49	54	1:05.31	44	2:12.80	+28.26
45	82	Kenza Tazi	Morocco	1:10.19	56	1:06.96	45	2:17.15	+32.61
46	69	Triin Tobi	Estonia	1:11.43	57	1:09.02	47	2:20.45	+35.91
47	87	Jackie Chamoun	Lebanon	1:16.05	58	1:12.69	48	2:28.74	+44.20
48	86	Forough Abbasi	Iran	1:26.71	60	1:08.98	46	2:35.69	+51.15
49	54	Kang Young-seo	South Korea	1:18.84	59	1:17.61	49	2:36.45	+51.91
	1	Bernadette Schild	Austria	53.41	4	DNF			
	13	Michaela Kirchgasser	Austria	54.06	9	DNF			
	18	Chiara Costazza	Italy	57.32	25	DNF			
	26	Resi Stiegler	United States	56.81	20	DNF			
	30	Adeline Baud	France	56.50	19	DNF			
	33	Federica Brignone	Italy	56.98	22	DNF			
	37	Jana Gantnerová	Slovakia	59.26	31	DNF			
	57	Emily Bamford	Australia	1:02.13	41	DNF			
	58	Maria Kirkova	Bulgaria	1:02.33	42	DNF			
	73	Florence Bell	Ireland	1:07.48	53	DNF			
	81	Kseniya Grigoreva	Uzbekistan	1:07.77	55	DNF			
	41	Katarina Lavtar	Slovenia	DNS					
	79	Gaia Bassani Antivari	Azerbaijan	DNS					
	88	Alexandra Taylor	Cyprus	DNS					
	2	Maria Pietilä Holmner	Sweden	DNF					
	10	Wendy Holdener	Switzerland	DNF					
	15	Nina Løseth	Norway	DNF					
	19	Erin Mielzynski	Canada	DNF					
	27	Elli Terwiel	Canada	DNF					
	35	Nevena Ignjatović	Serbia	DNF					
	36	Aleksandra Kluś	Poland	DNF					
	38	Megan McJames	United States	DNF					
	40	Kateřina Pauláthová	Czech Republic	DNF					
	43	Sofija Novoselić	Croatia	DNF					
	44	Barbara Kantorová	Slovakia	DNF					
	45	Barbora Lukáčová	Slovakia	DNF					
	47	Mireia Gutiérrez	Andorra	DNF					
	53	Gim So-hui	South Korea	DNF					
	55	Julietta Quiroga	Argentina	DNF					
	62	Noelle Barahona	Chile	DNF					
	63	Maryna Gąsienica-Daniel	Poland	DNF					
	66	Karolina Chrapek	Poland	DNF					
	67	Nino Tsiklauri	Georgia	DNF					
	70	Xia Lina	China	DNF					
	77	Ieva Januškevičiūtė	Lithuania	DNF					
	84	Ornella Oettl Reyes	Peru	DNF					
	85	Alessia Dipol	Togo	DNF					
	17	Christina Geiger	Germany	DSQ					
	80	Suela Mëhilli	Albania	DSQ					
