= FIS Alpine World Ski Championships 2017 – Women's giant slalom =

Women's giant slalom at the FIS Alpine World Ski Championships 2017
- Venue: Piz Nair
- Location: St. Moritz, Switzerland
- Dates: 16 February
- Competitors: 98 from 55 nations
- Winning time: 2:05.55

Medalists
gold medal	Tessa Worley	France
silver medal	Mikaela Shiffrin	United States
bronze medal	Sofia Goggia	Italy

The Women's giant slalom competition at the 2017 World Championships was held on 16 February 2017.

A qualification was held on 13 February 2017.

== Results ==
The first run started at 09:45 and the second run at 13:00.

Rank	Bib	Name	Nation	Run 1	Rank	Run 2	Rank	Total	Diff
1st place, gold medalist(s)	1	Tessa Worley	France	1:02.01	1	1:03.54	5	2:05.55	
2nd place, silver medalist(s)	4	Mikaela Shiffrin	United States	1:02.73	3	1:03.16	1	2:05.89	+0.34
3rd place, bronze medalist(s)	3	Sofia Goggia	Italy	1:02.49	2	1:03.80	8	2:06.29	+0.74
4	6	Federica Brignone	Italy	1:03.11	4	1:03.36	2	2:06.47	+0.92
5	13	Stephanie Brunner	Austria	1:03.35	8	1:03.50	4	2:06.85	+1.30
6	10	Manuela Mölgg	Italy	1:03.43	9	1:03.45	3	2:06.88	+1.33
7	7	Ana Drev	Slovenia	1:03.32	7	1:04.04	14	2:07.36	+1.81
8	16	Petra Vlhová	Slovakia	1:03.66	13	1:03.84	10	2:07.50	+1.95
9	19	Sara Hector	Sweden	1:03.68	14	1:03.83	9	2:07.51	+1.96
10	8	Nina Løseth	Norway	1:03.22	6	1:04.30	16	2:07.52	+1.97
11	5	Marta Bassino	Italy	1:03.50	10	1:04.03	13	2:07.53	+1.98
12	9	Michaela Kirchgasser	Austria	1:03.89	19	1:03.70	7	2:07.59	+2.04
13	25	Melanie Meillard	Switzerland	1:04.09	21	1:03.68	6	2:07.77	+2.22
14	20	Adeline Baud Mugnier	France	1:03.88	17	1:04.02	12	2:07.90	+2.35
14	15	Simone Wild	Switzerland	1:03.12	5	1:04.78	27	2:07.90	+2.35
16	17	Frida Hansdotter	Sweden	1:04.09	21	1:03.91	11	2:08.00	+2.45
17	27	Bernadette Schild	Austria	1:03.53	11	1:04.73	26	2:08.26	+2.71
18	11	Ragnhild Mowinckel	Norway	1:03.88	17	1:04.51	18	2:08.39	+2.84
19	12	Tina Weirather	Liechtenstein	1:03.79	16	1:04.66	23	2:08.45	+2.90
20	25	Marie-Michele Gagnon	Canada	1:04.04	20	1:04.55	20	2:08.59	+3.04
21	31	Megan McJames	United States	1:04.59	25	1:04.11	15	2:08.70	+3.15
22	22	Anna Veith	Austria	1:04.26	23	1:04.45	17	2:08.71	+3.16
23	30	Kristin Lysdahl	Norway	1:03.64	12	1:05.36	30	2:09.00	+3.45
24	26	Kajsa Kling	Sweden	1:04.71	27	1:04.55	20	2:09.26	+3.71
25	23	Maria Pietilä Holmner	Sweden	1:04.58	24	1:04.71	25	2:09.29	+3.74
26	41	Lena Dürr	Germany	1:04.85	29	1:04.57	22	2:09.42	+3.87
27	47	Nevena Ignjatović	Serbia	1:05.42	34	1:04.54	19	2:09.96	+4.41
28	29	Camille Rast	Switzerland	1:05.43	35	1:04.67	24	2:10.10	+4.55
29	48	Kateřina Pauláthová	Czech Republic	1:04.84	28	1:05.36	30	2:10.20	+4.65
30	33	Alexandra Tilley	Great Britain	1:05.16	31	1:05.42	32	2:10.58	+5.03
31	37	Kristina Riis-Johannessen	Norway	1:05.64	39	1:05.15	28	2:10.79	+5.24
32	51	Maryna Gąsienica-Daniel	Poland	1:05.60	36	1:05.24	29	2:10.84	+5.29
33	40	Maren Wiesler	Germany	1:05.25	32	1:05.96	33	2:11.21	+5.66
34	42	Riikka Honkanen	Finland	1:05.63	37	1:05.97	34	2:11.60	+6.05
35	32	Asa Ando	Japan	1:06.14	40	1:06.39	37	2:12.53	+6.98
36	46	Adriana Jelinkova	Netherlands	1:06.66	41	1:06.37	36	2:13.03	+7.48
37	59	Ester Ledecká	Czech Republic	1:06.70	42	1:06.45	38	2:13.15	+7.60
38	68	Aleksandra Prokopyeva	Russia	1:07.18	44	1:06.13	35	2:13.31	+7.76
39	53	Lelde Gasūna	Latvia	1:07.31	45	1:07.27	41	2:14.58	+9.03
40	55	Salomé Báncora	Argentina	1:07.56	47	1:07.18	40	2:14.74	+9.19
41	54	Sarah Schleper	Mexico	1:08.27	52	1:07.01	39	2:15.28	+9.73
42	66	Ida Štimac	Croatia	1:07.58	48	1:07.91	46	2:15.49	+9.94
43	64	Tereza Kmochová	Czech Republic	1:08.12	51	1:07.66	43	2:15.78	+10.23
44	67	Andrea Komšić	Croatia	1:07.93	49	1:08.18	47	2:16.11	+10.56
45	70	Vera Asenova	Bulgaria	1:08.71	59	1:07.44	42	2:16.15	+10.60
46	63	Maria Kirkova	Bulgaria	1:08.50	53	1:07.76	45	2:16.26	+10.71
47	74	Freydis Halla Einarsdóttir	Iceland	1:07.98	50	1:08.40	50	2:16.38	+10.83
47	65	Lana Zbašnik	Croatia	1:08.66	56	1:07.72	44	2:16.38	+10.83
49	72	Tereza Jančová	Slovakia	1:08.66	56	1:08.26	48	2:16.92	+11.38
50	73	Eliza Grigg	New Zealand	1:08.68	58	1:08.28	49	2:16.96	+11.41
51	62	Nicol Gastaldi	Argentina	1:08.65	55	1:08.98	51	2:17.63	+12.08
	71	Nino Tsiklauri	Georgia	1:08.77	61	DNQ			
	77	Žana Novaković	Bosnia and Herzegovina	1:08.98	62	DNQ			
	69	Kim Vanreusel	Belgium	1:09.00	63	DNQ			
	57	María Belén Simari Birkner	Argentina	1:09.26	64	DNQ			
	52	Cara Brown	Great Britain	1:09.85	65	DNQ			
	56	Noelle Barahona	Chile	1:10.07	66	DNQ			
	78	Olha Knysh	Ukraine	1:10.74	67	DNQ			
	76	Tess Arbez	Ireland	1:10.86	68	DNQ			
	80	Sabrina Simader	Kenya	1:11.15	69	DNQ			
	79	Charlotte Lemgart	Denmark	1:11.34	70	DNQ			
	82	Ieva Januškevičiūtė	Lithuania	1:12.68	71	DNQ			
	83	Sophia Ralli	Greece	1:12.97	72	DNQ			
	84	Yekaterina Karpova	Kazakhstan	1:13.08	73	DNQ			
	81	Ni Yueming	China	1:14.25	74	DNQ			
	87	Élise Pellegrin	Malta	1:15.51	75	DNQ			
	85	Catherine Elvinger	Luxembourg	1:15.75	76	DNQ			
	88	Ornella Oettl Reyes	Peru	1:16.18	77	DNQ			
	86	Suela Mëhilli	Albania	1:16.40	78	DNQ			
	90	Kseniya Grigoreva	Uzbekistan	1:17.38	79	DNQ			
	93	Laetitia El Khoury	Lebanon	1:18.41	80	DNQ			
	89	Nadežda Milošević	Montenegro	1:18.93	81	DNQ			
	91	Marjan Kalhor	Iran	1:21.36	82	DNQ			
	95	Catarina Carvalho	Portugal	1:22.20	83	DNQ			
	94	Olga Paliutkina	Kyrgyzstan	1:23.48	84	DNQ			
	97	Rachel Olivier	South Africa	1:25.90	85	DNQ			
	96	Aanchal Thakur	India	1:26.51	86	DNQ			
	98	Celine Marti	Haiti	1:43.38	87	DNQ			
	18	Ilka Štuhec	Slovenia	1:04.60	26	DNF			
	28	Tina Robnik	Slovenia	1:03.70	15	DNF			
	35	Jessica Hilzinger	Germany	1:05.37	33	DNF			
	36	Mikaela Tommy	Canada	1:04.95	30	DNF			
	45	Leona Popović	Croatia	1:07.04	43	DNF			
	58	Piera Hudson	New Zealand	1:08.51	54	DNF			
	60	Francesca Baruzzi	Argentina	1:08.76	60	DNF			
	61	Maria Shkanova	Belarus	1:07.47	46	DNF			
	39	Valérie Grenier	Canada	1:05.63	37	DNS			
	2	Viktoria Rebensburg	Germany	DNF					
	21	Coralie Frasse Sombet	France	DNF					
	34	Resi Stiegler	United States	DNF					
	38	Candace Crawford	Canada	DNF					
	43	Martina Dubovská	Czech Republic	DNF					
	44	Jasmina Suter	Switzerland	DNF					
	49	Kristina Kryukova	Russia	DNF					
	50	Nea Luukko	Finland	DNF					
	75	Chiara Archam	Hungary	DNF					
	24	Katharina Truppe	Austria	DSQ					
	92	Lidija Simjanovska	Macedonia	DSQ					
