= FIS Alpine World Ski Championships 2011 – Women's giant slalom =

Complete results for Women's giant slalom competition at the 2011 World Championships, run on Thursday, February 17. The eighth race of the championships, its first run was scheduled to start at 10:00 local time (UTC+1), but was delayed two hours due to fog. The second run start time was delayed 90 minutes to 15:00.

A total of 116 athletes from 48 countries competed.

== Results ==
Rank	Bib	Name	Nation	Run 1	Rank	Run 2	Rank	Total	Difference
1st place, gold medalist(s)	1	Tina Maze	Slovenia	1:07.05	1	1:13.49	15	2:20.54	
2nd place, silver medalist(s)	9	Federica Brignone	Italy	1:07.39	2	1:13.24	10	2:20.63	+0.09
3rd place, bronze medalist(s)	3	Tessa Worley	France	1:09.17	19	1:11.85	1	2:21.02	+0.48
4	20	Denise Karbon	Italy	1:08.24	9	1:13.04	7	2:21.28	+0.74
5	6	Viktoria Rebensburg	Germany	1:08.04	6	1:13.38	13	2:21.42	+0.88
6	13	Manuela Mölgg	Italy	1:07.99	5	1:13.44	14	2:21.43	+0.89
7	26	Jessica Lindell-Vikarby	Sweden	1:08.94	14	1:12.61	5	2:21.55	+1.01
8	19	Marlies Schild	Austria	1:09.16	18	1:12.58	4	2:21.74	+1.20
9	16	Anja Pärson	Sweden	1:08.23	8	1:13.52	16	2:21.75	+1.21
10	14	Taïna Barioz	France	1:09.59	23	1:12.20	2	2:21.79	+1.25
10	8	Elisabeth Görgl	Austria	1:07.76	3	1:14.03	25	2:21.79	+1.25
12	5	Kathrin Zettel	Austria	1:08.04	6	1:13.80	21	2:21.84	+1.30
13	2	Tanja Poutiainen	Finland	1:08.59	11	1:13.29	11	2:21.88	+1.34
14	12	Anemone Marmottan	France	1:08.54	10	1:13.80	21	2:22.34	+1.80
15	31	Veronika Zuzulova	Slovakia	1:09.76	25	1:12.81	6	2:22.57	+2.03
16	11	Julia Mancuso	United States	1:08.82	12	1:13.77	20	2:22.59	+2.05
17	27	Sara Hector	Sweden	1:10.37	30	1:12.30	3	2:22.67	+2.13
18	24	Lena Dürr	Germany	1:08.94	14	1:13.75	19	2:22.69	+2.15
19	29	Anne-Sophie Barthet	France	1:09.55	21	1:13.18	9	2:22.73	+2.19
20	17	Lara Gut	Switzerland	1:08.91	13	1:13.92	24	2:22.83	+2.29
21	21	Sarah Schleper	United States	1:09.75	24	1:13.12	8	2:22.87	+2.33
22	10	Maria Pietilä-Holmner	Sweden	1:09.15	17	1:13.87	23	2:23.02	+2.48
23	22	Marie-Michèle Gagnon	Canada	1:09.95	27	1:13.37	12	2:23.32	+2.78
24	25	Marie-Pier Prefontaine	Canada	1:09.91	26	1:13.58	17	2:23.49	+2.95
25	15	Andrea Fischbacher	Austria	1:09.13	16	1:14.40	26	2:23.53	+2.99
26	39	Marusa Ferk	Slovenia	1:10.35	29	1:13.70	18	2:24.05	+3.51
27	23	Irene Curtoni	Italy	1:09.56	22	1:14.50	27	2:24.06	+3.52
28	35	Britt Janyk	Canada	1:10.18	28	1:15.55	32	2:25.73	+5.19
29	41	Wendy Holdener	Switzerland	1:10.63	32	1:15.17	30	2:25.80	+5.26
30	28	Veronika Staber	Germany	1:10.80	33	1:15.16	28	2:25.96	+5.42
31	32	María José Rienda	Spain	1:11.24	37	1:15.13	29	2:26.37	+5.83
32	48	Andrea Jardi	Spain	1:11.03	35	1:15.52	31	2:26.55	+6.01
33	36	Carolina Ruiz Castillo	Spain	1:10.93	34	1:15.98	33	2:26.91	+6.37
34	30	Megan McJames	United States	1:11.13	36	1:16.49	35	2:27.62	+7.08
35	43	Denise Feierabend	Switzerland	1:11.37	38	1:16.61	36	2:27.98	+7.44
36	44	Kristina Saalova	Slovakia	1:12.22	42	1:16.44	34	2:28.66	+8.12
37	51	Katerina Paulathova	Czech Republic	1:12.10	41	1:16.71	38	2:28.81	+8.27
38	52	Jana Gantnerova	Slovakia	1:12.01	39	1:17.29	41	2:29.30	+8.76
39	46	Vladislava Bureeva	Russia	1:12.83	45	1:16.63	37	2:29.46	+8.92
40	37	Mizue Hoshi	Japan	1:10.43	31	1:19.53	53	2:29.96	+9.42
41	34	Emi Hasegawa	Japan	1:12.67	44	1:17.58	43	2:30.25	+9.71
42	62	Žana Novaković	Bosnia and Herzegovina	1:13.05	46	1:17.24	40	2:30.29	+9.75
43	42	Sofija Novoselić	Croatia	1:13.18	48	1:17.40	42	2:30.58	+10.04
44	49	Jana Skvarkova	Slovakia	1:13.63	50	1:17.22	39	2:30.85	+10.31
45	40	María Belén Simari Birkner	Argentina	1:13.14	47	1:17.84	44	2:30.98	+10.44
46	50	Moe Hanaoka	Japan	1:13.20	49	1:18.56	47	2:31.76	+11.22
47	65	Maria Shkanova	Belarus	1:13.86	53	1:18.28	45	2:32.14	+11.60
48	55	Katarzyna Karasinska	Poland	1:13.92	54	1:18.46	46	2:32.38	+11.84
49	59	Daniela Markova	Czech Republic	1:13.78	52	1:18.87	49	2:32.65	+12.11
50	58	Nevena Ignjatović	Serbia	1:14.38	58	1:18.56	47	2:32.94	+12.40
51	80	Maria Kirkova	Bulgaria	1:13.70	51	1:19.56	54	2:33.26	+12.72
52	77	Bogdana Matsotska	Ukraine	1:14.21	56	1:19.18	51	2:33.39	+12.85
53	68	Zsofia Doeme	Hungary	1:14.57	59	1:18.93	50	2:33.50	+12.96
54	56	Anna-Laura Bühler	Liechtenstein	1:14.22	57	1:19.36	52	2:33.58	+13.04
55	67	Martina Dubovska	Czech Republic	1:14.62	60	1:19.95	55	2:34.57	+14.03
	7	Kathrin Hölzl	Germany	1:09.41	20	DNS			
	4	Maria Riesch	Germany	1:07.86	4	DNF			
	38	Rebecca Bühler	Liechtenstein	1:12.03	40	DNF			
	47	Vanessa Schädler	Liechtenstein	1:12.47	43	DNF			
	69	Iris Gudmundsdottir	Iceland	1:13.93	55	DNF			
	45	Tea Palić	Croatia	1:14.73	61	DNQ			
	74	Macarena Simari Birkner	Argentina	1:15.18	62	DNQ			
	72	Lavinia Chrystal	Australia	1:15.35	63	DNQ			
	81	Lelde Gasuna	Latvia	1:15.37	64	DNQ			
	64	Aleksandra Klus	Poland	1:15.41	65	DNQ			
	78	Nino Tsiklauri	Georgia	1:15.54	66	DNQ			
	66	Sarah Jarvis	New Zealand	1:15.94	67	DNQ			
	61	Anna Berecz	Hungary	1:15.95	68	DNQ			
	83	Sandra-Elena Narea	Romania	1:16.67	69	DNQ			
	85	Iulia Petruta Craciun	Romania	1:16.80	70	DNQ			
	82	Isabel van Buynder	Belgium	1:17.06	71	DNQ			
	97	Liene Fimbauere	Latvia	1:17.83	72	DNQ			
	86	Kristina Krone	Puerto Rico	1:17.93	73	DNQ			
	88	Nicole Valcareggi	Greece	1:18.19	74	DNQ			
	100	Sophie Fjellvang-Sølling	Denmark	1:18.37	75	DNQ			
	95	Ornella Oettl Reyes	Peru	1:18.61	76	DNQ			
	73	Xia Lina	China	1:19.12	77	DNQ			
	94	Kseniya Grigoreva	Uzbekistan	1:19.16	78	DNQ			
	87	Tugba Dasdemir	Turkey	1:21.50	79	DNQ			
	92	Malene Madsen	Denmark	1:22.25	80	DNQ			
	84	Liu Yang	China	1:22.80	81	DNQ			
	91	Yom Hirshfeld	Israel	1:22.87	82	DNQ			
	75	Salome Bancora	Argentina	1:23.08	83	DNQ			
	93	Ronnie Kiek-Gedalyahu	Israel	1:23.38	84	DNQ			
	96	Chiara Marano	Brazil	1:24.16	85	DNQ			
	113	Anne Libak Nielsen	Denmark	1:25.08	86	DNQ			
	105	Donata Hellner	Hungary	1:26.97	87	DNQ			
	102	Liu Yu	China	1:27.03	88	DNQ			
	109	Lida Zvoznikova	Kyrgyzstan	1:27.17	89	DNQ			
	103	Szelina Hellner	Hungary	1:27.27	90	DNQ			
	114	Irina Volkova	Kyrgyzstan	1:29.73	91	DNQ			
	106	Svetlana Baranova	Uzbekistan	1:30.62	92	DNQ			
	108	Tatjana Baranova	Uzbekistan	1:31.81	93	DNQ			
	110	Fatemeh Kiadarbandsari	Iran	1:32.16	94	DNQ			
	107	Ziba Kalhor	Iran	1:32.64	95	DNQ			
	104	Paraskevi Mavridou	Greece	1:32.83	96	DNQ			
	99	Marjan Kalhor	Iran	1:34.94	97	DNQ			
	112	Mitra Kalhor	Iran	1:37.93	98	DNQ			
	115	Laura Bauer	South Africa	1:42.19	99	DNQ			
	111	Sarah Ekmekejian	Lebanon	1:42.22	100	DNQ			
	18	Fabienne Suter	Switzerland	DNS					
	98	Maja Klepić	Bosnia and Herzegovina	DNS					
	33	Agniezska Gasienica Daniel	Poland	DNF					
	53	Karolina Chrapek	Poland	DNF					
	54	Mireia Gutierrez	Andorra	DNF					
	57	Brittany Phelan	Canada	DNF					
	60	Tereza Kmochová	Czech Republic	DNF					
	63	Michelle van Herwerden	Netherlands	DNF					
	70	Maya Harrisson	Brazil	DNF					
	71	Elizabeth Pilat	Australia	DNF					
	76	Katrin Kristjansdottir	Iceland	DNF					
	79	Julietta Quiroga	Argentina	DNF					
	89	Evija Benhena	Latvia	DNF					
	90	Qin Xiyue	China	DNF					
	101	Sophia Ralli	Greece	DNF					
	116	Siranush Maghakyan	Armenia	DNF					
