= Alpine skiing at the 2014 Winter Olympics – Women's giant slalom =

Women's giant slalom at the XXII Olympic Winter Games
- Venue: Rosa Khutor Alpine Resort; Krasnaya Polyana, Russia
- Date: 18 February 2014
- Competitors: 90 from 48 nations
- Winning time: 2:36.87

Medalists
1st place, gold medalist(s)		Tina Maze	Slovenia
2nd place, silver medalist(s)		Anna Fenninger	Austria
3rd place, bronze medalist(s)		Viktoria Rebensburg	Germany

The women's giant slalom competition of the Sochi 2014 Olympics was held at the Rosa Khutor Alpine Resort near Krasnaya Polyana, Russia, on Tuesday, 18 February.

== Summary ==
The race was won by Tina Maze of Slovenia, who won silver in 2010 at Vancouver. This was her second Olympic gold in Sochi, following the gold in downhill, and fourth career Olympic medal. The silver was won by Anna Fenninger of Austria, and the defending Olympic champion, Viktoria Rebensburg of Germany, was third. Elisabeth Görgl, who won bronze in Vancouver, finished 11th. Among other competitors, some media attention was directed at Vanessa-Mae of Thailand, the last of the finishers. The London-raised pop violinist was over fifty seconds behind Maze.

Both runs were moved up 90 minutes the day prior in anticipation of deteriorating weather. The starting gate at 1,365 m (4,478 ft) had a varying snow/rain mix with temperatures right around freezing – 0 °C (32 °F) – with rain at the finish and a vertical drop of 400 m (1,312 ft). Maze was first out of the gate and posted the best morning time on the clean course. Mid-course fog briefly delayed the start of the afternoon session as the mix changed to snow at the start. Last on the course, Maze posted the 11th best time in the second run to hold on for the gold, just 0.07 seconds ahead of Fenninger.

== Results ==
The first run was started at 09:30 and the second run at 13:00.

Rank	Bib	Name	Nation	Run 1	Rank	Run 2	Rank	Total	Behind
1st place, gold medalist(s)	1	Tina Maze	Slovenia	1:17.88	1	1:18.99	11	2:36.87	—
2nd place, silver medalist(s)	5	Anna Fenninger	Austria	1:18.73	4	1:18.21	3	2:36.94	+0.07
3rd place, bronze medalist(s)	7	Viktoria Rebensburg	Germany	1:19.24	6	1:17.90	1	2:37.14	+0.27
4	10	Nadia Fanchini	Italy	1:18.53	3	1:18.72	7	2:37.25	+0.38
5	6	Mikaela Shiffrin	United States	1:18.79	5	1:18.58	6	2:37.37	+0.50
6	9	Maria Pietilä-Holmner	Sweden	1:19.45	7	1:18.37	5	2:37.82	+0.95
7	2	Jessica Lindell-Vikarby	Sweden	1:18.40	2	1:19.62	20	2:38.02	+1.15
8	12	Anémone Marmottan	France	1:19.69	9	1:18.79	9	2:38.48	+1.61
9	4	Lara Gut	Switzerland	1:20.54	16	1:18.10	2	2:38.64	+1.77
10	14	Dominique Gisin	Switzerland	1:19.99	11	1:19.59	19	2:39.58	+2.71
11	18	Elisabeth Görgl	Austria	1:19.84	10	1:19.80	22	2:39.64	+2.77
12	22	Michaela Kirchgasser	Austria	1:20.39	13	1:19.42	15	2:39.81	+2.94
13	16	Frida Hansdotter	Sweden	1:20.51	15	1:19.34	14	2:39.85	+2.98
14	24	Anne-Sophie Barthet	France	1:20.71	17	1:19.17	12	2:39.88	+3.01
14	19	Tanja Poutiainen	Finland	1:20.12	12	1:19.76	21	2:39.88	+3.01
16	23	Francesca Marsaglia	Italy	1:21.63	26	1:18.29	4	2:39.92	+3.05
17	20	Nina Løseth	Norway	1:20.78	18	1:19.18	13	2:39.96	+3.09
18	25	Kajsa Kling	Sweden	1:20.47	14	1:19.83	23	2:40.30	+3.43
19	3	Kathrin Zettel	Austria	1:21.60	25	1:18.73	8	2:40.33	+3.46
20	32	Katarina Lavtar	Slovenia	1:21.22	19	1:19.42	15	2:40.64	+3.77
21	36	Erin Mielzynski	Canada	1:21.25	20	1:19.44	18	2:40.69	+3.82
22	28	Adeline Baud	France	1:21.49	22	1:19.42	15	2:40.91	+4.04
23	30	Lotte Smiseth Sejersted	Norway	1:22.49	30	1:18.96	10	2:41.45	+4.58
24	42	Petra Vlhová	Slovakia	1:21.86	27	1:19.83	23	2:41.69	+4.82
25	38	Barbara Wirth	Germany	1:21.35	21	1:20.38	27	2:41.73	+4.86
26	35	Fabienne Suter	Switzerland	1:22.07	28	1:19.99	25	2:42.06	+5.19
27	29	Mona Løseth	Norway	1:21.50	23	1:20.62	28	2:42.12	+5.25
28	43	Nevena Ignjatović	Serbia	1:22.14	29	1:20.32	26	2:42.46	+5.59
29	41	Resi Stiegler	United States	1:22.69	32	1:21.38	29	2:44.07	+7.20
30	33	Megan McJames	United States	1:22.77	33	1:21.60	30	2:44.37	+7.50
31	52	Ilka Štuhec	Slovenia	1:23.03	34	1:21.82	31	2:44.85	+7.98
32	39	Maryna Gąsienica-Daniel	Poland	1:23.18	35	1:22.32	34	2:45.50	+8.63
33	57	Karolina Chrapek	Poland	1:23.89	36	1:21.92	32	2:45.81	+8.94
34	70	Edit Miklós	Hungary	1:24.40	41	1:22.19	33	2:46.59	+9.72
35	56	Andrea Komšić	Croatia	1:24.24	38	1:22.37	35	2:46.61	+9.74
36	59	Maria Kirkova	Bulgaria	1:24.11	37	1:23.48	40	2:47.59	+10.72
37	51	Žana Novaković	Bosnia and Herzegovina	1:24.54	42	1:23.24	38	2:47.78	+10.91
38	47	Barbara Kantorová	Slovakia	1:24.72	43	1:23.09	36	2:47.81	+10.94
39	55	Macarena Simari Birkner	Argentina	1:24.74	44	1:23.11	37	2:47.85	+10.98
40	62	Lavinia Chrystal	Australia	1:25.18	46	1:23.39	39	2:48.57	+11.70
41	45	Greta Small	Australia	1:25.22	47	1:24.44	42	2:49.66	+12.79
42	40	Noelle Barahona	Chile	1:25.02	45	1:24.84	43	2:49.86	+12.99
43	65	Bogdana Matsotska	Ukraine	1:25.25	48	1:25.28	45	2:50.53	+13.66
44	64	Maria Shkanova	Belarus	1:26.79	52	1:23.79	41	2:50.58	+13.71
45	60	Barbora Lukáčová	Slovakia	1:25.59	49	1:25.07	44	2:50.66	+13.79
46	63	Helga María Vilhjálmsdóttir	Iceland	1:26.39	51	1:25.52	46	2:51.91	+15.04
47	48	Salomé Báncora	Argentina	1:25.88	50	1:26.16	47	2:52.04	+15.17
48	66	Anna Berecz	Hungary	1:26.96	53	1:27.09	48	2:54.05	+17.18
49	67	Nino Tsiklauri	Georgia	1:27.27	54	1:28.07	50	2:55.34	+18.47
50	69	Emily Bamford	Australia	1:28.57	56	1:27.23	49	2:55.80	+18.93
51	68	Ania Monica Caill	Romania	1:28.53	55	1:28.73	51	2:57.26	+20.39
52	78	Erla Ásgeirsdóttir	Iceland	1:30.15	57	1:31.51	54	3:01.66	+24.79
53	58	Gim So-hui	South Korea	1:31.47	59	1:30.36	52	3:01.83	+24.96
54	72	Maya Harrisson	Brazil	1:30.31	58	1:31.55	55	3:01.86	+24.99
55	85	Alessia Afi Dipol	Togo	1:31.66	60	1:31.14	53	3:02.80	+25.93
56	74	Jasmine Campbell	Virgin Islands	1:32.05	62	1:33.00	57	3:05.05	+28.18
57	90	Ornella Oettl Reyes	Peru	1:32.87	64	1:33.45	58	3:06.32	+29.45
58	84	Sophia Ralli	Greece	1:33.63	66	1:32.84	56	3:06.47	+29.60
59	79	Camile Dias	Portugal	1:32.70	63	1:34.93	63	3:07.63	+30.76
60	82	Suela Mëhilli	Albania	1:33.55	65	1:34.36	60	3:07.91	+31.04
61	77	Triin Tobi	Estonia	1:34.65	68	1:34.52	61	3:09.17	+32.30
62	86	Kenza Tazi	Morocco	1:35.27	69	1:34.52	61	3:09.79	+32.92
63	89	Tuğba Kocaağa	Turkey	1:36.04	70	1:33.76	59	3:09.80	+32.93
64	80	Kseniya Grigoreva	Uzbekistan	1:34.56	67	1:36.98	65	3:11.54	+34.67
65	81	Élise Pellegrin	Malta	1:36.85	72	1:36.27	64	3:13.12	+36.25
66	71	Xia Lina	China	1:37.03	73	1:38.59	66	3:15.62	+38.75
67	87	Vanessa Vanakorn	Thailand	1:44.86	74	1:42.11	67	3:26.97	+50.10
	15	Denise Karbon	Italy	1:19.49	8	DNF			
	26	Ragnhild Mowinckel	Norway	1:21.50	23	DNF			
	50	Maruša Ferk	Slovenia	1:22.57	31	DNF			
	54	Sofija Novoselić	Croatia	1:24.25	39	DNF			
	44	Maria Bedareva	Russia	1:24.26	40	DNF			
	76	Agnese Āboltiņa	Latvia	1:31.85	61	DNF			
	83	Ieva Januškevičiūtė	Lithuania	1:36.79	71	DNF			
	13	Maria Höfl-Riesch	Germany	DNS					
	8	Marie-Michèle Gagnon	Canada	DNF					
	11	Federica Brignone	Italy	DNF					
	17	Julia Mancuso	United States	DNF					
	21	Marie-Pier Préfontaine	Canada	DNF					
	27	Marion Bertrand	France	DNF					
	31	Wendy Holdener	Switzerland	DNF					
	34	Kateřina Pauláthová	Czech Republic	DNF					
	37	Šárka Strachová	Czech Republic	DNF					
	46	Martina Dubovská	Czech Republic	DNF					
	49	Julietta Quiroga	Argentina	DNF					
	53	Mireia Gutiérrez	Andorra	DNF					
	61	Kristína Saalová	Slovakia	DNF					
	73	Lelde Gasūna	Latvia	DNF					
	75	Florence Bell	Ireland	DNF					
	88	Federica Selva	San Marino	DNF					
