= FIS Alpine World Ski Championships 2019 – Women's giant slalom =

Women's giant slalom at the FIS Alpine World Ski Championships 2019
- Venue: Åre ski resort
- Location: Åre, Sweden
- Dates: 14 February
- Competitors: 98 from 47 nations
- Winning time: 2:01.97

Medalists
gold medal	Petra Vlhová	Slovakia
silver medal	Viktoria Rebensburg	Germany
bronze medal	Mikaela Shiffrin	United States

Women's Giant Slalom
- Location: Åre, Sweden
- Vertical: 340 m (1,115 ft)
- Top elevation: 736 m (2,415 ft)
- Base elevation: 396 m (1,299 ft)

The Women's giant slalom competition at the FIS Alpine World Ski Championships 2019 was held on 14 February. A qualification was scheduled to take place on 11 February, but was cancelled.

Petra Vlhová won the gold, the first-ever for Slovakia at the World Championships. First run leader Viktoria Rebensburg took the silver, and reigning Olympic champion Mikaela Shiffrin settled for bronze; defending champion Tessa Worley was sixth.

== Results ==
Run 1 was started at 14:15, and run 2 at 18:00. Rain preceded the first run, with unseasonable temperatures well above freezing.

Due to high winds, the start was lowered 60 m (197 ft), reducing the vertical drop to 340 m (1,115 ft).

Rank	Bib	Name	Nation	Run 1	Rank	Run 2	Rank	Total	Diff
1st place, gold medalist(s)	4	Petra Vlhová	Slovakia	1:01.10	2	1:00.87	3	2:01.97	
2nd place, silver medalist(s)	3	Viktoria Rebensburg	Germany	1:00.91	1	1:01.20	9	2:02.11	+0.14
3rd place, bronze medalist(s)	2	Mikaela Shiffrin	United States	1:01.35	4	1:01.00	6	2:02.35	+0.38
4	1	Ragnhild Mowinckel	Norway	1:01.28	3	1:01.19	8	2:02.47	+0.50
5	7	Federica Brignone	Italy	1:01.86	7	1:00.98	5	2:02.84	+0.87
6	5	Tessa Worley	France	1:01.64	5	1:01.42	12	2:03.06	+1.09
7	8	Sara Hector	Sweden	1:02.97	15	1:00.94	4	2:03.91	+1.94
8	28	Clara Direz	France	1:03.42	22	1:00.76	2	2:04.18	+2.21
9	21	Coralie Frasse Sombet	France	1:02.56	9	1:01.68	16	2:04.24	+2.27
10	25	Andrea Ellenberger	Switzerland	1:03.05	18	1:01.34	11	2:04.39	+2.42
11	14	Frida Hansdotter	Sweden	1:02.73	12	1:01.67	15	2:04.40	+2.43
12	10	Katharina Liensberger	Austria	1:02.82	14	1:01.64	14	2:04.46	+2.49
13	15	Marta Bassino	Italy	1:02.46	8	1:02.07	24	2:04.53	+2.56
14	35	Ylva Stålnacke	Sweden	1:03.42	22	1:01.16	7	2:04.58	+2.61
15	9	Ricarda Haaser	Austria	1:02.66	10	1:02.01	22	2:04.67	+2.70
15	6	Wendy Holdener	Switzerland	1:02.66	10	1:02.01	22	2:04.67	+2.70
17	38	Alice Robinson	New Zealand	1:04.18	30	1:00.57	1	2:04.75	+2.78
18	18	Thea Louise Stjernesund	Norway	1:02.97	15	1:01.87	20	2:04.84	+2.87
19	30	Marlene Schmotz	Germany	1:03.41	21	1:01.46	13	2:04.87	+2.90
20	13	Kristin Lysdahl	Norway	1:03.04	17	1:01.90	21	2:04.94	+2.97
21	16	Lara Gut-Behrami	Switzerland	1:03.25	19	1:01.79	18	2:05.04	+3.07
22	12	Meta Hrovat	Slovenia	1:02.78	13	1:02.28	26	2:05.06	+3.09
23	19	Marie-Michèle Gagnon	Canada	1:03.36	20	1:01.85	19	2:05.21	+3.24
24	20	Katharina Truppe	Austria	1:03.52	24	1:01.76	17	2:05.28	+3.31
25	29	Romane Miradoli	France	1:04.06	27	1:01.33	10	2:05.39	+3.42
26	26	Mikaela Tommy	Canada	1:03.67	25	1:02.47	27	2:06.14	+4.17
27	34	Asa Ando	Japan	1:04.10	28	1:02.25	25	2:06.35	+4.38
28	31	Nina O'Brien	United States	1:04.33	35	1:02.78	29	2:07.11	+5.14
29	39	Riikka Honkanen	Finland	1:04.72	37	1:02.75	28	2:07.47	+5.50
30	36	Magdalena Fjällström	Sweden	1:04.22	31	1:03.28	30	2:07.50	+5.53
31	47	Ana Bucik	Slovenia	1:04.30	33	1:03.35	31	2:07.65	+5.68
32	27	Maryna Gąsienica-Daniel	Poland	1:04.34	36	1:03.83	35	2:08.17	+6.20
33	33	Adriana Jelinkova	Netherlands	1:04.31	34	1:04.06	37	2:08.37	+6.40
34	45	Neja Dvornik	Slovenia	1:04.98	39	1:03.74	33	2:08.72	+6.75
35	55	Ekaterina Tkachenko	Russia	1:05.61	41	1:03.68	32	2:09.29	+7.32
36	49	Núria Pau	Spain	1:05.66	42	1:03.76	34	2:09.42	+7.45
37	42	Gabriela Capová	Czech Republic	1:05.67	43	1:03.92	36	2:09.59	+7.62
38	43	Erika Pykäläinen	Finland	1:05.28	40	1:04.52	39	2:09.80	+7.83
39	32	Nevena Ignjatović	Serbia	1:05.81	44	1:04.15	38	2:09.96	+7.99
40	48	Andrea Komšić	Croatia	1:06.29	45	1:05.05	41	2:11.34	+9.37
41	51	Francesca Baruzzi Farriol	Argentina	1:06.56	47	1:04.91	40	2:11.47	+9.50
42	50	Sarah Schleper	Mexico	1:06.64	48	1:05.59	42	2:12.23	+10.26
43	41	Aleksandra Prokopyeva	Russia	1:06.71	49	1:05.73	43	2:12.44	+10.47
44	46	Nicol Gastaldi	Argentina	1:07.44	50	1:06.51	46	2:13.95	+11.98
45	53	Lelde Gasūna	Latvia	1:07.52	51	1:06.47	45	2:13.99	+12.02
46	56	Eliza Grigg	New Zealand	1:07.74	54	1:06.30	44	2:14.04	+12.07
47	59	Kim Vanreusel	Belgium	1:07.73	53	1:06.85	48	2:14.58	+12.61
48	52	Maria Shkanova	Belarus	1:07.70	52	1:07.10	49	2:14.80	+12.83
49	63	Hólmfríður Dóra Friðgeirsdóttir	Iceland	1:08.61	56	1:06.80	47	2:15.41	+13.44
50	57	Mialitiana Clerc	Madagascar	1:08.37	55	1:08.09	52	2:16.46	+14.49
51	66	Evelīna Gasūna	Latvia	1:09.16	57	1:07.56	51	2:16.72	+14.75
52	58	Nino Tsiklauri	Georgia	1:09.53	58	1:07.27	50	2:16.80	+14.83
53	62	Freydís Halla Einarsdóttir	Iceland	1:10.08	59	1:08.67	53	2:18.75	+16.78
54	60	Tess Arbez	Ireland	1:10.23	60	1:09.84	54	2:20.07	+18.10
—	37	Piera Hudson	New Zealand	1:04.87	38	Did not finish			
—	24	Alexandra Tilley	Great Britain	1:03.87	26	Did not finish			
—	23	Francesca Marsaglia	Italy	1:04.12	29	Did not finish			
—	22	Kristine Gjelsten Haugen	Norway	1:04.25	32	Did not finish			
—	17	Sofia Goggia	Italy	1:01.82	6	Did not finish			
—	40	Paula Moltzan	United States	1:06.36	46	Did not start			
—	64	Olha Knysh	Ukraine	1:10.28	61	Did not qualify			
—	70	Liene Bondare	Latvia	1:10.74	62	Did not qualify			
—	79	Šejla Merdanović	Bosnia and Herzegovina	1:10.87	63	Did not qualify			
—	61	Agnese Āboltiņa	Latvia	1:11.09	64	Did not qualify			
—	67	Vanina Guerillot	Portugal	1:11.29	65	Did not qualify			
—	78	Maja Tadić	Bosnia and Herzegovina	1:11.64	66	Did not qualify			
—	73	María Finnbogadóttir	Iceland	1:11.65	67	Did not qualify			
—	72	Nuunu Berthelsen	Denmark	1:11.77	68	Did not qualify			
—	71	Andrea Björk Birkisdóttir	Iceland	1:12.31	69	Did not qualify			
—	69	Anastasiya Shepilenko	Ukraine	1:13.19	70	Did not qualify			
—	74	Élise Pellegrin	Malta	1:13.23	71	Did not qualify			
—	68	Kong Fanying	China	1:13.25	72	Did not qualify			
—	75	Mariya Grigorova	Kazakhstan	1:14.08	73	Did not qualify			
—	65	Ni Yueming	China	1:14.55	74	Did not qualify			
—	83	Aristi Kyritsi	Greece	1:15.00	75	Did not qualify			
—	81	Sophia Ralli	Greece	1:15.54	76	Did not qualify			
—	80	Zhang Yuying	China	1:15.77	77	Did not qualify			
—	76	Liu Yang	China	1:15.98	78	Did not qualify			
—	84	Katalin Dorultán	Hungary	1:16.35	79	Did not qualify			
—	93	Carlie Iskandar	Lebanon	1:17.39	80	Did not qualify			
—	82	Ornella Oettl Reyes	Peru	1:17.66	81	Did not qualify			
—	87	Sadaf Saveh-Shemshaki	Iran	1:17.67	82	Did not qualify			
—	92	Jackie Chamoun	Lebanon	1:18.23	83	Did not qualify			
—	95	Sara Zeidan	Lebanon	1:18.89	84	Did not qualify			
—	85	Anastasia Mantsiou	Greece	1:20.25	85	Did not qualify			
—	96	Andriani Pieri	Cyprus	1:23.25	86	Did not qualify			
—	97	Adea Kollqaku	Kosovo	1:26.39	87	Did not qualify			
—	98	Celine Marti	Haiti	1:34.19	88	Did not qualify			
—	94	Silouani Kostits	Greece	Did not finish					
—	91	Fiona Rusta	Kosovo	Did not finish					
—	89	Manon Ouaiss	Lebanon	Did not finish					
—	77	Suela Mëhilli	Albania	Did not finish					
—	54	Jessica Anderson	Great Britain	Did not finish					
—	44	Kateřina Pauláthová	Czech Republic	Did not finish					
—	11	Bernadette Schild	Austria	Did not finish					
—	90	Forough Abbasi	Iran	Disqualified					
—	88	Mitra Kalhor	Iran	Disqualified					
—	86	Atefeh Ahmadi	Iran	Disqualified					
