= Anna Veith =

Austrian alpine skier

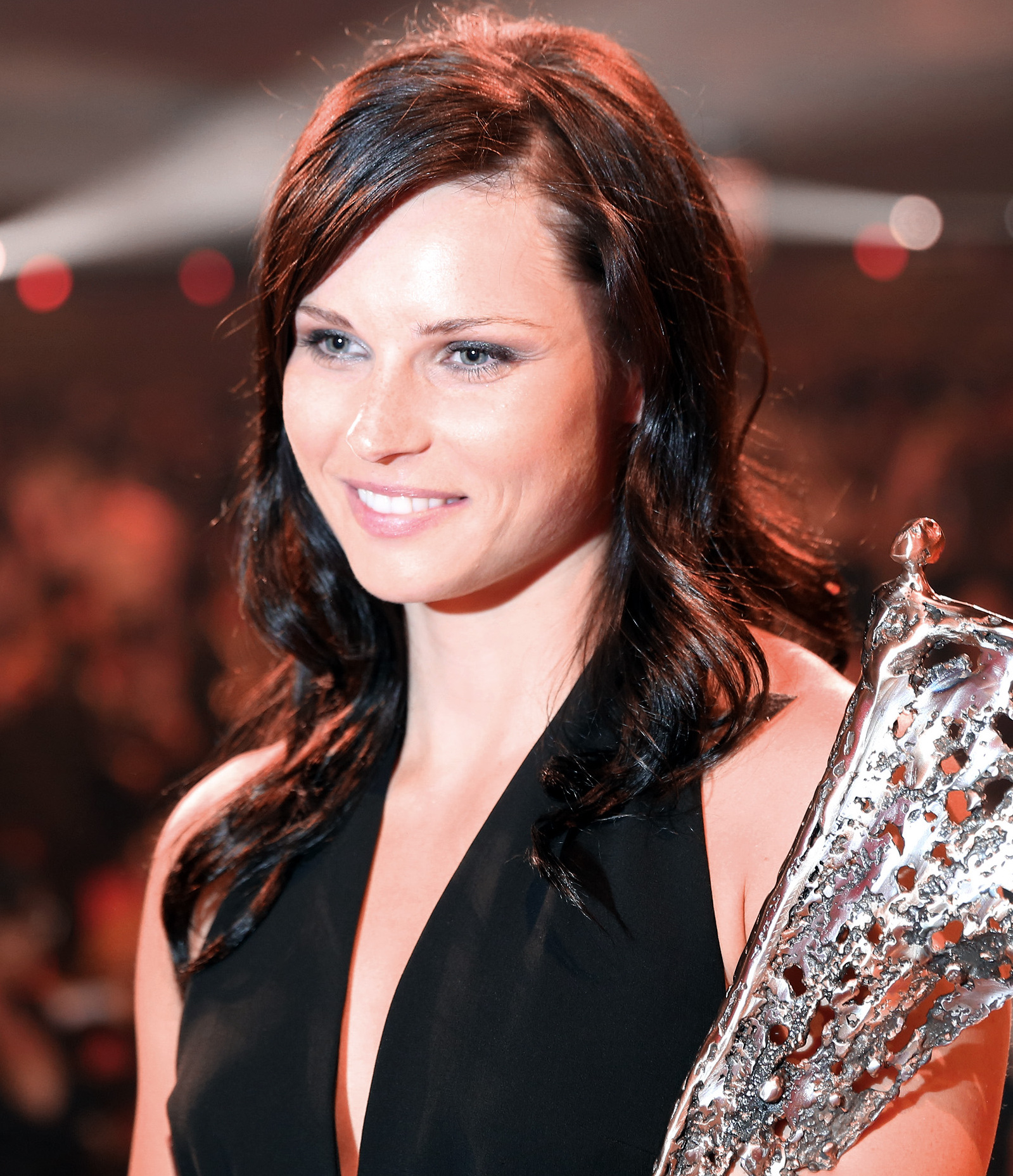
- Veith in 2014

Personal information
- Born: 18 June 1989 (age 37) Hallein, Salzburg, Austria
- Height: 1.66 m (5 ft 5 in)
- Website: anna-veith.com

Skiing career
- Sport: Alpine skiing
- Club: Skiklub Hypo Hallein
- Retired: May 2020
- Disciplines: Giant slalom, super-G, Downhill, combined
- World Cup debut: 11 November 2006 (age 17)

Olympics
- Teams: 3 – (2010, 2014, 2018)
- Medals: 3 (1 gold)

World Championships
- Teams: 5 – (2009–2017)
- Medals: 5 (3 gold)

World Cup
- Seasons: 13 – (2007–2015, 2017–2020)
- Wins: 15 – (11 GS, 3 SG, 1 AC)
- Podiums: 45
- Overall titles: 2 – (2014, 2015)
- Discipline titles: 3 – (GS: 2014, 2015 & AC: 2015)
Medal record
Women's alpine skiing
Representing Austria
International alpine ski competitions
Event	1st	2nd	3rd
Olympic Games	1	2	0
World Championships	3	2	1
Junior World Championships	3	2	1
Total	7	6	2
Olympic Games
Gold medal – first place	2014 Sochi	Super-G
Silver medal – second place	2014 Sochi	Giant slalom
Silver medal – second place	2018 Pyeongchang	Super-G
World Championships
Gold medal – first place	2011 Garmisch-Partenkirchen	Combined
Gold medal – first place	2015 Beaver Creek	Super-G
Gold medal – first place	2015 Beaver Creek	Giant slalom
Silver medal – second place	2011 Garmisch-Partenkirchen	Team event
Silver medal – second place	2015 Beaver Creek	Downhill
Bronze medal – third place	2013 Schladming	Giant slalom
Junior World Ski Championships
Gold medal – first place	2006 Le Massif	Super-G
Gold medal – first place	2008 Formigal	Giant slalom
Gold medal – first place	2008 Formigal	Combined
Silver medal – second place	2006 Le Massif	Downhill
Silver medal – second place	2008 Formigal	Super-G
Bronze medal – third place	2009 Garmisch-Partenkirchen	Super-G

Anna Veith (née Fenninger; born 18 June 1989) is an Austrian former alpine ski racer and Olympic gold medalist. She was the overall World Cup champion for the 2014 and 2015 seasons.

Born in Hallein, Veith is from the village of Adnet in Salzburg and made her World Cup debut at age 17 in November 2006. She competed in all five alpine disciplines, but omitted slalom as of January 2012. Her major breakthrough came when she successfully became world champion in the super combined alpine event in 2011, without having won a World Cup race before. At the 2014 Winter Olympics held in Sochi, Veith won the super-G at Rosa Khutor for her first Olympic medal, and at the end of the season she won the World Cup overall and giant slalom titles.

== Ski racing ==
=== 2006–2010: World Cup Debut and first success ===
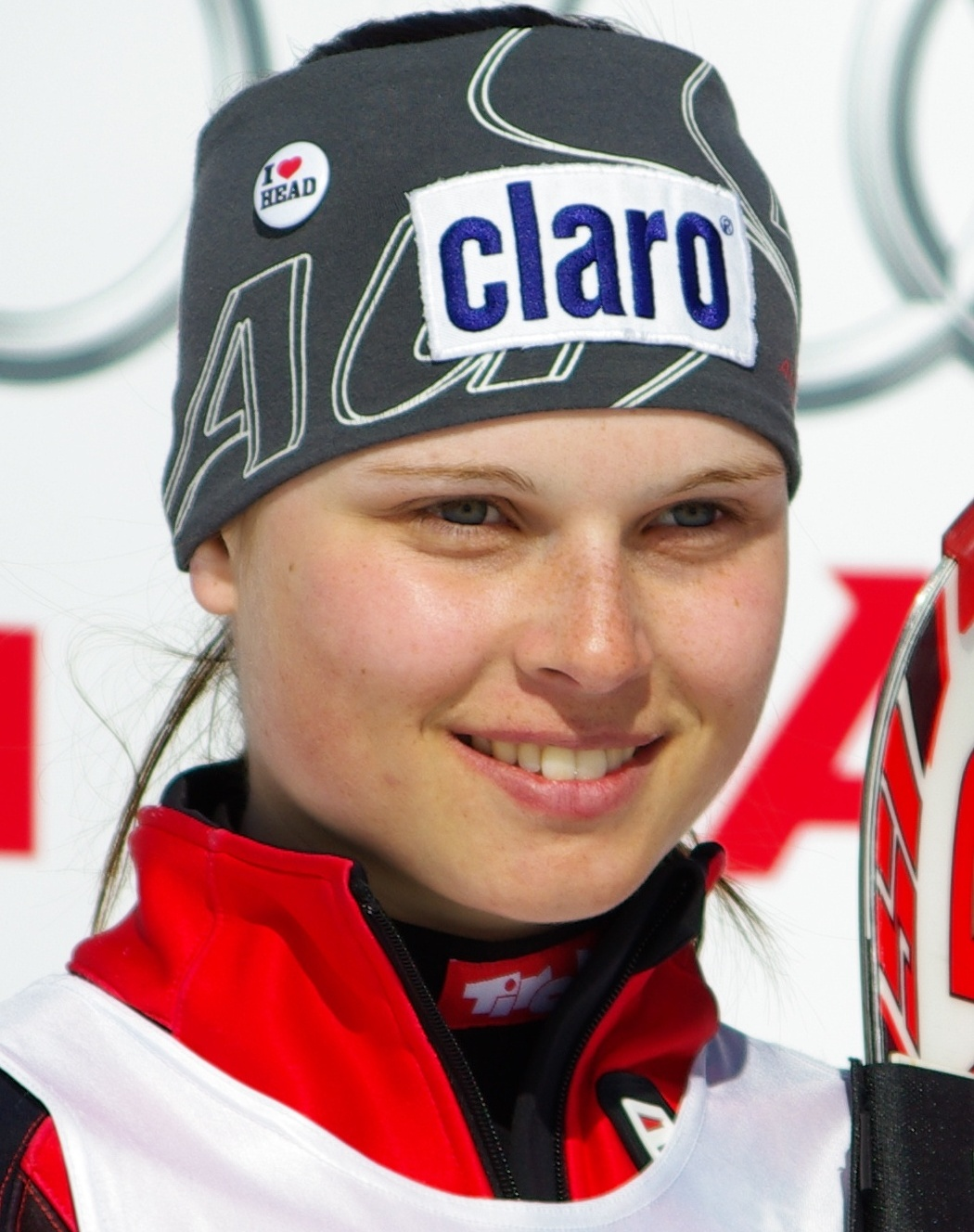
Veith in March 2008

In the 2006 Junior World Championships, Veith (née Fenninger) won the gold in the super-G, silver in the downhill, and finished fifth in the slalom.

On 11 November 2006, Veith made her World Cup debut in the slalom at Levi, Finland. She tallied her first World Cup points (top 30) on 21 January 2007 in Cortina d'Ampezzo, where she finished 16th in the giant slalom.

After another top 20 placing, she improved again on 22 December 2007 in St. Anton, where she received her best result of fourth in the super combined. At the 2008 Junior World Championships, Veith won gold in the giant slalom and silver in both combined and downhill.

In the 2009 season she achieved six top 10 placings, with her greatest success being a second place in the super-G event in Cortina d'Ampezzo on 26 January 2009. At the World Championships in Val-d'Isère Veith became 4th and 7th in the super-G and the super combined events, respectively. She won the bronze medal in the super-G event at the 2009 Junior World Championships in Garmisch-Partenkirchen.

In the next season, Veith had three top 10 finishes. At the 2010 Winter Olympics she placed 16th in the super-G and the super combined events, and 25th in the downhill.

=== 2011: World Champion ===
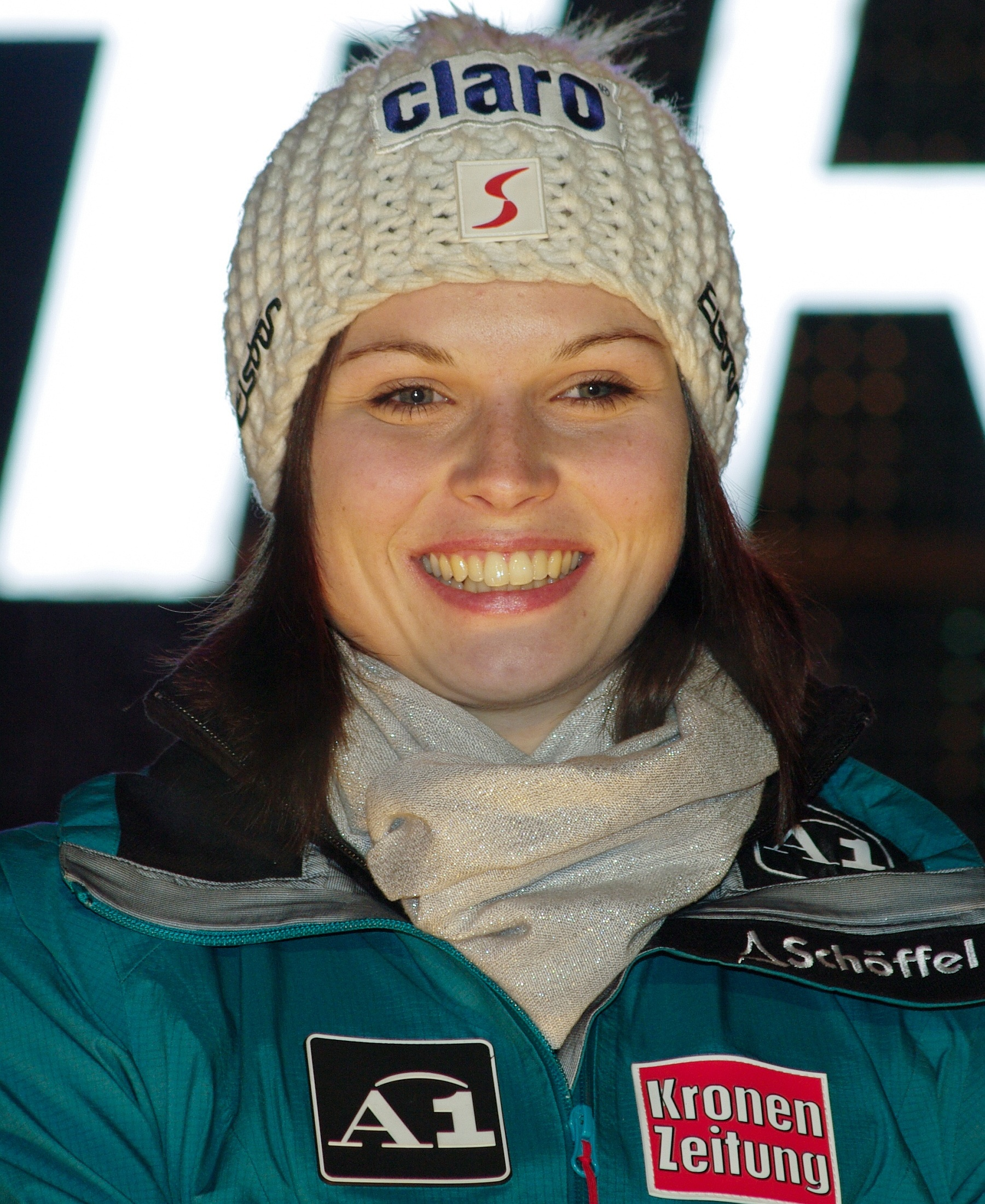
Veith after reaching first ever World Cup podium in Altenmarkt-Zauchensee in January 2011

The 2011 season was a very successful season for Veith. She had twelve World Cup top ten finishes, which included two podiums, and finished 12th in the overall standings. She was 6th in the season's downhill standings, and 7th in the super-G. At the 2011 World Championships in Garmisch-Partenkirchen, Veith won gold in the super combined and silver in the team event, together with Romed Baumann, Michaela Kirchgasser, Benjamin Raich, Marlies Schild and Philipp Schörghofer. She completed the season by winning the gold medal in the super-G at the Austrian Championships in late March.

=== 2012–2013: first World Cup victories, bronze medal in Schladming ===
In late December 2011, Veith won her first World Cup event in Lienz, Austria, in the giant slalom. Her most consistent World Cup podium results have been in the super-G. After another giant slalom win in Austria in December 2012, Veith's first super-G victory came in March 2013 in Germany.

At the 2013 World Championships in Schladming, Austria, Veith won bronze in the giant slalom.

In the alpine skiing World Cup overall ranking 2013 she finished third behind Tina Maze and Maria Höfl-Riesch.

=== 2014: Sochi Olympics and World Cup overall title ===
The 2014 season was Veith's most successful season so far. At the 2014 Winter Olympics in Sochi, Russia, Veith won the super-G at Rosa Khutor for her first Olympic medal, winning by over a half-second. Three days later, she won a silver medal in the giant slalom, just .02 seconds behind gold medalist and World Cup rival Tina Maze of Slovenia. The Giant slalom was held in the rain.

In the next three races after the Olympics, Veith had a runner-up finish and two wins, which gave her 280 more points and temporary lead over Höfl-Riesch. in the World Cup overall standings. Höfl-Riesch. regained the lead after the slalom at Åre, but was injured in the downhill at the World Cup finals in Lenzerheide. The next day, Veith secured her first World Cup overall title with a runner-up finish in the super-G. She won the season-ending giant slalom to clinch the crystal globe for that discipline as well. Veith was runner-up for the season in both speed events, downhill and super-G and finished with four World Cup victories and eleven podiums. Including the Olympics, she had five wins and thirteen podiums during the 2014 season.

=== 2015: World Championships and World Cup titles ===
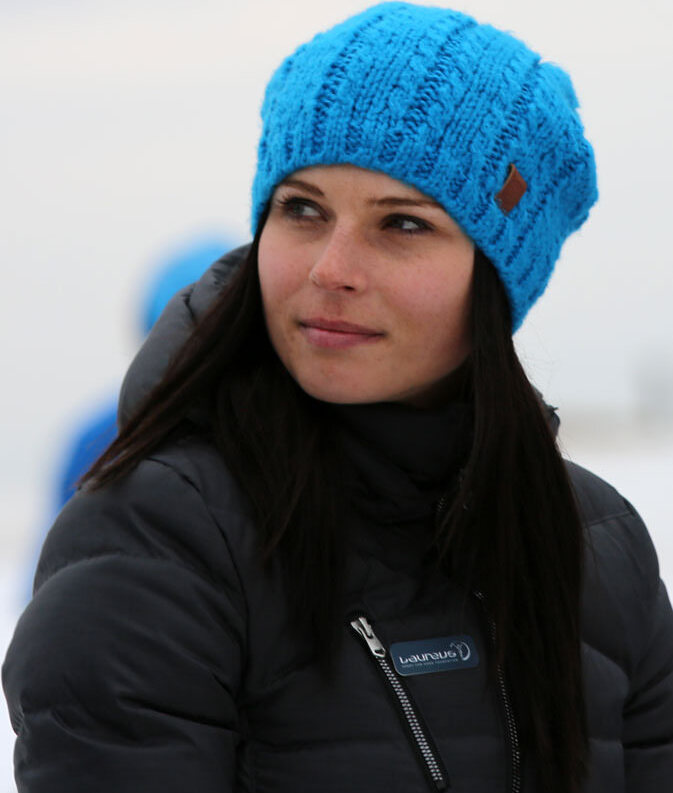
Veith in March 2015

Veith had her most successful World Championships to date winning gold medals in the Super-G and GS and a silver in the downhill. Following the World Championships she continued her form in the World Cup. On 19 January she had trailed Tina Maze by 361 points in the overall. On 13 March she briefly overtook Maze in the standings with a dominant win in the GS in Åre, to take her ninth straight World Cup podium and fifth victory of the season. It was the first time she had led the overall since winning the first race of the season: the GS in Sölden. Only five races remained. The overall and GS titles would go to the last run of the last race of the season: the GS in Meribel. Veith was then trailing Maze by 18 points in the overall and had an 86-point lead over teammate Eva Maria Brem in the GS standings. Veith took a win, and with it the GS and overall titles.

Three days before the opening race of the 2015–16 season (Giant slalom at Sölden in October) Veith fell in a training run there. She suffered severe tears to both her ACL and meniscus, causing her to miss the entire season, as well as the majority of the next. Veith's first World Cup event after the injury was a giant slalom at Semmering on 27 December 2016, but she didn't qualify for the second leg. The next day, she was 25th in another GS at Semmering. Her best result on the World Cup was a third place in the Super-G on 29 January at Cortina, shortly before the World Championships. However, Veith wasn't able to duplicate her success (giant slalom (22nd) and super-G (DNF)), then withdrew from the remainder of the World Cup season, citing lingering injuries that needed to be dealt with in order for her to continue in her career.

In January 2016 she announced former tennis player Florian Krumrey as her new manager.

=== 2018: Pyeongchang Olympics ===
Veith attempted to defend her 2014 Super-G gold medal, ultimately winning the silver medal in PyeongChang behind Czech skier Ester Ledecká in a major upset.

=== 2019: Another injury ===
On 12 January 2019 she suffered another cruciate ligament tear during training in Pozza di Fassa (Trentino), although she had not even fallen. She had to cancel the season and thereby also missed the World Championships.

=== Retirement ===
Veith announced her retirement from the sport on 13 May 2020.

== Conservation efforts ==
Veith supports the non-profit organisation Cheetah Conservation Fund (CCF), whose mission is to be the world's resource charged with protecting the cheetahs and ultimately ensuring its future on our planet. Her racehelmet has a cheetah design, and as an ambassador of this organisation she was publishing several videos and photographs with herself in cheetah design, with the aim of raising awareness that they are almost extinct.

From 2013 to 2015, Veith was also a partner of the Austrian non-profit organisation Build an Ark - engaged in wildlife conservation for many years - in order to create a long-term effect for the Cheetah project. The cooperation of a top-athlete and a wildlife conservation association, themed "top-class sports meets wildlife conservation" was intended to raise awareness of the cheetah's plight and of society's role in its long-term survival.

== Personal life ==
She was born in Hallein, Austria, to parents Peter and Martina Fenninger, and later settled in Salzburg. On 16 April 2016, she married her longtime boyfriend, former snowboarder Manuel Veith. In February 2021 Veith announced that the couple is expecting their first child together.

In early November 2016 she published her autobiography, Zwischenzeit ("meantime"). The book primarily covers her career through the years and her experience of being unable to compete due to a prolonged injury.

== World Cup results ==
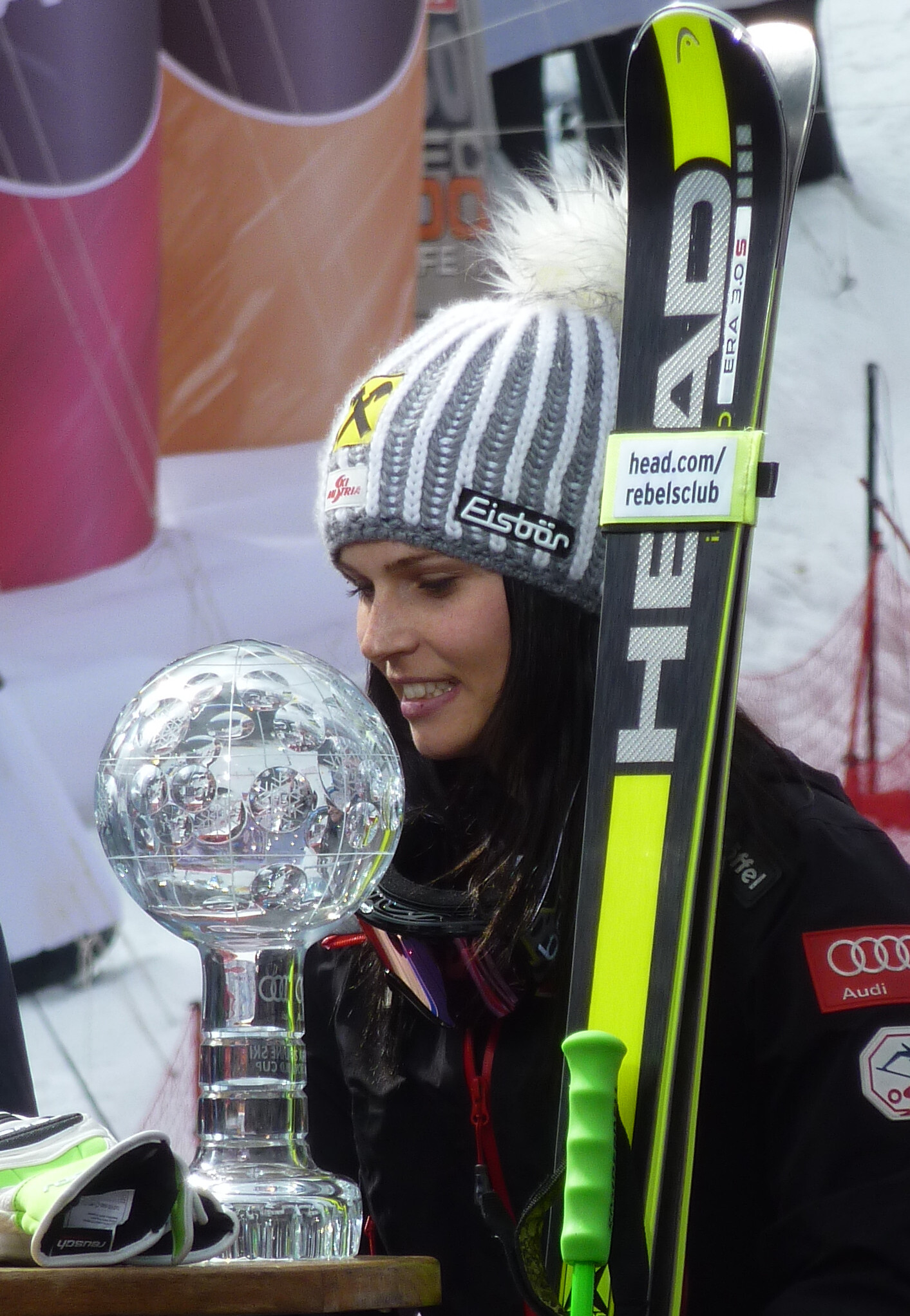
Veith winning her second World Cup overall crystal globe in 2015

=== Season titles ===
- 4 titles – (2 overall, 2 Giant slalom) + 1 Combined (unofficial)

Season
Season	Discipline
2014	Overall
2014	Giant slalom
2015	Overall
2015	Giant slalom
2015	Combined ^{A}

^{A} Unofficial, combined was not awarded from seasons 2013 to 2015.

=== Season standings ===
Season
Season	Age	Overall	Slalom	Giant; Slalom	Super-G	Downhill	Combined
2007	17	108	—	40	—	—	—
2008	18	60	—	52	32	—	14
2009	19	20	39	52	15	21	7
2010	20	26	—	—	13	26	6
2011	21	12	59	33	7	6	9
2012	22	5	54	4	3	19	8
2013	23	3	—	2	3	8	13
2014	24	1	—	1	2	2	8
2015	25	1	—	1	2	2	1
2016	26	knee injury in October: out for season					
2017	27	74	—	48	26	45	—
2018	28	15	—	33	3	12	—
2019	29	39	—	18	26	34	—

=== Race victories ===
- 15 wins – (11 GS, 3 SG, 1 AC)
- 45 podiums – (15 GS, 21 SG, 8 DH, 1 AC)

Season
Season	Date	Location	Discipline
2012	28 Dec 2011	Lienz, Austria	Giant slalom
2013	28 Dec 2012	Semmering, Austria	Giant slalom
2013	3 Mar 2013	Garmsich-Partenkirchen, Germany	Super-G
2013	9 Mar 2013	Ofterschwang, Germany	Giant slalom
2014	28 Dec 2013	Lienz, Austria	Giant slalom
2014	6 Mar 2014	Åre, Sweden	Giant slalom
2014	7 Mar 2014	Åre, Sweden	Giant slalom
2014	16 Mar 2014	Lenzerheide, Switzerland	Giant slalom
2015	25 Oct 2014	Sölden, Austria	Giant slalom
2015	21 Feb 2015	Maribor, Slovenia	Giant slalom
2015	1 Mar 2015	Bansko, Bulgaria	Super combined
2015	2 Mar 2015	Bansko, Bulgaria	Super-G
2015	13 Mar 2015	Åre, Sweden	Giant slalom
2015	22 Mar 2015	Méribel, France	Giant slalom
2018	17 Dec 2017	Val d'Isere, France	Super-G

== World Championship results ==
Year
Year	Age	Slalom	Giant; Slalom	Super-G	Downhill	Combined
2009	19	32	—	4	DNF	7
2011	21	—	—	5	17	1
2013	23	—	3	DNF	11	DNF2
2015	25	—	1	1	2	4
2017	27	—	22	DNF	—	—

== Olympic results ==
Year
Year	Age	Slalom	Giant; Slalom	Super-G	Downhill	Combined
2010	20	—	—	16	25	16
2014	24	—	2	1	DNF	8
2018	28	—	12	2	—	—

== Awards ==
- Austrian Sportswoman of the Year, Newcomer of the Year — 2011
- Austrian Sportswoman of the Year — 2013, 2014, 2015
- Skieur d'Or — 2014, 2015
- Laureus Award, Sportswoman of the Year — 2015 (Nominated)
- Women's Sports Foundation, Sportswoman of the Year — 2015 (Nominated)
- Polish Press Agency, European Sportswoman of the Year — 2015 (Nominated)
- Grand Decoration of Honour for Services to the Republic of Austria — 2016
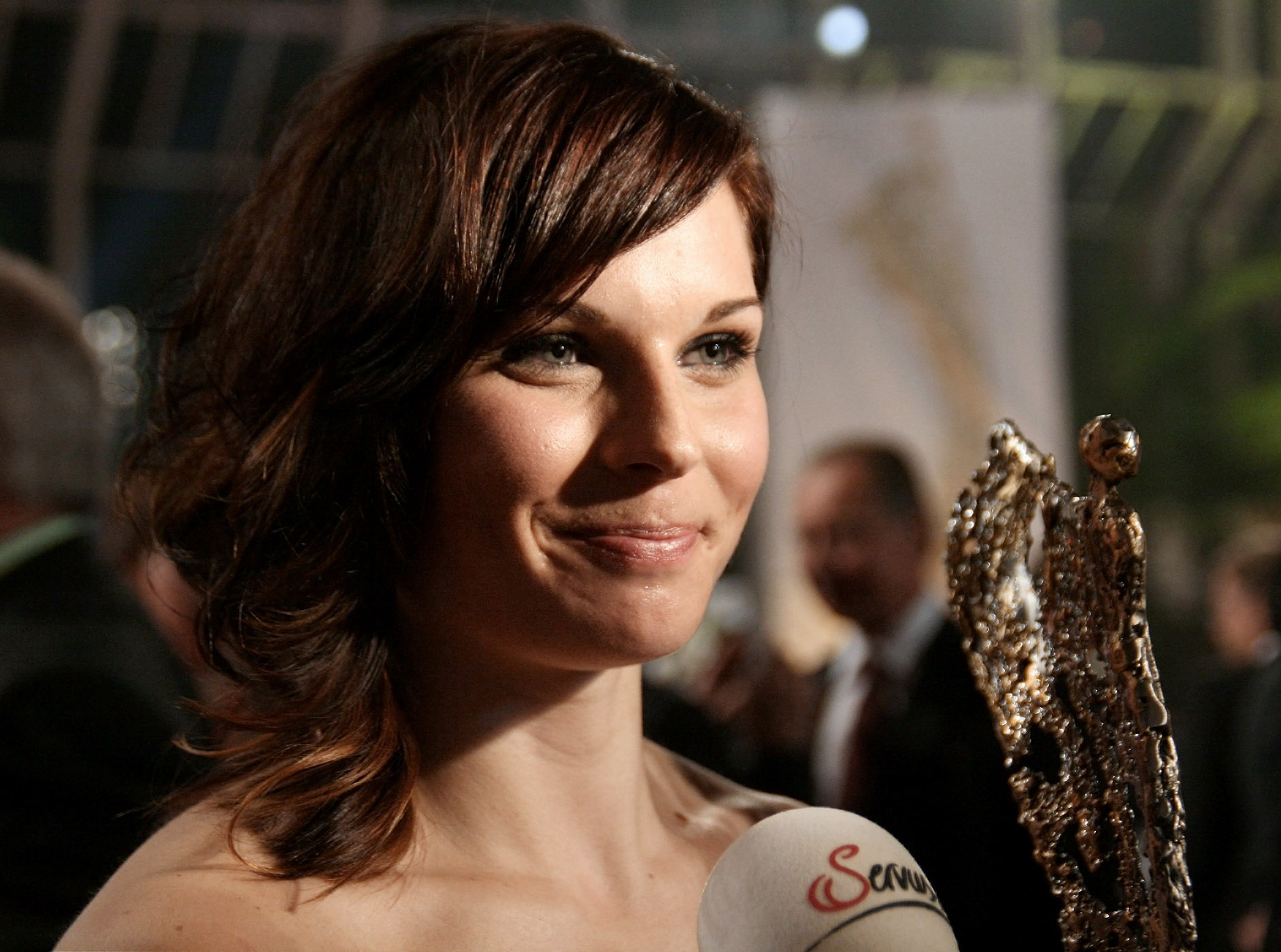
Veith receiving "Newcomer of the Year" Award in November 2011

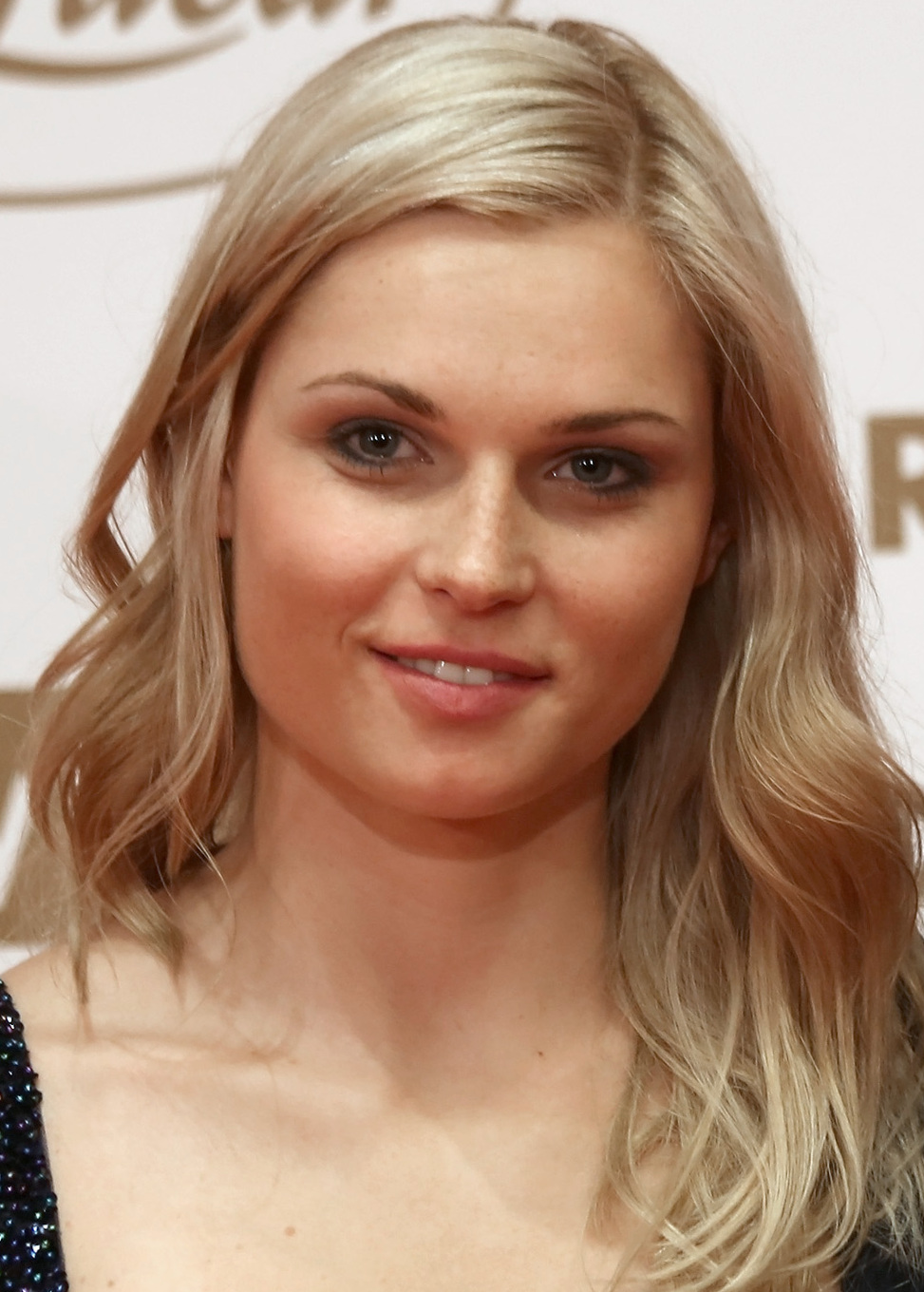
Veith at the 2013 Austrian Sports Personality of the Year Gala where she voted as the "Sporstwoman of the Year"

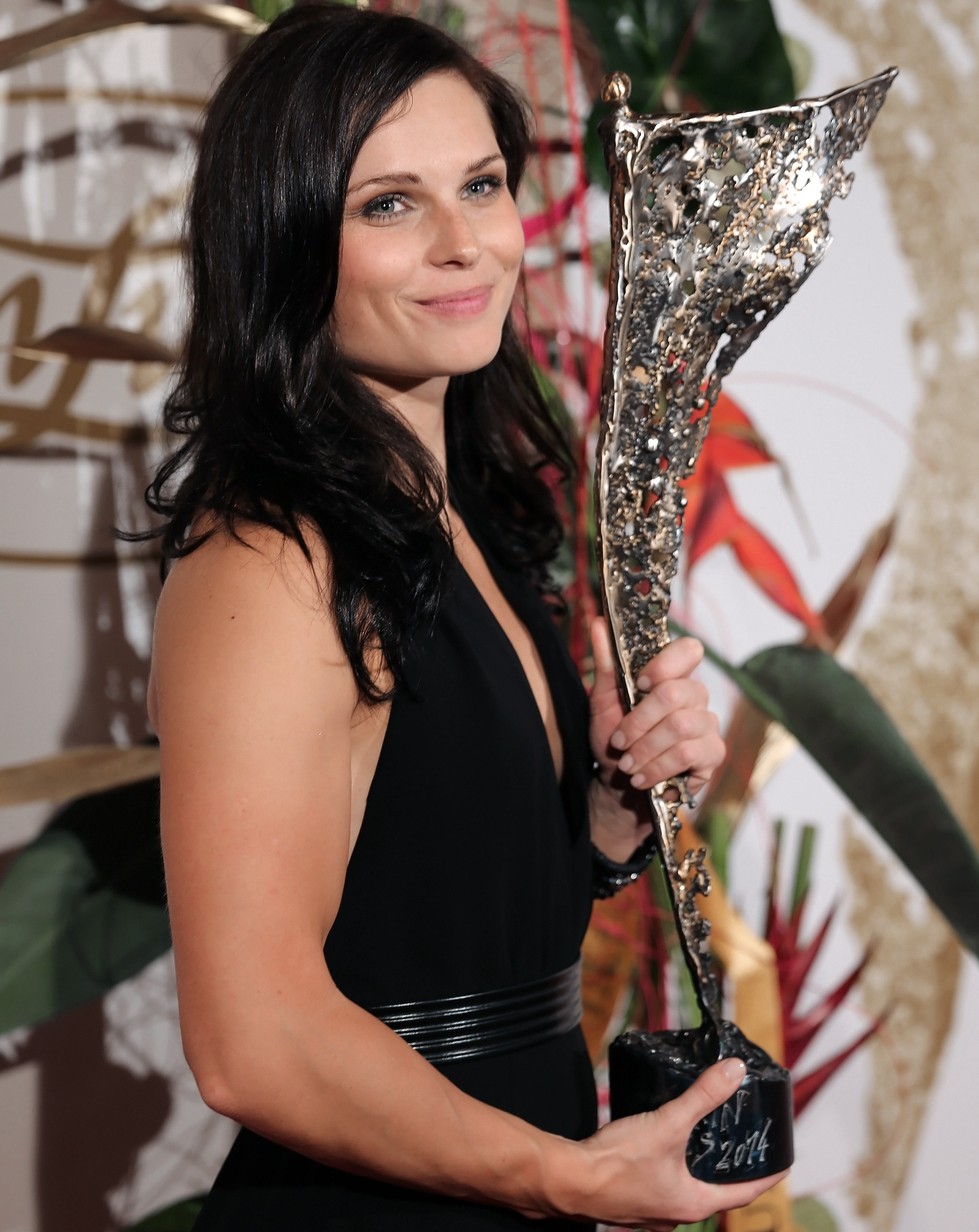
Veith with her second consecutive "Sportswoman of the Year" Award in 2014. She won the award for the third time in 2015.

Awards
Preceded by Marlies Schild	Austrian Sportswoman of the year 2013 – 2015	Succeeded by Eva-Maria Brem
Olympic Games
Preceded by Mario Stecher	Flagbearer for Austria; Pyeongchang 2018	Succeeded by Incumbent
