= Greta Small =

Australian alpine skier (born 1995)

Personal information
- Citizenship: Australian
- Born: 16 October 1995 (age 30) Wangaratta, Victoria, Australia
- Occupation: Alpine skier
- Height: 171 cm (5 ft 7 in)
- Weight: 70 kg (154 lb)

Sport
- Country: Australia
- Sport: Alpine skiing
- Rank: 19
- Partner: Atomic
- Coached by: Boyd Small

Achievements and titles
- Highest world ranking: 19
- Personal best: SC 5.92 points
- Updated on 11 February 2014

Greta Small (born 16 October 1995) is an Australian alpine ski racer. She started skiing at Mt Hotham with the Mount Hotham Racing Squad; her main training base now is in the Tyrol region in Austria where she trains with Race Centre Benni Raich. Her first major international appearance was at the Innsbruck 2012 Youth Olympic Games. In Small's first senior World championships she placed 25th in the Super Combined at 17 years of age. The 2013–14 Northern Hemisphere winter was a first of many things for Small. She competed at the Solden opening World Cup Giant Slalom followed by three World Cup events in Beaver Creek, Colorado, and the 2014 Winter Olympics in Sochi, Russia. Small placed 15th in the Alpine Combined which was Australia's best placing for 12 years and she was the second-youngest in the field by 8 days.

At the end of the 2015 season whilst racing in Japan, Small tore her ACL.

== World Cup results ==
=== Season standings ===
Season
Season	Age	Overall	Slalom	Giant; Slalom	Super G	Downhill	Combined
2015	19	110	—	—	—	—	25
2019	23	117	—	—	—	—	22

Standings through 5 February 2023

== World Championship results ==
Year
Year	Age	Slalom	Giant; Slalom	Super G	Downhill	Combined
2013	17	45	45	–	33	25
2015	19	DNS2	36	29	33	18
2019	23	—	—	25	30	20
2021	25	—	—	37	28	15
2023	27	—	—	27	24	16

== Olympic results ==
Year
Year	Age	Slalom	Giant; Slalom	Super G	Downhill	Combined
2014	18	31	41	DNF	29	15
2018	22	—	—	31	20	DNF
2022	26	—	—	—	26	13
