= Martina Dubovská =

Czech alpine skier (born 1992)

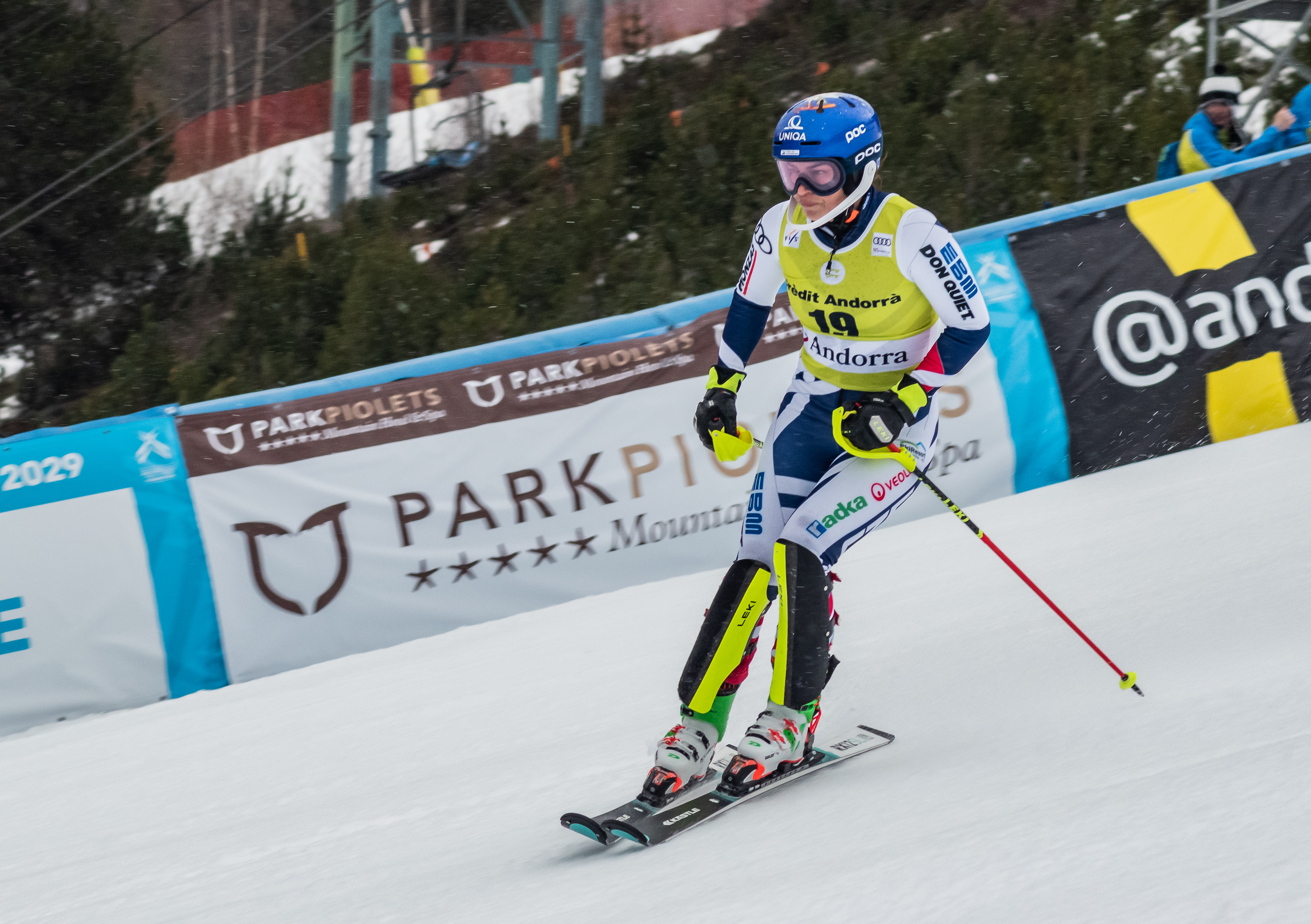
- Dubovska in 2023

Personal information
- Born: 27 February 1992 (age 34) Třinec, Czechoslovakia
- Height: 1.74 m (5 ft 9 in)

Skiing career
- Country: Czech Republic
- Sport: Alpine skiing
- Club: SK Spindl, Špindlerův Mlýn
- Disciplines: Slalom
- World Cup debut: 4 February 2011 (age 18)

Olympics
- Teams: 4 – (2014–2026)
- Medals: 0

World Championships
- Teams: 7 – (2011–2019, 2023–2025)
- Medals: 0

World Cup
- Seasons: 16 – (2011–2026)
- Podiums: 0
- Overall titles: 0 – (36th in 2021)
- Discipline titles: 0 – (10th in SL, 2021)
Medal record
Women's alpine skiing
Representing the Czech Republic

Martina Dubovská (born 27 February 1992) is a Czech alpine ski racer. She has competed at four Winter Olympics and seven world championships.

== World Cup results ==
=== Season standings ===
Season
Season	Age	Overall	Slalom	Giant slalom	Super-G	Downhill	Combined	Parallel
2014	21	117	52	—	—	—	—	—N/a
2015	22	104	46	—	—	—	—	—N/a
2016	23	108	50	—	—	—	—	—N/a
2017	24	97	39	—	—	—	—	—N/a
2018	25	119	54	—	—	—	—	—N/a
2019	26	120	52	—	—	—	—	—N/a
2020	27	84	32	—	—	—	—	39
2021	28	36	10	—	—	—	—N/a	—
2022	29	57	17	—	—	—	—N/a	—
2023	30	47	15	—	—	—	—N/a	—N/a
2024	31	62	23	—	—	—	—N/a	—N/a
2025	32	84	32	—	—	—	—N/a	—N/a
2026	33	111	46	—	—	—	—N/a	—N/a

Standings through 18 February 2026

=== Top ten results ===
- 0 podiums, 8 top tens (8 SL)

Season
Season	Date	Location	Discipline	Place
2020	23 Nov 2019	Levi, Finland	Slalom	9th
2021	22 Nov 2020	Levi, Finland	Slalom	10th
2021	6 Mar 2021	Jasná, Slovakia	Slalom	8th
2021	20 Mar 2021	Lenzerheide, Switzerland	Slalom	9th
2022	21 Nov 2021	Levi, Finland	Slalom	6th
2023	11 Dec 2022	Sestriere, Italy	Slalom	10th
2023	29 Dec 2022	Semmering, Austria	Slalom	10th
2023	18 Mar 2023	Soldeu, Andorra	Slalom	7th

== World Championship results ==
Year
Year	Age	Slalom	Giant slalom	Super-G	Downhill	Combined	Team event
2011	18	DNF1	55	—	—	—	—
2013	20	35	39	—	—	—	—
2015	22	DNS1	—	—	—	—	—
2017	24	32	DNF1	—	—	—	9
2019	26	DNS2	—	—	—	—	9
2023	30	DNS2	—	—	—	—	10
2025	32	16	—	—	—	—N/a	—

== Olympic results ==
Year
Year	Age	Slalom	Giant slalom	Super-G	Downhill	Combined	Team combined	Team event
2014	21	22	DNF1	—	—	—	—N/a	—N/a
2018	25	29	DNF1	—	—	—	—N/a	9
2022	29	13	—	—	—	—	—N/a	—
2026	33	18	—	—	—	—N/a	16	—N/a
