= Adriana Jelínková =

Dutch-Czech alpine ski racer (born 1995)

Adriana Jelinkova
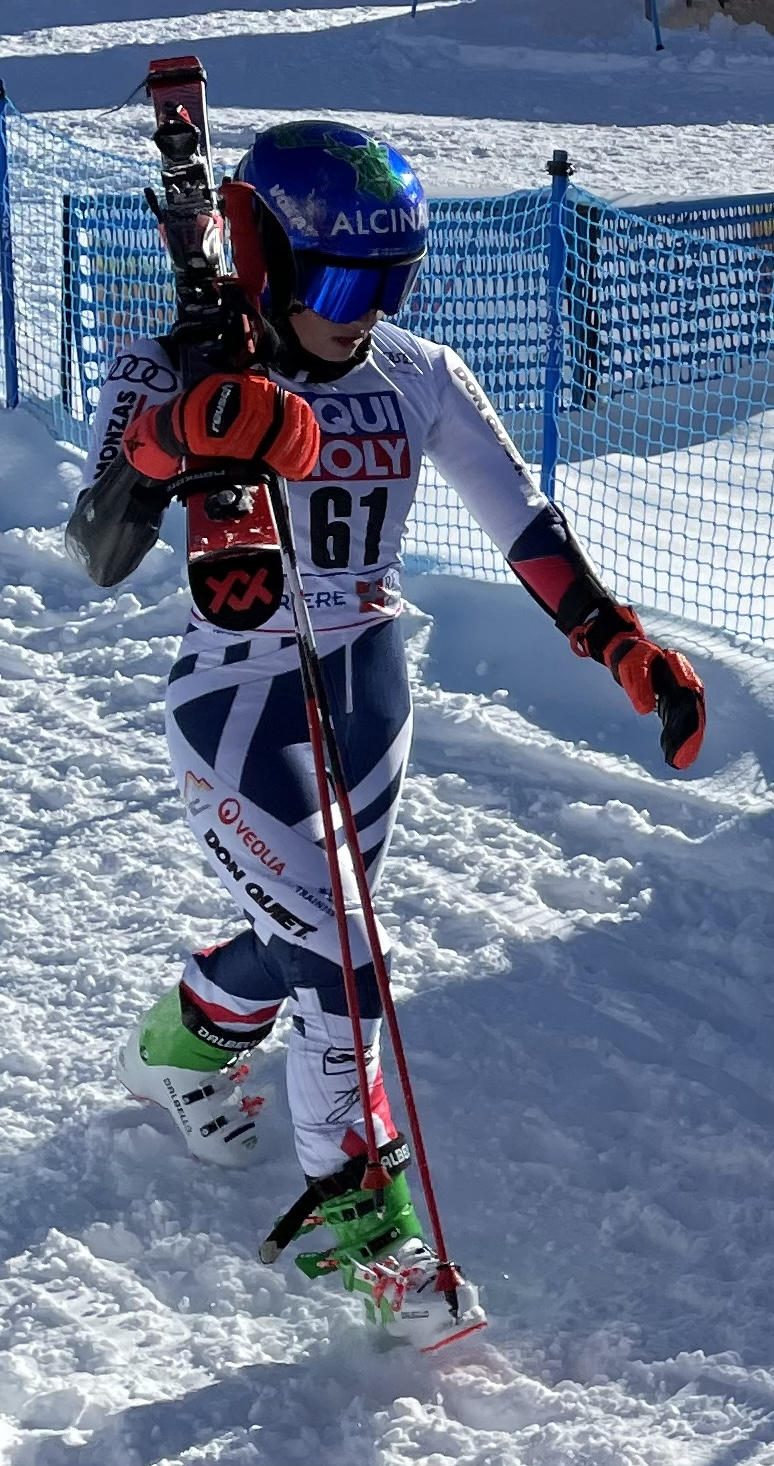
- Jelinkova in 2022

Personal information
- Born: 10 April 1995 (age 31) Brno, Czech Republic
- Website: adrianajelinkova.com

Skiing career
- Country: Netherlands (until 2021/22); Czech Republic (2022/23–present)
- Sport: Alpine skiing
- Club: Snowsports Academy Racing and Skiclub Bad Gastein
- Disciplines: Giant slalom, slalom
- World Cup debut: 16 December 2012 (age 17)

Olympics
- Teams: 1 – (2022)

World Championships
- Teams: 4 – (2013, 2015, 2017, 2019)

World Cup
- Seasons: 14 – (2013–2026)
Medal record
Women's alpine skiing
Representing Netherlands
Winter Youth Olympic Games
Bronze medal – third place	2012 Innsbruck	Super Combined

Adriana Jelinkova (born Jelínková, 10 April 1995) is an alpine ski racer who specialises in the technical events of giant slalom and slalom. Originally represented the Netherlands at her debut for the 2013 Alpine Skiing World Cup, she changed her nationality to Czech Republic in May 2022.

== Early life ==
Jelinkova was born in the Czech Republic, but grew up with her family in the Netherlands and stayed there until 11 years old. Afterwards, Jelinkova moved to Austria, where she completed the second grade of elementary school at the ski school in Bad Gastein and subsequently graduated from the ski gymnasium in Saalfelden. Jelinkova is multilingual, able to speak Czech, Dutch, German, and English.

== Career ==
Jelinkova made her World Cup debut on 16 December 2012 in the Courchevel giant slalom, but she failed to finish the first run. She competed for the Netherlands at the 2013 Alpine World Ski Championships in Schladming, Austria. She finished 40th in the giant slalom. She competed at the 2015 Alpine World Ski Championships in Vail / Beaver Creek, United States. She did not start the first run of the slalom. She competed at the 2017 Alpine World Ski Championships in St. Moritz, Switzerland. She finished 36th in the giant slalom and 30th in the slalom. She competed at the 2019 Alpine World Ski Championships in Åre, Sweden. She finished 33rd in the giant slalom and 19th in the slalom.

== World Cup results ==
=== Results per discipline ===
Discipline	WC starts	WC Top 30	WC Top 15	WC Top 5	WC Podium	Best result		
Discipline	WC starts	WC Top 30	WC Top 15	WC Top 5	WC Podium	Date	Location	Place
Slalom	29	0	0	0	0			
Giant slalom	46	5	0	0	0	16 January 2021	(Slovenia) Kranjska Gora	11th
Combined	1	1	0	0	0	26 January 2018	(Switzerland) Lenzerheide	27th
Parallel	2	1	1	0	0	26 November 2020	(Austria) Zürs	10th
Parallel slalom	2	1	0	0	0	20 December 2017	(France) Courchevel	25th
Total	80	8	1	0	0			

- Standings through 18 March 2022

== World Championships results ==
Year
Year	Age	Slalom	Giant; Slalom	Super G	Downhill	Combined	Parallel
2013	17	—	40	—	—	—	—
2015	19	DNS1	—	—	—	—	—
2017	21	30	36	—	—	—	—
2019	23	19	33	—	—	—	—
