= Nevena Ignjatović =

Serbian alpine skier (born 1990)

Personal information
- Born: 28 December 1990 (age 35) Kragujevac, Republic of Serbia, SFR Yugoslavia

Skiing career
- Sport: Alpine skiing
- Club: Radnički
- Disciplines: Downhill, Combined, Super-G
- World Cup debut: 17 January 2010

Olympics
- Teams: 3 – (10, 14, 18)
- Medals: 0 (0 gold)

World Championships
- Teams: 5 – (11–21)
- Medals: 0 (0 gold)

World Cup
- Seasons: 9 – (10–18)
- Wins: 0
- Podiums: 0
- Overall titles: 0
- Discipline titles: 0
Medal record
Women's alpine skiing
Representing Serbia
Universiade
Gold medal – first place	2013 Trentino	Slalom
World Military Championships
Silver medal – second place	2015 Boden	Giant Slalom Team

Nevena Ignjatović (Serbian Cyrillic: Невена Игњатовић, pronounced [něʋana iɡɲǎːtoʋitɕ]; born 28 December 1990 in Kragujevac, Republic of Serbia, SFR Yugoslavia) is a Serbian alpine skier.

She was named to the Serbian team at the 2010, 2014 and 2018 Winter Olympics.

== World Cup results ==
=== Season standings ===
Season	Age	Overall	Slalom	Giant Slalom	Super G	Downhill	Combined
2015	25	117	—	—	—	—	27
2016	26	118	—	—	—	—	45
2017	27	87	40	—	—	—	47
2018	28	67	32	—	—	—	8
2019	29	94	—	53	—	—	11
2020	30	93	—	—	—	—	18

== Olympic results ==
Event	Slalom	Giant slalom	Super-G	Downhill	Combined
2010	32	39	DNF	—	—
2014	DNF1	28	—	—	—
2018	26	26	—	—	14
2022	—	—	—	30	DSQ

== World Championship results ==
Year
Year	Age	Slalom	Giant; Slalom	Super G	Downhill	Combined	Parallel	Team Event
2011	21	32	50	—	—	—	—N/a	—
2013	23	34	41	—	—	—	—N/a	—
2015	25	DNF1	42	—	—	—	—N/a	—
2017	27	DNF2	27	—	—	24	—N/a	—
2019	29	28	39	DNF	—	19	—N/a	—
2021	31	—	—	33	DNF	DNF2	—	—

Olympic Games
Preceded by Milanko Petrović	Flagbearer for Serbia; 2018 Pyeongchang	Succeeded by Marko Vukićević
