= St Andrew's College, Christchurch =

Private co-educational school in Christchurch, New Zealand

St Andrew's College
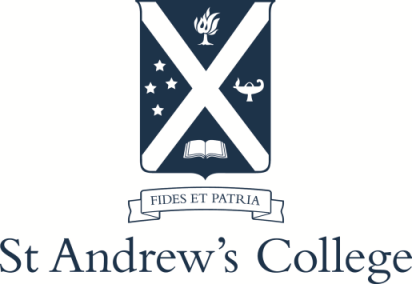

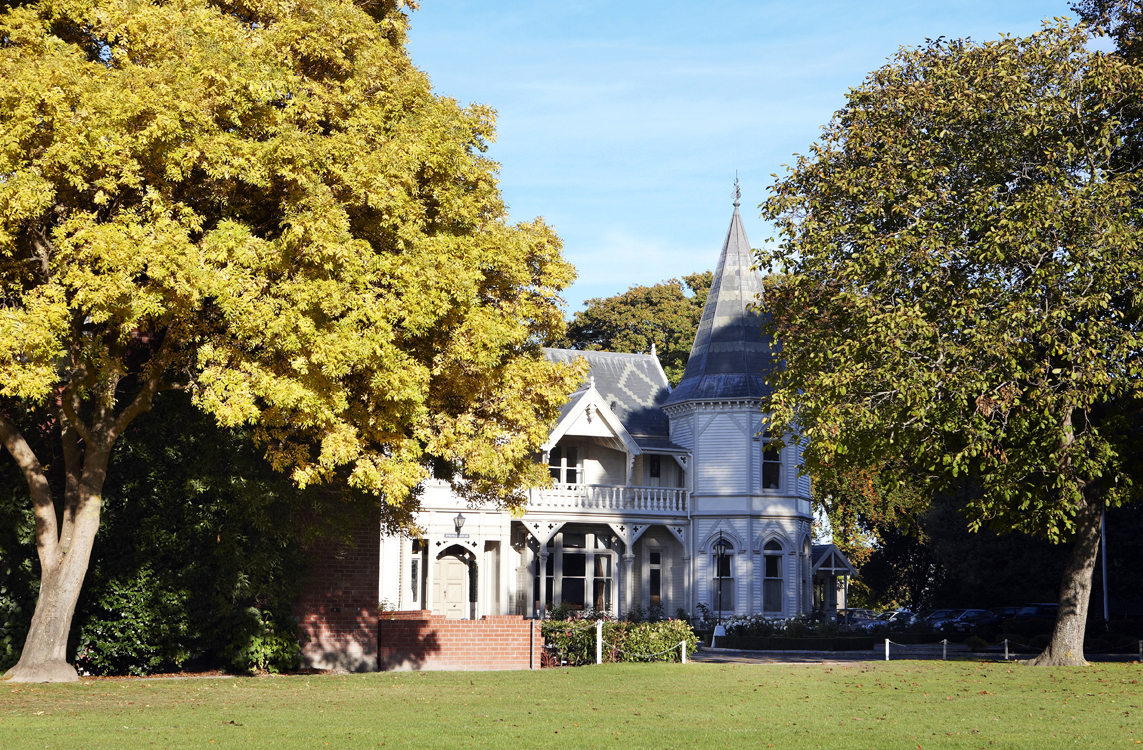
- Strowan House and its adjacent field

Location
- 347 Papanui Road; Strowan; Christchurch 8052; New Zealand; 43.5081°S 172.6138°E

Information
- Type: Private, fully reg. (Years 1–13)
- Motto: Fides et Patria "Faith and Country"
- Established: 1917
- Ministry of Education Institution no.: 318
- Chairperson: Felicity Odlin
- Rector: Mark Wilson
- Chaplain: Paul Morrow
- Enrolment: 1,634 (July 2026)
- Socio-economic decile: 10
- Website: stac.school.nz

St Andrew's College, also known as StAC, is an independent, co-educational school in Christchurch, New Zealand, with a Pre-school for ages 2–5, Preparatory School (Years 1–8) and a Secondary School (Years 9–13). The College offers boarding for boys and girls in the Secondary School. Founded in 1917 as an all-boys school, St Andrew's became fully co-educational in 2001. It is the only independent, co-educational primary and secondary school in New Zealand's South Island.

The current Rector of St Andrew's College is Mark Wilson, who began his tenure at the start of 2025. Leigh Fowler has been Principal of the Preparatory School since January 2026; her appointment was announced in December 2025, when she was principal of Te Rito Harakeke – Marshland School. The Secondary School Principal is Evert van Florenstein.

== History ==
St Andrew's College was founded by Rev. Alexander Thomas Thompson in 1917 in the Scottish Presbyterian tradition. It was established to "educate the sons of the Presbyterian and Scottish community of Canterbury" and began with 19 boys and four teachers.'

Over the following decades the school grew from its original buildings on Papanui Road into a combined campus offering both preparatory and secondary education. While maintaining its Presbyterian character, the College broadened its programmes and facilities as enrolments increased.

The College transitioned to co-education in stages. Girls were enrolled in the Preparatory School during the 1980s, and in 1991, Rector, Dr John Rentoul, and the Board of Governors approved the decision to allow girls to enrol in the Secondary School. The College became fully co-educational across all year levels in 2001.

On 31 October 2008, students and teachers set a world record for the largest school mass dance with a performance of the YMCA.

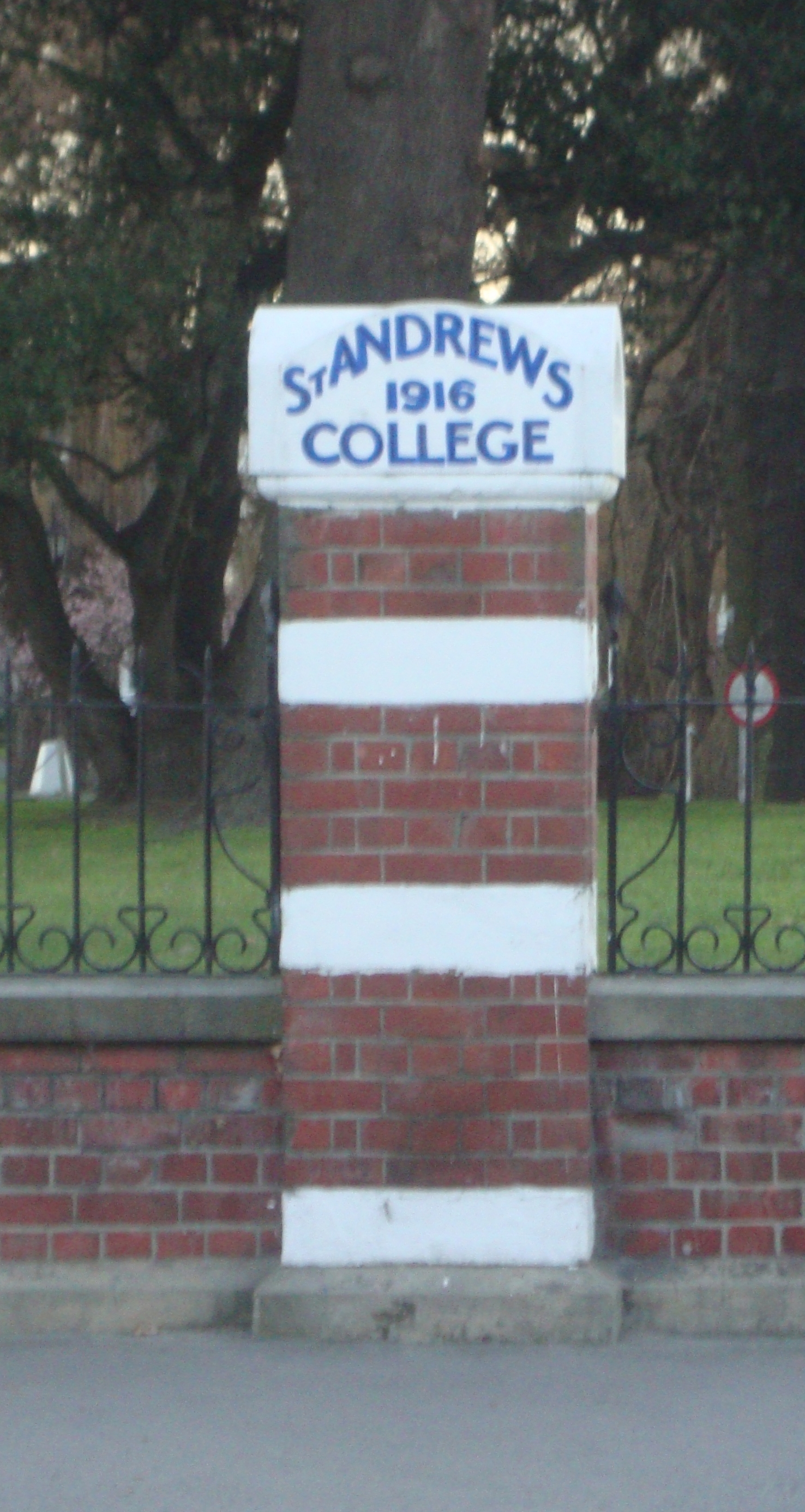
St Andrew's College gate column

The 2011 Christchurch earthquake damaged a number of buildings, including the Memorial Chapel, and forced the temporary closure of the Arts Block and Strowan House. Damage to boarding facilities led to boarders being relocated while repairs and strengthening work were completed.

The renovated and strengthened Preparatory School was officially reopened by the Governor-General, Sir Jerry MateparaeIn February 2012.

As part of the post-earthquake redevelopment, the old MacGibbon and Thompson boarding houses were demolished. In March 2013, new boarding houses – Rutherford (Senior boys, Years 11–13) and Thompson (girls, Years 9–13) – were formally opened by the Right Honourable John Key, Prime Minister of New Zealand.

Further facilities work followed. In 2014 the old Rutherford/Erwin house was demolished to make way for a second gym, and new hockey and netball courts were completed alongside an upgrade of the rugby field. In 2016 a new Centennial Chapel was opened, incorporating design elements from the original Memorial Chapel, which was officially decommissioned in October 2013. The Askin Pipe Band Centre was also rebuilt and reopened. The Green Library and Innovation Centre opened in 2018.

Construction of the StACFit Fitness Centre began in December 2019 and was completed for the start of the 2021 academic year. It replaced the old fitness centre and is used by sports team, curriculum classes, and special programmes.

In 2024, the College completed Ngā Toi Performing Arts Centre, replacing the previous theatre.

=== Ngā Toi Performing Arts Centre ===
Ngā Toi Performing Arts Centre was completed in 2024, replacing the previous theatre at St Andrew's College. Ngā Toi comprises the 266-seat Gough Family Theatre, along with a number of ballet, dance, drama and performing arts studios, technical AV room, Old Collegians Foyer, and a cafeteria.

- Old Collegians' Foyer: The foyer serves as the main entry to Ngā Toi and the Gough Family Theatre. Supported by the Old Collegians Association, it functions as a flexible meeting space for gatherings and informal events.
- Gough Family Theatre: The theatre is equipped with acoustic design, advanced lighting systems, and a seating capacity of 266. It is used for productions, events, educational activities, and community functions.
- Fife Dance and Drama Studios: The studios support the performing arts curriculum and include:
  - Lesley Johnston Ballet Studio: A facility for the St Andrew's College Ballet Academy and co-curricular dance activities.
  - Blair Gough Drama Studio: Designed for drama classes, this space accommodates up to 50 people.
  - Jack and Georgia Satterthwaite Dance Studio: A studio for the Ballet Academy and other dance programmes.
  - PTA Green Room: Located behind the theatre stage, the Green Room provides facilities for student preparation, including hair and make-up, with support from the Parent Teacher Association.
- The Westgarth Family AV Room: This space serves as the technical centre for theatre operations, offering facilities for lighting design, set-up, and operation, including an overhead gantry system.

=== Incidents ===
In 2020, RNZ reported that students alleged a teacher tore down Black Lives Matter posters and spoke to them in a verbally abusive manner. The school conducted an investigation but did not publish the outcome.

In February 2025, Stuff reported that a student was suspended following an incident on a Year 6 school camp.

== Enrolment ==
As an independent school, St Andrew's College charges tuition fees to cover costs. For the 2026 school year, tuition fees for New Zealand residents range between $21,100 and $25,100 per year for students in Years 1 to 6, $26,600 for students in Years 7 and 8, and $30,600 per year for students in Years 9 to 13. Boarding fees are an additional $20,600 per year.

As of July 2026, St Andrews's College has a roll of 1,634 students, of which 131 (8.0%) identify as Māori. As a private school, the school is not assigned an Equity Index.

== Rectors ==
The following is a complete list of the rectors of St Andrew's College:

	Name	Term
1	Sydney Rushbrook Dickinson	1917–1919
2	Alexander Knox Anderson	1920–1934
3	John Bibby Mawson	1934–1947
4	Leslie Walter Stewart	1948–1962
5	Ian Galloway	1962–1982
6	John Rentoul	1982–1994
7	Barry Maister	1994–2001
8	Nigel Fairbairn	2002–2004
9	Harvey Rees-Thomas	2005–2007
10	Christine Leighton	2007–2024
11	Mark Wilson	2025–present

The current Rector of St Andrew's College is Mark Wilson, who began his tenure at the start of 2025. Prior to this, Wilson served as a principal for over 15 years at three other co-educational schools. He has previously served on the national executive of SPANZ (Secondary School Principals Association of New Zealand), and was awarded the Woolf Fisher Fellowship in 2018.

Prior to Mark Wilson, Christine Leighton was the Rector of St Andrew’s College for 17 years, becoming the first female Rector since the College’s founding in 1917, and leading the College’s Centenary celebrations in 2017. During her early career, Leighton taught in a variety of New Zealand schools as a teacher of English. Her leadership roles included serving as Assistant Head of English at Nayland College, Head of English at Tauranga Boys’ College, Assistant Principal at Nelson College for Girls, and Principal of St Hilda’s Collegiate School in Dunedin for nine years. She was accepted into a Harvard University Business Programme in 2014, completing ISL, a Strategic Leadership Programme, in 2001. Leighton joined the Association of the Heads of Independent Schools in 2014, later becoming a Board member and being elected Deputy Chair in 2020. She retired at the end of 2024.

== Notable alumni ==
- Albert Anderson (born 1961), rugby union player
- Mark Abbott (born 1991), rugby union player
- Andrew Bird (born 1967), Olympic coxswain
- Ben Blair (born 1979), rugby union player
- John Britten (1950–1995), inventor
- Scott Cartwright (born 1954), rugby union player
- Mark Chignell (born 1956), human factors researcher
- Rod Donald (1957–2005), Member of Parliament
- Joe Earl (born 1952), Olympic rower
- Mick Ensor (1922–1994), Second World War pilot
- Peter Gordon (1921–1991), Member of Parliament and cabinet minister
- Eliza Grigg (born 1996), alpine ski racer
- Chris Harris (born 1969), cricketer
- Hamish Hay (1927–2008), former mayor of Christchurch
- Doug Kennedy (1915–1972), director-general of health
- Phil Keoghan (born 1967), television presenter and host
- Roy Kerr (born 1934), mathematician
- Chris King (born 1981), rugby union player
- Richie Mo'unga (born 1994), rugby union player
- Carl Nixon (born 1967), novelist, short story writer and playwright
- Gordon Ogilvie (1934–2017), historian
- Tim Perry (rugby union) (born 1988), rugby union player
- Jack Rumbold (1920–2001), cricketer and colonial legal administrator
- Sir Ieremia Tabai (born 1950), first president of Kiribati (1979–1991), politician
- Koloti Veainu (born 1990), rugby union player
- Philip Woollaston (born 1944), politician; vintner
- Hugh Wilson (born 1945), botanist
- Richard Wilson (born 1953), rugby union player
- Rodney Wilson (1945–2013), art historian and museum director
- Alex Wyllie (born 1944), rugby union player
