= Victoria Bell =

Irish alpine skier (born 1994)

Personal information
- Born: 22 June 1994 (age 32) Sutton Coldfield, United Kingdom

Sport
- Country: Ireland
- Sport: Alpine skiing

Victoria Bell (born 22 June 1994 in Sutton Coldfield, United Kingdom) is an alpine skier from Ireland. She is the sister of Alpine Skier Florence Bell.

Victoria competed for Ireland in Slalom and giant slalom at the 2011 European Youth Olympic Winter Festival and at the World Junior Alpine Skiing Championships 2012. In the same year she was awarded a scholarship by the International Olympic Committee.

In 2013 Victoria captained her school (King Edward VI Handsworth School) to "Overall School" and "Overall Team" victories and 23 other podium places at the British Schoolgirl Races in Flaine, France which was a record in the 50-year history of the event. In the same year she represented Ireland in Slalom and giant slalom at the FIS Alpine World Ski Championships 2013

In 2015 Victoria represented Ireland in Slalom at the FIS Alpine World Ski Championships 2015 in Vail & Beaver Creek, USA

In 2017 Victoria represented Cambridge University in the varsity races against Oxford University in both Slalom and giant slalom where Cambridge Ladies 1st team won all events and Victoria won the individual Slalom title. For her performance in the varsity races Victoria was awarded a full Cambridge blue.
