= Elli Terwiel =

Canadian specializing in slalom skiing (born 1989)

Personal information
- Born: April 16, 1989 (age 37) New Westminster, British Columbia
- Height: 1.72 m (5 ft 8 in)

Skiing career
- Sport: Alpine skiing
- Disciplines: Slalom

Elli Terwiel (born April 16, 1989 in New Westminster, British Columbia) is a Canadian specializing in slalom skiing. She represented Canada in this event at the 2014 Winter Olympics and also skied collegiately at the University of Vermont. Terwiel currently resides in Sun Peaks, British Columbia.
