= Julia Ford (skier) =

American alpine skier

Personal information
- Born: March 30, 1990 (age 36) Peabody, MA

Skiing career
- Sport: Alpine skiing ♀
- Disciplines: Downhill, super combined, super-G

Julia Ford (born March 30, 1990) is an American alpine skier and a member of the United States Ski Team's alpine skiing program. Ford competed in the 2014 Winter Olympics in Sochi, Russia.
