= Julietta Quiroga =

Argentine alpine skier (born 1988)

Personal information
- Full name: Julietta Quiroga Cavalli
- Born: 1 November 1988 (age 36); Crossnore, North Carolina, U.S.

Sport
- Country: Argentina
- Sport: Alpine skiing
- Club: Club Andino Bariloche

Julietta Quiroga Cavalli (born 1 November 1988 in Crossnore, North Carolina, United States) is an alpine skier competing for Argentina. She competed for Argentina at the 2014 Winter Olympics in the slalom and giant slalom.

She currently resides in Bariloche, Argentina.
