= Eliza Grigg =

New Zealand alpine skier (born 1996)

Eliza Grigg (born 9 October 1996) is a New Zealand alpine ski racer from Hororata, Canterbury.

== Early life ==
Grigg grew up on a farm in Canterbury, New Zealand. She started skiing aged 22 months, and joined Team Hutt aged eight. She attended St. Andrew's College, Christchurch.

== Career ==
From 2013 Grigg has trained with Coberger Academy at Coronet Peak. She is a member of the New Zealand Ski Women's C Team, competing in the giant slalom, slalom, super combined, and super-g events. In 2017 she was part of the New Zealand team at the Alpine World Ski Championship in St. Moritz, Switzerland as well as World Junior Championship in Sweden. She went on to compete at the 2019 Alpine World Ski Championship in Are, Sweden.
