= Salomé Báncora =

Argentine alpine skier (born 1993)

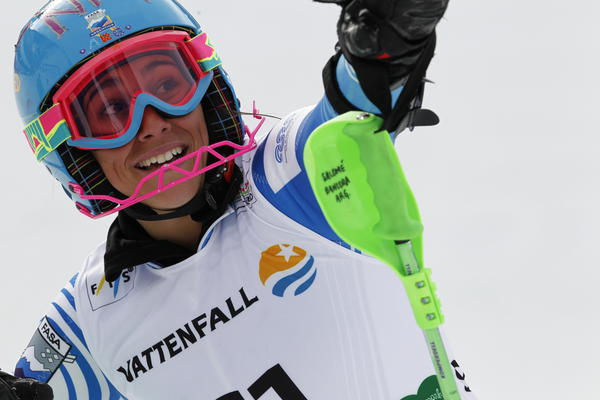

Personal information
- Born: February 28, 1993 (age 33) Alejandro Korn, Buenos Aires, Argentina

Sport
- Country: Argentina
- Sport: Alpine skiing

Achievements and titles
- Olympic finals: 25 slalom - Sochi 2014
Medal record
- 2015 - Campeona Sudamericana de Slalom Gigante
- 2015 - Campeona Argentina de Slalom

Salomé Báncora (born February 28, 1993, in Buenos Aires, Argentina) is an alpine skier competing for Argentina. She competed for Argentina at the 2014 Winter Olympics in the slalom and giant slalom.

2014:

- Campeona Argentina de Slalom

2015:

- Campeona Argentina de Slalom Gigante

2016:

- Campeona Argentina de Slalom
