= Erla Ásgeirsdóttir =

Icelandic alpine skier (born 1994)

Personal information
- Born: 27 January 1994 (age 32) Reykjavík, Iceland
Medal record
Alpine skiing
Representing Iceland

Erla Ásgeirsdóttir (born 27 January 1994 in Reykjavík, Iceland) is an alpine skier from Iceland. She competed for Iceland at the 2014 Winter Olympics in slalom and giant slalom at the alpine skiing events.
