= Ieva Januškevičiūtė =

Lithuanian alpine skier (born 1994)

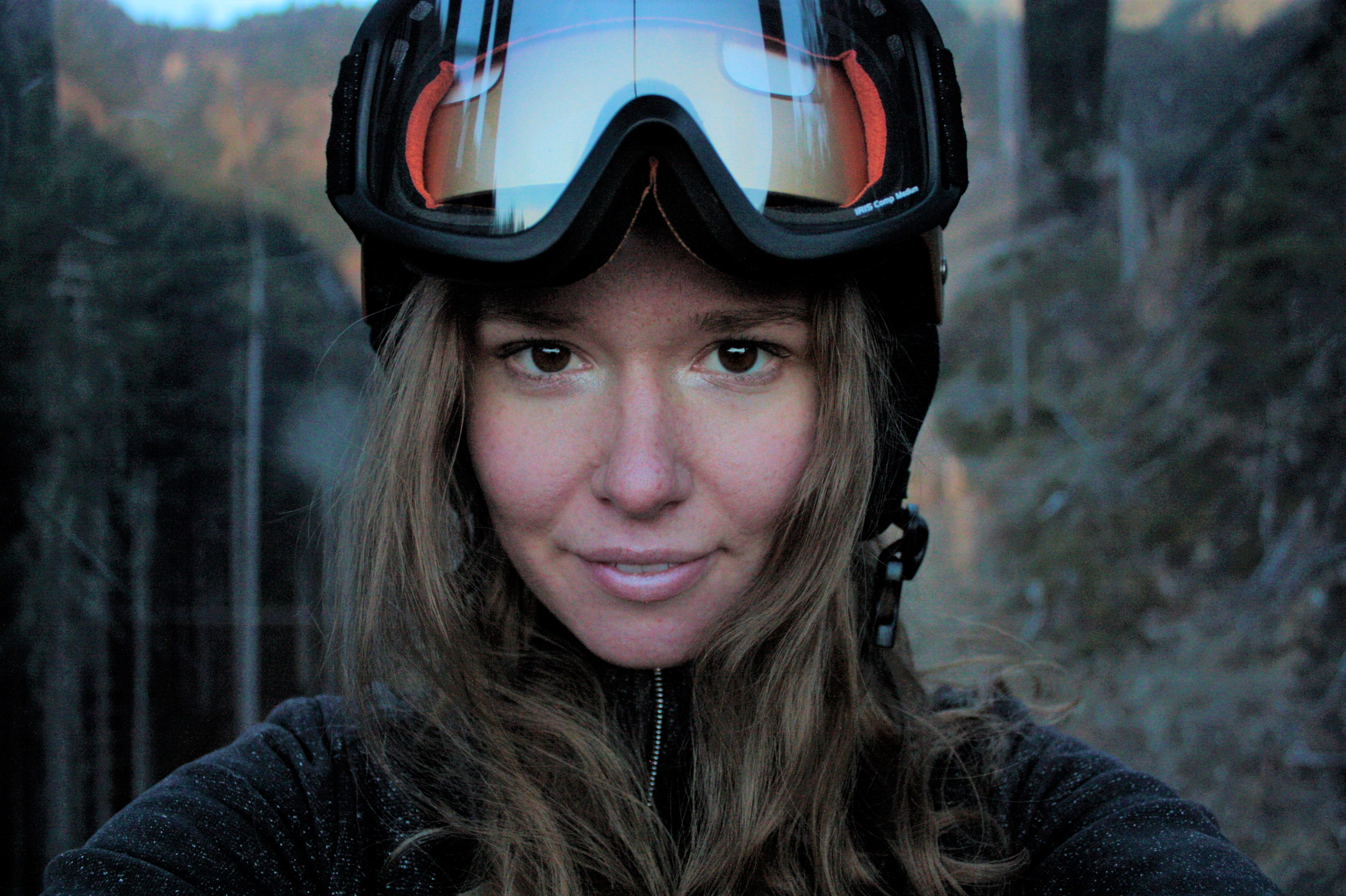

Personal information
- Citizenship: Lithuanian
- Born: September 22, 1994 (age 31) Vilnius, Lithuania
- Education: Physiotherapy; Lithuanian Sports University
- Occupation(s): Athlete, Student
- Height: 1.67 m (5 ft 6 in)
- Weight: 58 kg (128 lb)

Sport
- Country: Lithuania
- Sport: Alpine Skiing
- Club: Kalnų Ereliai; Kronplatz Racing Centre
- Coached by: Jennifer Virskus (2004-2009) Nicola Paulon (2013-2019)

Ieva Januškevičiūtė (born 22 September 1994) is a Lithuanian alpine skier and two-time Winter Olympian. She is the first Lithuanian woman to compete in the Winter Olympics in alpine skiing. She is currently a personal trainer based in Vilnius.

== Biography ==
Januškevičiūtė first stood on skis on a family trip to the Tatra mountains at age five. She began ski racing at the age of 12 as a member of the "Kalnų ereliai" (Mountain Eagles) ski club, based at "Žiemos trasa" on Liepkalnis in Januškevičiūtė's hometown of Vilnius. Her first coach was Lithuanian-American Jennifer Virskus. At the age of 13, she was interviewed by Trans World Sport as part of a feature about the Kalnų ereliai ski team. She later joined Kronplatz Racing Centre in Italy and was coached by Nicola Paulon.

In 2012 at the age of 18 she broke Lithuanian national records of women's alpine skiing FIS points.

In 2013, she competed at FIS Alpine World Ski Championships 2013: 81st in giant slalom, did not finish in slalom.

In 2014 Januškevičiūtė was selected to represent Lithuania in 2014 Winter Olympic Games. She attracted a lot of local media attention as being the first Lithuanian female alpine skier that qualified for the Olympics.

In 2014 Winter Olympics she participated in two events. Januškevičiūtė finished 71st at the first run of giant slalom, but did not finish the second one. During the slalom, one of her skies detached, and she could not finish the course.

In 2015, she represented Lithuania at the 2015 FIS Alpine World Ski Championships at Beaver Creek, Colorado.

In 2018 Januškevičiūtė was selected to represent Lithuania at the 2018 Winter Olympic Games. She finished 54th in giant slalom and 43rd in the women's slalom event.
