= Lelde Gasūna =

Latvian alpine skier (born 1990)

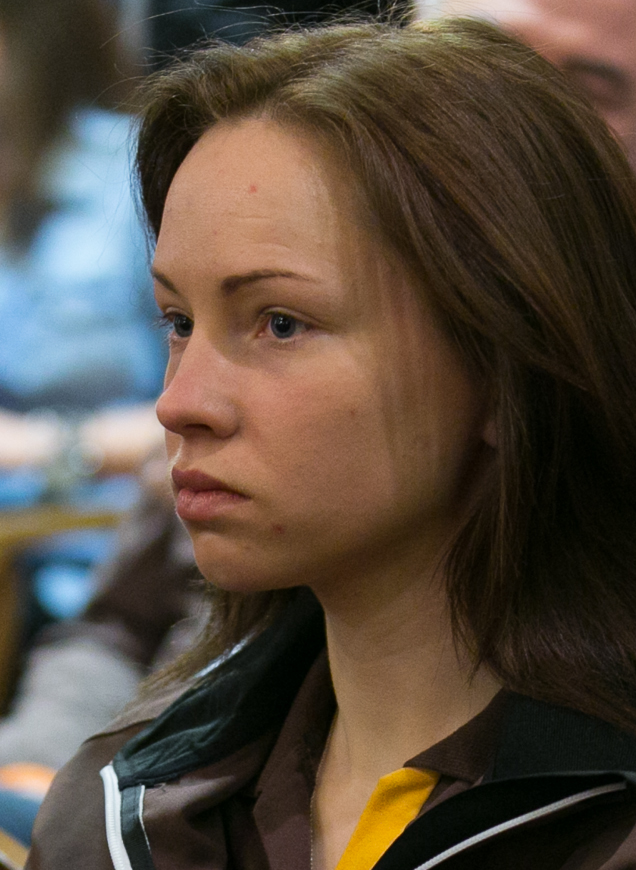
- Gasūna in 2014

Personal information
- Nationality: Latvian
- Born: 17 September 1990 (age 34); Sigulda

Sport
- Sport: Alpine skiing

Lelde Gasūna (born 17 September 1990) is a Latvian alpine skier. She was born in Sigulda. She competed at the 2014 Winter Olympics in Sochi, in giant slalom and slalom.
