= Kateřina Pauláthová =

Czech alpine skier (born 1993)

Personal information
- Born: 23 July 1993 (age 32) Havířov, Czech Republic
- Height: 171 cm (5 ft 7 in)
- Weight: 65 kg (143 lb)

Sport
- Country: Czech Republic
- Sport: Alpine skiing

Kateřina Pauláthová (born 23 July 1993) is a retired alpine skier from the Czech Republic. She competed for Czech Republic at the 2014 Winter Olympics in the alpine skiing events.
