= Sophia Ralli =

Greek alpine skier (born 1988)

Sophia Ralli (Greek: Σοφία Ράλλη; born 4 March 1988 in Naousa) is an alpine skier from Greece. She competed for Greece at the 2010 Winter Olympics. Her best result was 47th place in the slalom.
