= Canadian Alpine Ski Championships =

International alpine skiing event

- Status: active
- Genre: sporting event
- Begins: 1929 (men) et 1935 (women)
- Frequency: annual
- Location: various
- Organiser: Alpine Canada

The Canadian Alpine Ski Championships is an alpine skiing competition organized by Alpine Canada.

== Organization ==
Theses championships have begun by slalom in 1929 for men, and 1935 for women. Other races have progressively been organized, starting with downhill in 1937. Every year, one or several Canadian ski resorts organize the events, generally beginning from end of March, after the last world cup race. Each title is given after a unique race. Some races may be cancelled (principally speed races) for weather or snow quality reasons.

The five disciplines are :

- Downhill
- Super-G
- Giant slalom
- Slalom
- Combined (not organised every year)

== Results ==
=== Men ===
Year	Place	Downhill	Super-G	Giant slalom	Slalom	Combined
Missing data must be completed
1929		-	-	-	Harald Paumgarten (Austria)	-
1932		-	-	-	Franck Campbell	-
1933		-	-	-	John Blair	-
1935		-	-	-	-	-
1936		-	-	-	Douglas Mann	-
1937		Pierre Francioli (Switzerland)	-	Pierre Francioli (Switzerland)	Pierre Francioli (Switzerland)	Pierre Francioli (Switzerland)
1938		Bob Smith-Johannsen	-	-	Karl Ringer (Germany)	Bob Smith-Johannsen
1939		Percy Bloyd (Norway)	-	-	Louis Georges	Ted Paris
1940		Ted Paris	-	Art Coles	Art Coles	Art Coles
1947		Hector Sutherland	-	-	Bob Richardson	Piere Jalbert
1948		Peter Johnson	-	Peter Johnson	Peter Johnson	Peter Johnson
1949		Jean Pazzi (France)	-	-	Georges Panisset (France)	Georges Panisset (France)
1950		André Bertrand	-	-	Egon Schöpf (United States)	Egon Schöpf
1951		Hector Sutherland	-	-	Bob Richardson	Bob Richardson
1952		G. Cowan	-	-	Egon Schöpf (Austria)	C. Cowan
1953		Guttorm Berge (Norway)	-	-	Guttorm Berge (Norway)	Guttorm Berge (Norway)
1954		André Bertrand	-	-	Tom Corcoan (United States)	André Bertrand
1955		Ralph Miller (United States)	-	-	Egli Stiglum (United States)	Ralph Miller (United States)
1956		Glenn Fraser	-	-	Shaun Fripp	John Clifford
1957		Dave Jacobs	-	-	Chiharu Igaya (Japan)	Art Tommy
1958		Verne Anderson	-	-	Rudy Ruana (United States)	Hérald Gannon
1959		Lee Streeter	-	-	Marsch d'Arcy	Jean Lessard
1960		-	-	Fred Tommy	Arnold Midgley	Arnold Midgley
1961		Heli Summerauer	-	-	Jean Guy Brunet	Arnold Midgley
1962		Jean Guy Brunet	-	Jean Guy Brunet	Rod Hebron	Rod Hebron
1963		Jean Guy Brunet	-	Rod Hebron	Rod Hebron	Peter Duncan
1964		Jean Guy Brunet	-	Willi Forrer	Gerry Rinaldi	Jean Guy Brunet
1965		Scott Henderson & Gerry Rinaldi	-	Rod Hebron	André Pomerleau	André Pomerleau
1966		Scott Henderson	-	Scott Henderson	Scott Henderson	Peter Duncan
1967		Ken Phelps (United States)	-	Rod Hebron	Scott Henderson	-
1968		-	-	Keith Shepherd	Rod Hebron	-
1969		Keith Shepherd	-	Peter Duncan	Peter Duncan	-
1970		-	-	Bill Mckay	Kenny Corrock (United States)	-
1971		David Currier (United States)	-	Jim Hunter	Tyler Palmer (United States)	-
1972		-	-	Massami Ichimura (Japan)	Massami Ichimura (Japan)	-
1973		-	-	Jim Hunter	Paul Carson	-
1974		Gary Aiken	-	Alain Cousineau	Phil Graves	-
1975		Ken Read	-	Jim Hunter	Jim Hunter	Jim Hunter
1976		Ken Read	-	Jim Hunter	Jim Hunter	Jim Hunter
1977		-	-	Jim Hunter	Steve Podborski	Jim Hunter
1978		Ken Read	-	John Hiland	Peter Monod	Ken Read
1979		Ken Read	-	Peter Monod	Raymond Pratte	Dave Murray
1980		Ken Read	-	Peter Monod	Peter Monod	Peter Monod
1981		Robin McLeish	-	Peter Monod	Peter Monod	Robin McLeish
1982		Urs Räber (Switzerland)	-	Jim Read	Peter Monod	-
1983		Steve Podborski	-	Michael Tommy	François Jodoin	-
1984		Steve Podborski	Jim Read	Jim Read	Michael Tommy	-
1985	Fortress Mountain	Steven Lee (Australia)	Mike Brown (United States)	Jim Read	Gordon Perry	-
1986	Mont Sainte-Anne / Stoneham	Donald Stevens	Derek Trussler	Jim Read	Jim Read	-
1987		Brian Stemmle	Jim Read	Alain Villiard	Alain Villiard	Jim Read
1988		Steven Lee (Australia)	Leonhard Stock (Austria)	Tiger Shaw (United States)	Jack Miller (United States)	Roman Torn
1989		Mike Carney	Felix Belczyk	Alain Villiard	Alain Villiard	David Duchesne
1990	Lake Louise	Felix Belczyk	David Duchesne	Robbie Parisien (United States)	Rob Crossan	Ed Podivinsky
1991		Ed Podivinsky	Rob Boyd	Éric Villiard	Alain Villiard	Alain Villiard
1992		Roman Thorn	Reggie Crist (United States)	Thomas Grandi	Rob Crossan	Brett Grabowski (United States)
1993	Lake Louise	John Mealey	Éric Villiard	Thomas Grandi	Rob Crossan	Sébastien Turgeon
1994		Ralf Socher	Ralf Socher	Chris Puckett (United States)	Stanley Hayer	Stanley Hayer
1995	Mont Sainte-Anne / Le Relais	Ed Podivinsky	Brian Stemmle	Thomas Grandi	Stanley Hayer	-
1996	Mont Sainte-Anne / Le Relais	Ed Podivinsky	-	Thomas Grandi	Stanley Hayer	-
1997	Rossland	Graydon Oldfield	Ryan Oughtred	Thomas Grandi	Thomas Grandi	-
1998	Panorama	Daimion Applegath	Darin Mc Beath	Thomas Grandi	Thomas Grandi	-
1999	Sun Peaks	Kevin Wert	Brian Stemmle	Vincent Lavoie	Munroe Hunsicker	-
2000	Sun Peaks	-	-	Jean-Philippe Roy	Michael Tichy	
2001	Mont Sainte-Anne / Mont Orford	Kevin Wert	Kevin Wert	Jean-Philippe Roy	Jean-Philippe Roy	-
2002	Whistler	Erik Guay	Erik Guay	Jean-Philippe Roy	Thomas Grandi	-
2003	Whistler	-	Erik Guay	Thomas Grandi	Thomas Grandi	-
2004	Le Massif / Mont Sainte-Anne	François Bourque	Vincent Lavoie	Jean-Philippe Roy	Michael Janyk	-
2005	Mont Sainte-Anne	-	-	François Bourque	Patrick Biggs	-
2006	Whistler	Jeffrey Frisch	John Kucera	John Kucera	Michael Janyk	-
2007	Whistler	Erik Guay	Jeffrey Frisch	Erik Guay	Paul Stutz	cancelled
2008	Whistler / Stoneham / Le Relais	John Kucera	John Kucera	Erik Guay	Paul Stutz	John Kucera
2009	Le Massif / Mont Sainte-Anne	Jeffrey Frisch	Robbie Dixon	John Kucera	Michael Janyk	Paul Stutz
2010	Nakiska	Manuel Osborne-Paradis	Erik Guay	Brad Spence	Michael Janyk	Ryan Semple
2011	Nakiska	Kelby Albert	Jeffrey Frisch	Jan Hudec	Julien Cousineau	Chris Frank
2012	Le Massif / Mont Sainte-Anne				Trevor Philp	
2013	Whistler	Manuel Osborne-Paradis	Jeffrey Frisch	Trevor Philp	Trevor Philp	
2014	Whistler	Morgan Pridy	Benjamin Thomsen	Tyler Werry	Erik Read	
2015	Nakiska / Mont Sainte-Anne	-	Brodie Seger	David Donaldson	Michael Jasiczek	cancelled
2016	Whistler	Morgan Pridy	Manuel Osborne-Paradis	Trevor Philp	Phil Brown	Trevor Philp
2017	Lake Louise / Nakiska / Tremblant	Broderick Thompson	Tyler Werry	Trevor Philp	AJ Ginnis	
2018	Red Mountain	cancelled	cancelled	Trevor Philp	Erik Read	cancelled
2019	Mount Édouard	-	James Crawford	Erik Read	Jeffrey Read	cancelled
2020	Panorama	Cameron Alexander	-	Riley Seger	Simon Fournier	
2021	Panorama	-	-	Liam Wallace	Liam Wallace	-
2022	Georgian Peaks / Olser Bluff / Panorama	-	Jeffrey Read	Liam Wallace	Simon Fournier	-
2023	Kimberley	-	Kyle Alexander	Justin Alkier	Liam Wallace	-
2024	Red Mountain	-	-	Jamie Casselman	Jesse Kertesz-Knight	-
2025	Tremblant	-	-	Cooper Puckett (United States)	Cooper Puckett (United States)	-
2026	Panorama	-	Cameron Alexander	Ryder Sarchett (United States)	Liam Wallace	-

=== Women ===
Year	Place	Downhill	Super-G	Giant slalom	Slalom	Combined
Missing data must be completed
1935					Madeleine McNichols	Madeleine McNichols
1937		Grace Carter (United States)				Peggy Harlin
1938						Gertrude Wepsala
1939						Gertrude Wepsala
1940		Dorothy Michaels		Dorothy Michaels	Gertrude Wepsala	Dorothy Michaels
1947		Rhoda Wurtele			Dorothy Burden	Dorothy Burden
1948		Dorothy Burden		Dorothy Burden	Ila Lacasse	Dorothy Burden
1949		Rhoda Wurtele			Lucienne Schmith (France)	Lucienne Schmith (France)
1950		Dagmar Rom (Austria)			Dagmar Rom (Austria)	Dagmar Rom (Austria)
1951		Rhoda Wurtele			Rhoda Wurtele	Rhoda Wurtele
1952		Anita Gathe			June McKenzie	Anita Gathe
1953		Lucille Wheeler			Rosemary Schutz	Lucille Wheeler
1954		Monique Langlais			Rosemary Schutz	Monique Langlais
1955		Carlyn Kruger			Monique Langlais	Lucille Wheeler
1956		Susan Christmas			Susan Christmas	Susan Christmas
1957		Gigi Seguin			Gigi Seguin	Gigi Seguin
1958		Beverley Anderson (United States)			Beverley Anderson (United States)	Beverley Anderson (United States)
1959		Anne Heggtveit			Anne Heggtveit	Anne Heggtveit
1960		annulée		Jacqueline Thibaul	Lois Lebouthiller	Lois Lebouthiller
1961		Vicki Rutledge		annulé	Nancy Holland	Vicki Rutledge
1962		Linda Crutchfield		Nancy Greene	Linda Crutchfield	Linda Crutchfield
1963		Nancy Greene		Linda Crutchfield	Nancy Greene	Nancy Greene
1964		Linda Crutchfield		Nancy Greene	Nancy Greene	Linda Crutchfield
1965		Nancy Greene		Nancy Greene	Nancy Greene	Nancy Greene
1966		Nancy Greene		Joan Hannah (United States)	Wendy Allen (United States)	Nancy Greene
1967		Karen Budge (United States)		Nancy Greene	Nancy Greene	Nancy Greene
1968		annulée		Nancy Greene	Nancy Greene	Nancy Greene
1969		Laurie Kreiner		Sue Graves	Judy Leinweber	Sue Graves
1970		annulée		Diana Gibson	Rosie Fortna (United States)	Diana Gibson
1971		Judy Crawford	-	Karen Budge (United States)	Karen Budge (United States)	Karen Budge (United States)
1972		-	-	Ginny Homeyman	Diane Pratt	Ginny Homeyman
1973		-	-	Betsy Clifford	Betsy Clifford	Betsy Clifford
1974		Betsy Devin (United States)	-	Kathy Kreiner	Betsy Clifford	Kathy Kreiner
1975		Kathy Kreiner	-	Betsy Clifford	Kathy Kreiner	Betsy Clifford
1976		Karen Cloutier	-	Kathy Kreiner	Betsy Clifford	Kathy Kreiner
1977		-	-	Kathy Kreiner	Kathy Kreiner	Jane Tidball
1978		Kathy Kreiner	-	Kathy Kreiner	Vanita Hairing	Kathy Kreiner
1979		Loni Klettl	-	Judy Richardson	Betsy Clifford	Judy Richardson
1980		Laurie Graham	-	Lynn Lacasse	Ann Blackburn	Ann Blackburn
1981		Gerry Sorensen	-	Josée Lacasse	Diane Haight	Diane Haight
1982		Diane Lehodey	-	Lynn Lacasse	Lynn Lacasse	-
1983		Gerry Sorensen	Lynn Lacasse	Liisa Savijarvi	Liisa Savijarvi	-
1984		Diane Haight	Laurie Graham	Andréa Bédard	Andréa Bédard	-
1985	Fortress Mountain	Laurie Graham	Karen Percy	Andréa Bédard	Andréa Bédard	-
1986	Mont Sainte-Anne / Stoneham	Karen Percy	Karen Percy	Josée Lacasse	Josée Lacasse	-
1987		Liisa Savijarvi	Karen Percy	Josée Lacasse	Julie Klotz	Kate Pace
1988		Laurie Graham	Karen Percy	Karen Percy	Josée Lacasse	Kerrin Lee-Gartner
1989		Lucie Laroche	Kendra Kobelka	Karen Percy	Sonja Rusch	Camilla Burks
1990	Lake Louise	Lucie Laroche	Nancy Gee	Josée Lacasse	Josée Lacasse	Nancy Gee
1991		Kerrin Lee-Gartner	Michelle McKendry	Annie Laurendeau	Sonya Rusch	Stéphanie Hoolahan
1992		Kerrin Lee-Gartner	Michelle McKendry	Michelle McKendry	Annie Laurendeau	Catherine Lussier
1993	Lake Louise	Kerrin Lee-Gartner	Michelle McKendry	Mélanie Turgeon	Nancy Gee	Nancy Gee
1994		Kate Pace	Michelle McKendry	Edith Rozsa	Katerina Tichy (Czech Republic)	Joanna Magee
1995	Mont Sainte-Anne / Le Relais	Lindsay Roberts	Melanie Turgeon	Melanie Turgeon	Edith Rozsa	-
1996	Mont Sainte-Anne / Le Relais	Kate Pace	-	Melanie Turgeon	Melanie Turgeon	-
1997	Rossland	Kate Pace	Melanie Turgeon	Allison Forsyth	Edith Rozsa	-
1998	Panorama	Jennifer Mickelson	Emily Brydon	Allison Forsyth	Allison Forsyth	-
1999	Sun Peaks	Emily Brydon	Allison Forsyth	Allison Forsyth	Anna Prchal	-
2000	Sun Peaks	-	-	Allison Forsyth	Allison Forsyth	-
2001	Mont Sainte-Anne / Mont Orford	Melanie Turgeon	Anne-Marie Lefrançois	Allison Forsyth	Anna Prchal	-
2002	Whistler	Anne-Marie Lefrançois	Britt Janyk	Britt Janyk	Geneviève Simard	-
2003	Whistler	-	-	Britt Janyk	Britt Janyk	-
2004	Le Massif / Mont Sainte-Anne	Emily Brydon	Emily Brydon	Britt Janyk	Britt Janyk	-
2005	Le Massif / Mont Sainte-Anne	-	Emily Brydon	Geneviève Simard	Emily Brydon	-
2006	Whistler	Britt Janyk	Britt Janyk	Christina Lustenberger	Brigitte Acton	-
2007	Whistler	Shona Rubens	Shona Rubens	Britt Janyk	Shona Rubens	cancelled
2008	Whistler / Mont Sainte-Anne / Le Relais	Larisa Yurkiw	Larisa Yurkiw	Emilie Desforges	Shona Rubens	cancelled
2009	Le Massif / Mont Sainte-Anne	Shona Rubens	Britt Janyk	Geneviève Simard	Shona Rubens	Marie-Michèle Gagnon
2010	Nakiska	Britt Janyk	Emily Brydon	Britt Janyk	Marie-Michèle Gagnon	Marie-Michèle Gagnon
2011	Nakiska	Britt Janyk	Madison McLeish / Britt Janyk	Marie-Michèle Gagnon	Marie-Michèle Gagnon	Marie-Michèle Gagnon
2012	Le Massif / Mont Sainte-Anne				Marie-Michèle Gagnon	
2013	Whistler	Larisa Yurkiw	Marie-Michèle Gagnon	Marie-Michèle Gagnon	Marie-Michèle Gagnon	
2014	Whistler	Roni Remme	Madison Irwin	Marie-Pier Prefontaine	Marie-Michèle Gagnon	
2015	Nakiska / Mont Sainte-Anne	-	Candace Crawford	Marie-Pier Prefontaine	Erin Mielzynski	cancelled
2016	Whistler	Valérie Grenier	Marie-Michèle Gagnon	Marie-Michèle Gagnon	Marie-Michèle Gagnon	Candace Crawford
2017	Lake Louise / Nakiska / Tremblant	Stefanie Fleckenstein	Georgia Burgess	Valérie Grenier	Erin Mielzynski	
2018	Red Mountain	cancelled	cancelled	Valérie Grenier	Erin Mielzynski	cancelled
2019	Mount Édouard	-	Beatrix Lever	Marie-Michèle Gagnon	Laurence St-Germain	cancelled
2020	Panorama	Ella Renzoni	-	Cassidy Gray	Justine Clément	
2021	Panorama	-	-	Kiara Alexander	Sarah Bennett	-
2022	Georgian Peaks / Olser Bluff / Panorama	-	Katrina Van Soest	Sarah Bennett	Sarah Bennett	-
2023	Kimberley	-	Britt Richardson	Cassidy Gray	Eleri Smart	-
2024	Red Mountain	-	-	Cassidy Gray	Elisabeth Creighton	-
2025	Tremblant	-	-	Kendra Giesbrecht	Kiki Alexander	-
2026	Panorama	-	Amelie Bourgeois	Cassidy Gray	Amelia Smart	-

== References and notes ==
- from 1929 to 2011 : "Past canadian champions". www.yumpu.com.
- from 1995 :"Competition results". fis-ski.com.
