= 2021–22 FIS Alpine Ski Nor-Am Cup =

Skiing competition

Discipline	Men	Women
Overall	(Canada) Liam Wallace	(United States) Ava Sunshine Jemison
Downhill	(Canada) Liam Wallace	(Canada) Stephanie Fleckenstein
Super-G	(Canada) Kyle Alexander	(Canada) Candace Crawford
Giant slalom	(Canada) Riley Seger	(United States) Allie Resnick
Slalom	(Canada) Liam Wallace	(United States) Lila Lapanja
Alpine combined	(United States) Isaiah Nelson	(United States) Ava Sunshine Jemison
Parallel giant slalom	(Sweden) Lukas Ermeskog	(Canada) Cassidy Gray

Competition
Locations	7 venues	7 venues
Individual	32 events	30 events

The 2021–22 FIS Alpine Ski Nor-Am Cup is the upcoming, fifty-first consecutive Nor-Am Cup season, the second international level competition in alpine skiing.

== Men ==
=== Calendar ===
Event key: DH – Downhill, SL – Slalom, GS – Giant slalom, SG – Super giant slalom, AC – Alpine Combined, PG – Parallel giant slalom
Season	Date	Place	Type	Winner	Second	Third	Ref.
	16 November 2021	(United States) Vail	SL	cancelled, moved to Copper Mountain, United States			
	17 November 2021	(United States) Vail	SL	cancelled, moved to Copper Mountain, United States			
1	20 November 2021	(United States) Copper Mountain	GS	(Slovakia) Andreas Zampa	(Germany) Fabian Gratz	(United States) Jett Seymour	Results
2	21 November 2021	(United States) Copper Mountain	GS	(Switzerland) Thomas Tumler	(Germany) Anton Grammel	(United States) Luke Winters	Results
3	22 November 2021	(United States) Copper Mountain	SL	(Canada) Liam Wallace	(Germany) David Ketterer	(Canada) Simon Fournier	Results
4	23 November 2021	(United States) Copper Mountain	SL	(United States) Luke Winters	(United States) Alex Leever	(United States) Garret Driller	Results
5	8 December 2021	(Canada) Lake Louise	DH	(Canada) Jeffrey Read	(Canada) Kyle Alexander	(United Kingdom) Roy-Alexander Steudle	Results
6	9 December 2021	(Canada) Lake Louise	DH	(Canada) Jeffrey Read	(Canada) Kyle Alexander	(United States) Spencer Wright	Results
7	10 December 2021	(Canada) Lake Louise	SG	(Canada) Kyle Alexander	(Canada) Riley Seger	(United States) Jay Poulter	Results
	12 December 2021	(Canada) Panorama	AC	cancelled, Alpine Combined race rescheduled to Whiteface Mountain, United States			
	12 December 2021	(Canada) Panorama	SG	cancelled, Alpine Combined race rescheduled to Whiteface Mountain, United States			
8	13 December 2021	(Canada) Panorama	SG	(Canada) Riley Seger	(Switzerland) Franjo von Allmen	(Canada) Kyle Alexander	Results
9	14 December 2021	(Canada) Panorama	PG	(Sweden) Lukas Ermeskog	(Canada) Declan McCormack	(Canada) Liam Wallace	Results
10	15 December 2021	(Canada) Panorama	SL	(Sweden) Adam Hofstedt	(Switzerland) Reto Mächler	(United States) Ryder Sarchett	Results
11	16 December 2021	(Canada) Panorama	SL	(Canada) Jordan Asher	(Canada) Sam Mulligan	(Canada) Justin Alkier	Results
12	17 December 2021	(Canada) Panorama	GS	(Canada) Liam Wallace	(United States) Cooper Cornelius	(Canada) Jordan Asher	Results
13	18 December 2021	(Canada) Panorama	GS	(United States) Cooper Cornelius	(Canada) Liam Wallace	(Canada) Jordan Asher	Results
	7 February 2022	(Canada) Mount Édouard	GS	cancelled, moved to Whiteface Mountain, United States			
	8 February 2022	(Canada) Mount Édouard	GS	cancelled, moved to Whiteface Mountain, United States			
	9 February 2022	(Canada) Mount Édouard	SL	cancelled, moved to Whiteface Mountain, United States			
	10 February 2022	(Canada) Mount Édouard	SL	cancelled, moved to Whiteface Mountain, United States			
	14 February 2022	(United States) Burke Mountain	AC	cancelled, moved to Whiteface Mountain, United States			
	14 February 2022	(United States) Burke Mountain	SG	cancelled, moved to Whiteface Mountain, United States			
	15 February 2022	(United States) Burke Mountain	SG	cancelled, moved to Whiteface Mountain, United States			
14	8 February 2022	(United States) Whiteface Mountain	GS	(Australia) Harry Laidlaw	(Canada) Riley Seger	(Germany) Anton Grammel	Results
15	9 February 2022	(United States) Whiteface Mountain	GS	(Australia) Harry Laidlaw	(Canada) Riley Seger	(United States) Brian McLaughlin	Results
16	10 February 2022	(United States) Whiteface Mountain	AC	(Canada) Kyle Alexander	(Czech Republic) Filip Forejtek	(United States) Isaiah Nelson	Results
17	10 February 2022	(United States) Whiteface Mountain	AC	(United States) Isaiah Nelson	(Canada) Liam Wallace	(United States) Cooper Puckett	Results
18	10 February 2022	(United States) Whiteface Mountain	SG	(Canada) Kyle Alexander	(United States) Isaiah Nelson	(Canada) Sam Mulligan	Results
19	10 February 2022	(United States) Whiteface Mountain	SG	(Canada) Kyle Alexander	(Canada) Sam Mulligan	(United States) Isaiah Nelson	Results
20	11 February 2022	(United States) Whiteface Mountain	SL	(United States) Benjamin Ritchie	(Canada) Jordan Asher	(Canada) Liam Wallace	Results
21	12 February 2022	(United States) Whiteface Mountain	SL	(Canada) Liam Wallace	(Canada) Simon Fournier	(United States) Isaiah Nelson	Results
22	14 February 2022	(United States) Burke Mountain	GS	(Australia) Harry Laidlaw	(United Kingdom) Charlie Raposo	(United States) Isaiah Nelson	Results
23	15 February 2022	(United States) Burke Mountain	SL	(Sweden) Fabian Ax Swartz	(Canada) Jordan Asher	(United States) Cooper Puckett	Results
24	23 March 2022	(United States) Sugarloaf	DH	(United States) Jared Goldberg	(Canada) Jeffrey Read	(Canada) Broderick Thompson	Results
25	23 March 2022	(United States) Sugarloaf	DH	(United States) Jared Goldberg	(Canada) Broderick Thompson	(United States) Sam Morse	Results
	24 March 2022	(United States) Sugarloaf	SG	cancelled			
26	26 March 2022	(United States) Sugarloaf	GS	(Canada) Riley Seger	(United States) George Steffey	(United States) Patrick Kenney	Results
27	28 March 2022	(United States) Sugarloaf	SL	(United States) Benjamin Ritchie	(United States) Cooper Puckett	(United States) Bridger Gile	Results

=== Rankings ===
==== Overall ====
Rank	after 27 of 27 races	Points
1	(Canada) Liam Wallace	1.098
2	(Canada) Riley Seger	870
3	(Canada) Sam Mulligan	821
4	(Canada) Kyle Alexander	820
5	(United States) Isaiah Nelson	777

==== Downhill ====
Rank	after 4 of 4 races	Points
1	(Canada) Liam Wallace	330
2	(United States) Jared Goldberg	200
3	(Canada) Kyle Alexander	160
4	(United Kingdom) Roy-Alexander Steudle	157
5	(Canada) Sam Mulligan	150

==== Super-G ====
Rank	after 4 of 4 races	Points
1	(Canada) Kyle Alexander	360
2	(Canada) Riley Seger	265
3	(United States) Isaiah Nelson	235
4	(Canada) Sam Mulligan	192
5	(United States) Cooper Cornelius	142

==== Giant slalom ====
Rank	after 8 of 8 races	Points
1	(Canada) Riley Seger	403
2	(Canada) Liam Wallace	378
3	(Australia) Harry Laidlaw	300
4	(United States) Cooper Cornelius	247
5	(Germany) Anton Grammel	209

==== Slalom ====
Rank	after 8 of 8 races	Points
1	(Canada) Liam Wallace	350
2	(Canada) Asher Jordan	305
3	(Canada) Simon Fournier	260
4	(Canada) Justin Alkier	253
5	(United States) Cooper Cornelius	237

==== Parallel giant slalom ====
Rank	after 1 of 1 races	Points
1	(Sweden) Lukas Ermeskog	100
2	(Canada) Declan McCormack	80
3	(Canada) Liam Wallace	60
4	(Switzerland) Reto Mächler	50
5	(United States) Jacob Dilling	45

==== Alpine combined ====
Rank	after 2 of 2 races	Points
1	(United States) Isaiah Nelson	160
2	(Canada) Kyle Alexander	145
3	(Canada) Liam Wallace (Czech Republic) Filip Forejtek	80
5	(Canada) Sam Mulligan	74

== Women ==
=== Calendar ===
Event key: DH – Downhill, SL – Slalom, GS – Giant slalom, SG – Super giant slalom, AC – Alpine Combined, PG – Parallel giant slalom
Season	Date	Place	Type	Winner	Second	Third	Ref.
	16 November 2021	(United States) Vail	SL	cancelled, moved to Copper Mountain, United States			
	17 November 2021	(United States) Vail	SL	cancelled, moved to Copper Mountain, United States			
1	18 November 2021	(United States) Copper Mountain	GS	(Sweden) Estelle Alphand	(Canada) Britt Richardson	(Italy) Roberta Melesi	Results
2	19 November 2021	(United States) Copper Mountain	GS	(Italy) Federica Brignone	(Sweden) Estelle Alphand	(Italy) Roberta Melesi	Results
3	22 November 2021	(United States) Copper Mountain	SL	(Canada) Kiara Alexander	(United States) Zoe Zimmermann	(United States) Allie Resnick	Results
4	23 November 2021	(United States) Copper Mountain	SL	(United States) Lila Lapanja	(United States) Allie Resnick	(Canada) Kiara Alexander	Results
5	8 December 2021	(Canada) Lake Louise	DH	(Canada) Stephanie Fleckenstein	(United States) Lauren Macuga	(United States) Alix Wilkinson	Results
6	9 December 2021	(Canada) Lake Louise	DH	(Canada) Stephanie Fleckenstein	(Canada) Candace Crawford	(United States) Lauren Macuga	Results
7	10 December 2021	(Canada) Lake Louise	SG	(Canada) Candace Crawford	(United States) Alix Wilkinson	(Canada) Stephanie Fleckenstein	Results
	12 December 2021	(Canada) Panorama	SG	cancelled, Alpine Combined race rescheduled to Whiteface Mountain, United States			
	13 December 2021	(Canada) Panorama	AC	cancelled, Alpine Combined race rescheduled to Whiteface Mountain, United States			
8	13 December 2021	(Canada) Panorama	SG	(United States) Alix Wilkinson	(Canada) Cassidy Gray	(Argentina) Francesca Baruzzi Farriol	Results
9	14 December 2021	(Canada) Panorama	PG	(Canada) Cassidy Gray	(Canada) Justine Lamontagne	(Canada) Sarah Bennett	Results
10	15 December 2021	(Canada) Panorama	GS	(Canada) Cassidy Gray	(United States) Allie Resnick	(United States) Nicola Rountree-Williams	Results
11	16 December 2021	(Canada) Panorama	GS	(Canada) Sarah Bennett	(United States) Allie Resnick	(Norway) Kaja Norbye	Results
12	17 December 2021	(Canada) Panorama	SL	(Canada) Amelia Smart	(United States) Zoe Zimmermann	(United States) Lila Lapanja	Results
13	18 December 2021	(Canada) Panorama	SL	(Canada) Amelia Smart	(United Kingdom) Reece Bell	(Czech Republic) Elese Sommerová	Results
14	8 February 2022	(Canada) Georgian Peaks	GS	(Canada) Britt Richardson	(United States) Allie Resnick	(Canada) Stephanie Fleckenstein	Results
15	9 February 2022	(Canada) Georgian Peaks	GS	(Canada) Britt Richardson	(United States) Allie Resnick	(United States) Ava Sunshine Jemison	Results
16	10 February 2022	(Canada) Osler Bluff	SL	(United States) Lila Lapanja	(Canada) Sarah Bennett	(United States) Ava Sunshine Jemison	Results
17	11 February 2022	(Canada) Osler Bluff	SL	(United States) Ava Sunshine Jemison	(Canada) Kiara Alexander	(Canada) Stephanie Fleckenstein	Results
18	14 February 2022	(United States) Whiteface Mountain	AC	(United States) Ava Sunshine Jemison	(Canada) Arianne Forget	(Canada) Stephanie Fleckenstein	Results
19	14 February 2022	(United States) Whiteface Mountain	SG	(Canada) Candace Crawford	(Canada) Stephanie Fleckenstein	(Canada) Britt Richardson	Results
20	14 February 2022	(United States) Whiteface Mountain	AC	(Canada) Kiara Alexander	(United States) Lila Lapanja	(Canada) Stephanie Fleckenstein	Results
21	14 February 2022	(United States) Whiteface Mountain	SG	(Canada) Britt Richardson	(Canada) Stephanie Fleckenstein	(United States) Ava Sunshine Jemison	Results
22	15 February 2022	(United States) Whiteface Mountain	GS	(United States) Katie Hensien	(United States) Allie Resnick	(Canada) Stephanie Fleckenstein	Results
23	16 February 2022	(United States) Whiteface Mountain	SL	(Canada) Arianne Forget	(United States) Allie Resnick	(Canada) Sarah Bennett	Results
24	23 March 2022	(United States) Sugarloaf	DH	(United States) Isabella Wright	(United States) Jacqueline Wiles	(United States) Keely Cashman	Results
25	23 March 2022	(United States) Sugarloaf	DH	(United States) Isabella Wright	(United States) Keely Cashman	(United States) Tricia Mangan	Results
	25 March 2022	(United States) Sugarloaf	SG	cancelled			
	27 March 2022	(United States) Sugarloaf	GS	cancelled			
26	28 March 2022	(United States) Sugarloaf	SL	(United States) Zoe Zimmermann	(Canada) Amelia Smart	(Norway) Kristiane Bekkestad	Results

=== Rankings ===
==== Overall ====
Rank	after 26 of 26 races	Points
1	(United States) Ava Sunshine Jemison	950
2	(Canada) Stephanie Fleckenstein	908
3	(United States) Allie Resnick	804
4	(Canada) Kiara Alexander	780
5	(Canada) Sarah Bennett	679

==== Downhill ====
Rank	after 4 of 4 races	Points
1	(Canada) Stephanie Fleckenstein	245
2	(United States) Lauren Macuga	230
3	(Canada) Candace Crawford	207
4	(United States) Isabella Wright	200
5	(Canada) Katrina van Soest	157

==== Super-G ====
Rank	after 4 of 4 races	Points
1	(Canada) Candace Crawford	250
2	(Canada) Stephanie Fleckenstein	220
3	(United States) Alix Wilkinson (United States) Lauren Macuga	180
5	(Canada) Sarah Bennett	172

==== Giant slalom ====
Rank	after 7 of 7 races	Points
1	(United States) Allie Resnick	432
2	(Canada) Britt Richardson	378
3	(United States) Ava Sunshine Jemison	217
4	(Canada) Arianne Forget	181
5	(Sweden) Estelle Alphand	180

==== Slalom ====
Rank	after 8 of 8 races	Points
1	(United States) Lila Lapanja	386
2	(Canada) Kiara Alexander	360
3	(United States) Zoe Zimmermann	326
4	(United States) Allie Resnick	307
5	(Canada) Amelia Smart	280

==== Parallel giant slalom ====
Rank	after 1 of 1 races	Points
1	(Canada) Cassidy Gray	100
2	(Canada) Justine Lamontagne	80
3	(Canada) Sarah Bennett	60
4	(United States) Kjersti Moritz	50
5	(Canada) Kiara Alexander	45

==== Alpine combined ====
Rank	after 2 of 2 races	Points
1	(United States) Ava Sunshine Jemison	150
2	(United States) Lila Lapanja	130
3	(Canada) Arianne Forget	125
4	(Canada) Stephanie Fleckenstein	120
5	(Canada) Kiara Alexander	100
