= Christina Ackermann =

German alpine skier

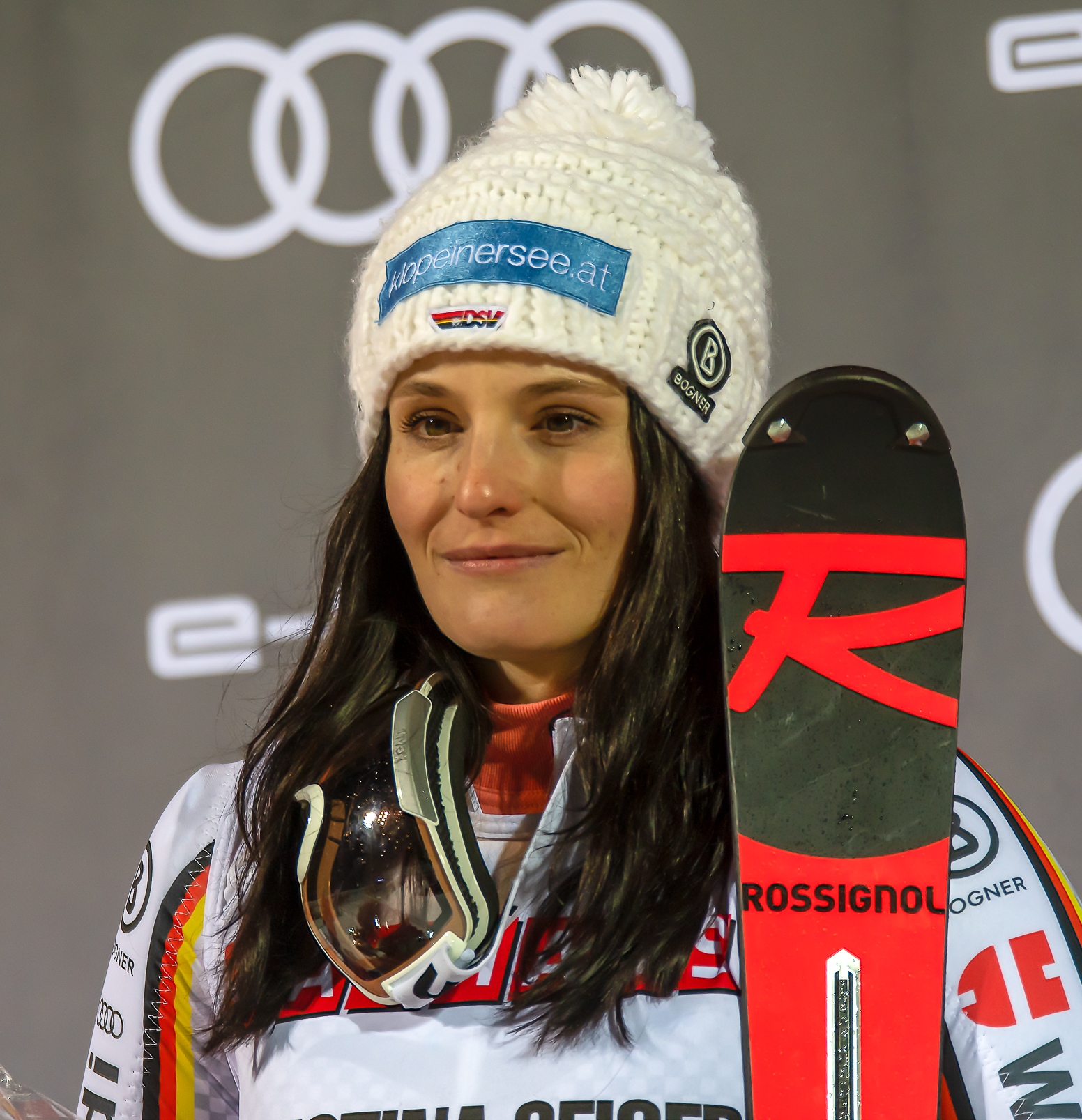
- Geiger in 2019

Personal information
- Born: Christina Geiger; 6 February 1990 (age 36) Oberstdorf, Bavaria, West Germany
- Height: 1.70 m (5 ft 7 in)

Skiing career
- Sport: Alpine skiing
- Club: SC Oberstdorf
- Retired: March 2020 (age 30)
- Disciplines: Slalom
- World Cup debut: 29 December 2008 (age 18)

Olympics
- Teams: 3 – (2010, 2014, 2018)
- Medals: 0

World Championships
- Teams: 4 − (2011–13, 2017–19)
- Medals: 0

World Cup
- Seasons: 12 − (2009–2020)
- Wins: 0
- Podiums: 2 – (1 SL, 1 PS)
- Overall titles: 0 – (30th in 2019)
- Discipline titles: 0 – (8th in SL, 2019)
Medal record
Women's alpine skiing
Representing Germany
Junior World Championships
Gold medal – first place	2010 Mont Blanc	Slalom

Christina Ackermann (born 6 February 1990) is a retired German World Cup alpine ski racer. She specialised in slalom and competed in three Winter Olympics and four World Championships.

Born Christina Geiger in Oberstdorf, Bavaria, she made her World Cup debut in December 2008 and her first podium was a third place in slalom at Semmering in 2010. In her first Olympics in 2010, she was fourteenth in the slalom.

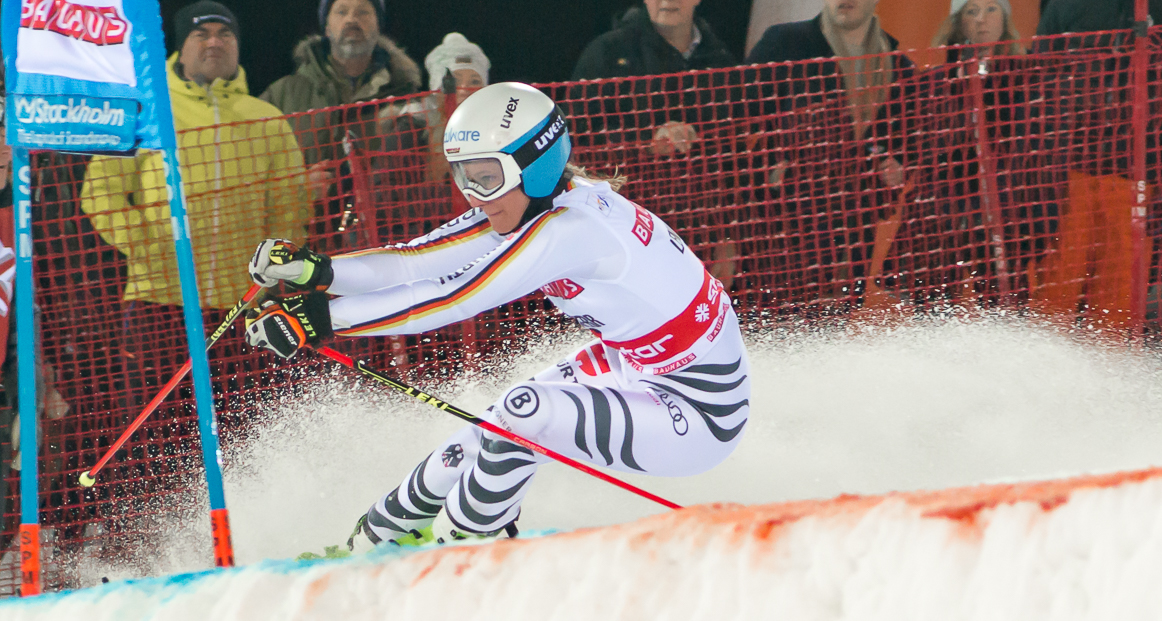
Christina Geiger in Hammarbybacken World Cup 2018

== World Cup results ==
=== Season standings ===
Season	Age	Overall	Slalom	Giant slalom	Super-G	Downhill	Combined
2009	19	98	37	—	—	—	—
2010	20	39	10	—	—	—	—
2011	21	50	17	—	—	—	—
2012	22	44	16	—	—	—	—
2013	23	53	20	—	—	—	—
2014	24	57	20	—	—	—	—
2015	25	83	35	—	—	—	—
2016	26	65	21	—	—	—	—
2017	27	48	14	—	—	—	—
2018	28	44	16	—	—	—	—
2019	29	30	8	—	—	—	—
2020	30	42	9	—	—	—	—

=== Race podiums ===
- 2 podiums – (1 SL 1 PS); 28 top tens

Season	Date	Location	Discipline	Place
2011	29 December 2010	Semmering, Austria	Slalom	3rd
2019	19 February 2019	Stockholm, Sweden	Parallel slalom	2nd

== World Championship results ==
Year	Age	Slalom	Giant slalom	Super-G	Downhill	Combined	Team event
2011	21	DSQ1	—	—	—	—	—
2013	23	DNF1	—	—	—	—	—
2015	25	—	—	—	—	—	—
2017	27	DNF1	—	—	—	—	9
2019	29	DNF2	—	—	—	—	4

== Olympic results ==
Year	Age	Slalom	Giant slalom	Super-G	Downhill	Combined	Team event
2010	20	14	—	—	—	—	not run
2014	24	DSQ1	—	—	—	—	not run
2018	28	DNF2	—	—	—	—	—
