= Zauberberg =

Zauberberg may refer to:

- Der Zauberberg (known in English as The Magic Mountain), a novel by Thomas Mann
- Zauberberg (album), by Gas
- Zauberberg (ski area), Austria
