= Michael Tommy =

Michael Tommy may refer to:

- Michael Tommy (footballer) (born 1979), Sierra Leonean international football goalkeeper
- Michael Tommy (alpine skier) (born 1963), Canadian former alpine skier
