= FIS Alpine World Ski Championships 2015 – Nations team event =

Nations team event at the FIS Alpine World Ski Championships 2015
- Venue: Vail, Colorado, United States
- Date: 10 February 2015
- Teams: 16

Medalists
gold medal	Eva-Maria Brem; Marcel Hirscher; Nicole Hosp; Michaela Kirchgasser; Christoph Nösig; Philipp Schörghofer	Austria
silver medal	Phil Brown; Candace Crawford; Erin Mielzynski; Trevor Philp; Marie-Pier Préfontaine; Erik Read	Canada
bronze medal	Mattias Hargin; Sara Hector; Maria Pietilä Holmner; Markus Larsson; André Myhrer; Anna Swenn-Larsson	Sweden

The Nations team event competition at the 2015 World Championships was held on 10 February 2015.

== FIS Overall Nations Cup standings ==
The participating nations were seeded according to the Overall Nations Cup standings prior to the World Championships:

Rank	Country	Points
1	Austria	7103
2	Italy	3845
3	United States	3428
4	Switzerland	3427
5	France	3045
6	Sweden	2747
7	Germany	2251
8	Norway	2076
9	Slovenia	1206
10	Canada	955
11	Czech Republic	444
12	Russia	398
13	Liechtenstein	300
14	Croatia	294
15	Slovakia	187
16	Finland	121
16	Spain	121
18	Hungary	99
19	Japan	58
20	Great Britain	45
21	Poland	26
22	Andorra	11
23	Monaco	3
–	Argentina	0

Argentina also participated, although as they had no points in the Nations Cup, they were seeded last.

== Participating teams ==
Every nation submitted a team of four to six athletes, with at least two male and two female skiers.

Country	Skiers
1 Austria	Eva-Maria Brem
1 Austria	Nicole Hosp
1 Austria	Michaela Kirchgasser
1 Austria	Marcel Hirscher
1 Austria	Christoph Nösig
1 Austria	Philipp Schörghofer
2 Italy	Chiara Costazza
2 Italy	Francesca Marsaglia
2 Italy	Manuela Mölgg
2 Italy	Giovanni Borsotti
2 Italy	Matteo Marsaglia
2 Italy	Davide Simoncelli
3 United States	Julia Mancuso
3 United States	Paula Moltzan
3 United States	Mikaela Shiffrin
3 United States	Will Brandenburg
3 United States	David Chodounsky
3 United States	Ted Ligety
4 Switzerland	Charlotte Chable
4 Switzerland	Michelle Gisin
4 Switzerland	Wendy Holdener
4 Switzerland	Gino Caviezel
4 Switzerland	Justin Murisier
4 Switzerland	Elia Zurbriggen
5 France	Adeline Baud
5 France	Anemone Marmottan
5 France	Tessa Worley
5 France	Mathieu Faivre
5 France	Thomas Fanara
5 France	Thomas Mermillod-Blondin
6 Sweden	Sara Hector
6 Sweden	Maria Pietilä-Holmner
6 Sweden	Anna Swenn-Larsson
6 Sweden	Mattias Hargin
6 Sweden	Markus Larsson
6 Sweden	André Myhrer
7 Germany	Lena Dürr
7 Germany	Veronique Hronek
7 Germany	Viktoria Rebensburg
7 Germany	Felix Neureuther
7 Germany	Philipp Schmid
7 Germany	Linus Strasser
8 Norway	Nina Løseth
8 Norway	Ragnhild Mowinckel
8 Norway	Sebastian Foss Solevåg
8 Norway	Leif Kristian Haugen

Country	Skiers
9 Slovenia	Ana Bucik
9 Slovenia	Ana Drev
9 Slovenia	Katarina Lavtar
9 Slovenia	Klemen Kosi
9 Slovenia	Žan Kranjec
9 Slovenia	Matic Skube
10 Canada	Candace Crawford
10 Canada	Erin Mielzynski
10 Canada	Marie-Pier Préfontaine
10 Canada	Phil Brown
10 Canada	Trevor Philp
10 Canada	Erik Read
11 Czech Republic	Gabriela Capová
11 Czech Republic	Martina Dubovská
11 Czech Republic	Kateřina Pauláthová
11 Czech Republic	Šárka Strachová
11 Czech Republic	Kryštof Krýzl
11 Czech Republic	Martin Vráblík
12 Russia	Ksenia Alopina
12 Russia	Anastasia Romanova
12 Russia	Aleksander Andrienko
12 Russia	Alexander Khoroshilov
12 Russia	Pavel Trikhichev
13 Croatia	Andrea Komšić
13 Croatia	Sofija Novoselić
13 Croatia	Leona Popović
13 Croatia	Ivica Kostelić
13 Croatia	Natko Zrnčić-Dim
13 Croatia	Filip Zubčić
14 Finland	Kristiina Rove
14 Finland	Merle Soppela
14 Finland	Eemeli Pirinen
14 Finland	Joonas Räsänen
14 Finland	Marcus Sandell
14 Finland	Samu Torsti
15 Great Britain	Charlotte Guest
15 Great Britain	Alexandra Tilley
15 Great Britain	Charlie Raposo
15 Great Britain	Dave Ryding
16 Argentina	Salomé Báncora
16 Argentina	Nicol Gastaldi
16 Argentina	Tomas Birkner de Miguel
16 Argentina	Sebastiano Gastaldi

== Bracket ==
Round of 16
1	Austria	4
16	Argentina	0
8	Norway	3
9	Slovenia	1
5	France	3
12	Russia	1
4	Switzerland	2
13	Croatia	2
3	United States	3
14	Finland	1
6	Sweden	4
11	Czech Republic	1
7	Germany	2
10	Canada	2
2	Italy	3
15	Great Britain	1

Quarterfinals
1	Austria	3
8	Norway	1
5	France	1
4	Switzerland	3
3	United States	1
6	Sweden	3
10	Canada	3
2	Italy	1

Semifinals
1	Austria	3
4	Switzerland	1
6	Sweden	2
10	Canada	2

Final
1	Austria	3
10	Canada	1
Third place
4	Switzerland	1
6	Sweden	3

== Results ==
=== Round of 16 ===
Team 1	Score	Team 2
Austria	4:0	Argentina
Brem 23.18	4:0	Báncora 24.29
Hirscher 22.14	4:0	S. Gastaldi 23.33
Kirchgasser 23.64	4:0	N. Gastaldi 24.80
Nösig 22.36	4:0	Birkner de Miguel DNF
Norway	3:1	Slovenia
Mowinckel 23.93	3:1	Lavtar 24.06
Foss-Solevåg 22.75	3:1	Kranjec 22.67
Løseth 24.00	3:1	Bucik 24.01
Haugen 22.67	3:1	Skube 23.64
France	3:1	Russia
Baud 23.47	3:1	Romanova 24.00
Mermillod Blondin 22.68	3:1	Khoroshilov 22.55
Worley 24.17	3:1	Alopina 24.69
Faivre 22.51	3:1	Trikhichev DNF
Switzerland	2:2	Croatia
Holdener 23.47	2:2	Popović DSQ
Caviezel 22.65	2:2	Kostelić 22.99
Gisin 24.19	2:2	Novošelić 24.14
Murisier 22.86	2:2	Zubčić 22.55

Team 1	Score	Team 2
United States	3:1	Finland
Moltzan 24.04	3:1	Rove 24.27
Chodounsky 22.64	3:1	Pirinen 23.31
Shiffrin 24.08	3:1	Soppela 24.16
Ligety 22.76	3:1	Rasanen 22.69
Sweden	4:1	Czech Republic
Pietilä-Holmner 24.06	4:1	Strachová 24.06
Hargin 22.39	4:1	Vráblík 22.97
Swenn-Larsson 23.86	4:1	Pauláthová 24.02
Myhrer 22.80	4:1	Krýzl DSQ
Germany	2:2	Canada
Hronek DSQ	2:2	Mielzynski 23.61
Strasser 22.66	2:2	Brown 22.64
Rebensburg 23.89	2:2	Crawford DSQ
Neureuther 22.27	2:2	Philp 22.50
Italy	3:1	(United Kingdom) Great Britain
Costazza 24.15	3:1	Tilley 30.76
Borsotti 23.27	3:1	Ryding 22.54
F. Marsaglia 24.50	3:1	Guest 24.55
M. Marsaglia 23.43	3:1	Raposo 23.51

=== Quarterfinals ===
Team 1	Score	Team 2
Austria	3:1	Norway
Brem 23.59	3:1	Løseth 23.98
Hirscher 22.50	3:1	Haugen 22.68
Kirchgasser 24.04	3:1	Mowinckel 24.10
Nösig 22.75	3:1	Foss-Solevåg 22.60
France	1:3	Switzerland
Baud 23.54	1:3	Gisin 24.09
Mermillod Blondin 23.06	1:3	Caviezel 22.48
Marmottan DSQ	1:3	Holdener 23.53
Faivre 23.24	1:3	Murisier 23.05

Team 1	Score	Team 2
United States	1:3	Sweden
Moltzan DNF	1:3	Swenn-Larsson 24.08
Chodounsky DNF	1:3	Myhrer 22.67
Shiffrin 23.82	1:3	Pietilä-Holmner 23.85
Ligety DSQ	1:3	Hargin 22.66
Canada	3:1	Italy
Mielzynski 24.00	3:1	F. Marsaglia 24.56
Brown 23.07	3:1	Borsotti DSQ
Crawford 24.15	3:1	Costazza 24.01
Philp 22.89	3:1	M. Marsaglia DSQ

=== Semifinals ===
Team 1	Score	Team 2
Austria	3:1	Switzerland
Brem 24.24	3:1	Gisin 24.36
Hirscher 22.36	3:1	Caviezel 22.51
Kirchgasser 23.71	3:1	Holdener 23.62
Nösig 22.78	3:1	Murisier 22.87

Team 1	Score	Team 2
Sweden	2:2	Canada
Pietilä-Holmner 24.28	2:2	Mielzynski 23.57
Hargin 22.49	2:2	Brown 22.80
Swenn-Larsson 24.15	2:2	Crawford 24.03
Myhrer 22.34	2:2	Philp 22.71

=== Small Final ===
Team 1	Score	Team 2
Switzerland	1:3	Sweden
Holdener DSQ	1:3	Swenn-Larsson 23.83
Caviezel 22.53	1:3	Myhrer 22.46
Gisin 24.28	1:3	Pietilä-Holmner 24.21
Murisier 22.60	1:3	Hargin 22.83

=== Big Final ===
Team 1	Score	Team 2
Austria	3:1	Canada
Brem 23.94	3:1	Mielzynski 23.68
Hirscher 22.38	3:1	Brown 22.77
Kirchgasser 23.97	3:1	Crawford 24.10
Nösig 22.84	3:1	Philp 22.95
