= Candace Crawford =

Canadian alpine skier (born 1994)

Personal information
- Born: March 11, 1994 (age 32)

Skiing career
- Sport: Alpine skiing
- Disciplines: Slalom

World Championships
- Teams: 1 (2015)
- Medals: 1 (0 gold)
Medal record
World Championships
Silver medal – second place	2015 Beaver Creek	Team event

Candace Crawford (born March 11, 1994) is a Canadian alpine skier. Candace's home ski club is the Georgian Peaks Club in Thornbury, Ontario. Her younger brother Jack is also an alpine skier.

Crawford competed in the World Cup the first time in slalom in Sölden in October 2014. She earned her first World Cup points in Kühtai's slalom in December 2014 for being 25th.

Crawford was part of the Canadian alpine skiing team that won the silver medal in the Nations Team Event at the 2015 FIS Alpine World Ski Championships in Vail and Beaver Creek, Colorado. Crawford competed on a team with Erin Mielzynski, Phil Brown, Trevor Philp and the substitutes Marie-Pier Préfontaine and Erik Read. The Canadian team was seeded only as the 10th team before the event, but managed to eliminate higher-seeded teams Germany (7), Italy (2), and Sweden (6) during the competition before only losing in the final to the favorites from Austria (1).

At the end of that season, she won the 2014-15 Nor-Am Cup overall women's ranking, ahead of fellow Canadian teammate Mikaela Tommy and American Paula Moltzan. She also won the individual rankings in slalom and giant slalom and finished second in super-G.
