= Jean Pazzi =

French alpine skier (1920–1982)

Personal information
- Nationality: French
- Born: 7 August 1920; Guillaumes, France
- Died: 22 December 1982 (aged 62); Péone, France

Sport
- Sport: Alpine skiing

Jean Pazzi (7 August 1920 – 22 December 1982) was a French alpine skier. He competed in the men's downhill at the 1948 Winter Olympics.
