= Thomas Mermillod-Blondin =

French alpine skier (born 1984)

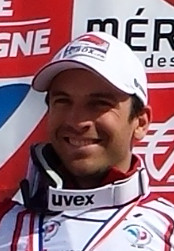
- Mermillod-Blondin in 2014

Personal information
- Born: 3 January 1984 (age 42) Annecy, Haute Savoie, France
- Height: 176 cm (5 ft 9 in)
- Website: thomasmermillod.com

Skiing career
- Sport: Alpine skiing
- Club: Douanes SC Grand Bornand
- Retired: 22 February 2019 (age 35)
- Disciplines: Super-G, Combined, Downhill, Slalom
- World Cup debut: 6 January 2007 (age 23)

Olympics
- Teams: 2 – (2010, 2014)
- Medals: 0

World Championships
- Teams: 3 – (2009, 2013, 2015)
- Medals: 0

World Cup
- Seasons: 9 – (2008–16)
- Wins: 0
- Podiums: 6 – (1 SG, 5 SC)
- Overall titles: 0 – (28th in 2014)
- Discipline titles: 0 – (2nd in SC in 2016)

Thomas Mermillod-Blondin (born 3 January 1984) is a former World Cup alpine ski racer from France. Born in Annecy, Haute-Savoie, he primarily competed in super-G, but his best results were in the super combined event: he took five of his six World Cup podiums in combined, with the other coming in super-G. Mermillod-Blondin made his World Cup debut in 2007 and represented France at the 2010 Winter Olympics in Vancouver and the 2011 World Championships. He made a total of 179 World Cup starts in his career. In February 2019 Mermillod-Blondin announced that he would retire from competition following a combined race in Bansko, Bulgaria that month.

== World Cup results ==
=== Season standings ===
Season	Age	Overall	Slalom	Giant slalom	Super-G	Downhill	Combined
2008	24	113	60	43	—	—	—
2009	25	86	37	43	—	—	28
2010	26	69	44	25	—	—	29
2011	27	61	44	34	—	—	11
2012	28	60	39	39	62	—	11
2013	29	31	38	32	22	—	3
2014	30	28	—	30	8	—	3
2015	31	78	—	—	31	—	17
2016	32	40	48	—	29	50	2
2017	33	injured					
2018	34	118	—	—	—	—	24
2019	35	111	—	—	—	—	13

=== World Cup podiums ===
- 6 podiums – (4 SC, 1 K, 1 SG)

Season	Date	Location	Discipline	Place
2011	26 Feb 2011	Bansko, Bulgaria	Super combined	3rd
2012	12 Feb 2012	Sochi, Russia	Super combined	3rd
2013	27 Jan 2013	Kitzbühel, Austria	Combined	3rd
2014	13 Mar 2014	Lenzerheide, Switzerland	Super G	2nd
2016	22 Jan 2016	Kitzbühel, Austria	Super combined	3rd
2016	19 Feb 2016	Chamonix, France	Super combined	3rd

== World Championship results ==
Year	Age	Slalom	Giant slalom	Super-G	Downhill	Combined
2009	25	—	—	—	—	6
2011	27	—	—	—	—	—
2013	29	—	—	21	—	DSQ2
2015	31	—	—	—	—	9

== Olympic results ==
Year	Age	Slalom	Giant slalom	Super-G	Downhill	Combined
2010	26	21	DNF1	—	—	19
2014	30	—	—	15	—	DNF2
