= Annie Laurendeau =

Canadian alpine skier (born 1968)

Annie Laurendeau (born 10 September 1968) is a Canadian former alpine skier who competed in the 1992 Winter Olympics.
