= 2015–16 FIS Alpine Ski World Cup =

International sports competition

2015–16 FIS Alpine Ski World Cup champions
Discipline	Men	Women
Overall	(Austria) Marcel Hirscher	(Switzerland) Lara Gut
Downhill	(Italy) Peter Fill	(United States) Lindsey Vonn
Super-G	(Norway) Aleksander Aamodt Kilde	(Switzerland) Lara Gut
Giant slalom	(Austria) Marcel Hirscher	(Austria) Eva-Maria Brem
Slalom	(Norway) Henrik Kristoffersen	(Sweden) Frida Hansdotter
Alpine combined	(France) Alexis Pinturault	(Switzerland) Wendy Holdener
Nations Cup	Austria	Austria
- Nations Cup Overall: Austria

Competition
Locations	21 venues	20 venues
Individual	44 events	40 events
Mixed	1 event	1 event
Cancelled	1 events	—
Rescheduled	4 events	11 events

The International Ski Federation (FIS) Alpine World Cup tour is the premier circuit for alpine skiing competition. The inaugural season launched in January 1967, and the 2016 season marked the 50th consecutive year for the FIS. This World Cup season began on 24 October 2015, in Sölden, Austria, and concluded in Saint Moritz, Switzerland on 20 March 2016. The World Ski Championship, a biennial event, did not interrupt this competitive season, and the upcoming World Championships were held Saint Moritz, Switzerland in February 2017

== Men ==
Summary

Men's overall champion

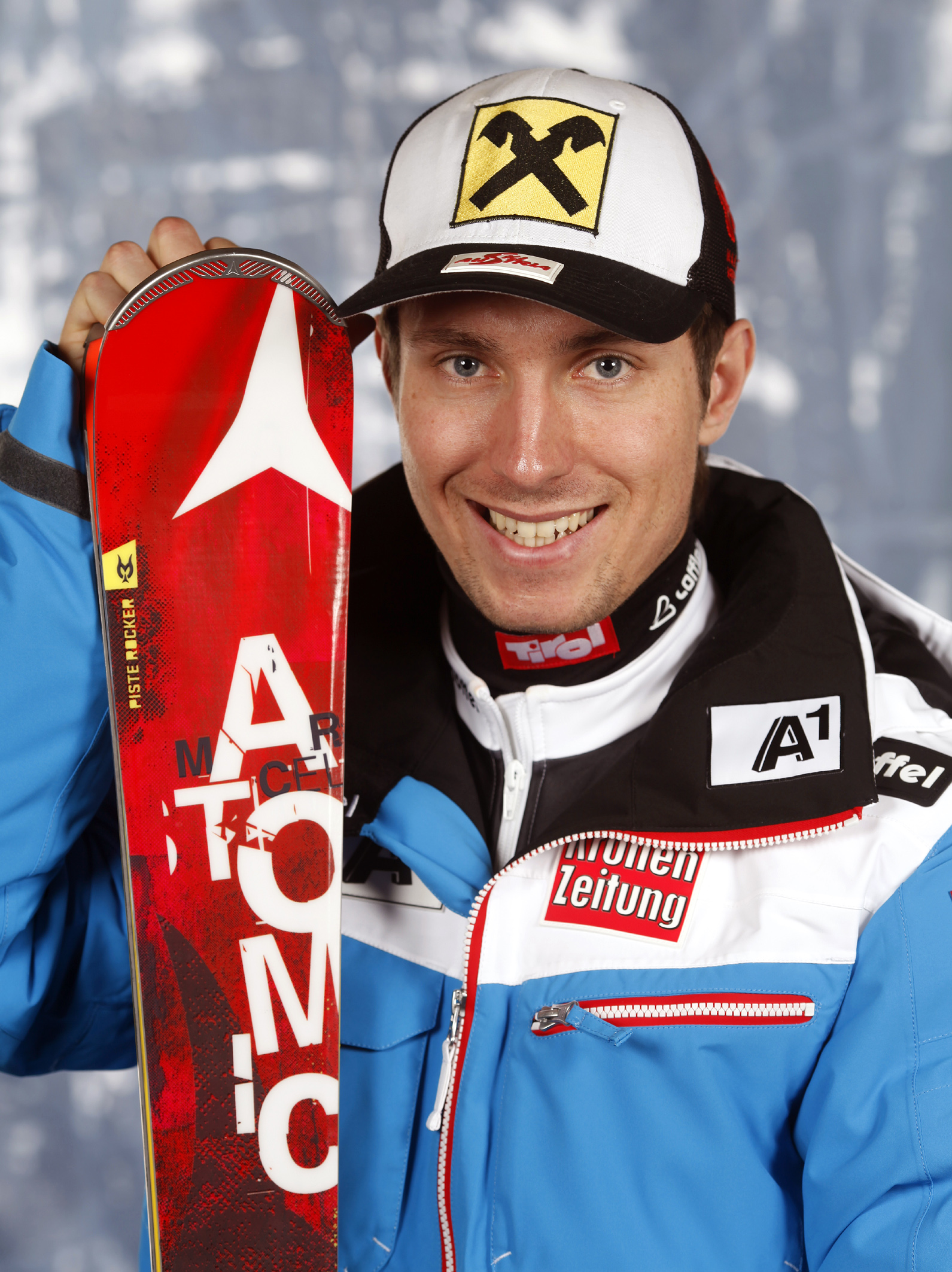
Marcel Hirscher won the overall title for the fifth successive year.

By late December 2015, the season had seen year-ending injuries to two top skiers. Austrian Matthias Mayer suffered severe spinal damage in the downhill competition at Gröden in Val Gardena, Italy, and German Josef Ferstl damaged his knee during training in Santa Caterina, Italy on the downhill course. Despite his broken back, Mayer is optimistic about returning for a 2017 World Cup try following his much debated crash. During the crash that injured Mayer, another World Cup first took place when the 'body airbag' he was wearing inflated. The new protective gear, now worn by many skiers, has never been deployed during a World Cup competition prior to this. The system is designed to minimize severe thoracic injuries, like the one Mayer suffered, by deploying quickly during tumbles and mishap. Emergency responders could see that the "airbag" had engaged as designed before they even knew about the broken spine. It has not been determined if the "protective gear" prevented worse injury, promoted the injury that was received, or had no effect in the matter.

An odd incident marred the early season as a small, remotely-piloted camera helicopter, operated by broadcast media, nearly foiled Marcel Hirscher's podium effort by crashing during his run and narrowly missing him. A day after the incident, the International Ski Federation adopted the policy of banning remotely-piloted vehicles from flying over their events as a matter of safety and concern for the welfare of their athletes, staff and viewers. Senior Race Director Markus Waldner stated his displeasure with the occurrence and insisted that the ban will remain in effect as long as he is on the job. The newly introduced parallel giant slalom event at Alta Badia, Italy, was a relatively short Giant slalom course that pitted the men against one another in a modified bracket-reduction format from thirty-two 1st run skiers, to sixteen 2nd bracket skiers that eventually dwindled to just four final round racers. The Snow Queen Trophy slalom planned for Sljême, Croatia was cancelled and diverted to Santa Caterina, Italy for lack of snow, while the early season slalom in Levi, Finland suffered similar conditions, but could not find a home to reschedule to in the very busy year.

By mid-season, the World Cup overall leader, as well as Downhill and Super-G discipline leader, Aksel Lund Svindal was out following a crash during the downhill at Kitzbühel. He suffered a season-ending injury to his right knee and needed immediate surgery. Georg Streitberger of Austria also suffered a season-ending knee injury in the same race, which was ended after only thirty skiers left the starting gate. Poor visibility, and the number of serious crashes that were occurring, prompted race officials to halt the event at the minimum skiers required to have it qualify as a complete event.

=== Calendar ===
Event key: DH – Downhill, SL – Slalom, GS – Giant slalom, SG – Super giant slalom, AC – Alpine combined, CE – City Event (Parallel), PG – Parallel giant slalom
#	Event	Date	Venue	Type	Winner	Second	Third	Details
1593	1	25 October 2015	(Austria) Sölden	GS_{380}	(United States) Ted Ligety	(France) Thomas Fanara	(Austria) Marcel Hirscher	
		15 November 2015	(Finland) Levi	SL _{cnx}	lack of snow			
1594	2	28 November 2015	(Canada) Lake Louise	DH_{452}	(Norway) Aksel Lund Svindal	(Italy) Peter Fill	(United States) Travis Ganong	
1595	3	29 November 2015	(Canada) Lake Louise	SG_{185}	(Norway) Aksel Lund Svindal	(Austria) Matthias Mayer	(Italy) Peter Fill	
1596	4	4 December 2015	(United States) Beaver Creek	DH_{453}	(Norway) Aksel Lund Svindal	(Norway) Kjetil Jansrud	(France) Guillermo Fayed	
1597	5	5 December 2015	(United States) Beaver Creek	SG_{186}	(Austria) Marcel Hirscher	(United States) Ted Ligety	(United States) Andrew Weibrecht	
1598	6	6 December 2015	(United States) Beaver Creek	GS_{381}	(Austria) Marcel Hirscher	(France) Victor Muffat-Jeandet	(Norway) Henrik Kristoffersen	
1599	7	12 December 2015	(France) Val-d'Isère	GS_{382}	(Austria) Marcel Hirscher	(Germany) Felix Neureuther	(France) Victor Muffat-Jeandet	
1600	8	13 December 2015	(France) Val-d'Isère	SL_{450}	(Norway) Henrik Kristoffersen	(Austria) Marcel Hirscher	(Germany) Felix Neureuther	
1601	9	18 December 2015	(Italy) Val Gardena	SG_{187}	(Norway) Aksel Lund Svindal	(Norway) Kjetil Jansrud	(Norway) Aleksander Aamodt Kilde	
1602	10	19 December 2015	(Italy) Val Gardena	DH_{454}	(Norway) Aksel Lund Svindal	(France) Guillermo Fayed	(Norway) Kjetil Jansrud	
1603	11	20 December 2015	(Italy) Alta Badia	GS_{383}	(Austria) Marcel Hirscher	(Norway) Henrik Kristoffersen	(France) Victor Muffat-Jeandet	
1604	12	21 December 2015	(Italy) Alta Badia	PG_{001}	(Norway) Kjetil Jansrud	(Norway) Aksel Lund Svindal	(Sweden) André Myhrer	
1605	13	22 December 2015	(Italy) Madonna di Campiglio	SL_{451}	(Norway) Henrik Kristoffersen	(Austria) Marcel Hirscher	(Austria) Marco Schwarz	
1606	14	29 December 2015	(Italy) Santa Caterina	DH_{455}	(France) Adrien Théaux	(Austria) Hannes Reichelt	(France) David Poisson	
1607	15	6 January 2016	(Italy) Santa Caterina	SL_{452}	(Austria) Marcel Hirscher	(Norway) Henrik Kristoffersen	(Russia) Aleksandr Khoroshilov	
		1 January 2016	(Germany) Munich	CE_{cnx}	pre-season organizational issues; replaced in Stockholm on 23 February 2016			
		6 January 2016	(Croatia) Zagreb	SL_{cnx}	warm temperatures and lack of snow; replaced in Santa Caterina on 6 January 2016			
		9 January 2016	(Switzerland) Adelboden	GS_{cnx}	dense fog and inclement weather; replaced in Hinterstoder on 26 February 2016			
1608	16	10 January 2016	(Switzerland) Adelboden	SL_{453}	(Norway) Henrik Kristoffersen	(Austria) Marcel Hirscher	(Russia) Aleksandr Khoroshilov	
1609	17	15 January 2016	(Switzerland) Wengen	AC_{123}	(Norway) Kjetil Jansrud	(Norway) Aksel Lund Svindal	(France) Adrien Théaux	
1610	18	16 January 2016	(Switzerland) Wengen	DH_{456}	(Norway) Aksel Lund Svindal	(Austria) Hannes Reichelt	(Austria) Klaus Kröll	
1611	19	17 January 2016	(Switzerland) Wengen	SL_{454}	(Norway) Henrik Kristoffersen	(Italy) Giuliano Razzoli	(Italy) Stefano Gross	
1612	20	22 January 2016	(Austria) Kitzbühel	SG_{188}	(Norway) Aksel Lund Svindal	(United States) Andrew Weibrecht	(Austria) Hannes Reichelt	
1613	21	22 January 2016	(Austria) Kitzbühel	AC_{124}	(France) Alexis Pinturault	(France) Victor Muffat-Jeandet	(France) Thomas Mermillod-Blondin	
1614	22	23 January 2016	(Austria) Kitzbühel	DH_{457}	(Italy) Peter Fill	(Switzerland) Beat Feuz	(Switzerland) Carlo Janka	
1615	23	24 January 2016	(Austria) Kitzbühel	SL_{455}	(Norway) Henrik Kristoffersen	(Austria) Marcel Hirscher	(Germany) Fritz Dopfer	
1616	24	26 January 2016	(Austria) Schladming	SL_{456}	(Norway) Henrik Kristoffersen	(Austria) Marcel Hirscher	(Russia) Aleksandr Khoroshilov	
1617	25	30 January 2016	(Germany) Garmsich-Partenkirchen	DH_{458}	(Norway) Aleksander Aamodt Kilde	(Slovenia) Boštjan Kline	(Switzerland) Beat Feuz	
		31 January 2016	(Germany) Garmsich-Partenkirchen	GS_{cnx}	humid, pouring rain and dense fog; replaced in Kranjska Gora on 4 March 2016			
1618	26	6 February 2016	(South Korea) Jeongseon	DH_{459}	(Norway) Kjetil Jansrud	(Italy) Dominik Paris	(United States) Steven Nyman	
1619	27	7 February 2016	(South Korea) Jeongseon	SG_{189}	(Switzerland) Carlo Janka	(Italy) Christof Innerhofer	(Austria) Vincent Kriechmayr	
1620	28	13 February 2016	(Japan) Yuzawa Naeba	GS_{384}	(France) Alexis Pinturault	(France) Mathieu Faivre	(Italy) Massimiliano Blardone	
1621	29	14 February 2016	(Japan) Yuzawa Naeba	SL_{457}	(Germany) Felix Neureuther	(Sweden) André Myhrer	(Austria) Marco Schwarz	
1622	30	19 February 2016	(France) Chamonix	AC_{125}	(France) Alexis Pinturault	(Italy) Dominik Paris	(France) Thomas Mermillod-Blondin	
1623	31	20 February 2016	(France) Chamonix	DH_{460}	(Italy) Dominik Paris	(United States) Steven Nyman	(Switzerland) Beat Feuz	
1624	32	23 February 2016	(Sweden) Stockholm	CE_{005}	(Austria) Marcel Hirscher	(Sweden) André Myhrer	(Italy) Stefano Gross	
1625	33	26 February 2016	(Austria) Hinterstoder	GS_{385}	(France) Alexis Pinturault	(Austria) Marcel Hirscher	(France) Thomas Fanara	
1626	34	27 February 2016	(Austria) Hinterstoder	SG_{190}	(Norway) Aleksander Aamodt Kilde	(Slovenia) Boštjan Kline	(Austria) Marcel Hirscher	
1627	35	28 February 2016	(Austria) Hinterstoder	GS_{386}	(France) Alexis Pinturault	(Austria) Marcel Hirscher	(Norway) Henrik Kristoffersen	
1628	36	4 March 2016	(Slovenia) Kranjska Gora	GS_{387}	(France) Alexis Pinturault	(Austria) Philipp Schörghofer	(Austria) Marcel Hirscher	
1629	37	5 March 2016	(Slovenia) Kranjska Gora	GS_{388}	(Austria) Marcel Hirscher	(France) Alexis Pinturault	(Norway) Henrik Kristoffersen	
1630	38	6 March 2016	(Slovenia) Kranjska Gora	SL_{458}	(Austria) Marcel Hirscher	(Norway) Henrik Kristoffersen	(Italy) Stefano Gross	
1631	39	12 March 2016	(Norway) Kvitfjell	DH_{461}	(Italy) Dominik Paris	(France) Valentin Giraud Moine	(United States) Steven Nyman	
1632	40	13 March 2016	(Norway) Kvitfjell	SG_{191}	(Norway) Kjetil Jansrud	(Austria) Vincent Kriechmayr	(Italy) Dominik Paris	
1633	41	16 March 2016	(Switzerland) St. Moritz	DH_{462}	(Switzerland) Beat Feuz	(United States) Steven Nyman	(Canada) Erik Guay	
1634	42	17 March 2016	(Switzerland) St. Moritz	SG_{192}	(Switzerland) Beat Feuz	(Norway) Kjetil Jansrud (Norway) Aleksander Aamodt Kilde		
1635	43	19 March 2016	(Switzerland) St. Moritz	GS_{389}	(France) Thomas Fanara	(France) Alexis Pinturault	(France) Mathieu Faivre	
1636	44	20 March 2016	(Switzerland) St. Moritz	SL_{459}	(Sweden) Andre Myhrer	(Austria) Marcel Hirscher	(Norway) Sebastian Foss-Solevåg	

=== Rankings ===
Overall

Rank	after all 44 races	Points
1	(Austria) Marcel Hirscher	1795
2	(Norway) Henrik Kristoffersen	1298
3	(France) Alexis Pinturault	1200
4	(Norway) Kjetil Jansrud	1161
5	(Norway) Aksel Lund Svindal	916

Main article: 2016 Men's overall

Downhill

Rank	after all 11 races	Points
1	(Italy) Peter Fill	462
2	(Norway) Aksel Lund Svindal	436
3	(Italy) Dominik Paris	432
3	(Norway) Kjetil Jansrud	432
5	(Switzerland) Beat Feuz	414

Main article: 2016 Men's downhill

Super G

Rank	after all 8 races	Points
1	(Norway) Aleksander Aamodt Kilde	415
2	(Norway) Kjetil Jansrud	375
3	(Norway) Aksel Lund Svindal	310
4	(Austria) Vincent Kriechmayr	298
5	(Switzerland) Carlo Janka	259

Main article: 2016 Men's super-G

Giant slalom

Rank	after all 11 races	Points
1	(Austria) Marcel Hirscher	766
2	(France) Alexis Pinturault	690
3	(Norway) Henrik Kristoffersen	487
4	(France) Mathieu Faivre	423
5	(France) Victor Muffat-Jeandet	405

Main article: 2016 Men's giant slalom

Slalom

Rank	after all 11 races	Points
1	(Norway) Henrik Kristoffersen	811
2	(Austria) Marcel Hirscher	780
3	(Germany) Felix Neureuther	389
4	(Sweden) André Myhrer	367
5	(Russia) Alexander Khoroshilov	358

Main article: 2016 Men's slalom

Alpine combined

Rank	after all 3 races	Points
1	(France) Alexis Pinturault	220
2	(France) Thomas Mermillod-Blondin	170
3	(Norway) Kjetil Jansrud	165
4	(Italy) Dominik Paris	161
5	(France) Victor Muffat-Jeandet	130

Main article: 2016 Men's combined

== Women ==
Summary

Women's overall champion

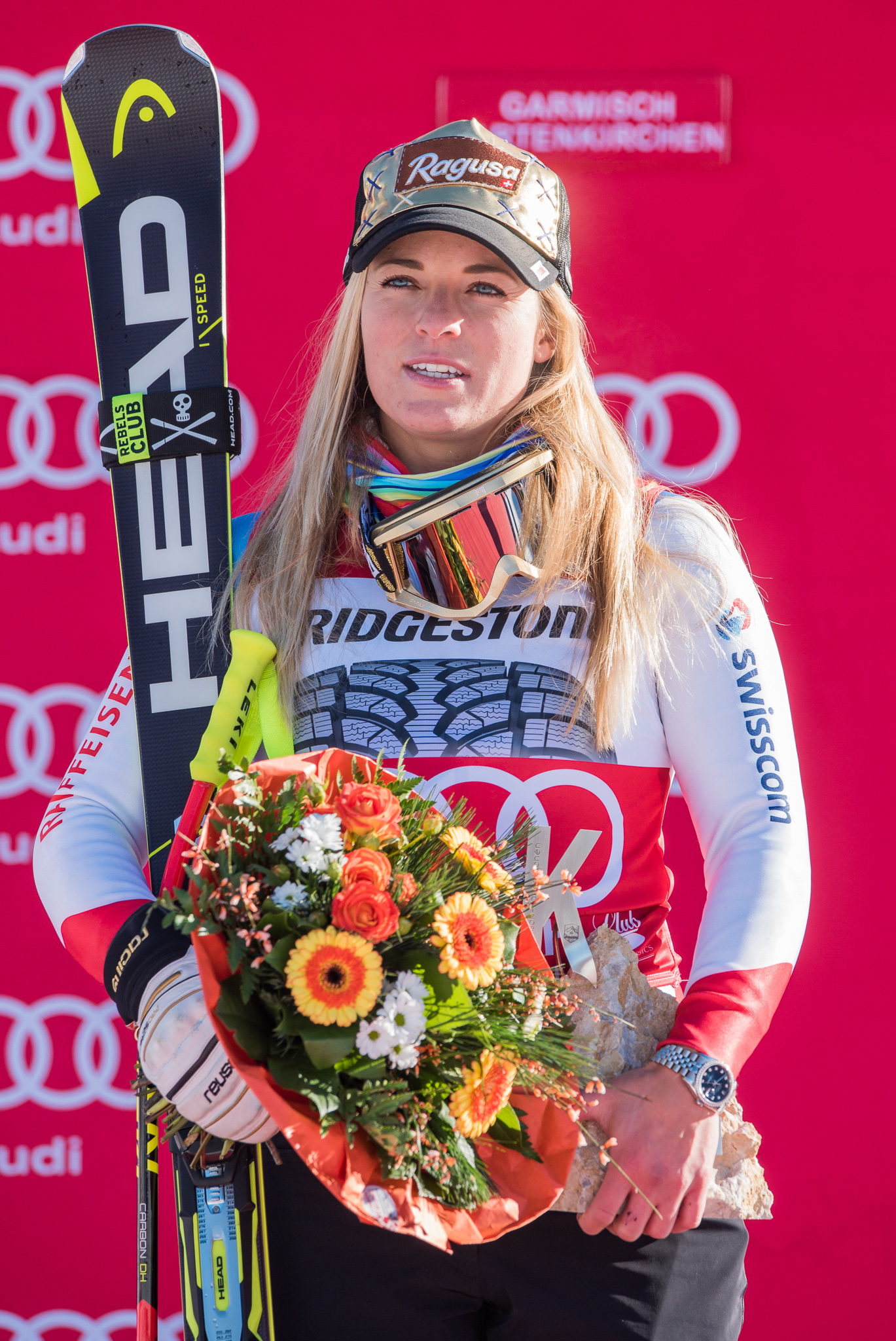
Lara Gut. First Swiss female to capture the Overall since 1995.

The first part of the season produced many injuries to several top skiers. Sara Hector severely injured her knee in giant slalom, during the competition in Åre, Sweden, and two event champions from the previous season, Lindsey Vonn and Mikaela Shiffrin missed several events due to recent incidents. Vonn missed the October and November events to continue rehabilitating from last year's season-ending injury, and from a recent dog bite from one of her pets. Shiffrin dropped-out in mid-December to recuperate from an injury suffered during practice at Åre. Shiffrin's recovery was not immediate and she missed the heart of the race season, however, she returned to the circuit in mid-February and promptly dominated the competition. The lack of snowy weather eliminated the women's race weekend at St. Anton's, Austria, two weeks before the planned event. Officials recognized that they did not have enough snow on the ground, and that they did not have the ability to generate enough man-made snow for safe racing. The events were quickly relocated to Zauchensee, Austria, for the same dates. A few days later, officials cancelled the Snow Queen Trophy slalom planned at Sljême, Croatia. The stop was the only one planned for Croatia this season, and was one of the few joint stops on tour where male and female teammates crossed paths during the year. The slalom event was quickly rescheduled to Santa Caterina, Italy on consecutive days.

The middle of the season saw a significant reshuffle of many of the events throughout The Alps. Six events were cancelled in January for unseasonably warm weather and insufficient snow. The events were promptly repositioned to snowier venues further down the schedule. In contrast, mid-February saw a few events abandoned due to soft and excessive snow, over two meters in one instance... a significant safety concern for the high speed disciplines. At the end of the February, during the Super-G in Soldeu, Vonn, having just returned from injury seven weeks earlier, crashed again while leading near the end of her run. She raced the next day in the Combined event, earned a few points, then ended her season on Monday after a complete medical evaluation in Barcelona revealed several hairline fractures in her knee. At the time of her departure, she had already won the downhill discipline for the season and was leading the overall, super-G and combined disciplines.

Notable skiers that did not participate this year include: Anna Fenninger, the defending World Cup champion who was forced to skip the season due to a serious knee injury. Tina Maze, last season's runner-up decided to take a short hiatus during the 2016 season before permanently deciding to continue, or end, her World Cup career. Champion skier Julia Mancuso decided to opt for hip surgery in November, 2015, instead of rushing back after non-surgical therapy failed to give her the full recovery she had hoped for. Her stated goal is to get back to winning form in time to qualify for the 2018 Winter Olympics in South Korea.

=== Calendar ===
Event key: DH – Downhill, SL – Slalom, GS – Giant slalom, SG – Super giant slalom, AC – Alpine combined, CE – City Event (Parallel)
#	Event	Date	Venue	Type	Winner	Second	Third	Details
1487	1	24 October 2015	(Austria) Sölden	GS_{379}	(Italy) Federica Brignone	(United States) Mikaela Shiffrin	(Liechtenstein) Tina Weirather	
		14 November 2015	(Finland) Levi	SL_{cnx}	lack of snow; replaced in Aspen on 28 November 2015			
1488	2	27 November 2015	(United States) Aspen	GS_{380}	(Switzerland) Lara Gut	(Austria) Eva-Maria Brem	(Italy) Federica Brignone	
1489	3	28 November 2015	(United States) Aspen	SL_{427}	(United States) Mikaela Shiffrin	(Slovakia) Veronika Velez-Zuzulová	(Sweden) Frida Hansdotter	
1490	4	29 November 2015	(United States) Aspen	SL_{428}	(United States) Mikaela Shiffrin	(Sweden) Frida Hansdotter	(Czech Republic) Šárka Strachová	
1491	5	4 December 2015	(Canada) Lake Louise	DH_{377}	(United States) Lindsey Vonn	(Austria) Cornelia Hütter	(Austria) Ramona Siebenhofer	
1492	6	5 December 2015	(Canada) Lake Louise	DH_{378}	(United States) Lindsey Vonn	(Switzerland) Fabienne Suter	(Austria) Cornelia Hütter	
1493	7	6 December 2015	(Canada) Lake Louise	SG_{204}	(United States) Lindsey Vonn	(Austria) Tamara Tippler	(Austria) Cornelia Hütter	
1494	8	12 December 2015	(Sweden) Åre	GS_{381}	(United States) Lindsey Vonn	(Austria) Eva-Maria Brem	(Italy) Federica Brignone	
1495	9	13 December 2015	(Sweden) Åre	SL_{429}	(Slovakia) Petra Vlhová	(Sweden) Frida Hansdotter	(Norway) Nina Løseth	
1496	10	18 December 2015	(France) Val-d'Isère	AC_{096}	(Switzerland) Lara Gut	(United States) Lindsey Vonn	(Austria) Michaela Kirchgasser	
1497	11	19 December 2015	(France) Val-d'Isère	DH_{379}	(Switzerland) Lara Gut	(Switzerland) Fabienne Suter	(Canada) Larisa Yurkiw	
1498	12	20 December 2015	(France) Courchevel	GS_{382}	(Austria) Eva-Maria Brem	(Switzerland) Lara Gut (Norway) Nina Løseth		
1499	13	28 December 2015	(Austria) Lienz	GS_{383}	(Switzerland) Lara Gut	(Liechtenstein) Tina Weirather	(Germany) Viktoria Rebensburg	
1500	14	29 December 2015	(Austria) Lienz	SL_{430}	(Sweden) Frida Hansdotter	(Switzerland) Wendy Holdener	(Slovakia) Petra Vlhová	
		1 January 2016	(Germany) Munich	CE_{cnx}	pre-season organizational issues; replaced in Stockholm on 23 February 2016			
		3 January 2016	(Croatia) Zagreb	SL_{cnx}	warm temperatures and lack of snow; replaced in Santa Caterina on 5 January 2016			
1501	15	5 January 2016	(Italy) Santa Caterina	SL_{431}	(Norway) Nina Løseth	(Czech Republic) Šárka Strachová	(Slovakia) Veronika Velez-Zuzulová	
		9 January 2016	(Austria) St. Anton	DH_{cnx}	warm temperatures and lack of snow; replaced in Zauchensee on 9 January 2016			
		10 January 2016	(Austria) St. Anton	SG_{cnx}	warm temperatures and lack of snow; replaced in Zauchensee on 10 January 2016			
1502	16	9 January 2016	(Austria) Zauchensee	DH_{380}	(United States) Lindsey Vonn	(Canada) Larisa Yurkiw	(Austria) Cornelia Hütter	
1503	17	10 January 2016	(Austria) Zauchensee	SG_{205}	(United States) Lindsey Vonn	(Switzerland) Lara Gut	(Austria) Cornelia Hütter	
		16 January 2016	(Germany) Ofterschwang	GS_{cnx}	warm temperatures and lack of snow; replaced in Flachau on 17 January 2016			
		17 January 2016	(Germany) Ofterschwang	SL_{cnx}	warm temperatures and lack of snow; replaced in Flachau on 15 January 2016			
1504	18	12 January 2016	(Austria) Flachau	SL_{432}	(Slovakia) Veronika Velez-Zuzulová	(Czech Republic) Šárka Strachová	(Sweden) Frida Hansdotter	
1505	19	15 January 2016	(Austria) Flachau	SL_{433}	(Slovakia) Veronika Velez-Zuzulová	(Sweden) Frida Hansdotter	(Slovakia) Petra Vlhová	
1506	20	17 January 2016	(Austria) Flachau	GS_{384}	(Germany) Viktoria Rebensburg	(Slovenia) Ana Drev	(Italy) Federica Brignone	
1507	21	23 January 2016	(Italy) Cortina d'Ampezzo	DH_{381}	(United States) Lindsey Vonn	(Canada) Larisa Yurkiw	(Switzerland) Lara Gut	
1508	22	24 January 2016	(Italy) Cortina d'Ampezzo	SG_{206}	(United States) Lindsey Vonn	(Liechtenstein) Tina Weirather	(Germany) Viktoria Rebensburg	
1509	23	30 January 2016	(Slovenia) Maribor	GS_{385}	(Germany) Viktoria Rebensburg	(Slovenia) Ana Drev	(Liechtenstein) Tina Weirather	
		31 January 2016	(Slovenia) Maribor	SL_{cnx}	warm temperatures and poor track conditions; replaced in Crans-Montana in 15 February 2016			
1510	24	6 February 2016	(Germany) Garmsich-Partenkirchen	DH_{382}	(United States) Lindsey Vonn	(Switzerland) Fabienne Suter	(Germany) Viktoria Rebensburg	
1511	25	7 February 2016	(Germany) Garmsich-Partenkirchen	SG_{207}	(Switzerland) Lara Gut	(Germany) Viktoria Rebensburg	(United States) Lindsey Vonn	
		13 February 2016	(Switzerland) Crans-Montana	DH_{cnx}	excessive snow: replaced in La Thuile on 19 February 2016			
		14 February 2016	(Switzerland) Crans-Montana	AC_{cnx}	excessive snow forced delay in previous days event			
1512	26	15 February 2016	(Switzerland) Crans-Montana	SL_{434}	(United States) Mikaela Shiffrin	(France) Nastasia Noens	(Canada) Marie-Michèle Gagnon	
1513	27	19 February 2016	(Italy) La Thuile	DH_{383}	(Switzerland) Lara Gut	(Austria) Cornelia Hütter	(Italy) Nadia Fanchini	
1514	28	20 February 2016	(Italy) La Thuile	DH_{384}	(Italy) Nadia Fanchini	(United States) Lindsey Vonn	(Italy) Daniela Merighetti	
1515	29	21 February 2016	(Italy) La Thuile	SG_{208}	(Liechtenstein) Tina Weirather	(Switzerland) Lara Gut	(United States) Lindsey Vonn	
1516	30	23 February 2016	(Sweden) Stockholm	CE_{005}	(Switzerland) Wendy Holdener	(Sweden) Frida Hansdotter	(Sweden) Maria Pietilä-Holmner	
1517	31	27 February 2016	(Andorra) Soldeu	SG_{209}	(Italy) Federica Brignone	(United States) Laurenne Ross	(Austria) Tamara Tippler	
1518	32	28 February 2016	(Andorra) Soldeu	AC_{097}	(Canada) Marie-Michèle Gagnon	(Switzerland) Wendy Holdener	(France) Anne-Sophie Barthet	
		5 March 2016	(Slovakia) Jasná	GS_{cnx}	excessive high winds and delayed; replaced in Jasná on 7 March 2016			
1519	33	6 March 2016	(Slovakia) Jasná	SL_{435}	(United States) Mikaela Shiffrin	(Switzerland) Wendy Holdener	(Slovakia) Veronika Velez-Zuzulová	
1520	34	7 March 2016	(Slovakia) Jasná	GS_{386}	(Austria) Eva-Maria Brem	(Germany) Viktoria Rebensburg	(Italy) Federica Brignone	
1521	35	12 March 2016	(Switzerland) Lenzerheide	SG_{210}	(Austria) Cornelia Hütter	(Switzerland) Fabienne Suter	(Austria) Tamara Tippler	
1522	36	13 March 2016	(Switzerland) Lenzerheide	AC_{098}	(Switzerland) Wendy Holdener	(Austria) Michaela Kirchgasser	(Switzerland) Lara Gut	
1523	37	16 March 2016	(Switzerland) St. Moritz	DH_{385}	(Austria) Mirjam Puchner	(Switzerland) Fabienne Suter	(Italy) Elena Curtoni	
1524	38	17 March 2016	(Switzerland) St. Moritz	SG_{211}	(Liechtenstein) Tina Weirather	(Switzerland) Lara Gut	(Austria) Cornelia Hütter	
1525	39	19 March 2016	(Switzerland) St. Moritz	SL_{436}	(United States) Mikaela Shiffrin	(Slovakia) Veronika Velez-Zuzulová	(Sweden) Frida Hansdotter	
1526	40	20 March 2016	(Switzerland) St. Moritz	GS_{387}	(Germany) Viktoria Rebensburg	(France) Taina Barioz	(Switzerland) Lara Gut	

=== Rankings ===
Overall

Rank	after all 40 races	Points
1	(Switzerland) Lara Gut	1522
2	(United States) Lindsey Vonn	1235
3	(Germany) Viktoria Rebensburg	1147
4	(Liechtenstein) Tina Weirather	1016
5	(Sweden) Frida Hansdotter	915

Main article: 2016 Women's overall

Downhill

Rank	after all 9 races	Points
1	(United States) Lindsey Vonn	580
2	(Switzerland) Fabienne Suter	463
3	(Canada) Larisa Yurkiw	407
4	(Switzerland) Lara Gut	394
5	(Austria) Cornelia Hütter	387

Main article: 2016 Women's downhill

Super G

Rank	after all 8 races	Points
1	(Switzerland) Lara Gut	481
2	(Liechtenstein) Tina Weirather	436
3	(United States) Lindsey Vonn	420
4	(Austria) Cornelia Hütter	400
5	(Germany) Viktoria Rebensburg	293

Main article: 2016 Women's super-G

Giant slalom

Rank	after all 9 races	Points
1	(Austria) Eva-Maria Brem	592
2	(Germany) Viktoria Rebensburg	590
3	(Switzerland) Lara Gut	472
4	(Italy) Federica Brignone	425
5	(Liechtenstein) Tina Weirather	321

Main article: 2016 Women's giant slalom

Slalom

Rank	after all 11 races	Points
1	(Sweden) Frida Hansdotter	711
2	(Slovakia) Veronika Velez-Zuzulová	626
3	(Switzerland) Wendy Holdener	561
4	(United States) Mikaela Shiffrin	500
5	(Czech Republic) Šárka Strachová	493

Main article: 2016 Women's slalom

Alpine combined

Rank	after all 3 races	Points
1	(Switzerland) Wendy Holdener	198
2	(Switzerland) Lara Gut	160
3	(Austria) Michaela Kirchgasser	153
4	(Canada) Marie-Michèle Gagnon	145
5	(United States) Lindsey Vonn	100

Main article: 2016 Women's combined

== Nation team event ==
Event key: PG – Parallel giant slalom
#	Event	Date	Venue	Type	Winner	Second	Third	Details
11	1	18 March 2016	(Switzerland) St. Moritz	PG _{008}	Switzerland Charlotte Chable; Michelle Gisin; Wendy Holdener; Justin Murisier; Reto Schmidiger; Daniel Yule	Germany Lena Dürr; Christina Geiger; Katrin Hirtl-Stanggassinger; Fritz Dopfer; Stefan Luitz; Dominik Stehle	Sweden Frida Hansdotter; Maria Pietilä-Holmner; Anna Swenn-Larsson; Jens Byggmark; Mattias Hargin; André Myhrer	

== Nations Cup ==
Overall

Rank	after all 85 races	Points
1	Austria	10591
2	Italy	8770
3	France	7733
4	Switzerland	7195
5	Norway	5929

Men

Rank	after all 44 races	Points
1	Austria	5804
2	France	5603
3	Norway	4833
4	Italy	4512
5	Switzerland	2940

Women

Rank	after all 40 races	Points
1	Austria	4787
2	Italy	4258
3	Switzerland	4255
4	United States	3077
5	Sweden	2432

== Prize money ==
Prize Money Earned

Men	Statistic (CHF)	Women
5,377,082	Available (10.0364 Mil)	4,659,317
33,192	Average per Awardee	35,298
7,834	Median Awardee	7,817
122,206	Average per Event	116,483
168.98	Average Point Earns	161.11

Top-5 Men

Rank	after all 44 races	CHF
1	(Austria) Marcel Hirscher	588,779
2	(Norway) Aksel Lund Svindal	429,219
3	(Norway) Henrik Kristoffersen	415,449
4	(France) Alexis Pinturault	335,985
5	(Norway) Kjetil Jansrud	297,176

Top-5 Women

Rank	after all 40 races	CHF
1	(United States) Lindsey Vonn	432,106
2	(Switzerland) Lara Gut	383,274
3	(Germany) Viktoria Rebensburg	269,870
4	(United States) Mikaela Shiffrin	230,650
5	(Slovakia) Veronika Velez-Zuzulová	226,096
