= Josée Lacasse =

Canadian alpine skier (born 1965)

Personal information
- Born: 25 October 1965 (age 60)

Skiing career
- Sport: Alpine skiing

Olympics
- Teams: 1998

Josée Lacasse (born 25 October 1965) is a Canadian former alpine skier who competed in the 1988 Winter Olympics. Winning multiple World Cup titles she was a force to be reckoned with. Now currently residing in the United States, she has daughters Zoë and Danika. She continues to share her skills and knowledge for the sport, by coaching kids on the Diamond Peak Ski Team in Lake Tahoe.

== Life ==
Lacasse moved to the United States to attend Sierra Nevada College on a full scholarship (currently in their hall of fame). She is now both a ski racing coach at Diamond Peak (ski area) and is working to become a nurse.
