= Jim Read (alpine skier) =

Canadian alpine skier (born 1962)

Jim Read (born 18 November 1962) is a Canadian former alpine skier who competed in the 1984 Winter Olympics and 1988 Winter Olympics.
