= Kevin Wert =

Canadian alpine skier (born 1975)

Kevin Wert (born 10 March 1975) is a Canadian former alpine skier who competed in the 1998 Winter Olympics.
