= Anne Blackburn =

American academic

Anne M. Blackburn is a historian of South and Southeast Asian Buddhism. She is Old Dominion Foundation Professor in the Humanities at Cornell University. Blackburn received her B.A. in Asian History and Religion in 1988 from Swarthmore College, her M.A. in Religious Studies in 1990 from University of Chicago Divinity School, and her Ph.D. in History of Religions in 1996 from the same institution. Blackburn's teachers include Steven Collins, Charles Hallisey, Frank E. Reynolds, and Donald Swearer.

== Research ==
Blackburn is currently working on a new project, "Monks, Texts, and Relics: A History of Buddhism in South and Southeast Asia". This study aims to examine the Buddhist monastic networks and temple formation in British colonial port cities.

== Selected publications ==
Books

- Locations of Buddhism: Colonialism and Modernity in Sri Lanka. Chicago: University of Chicago Press, 2010.
- Approaching the Dhamma: Buddhist Texts and Practices in South and Southeast Asia. ed. Anne M. Blackburn and Jeffrey Samuels. Seattle: BPS Pariyatti Editions, 2003.
- Buddhist Learning and Textual Practice in Eighteenth-Century Lankan Monastic Culture. Princeton: Princeton University Press, 2001.

Articles

- "'Buddhist Revival' and the 'Work of Culture' in 19th-Century Lanka." In The Anthropologist and the Native: Essays for Gananath Obeyesekere, ed. H.L. Seneviratne. Societa Editrice Fiorentina-Manohar, 2009.
- "Writing Histories from Landscape and Architecture: Sukhothai and Chiang Mai." Buddhist Studies Review 24, 2 (2007): 192–225.
- "Localizing Lineage: Importing Higher Ordination in Theravadin South and Southeast Asia." In Constituting Communities: Theravada Buddhism and the Religious Cultures of South and Southeast Asia, ed. John Holt, Jonathan Walters and Jacob Kinnard. SUNY Press, 2003.
- "Notes on Sri Lankan Temple Manuscript Collections." Journal of the Pali Text Society. 27 (2002): 1-59.
- "Serendipity and Sadness." In Excursions and Explorations: Cultural Encounters Between the United States and Sri Lanka, ed. Tissa Jayatilleke. (Print Pack Limited, Colombo 2002).
- "Looking for the Vinaya: Monastic Discipline in the Practical Canons of the Theravada." Journal of the International Association of Buddhist Studies. 22, 2 (1999): 281–309.
- "Magic in the Monastery: Textual Practice and Monastic Identity in Sri Lanka." History of Religions. 38 (1999): 4:354-372.
