= Émilie Desforges =

Canadian alpine skier (born 1983)

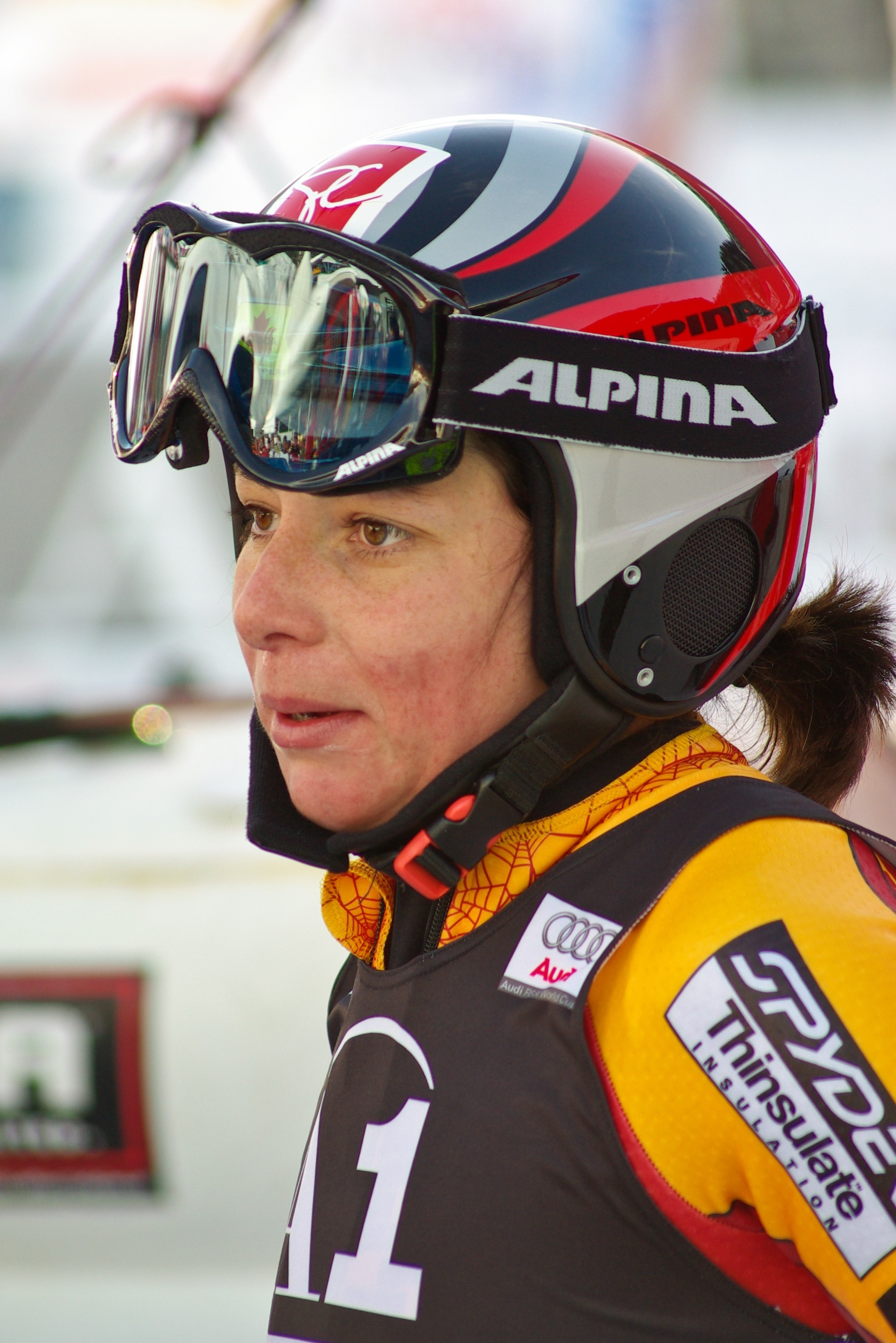
- Desforges in 2009

Personal information
- Born: February 27, 1983 (age 42) Montreal, Quebec, Canada

Emilie-Virginie Desforges (born February 27, 1983) is a Canadian skiing athlete who competed in various international events from 1998 to 2009, including women's super combined, giant slalom, super G and downhill races. She skis with the Mont Tremblant ski club.

A 2003 Radio Canada interview describes her as "A tiny energy ball shaking up the Canadian Alpine Ski Team. Impatient, hyperactive, Émilie Desforges made her world debut in front of her parents on Saturday in the second run of Lake Louise." At this event (the 2003 FIS World Cup in Lake Louise), she finished 54th in the downhill event.

Since retiring from skiing, she returned to school at the Universite de Montreal from 2010-2014, earning a diploma in nursing sciences. After graduation, she participates in clinical research studies.
