= Phil Brown (skier) =

Canadian alpine skier (born 1991)

Personal information
- Born: September 11, 1991 (age 34) Toronto, Ontario
- Height: 1.82 m (6 ft 0 in)

Skiing career
- Sport: Alpine skiing
- Club: Craigleith SC
- Disciplines: Slalom, giant slalom.
- World Cup debut: 7 January 2012 (age 20)

Olympics
- Teams: 2 – (2014, 2018)
- Medals: 0

World Championships
- Teams: 3 – (2013–2017)
- Medals: 1 (0 gold)

World Cup
- Podiums: 0
- Overall titles: 0
- Discipline titles: 0
Medal record
Men's alpine skiing
Representing Canada
World Championships
| Silver medal – second place | 2015 Beaver Creek | Team event |

Philip Brown (born September 11, 1991) is a Canadian World Cup alpine ski racer specializing in slalom. Born and raised in Toronto, Ontario, he represented Canada at two Winter Olympics and three World Championships. Phil joined the dual format World Pro Ski Tour in 2018, winning the tour overall title in 2019. For the 2019/20 season Phil is currently racing full time on the World Pro Ski Tour sponsored by Surefoot.

== World Cup results ==
- Brown's best World Cup result is 21st in giant slalom at Sölden in October 2014;
  his best slalom result is 22nd at Wengen in January 2018.

=== Season standings ===
| Season | Age | Overall | Slalom | Giant slalom | Super-G | Downhill | Combined |
|---|---|---|---|---|---|---|---|
| 2014 | 22 | 137 | — | 48 | — | — | — |
| 2015 | 23 | 124 | — | 38 | — | — | — |
| 2016 | 24 | 149 | — | 53 | — | — | — |
| 2017 | 25 | 141 | 52 | — | — | — | — |
| 2018 | 26 | 145 | 51 | — | — | — | — |
| 2019 | 27 | no World Cup points | | | | | |

Standings through 20 January 2019

== World Championship results ==
| Year | Age | Slalom | Giant slalom | Super-G | Downhill | Combined | Team event |
|---|---|---|---|---|---|---|---|
| 2013 | 21 | BDNF1 | 35 | — | — | — | 4 |
| 2015 | 23 | DNF1 | 22 | — | — | — | 2 |
| 2017 | 25 | DNF1 | DNF2 | — | — | — | 5 |

== Olympic results ==
| Year | Age | Slalom | Giant slalom | Super-G | Downhill | Combined | Team event |
|---|---|---|---|---|---|---|---|
| 2014 | 22 | 20 | 29 | — | — | — | —N/a |
| 2018 | 26 | 22 | 27 | — | — | — | 9 |
