= Gerry Rinaldi =

Canadian alpine skier (1945–2017)

Gerry Rinaldi (25 June 1945 – 9 January 2017) was a Canadian alpine skier who competed in the 1968 Winter Olympics.

Rinaldi died in Kelowna, British Columbia on 9 January 2017, at the age of 72.
