= Larisa Yurkiw =

Canadian alpine skier (born 1988)

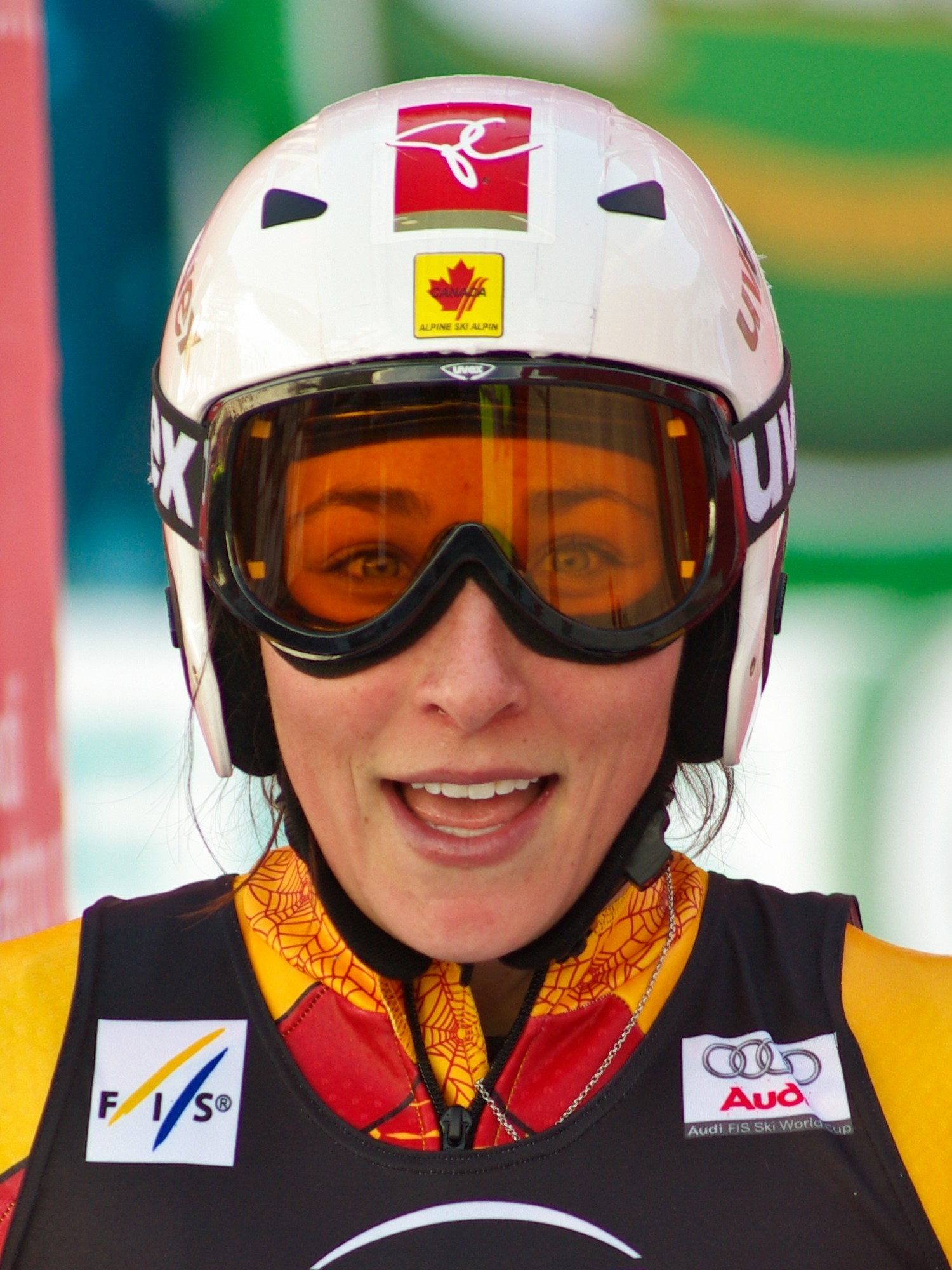
- January 2009

Personal information
- Born: March 30, 1988 (age 38) Owen Sound, Ontario, Canada
- Height: 1.71 m (5 ft 7 in)
- Website: larisayurkiw.com

Skiing career
- Sport: Alpine skiing
- Club: Georgian Peaks Ski Club, Thornbury, Ontario
- Retired: 11 May 2016 (age 28)
- Disciplines: Downhill, Super-G
- World Cup debut: January 13, 2007 (age 18)

Olympics
- Teams: 1 – (2014)
- Medals: 0

World Championships
- Teams: 3 – (2009, 2013, 2015)
- Medals: 0

World Cup
- Seasons: 6 – (2009–10, 2013–16)
- Wins: 0
- Podiums: 4 – (4 DH)
- Overall titles: 0 – (22nd in 2016)
- Discipline titles: 0 – (3rd in DH, 2016)

Larisa Yurkiw (born March 30, 1988) is a Canadian retired World Cup alpine ski racer, specializing in the speed events of downhill and super-G.

Born in Owen Sound, Ontario, Yurkiw made her World Cup debut at Altenmarkt-Zauchensee, Austria, in a downhill event in January 2007. In 2015, she achieved a personal best at Cortina d'Ampezzo, Italy when she placed 2nd in the DH discipline. She went on to achieve three more World Cup podiums.

On December 16, 2009, a crash during a training run at Val d'Isere resulted in an ACL tear, MCL tear, patellar tendon tear and tears in both the lateral and medial miniscus in her left knee. She did not compete on home soil at the 2010 Winter Olympics in Vancouver and Whistler, British Columbia.

Prior to debuting on the world stage, she had much success as a junior ski racer. She made her debut on the Nor-Am Cup on March 10, 2004, held at her home club, Georgian Peaks. From 2005 to 2009, she reached the podium seventeen times, having won gold eight times in all disciplines but slalom. She also had success racing on the GMC Cup (also known as Pontiac Cup), a non-FIS sanctioned ski series that challenges Canada's most promising skiers. In 2007, Larisa competed on the South American Cup, having posted four top 10 results.

Yurkiw picked up a silver medal at the 2008 FIS Junior World Ski Championships in Formigal, Spain in the combined discipline. From 2006 to 2008, she posted three more top 10 results at this event.

She earned two gold medals at the 2008 Canadian National Championships in Super-G and downhill, and three silver medals in 2009. Since she was still considered a junior in both 2008 and 2009, she went on to become the Canadian National Junior Champion in downhill, giant slalom, and slalom.

At age 28, Yurkiw announced her retirement on May 11, 2016, via social media, citing her desire to preserve her health. This had come after the best season of her career.

== World Cup results ==
=== Season standings ===
Season	Age	Overall	Slalom	Giant slalom	Super-G	Downhill	Combined
2009	20	88	—	—	—	33	44
2010	21	95	—	—	49	43	—
2011	22	injured, out for season					
2012	23	—	—	—	—	—	—
2013	24	111	—	—	42	—	—
2014	25	52	—	—	40	24	—
2015	26	32	—	—	41	10	—
2016	27	22	—	—	25	3	—

=== Race podiums ===
- 0 wins
- 4 podiums – (4 DH), 12 top tens (12 DH)

Season	Date	Location	Discipline	Place
2015	16 Jan 2015	Cortina d'Ampezzo, Italy	Downhill	2nd
2016	19 Dec 2015	Val-d'Isère, France	Downhill	3rd
2016	9 Jan 2016	Altenmarkt, Austria	Downhill	2nd
2016	23 Jan 2016	Cortina d'Ampezzo, Italy	Downhill	2nd

== World Championship results ==
Year	Age	Slalom	Giant slalom	Super-G	Downhill	Combined
2009	20	—	—	DNF	—	—
2011	22	—	—	—	—	—
2013	24	—	—	23	28	DNF2
2015	26	—	—	28	14	—

== Olympic results ==
Year	Age	Slalom	Giant slalom	Super-G	Downhill	Combined
2014	25	—	—	DNF	20	—

== Equipment and sponsorship ==
- Skis: Rossignol
- Bindings: Rossignol
- Boots: Rossignol
- Poles: Komperdell
- Helmet & Goggles: Uvex
- Sponsor: Cresco FX
