= Keith Shepherd (alpine skier) =

Canadian alpine skier (born 1947)

Keith Shepherd (born 21 October 1947) is a Canadian former alpine skier who competed in the 1968 Winter Olympics.
