= Shona Rubens =

Canadian alpine skier (born 1986)

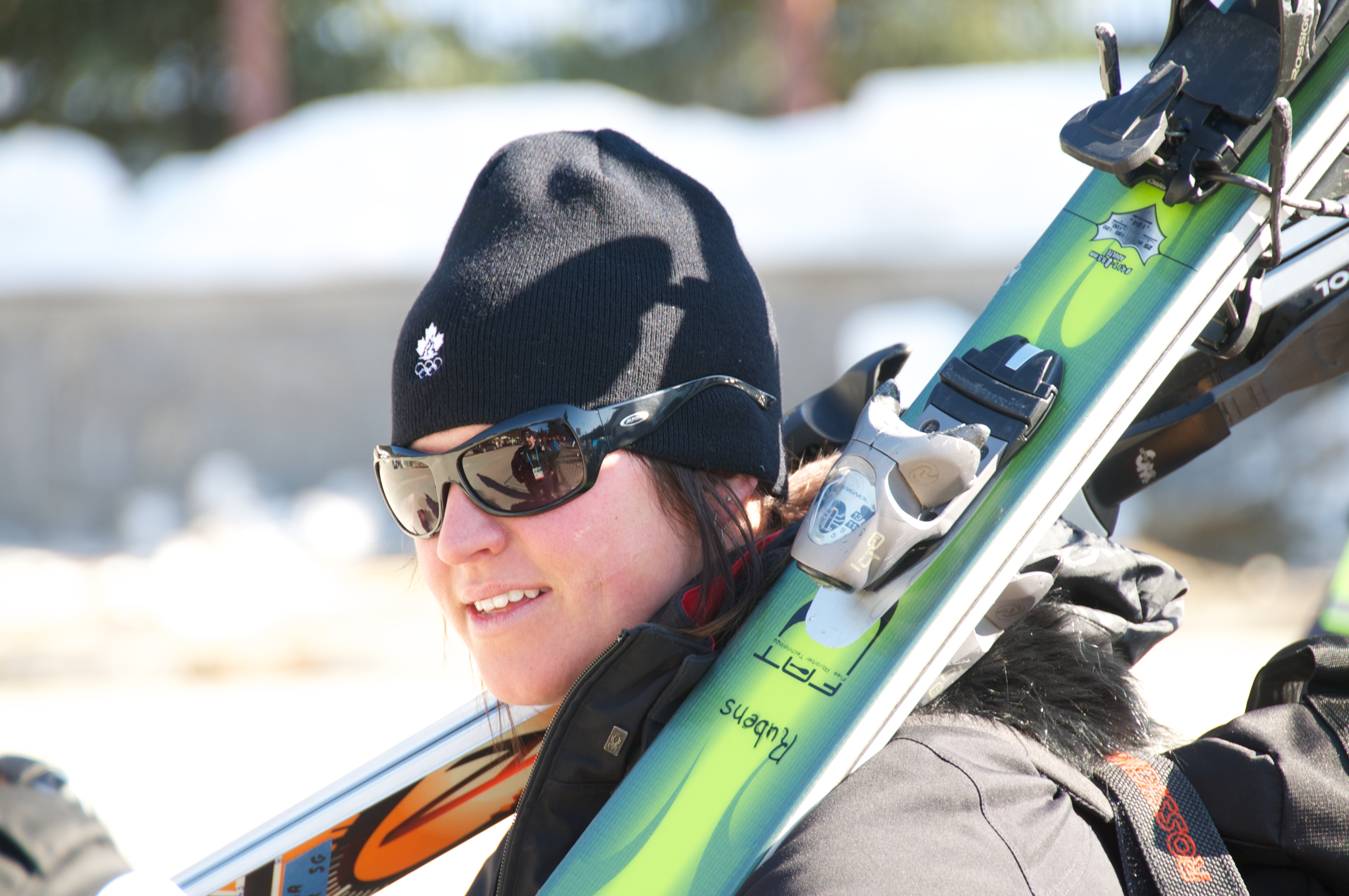
Shona Rubens at the 2010 Winter Olympics.

Shona Rubens (born 31 October 1986 in Sydney, Australia) is a Canadian alpine skier.

Rubens qualified to compete for Canada at the 2006 Winter Olympics after placing 18th in a World Cup downhill in St. Moritz, Switzerland. Her other career highlights including placing second in downhill at the 2004 Lake Louise Nor-Am Cup and placing fifth in the super-G at 2005 Canadian championships.

== Personal life ==
Rubens has lived in Canmore, Alberta for two years and grew up in Calgary, Alberta. Rubens went to high school at the Calgary-based National Sport School.
