= Britt Janyk =

Canadian alpine skier (born 1980)

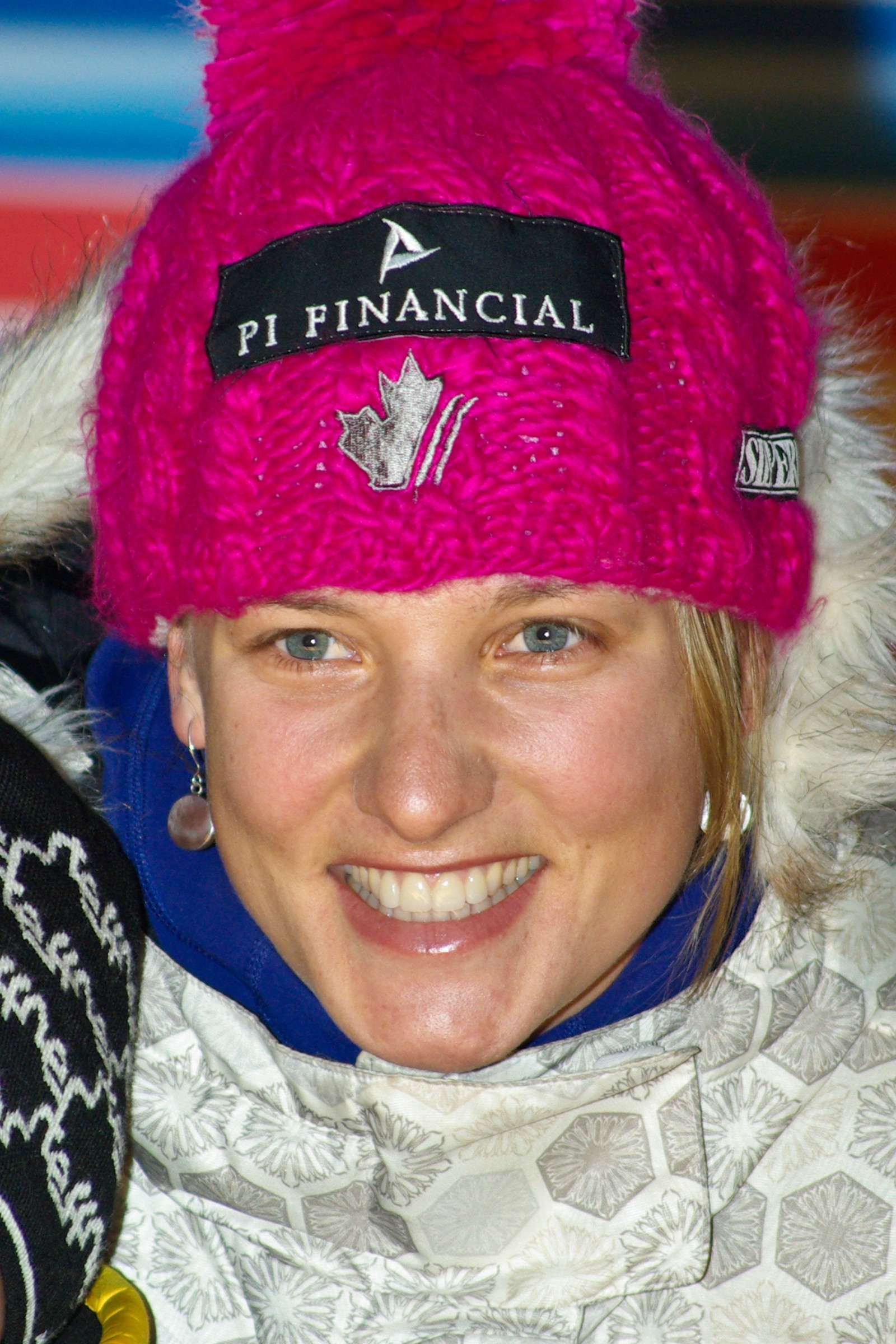

Personal information
- Born: May 21, 1980 (age 46) North Vancouver, British Columbia, Canada
- Height: 168 cm (5 ft 6 in)
- Website: BrittJanyk.com (archived)

Skiing career
- Sport: Alpine skiing
- Club: Whistler Mountain Ski Club
- Disciplines: DH, SG, combined, GS
- World Cup debut: October 31, 1999

Olympics
- Teams: 0
- Medals: 0 (0 gold)

World Championships
- Teams: 4
- Medals: 0 (0 gold)

World Cup
- Seasons: 9
- Wins: 1
- Podiums: 2
- Overall titles: 0
- Discipline titles: 0

Britt Janyk (born May 21, 1980, in North Vancouver, British Columbia) is a Canadian retired alpine skier, specializing in downhill, super-G, alpine combined, and giant slalom, having also competed in slaloms in the past. During her career Janyk scored 18 top 10 finishes in alpine skiing World Cup competition, including two podium finishes, both in downhill races: a win in Aspen and a third in Lake Louise, both in 2007. She announced her retirement from the sport in May 2011.

Her brother Michael Janyk is also an alpine skier who successfully competes in the World Cup.

She contributed regularly to the Eurosport coverage of the 2012-2013 Alpine Skiing World Cup. She was also part of the commentary team for the alpine skiing events for the IOC's international TV feed at the 2018 Winter Olympics in Pyongchang.

== World Cup victories ==
Date	Location	Race
8 December 2007	(United States) Aspen	Downhill
