= Alain Villiard =

Canadian alpine skier (born 1965)

Alain Villiard (born 25 May 1965) is a Canadian former alpine skier who competed in the 1988 Winter Olympics.
