= Allison Forsyth =

Canadian alpine skier (born 1978)

Personal information
- Born: 14 October 1978 (age 47)

Skiing career
- Sport: Alpine skiing

Olympics
- Teams: 2002

Allison Forsyth (born 14 October 1978) is a Canadian former alpine skier from Nanaimo, British Columbia, who competed in the 2002 Winter Olympics.

She retired from competitive skiing after the 2007–08 season, due to injuries suffered over her career, and to start a family.

Forsyth was sexually abused by Alpine Canada coach Bertrand Charest. In 2017, Charest was sentenced to 12 years in prison for sex crimes against young skiers. He appealed, and his sentence was reduced to 57 months. He has since been granted parole. Forsyth settled her lawsuit against Alpine Canada in October 2023. Though the terms of the settlement were not disclosed, the CEO of Alpine Canada has since noted that "in the clearest of terms, we are deeply saddened by her experience, repulsed by her abuser's actions, and apologize for the harm she experienced."

In October 2021 she joined ITP Sport & Recreation Inc. as the COO and Partner with a vision to end maltreatment in sport.

In 2022 Canada Soccer hired Forsyth's organization ITP Sport & Recreation Inc. "to get us to where we want to be" with SafeSport.

In November 2023 Forsyth left ITP Sport & Recreation Inc. to found her own organization, Generation Safe with the commitment to educate and simplify the complexities of Safe Sport for all.
