= Michael Janyk =

Canadian alpine skier (born 1982)

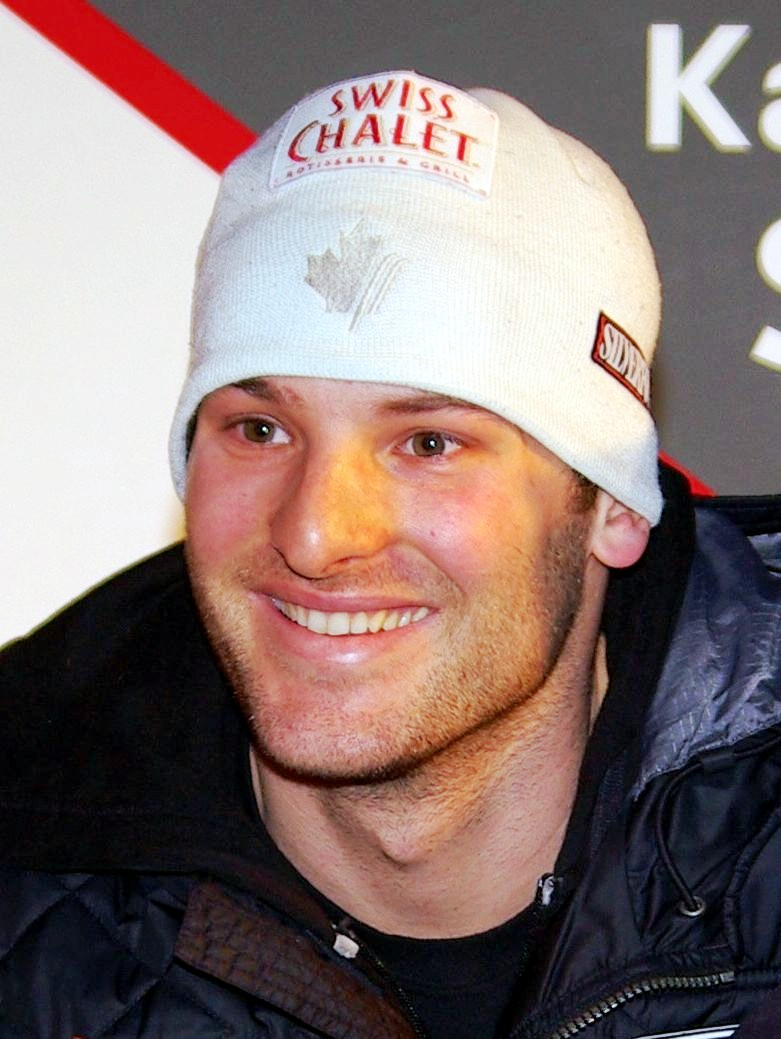

Medal record

Men's alpine skiing

Representing Canada

World Championships
Bronze medal – third place	2009 Val d'Isère	Slalom

Michael Janyk (born March 22, 1982, in Vancouver) is a Canadian retired alpine skier. Janyk appeared for the Canadian team in the slalom event at the 2006 Winter Olympics, where he finished in 17th place. Janyk has yet to win a World Cup race in his professional career, but has finished second on one occasion, December 3, 2006, in a slalom race in Beaver Creek.

He also won the bronze medal in Slalom in February at the 2009 Alpine Skiing World Championship in Val d'Isère. He announced his retirement from the sport in March 2014.

Along with team-mate Manuel Osborne-Paradis he established the Mike and Manny Foundation, which organises ski camps for children.

In 2023, Janyk released a memoir titled: Go to the Start: Life as a World Cup Ski Racer.

His sister Britt Janyk also competes in the alpine skiing World Cup.
