= Jeffrey Frisch =

Canadian alpine skier

Personal information
- Born: 1 June 1984 (age 42) Brixen, Italy
- Height: 184 cm (72 in)
- Weight: 86 kg (190 lb)

Sport
- Sport: Skiing
- Updated on 15 February 2010

Jeffrey Frisch (born 1 June 1984 at Brixen, Italy) is a Canadian alpine skier.

He was expected to join the Canadian alpine skiing team at the 2010 Winter Olympics in Vancouver. However, in February 2010 prior to competition he injured his anterior cruciate ligament during training in Nakiska forcing his withdrawal from the games. Frisch lives in Mont Tremblant.

Frisch was born in Italy to an Italian father and a Canadian mother. He speaks German, Italian, English and French.
