= Sarah Bennett =

British governess

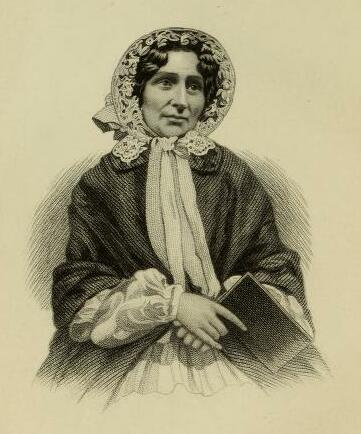
- Born: 4 March 1797; Spalding, England
- Died: 12 March 1861 (aged 64); Nuneaton, England
- Education: Camden House, Kensington
- Occupations: school founder and governess

Sarah Bennett (4 March 1797 – 12 March 1861) was a British governess. She also taught at schools and started her own in Melton Mowbray. Her nephew published a memoir in 1862.

== Life ==
Bennett was born in Spalding in 1797. In 1804 her father, Henry Bennett, died leaving a failed building business. Her mother Elizabeth (born Bright) had eight children to look after and the eldest was Sarah who was seven. Her godfather who was a Spalding-based solicitor paid for her to go to a boarding school in Kensington called Camden House.

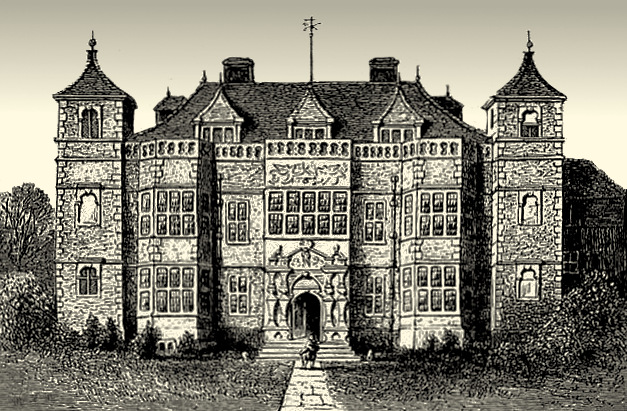
Campden house in Kensington in 1878. Camden?

Her godfather's sister was involved with Camden House. After she left, she was able to find work as a governess to several families. In 1817, she stopped working as a governess for eight years as she was employed by her former Camden House teachers at a school they were running in Spalding. After that, she returned to being a governess until, in 1837, she decided to open her own school in the town of Melton Mowbray with a friend named Susan Baldwin. The school did not allow the students to dance, and it stressed the importance of religious instruction. Bennett was an Anglican and she encouraged charitable acts. She gave money to a non-denominational school in Ireland. She believed that dancing and frivolity were not good for girls - particularly those from the lower classes. She tried, however, to make the lessons at the school more interesting. She would include an anecdote in her lessons.

The school closed in 1852 when her hearing and sight loss forced her to retire. She had an itinerant retirement. Her income was small, but she was well regarded and she would stay with former pupils. Bennett died at a former pupil's house in Nuneaton in 1861. In the following year, her memoir titled The Christian Governess was published by her nephew George Bright Bennett, who was a curate.
