= Mount Édouard =

Mountain in Quebec, Canada

Highest point
- Peak: 640
- Coordinates: 48°09′06″N 70°17′04″W

Geography
- Location: L'Anse-Saint-Jean
- Country: Canada
- Province: Quebec
- Administrative region: Saguenay–Lac-Saint-Jean
- MRC: Le Fjord-du-Saguenay Regional County Municipality
- Settlement: Laurentian Mountains
- Topo map: NTS 22D1 L'Anse-Saint-Jean

The Mont Édouard, named in honor of Édouard Moreau, is a mountain not far from the village of L'Anse-Saint-Jean, near Saguenay National Park, in Le Fjord-du-Saguenay Regional County Municipality, in administrative region of Saguenay–Lac-Saint-Jean, in Quebec, Canada. It is home to one of the most important ski centers in Saguenay–Lac-Saint-Jean.

== Recreational activities ==
This mountain has several hiking trails accessible to hikers of all ages who love nature. An observation tower has been set up at the top of the mountain. It includes belvederes allowing panoramic views of three former glacial valleys, namely the Périgny valley, the Fjord valley and the Lake Édouard valley (the Zec de l'Anse-Saint-Jean). Nature lovers reach this observation tower via the family trail (lasts about an hour) in summer or fall.

Mont Édouard is the fifth highest peak in Quebec. The ski center offers a vertical drop of 450 meters (1,480 ft) with 30 different slopes. Natural snowmaking is abundant, however, the center is equipped with artificial snowmaking equipment. This ski center is aimed at skiers of all categories. For example, the northeast slope, offering 310 meters (1,020 ft) of vertical drop, has a magnificent undergrowth intended for skiers.

This ski center offers a school slope and a treadmill to train young people in sliding sports. The center is equipped for tube descent, cross-country skiing in two family-type loops, snowshoe trails, as well as an ice rink at the foot of the slopes.

== Toponymy ==
This mountain was named in honour of Édouard Moreau, a trapper of Innu origin, who worked towards the end of the 19th century in the vicinity of this mountain. The entrepreneurs of the ski resort center project on Mont Édouard kept the same name for the ski resort center. The toponym "Mont Édouard" was made official on April 20, 1988, at the Place Names Bank of the Commission de toponymie du Québec.

== See also ==
- List of mountains of Quebec
