= Michael Tommy (alpine skier) =

Canadian alpine skier (born 1963)

Michael Tommy (born 4 October 1963) is a Canadian former alpine skier who competed in the 1984 Winter Olympics and 1988 Winter Olympics.
