= Zauberberg (ski area) =

Ski area at Semmering Pass, Austria

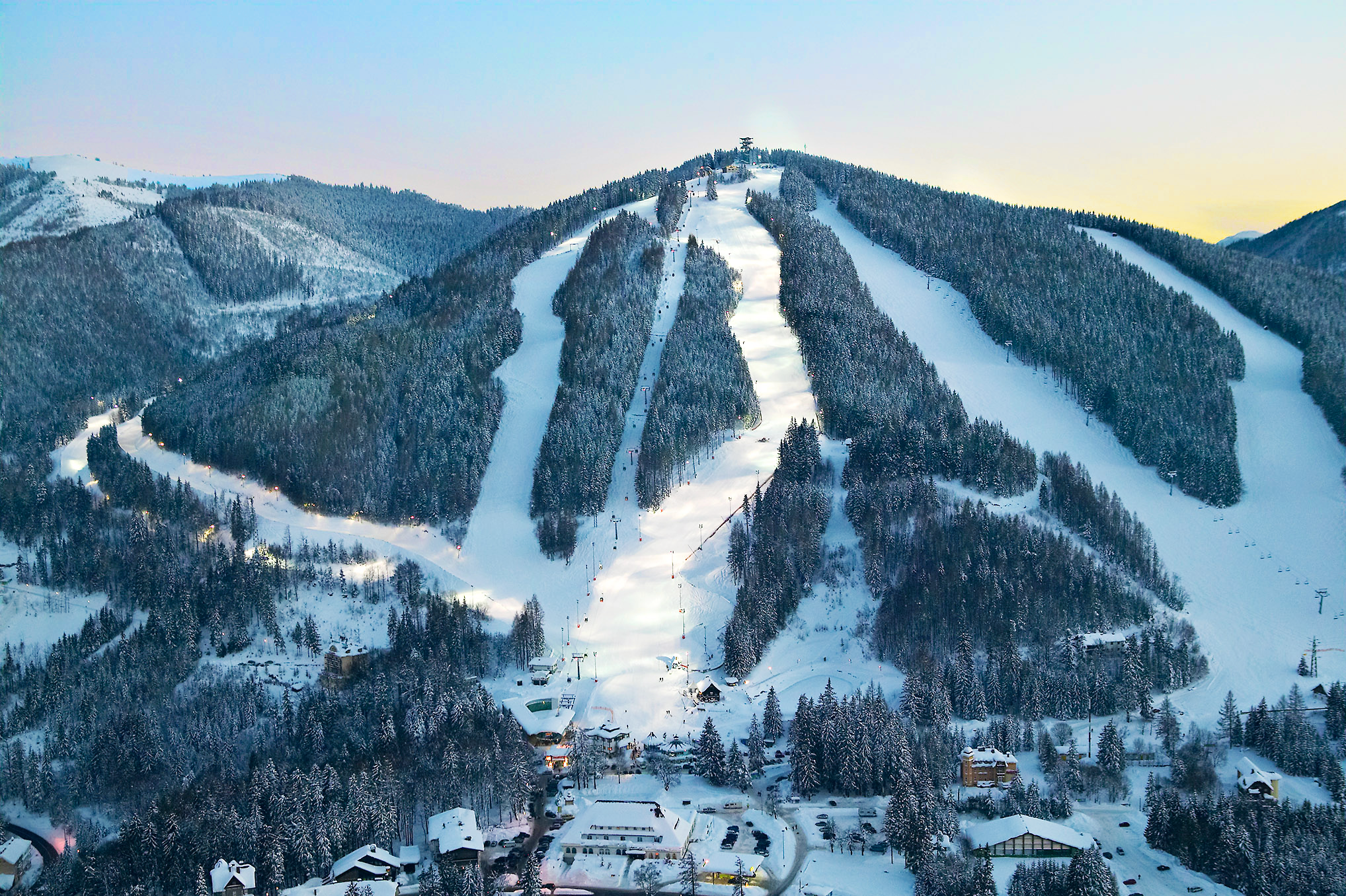

- Location in Austria Zauberberg (Alps)
- Location: Semmering, Austria
- Nearest city: Vienna: 100 km (60 mi); Graz: 100 km (60 mi)
- Coordinates: 47.631°N 15.830°E
- Vertical: 348 m (1,142 ft)
- Top elevation: 1,344 m (4,409 ft)
- Base elevation: 996 m (3,268 ft)
- Skiable area: Piste: 14 km (8.7 mi), Night: 13 km (8.1 mi)
- Lift system: 3 total (1 gondola lift, 1 quad chairlift, 1 tow lift)
- Terrain parks: 1, Atomic Superpark
- Website: semmering.com

Zauberberg is a ski area in eastern Austria, at Semmering Pass on the border of the states of Styria and Lower Austria. It is approximately midway between Vienna and Graz, about one hundred kilometres (60 miles) from each.

== Attractions ==
Zauberberg includes facilities for sledding, snowboarding, and skiing.
