= Marie-Pier Préfontaine =

Canadian alpine skier (born 1988)

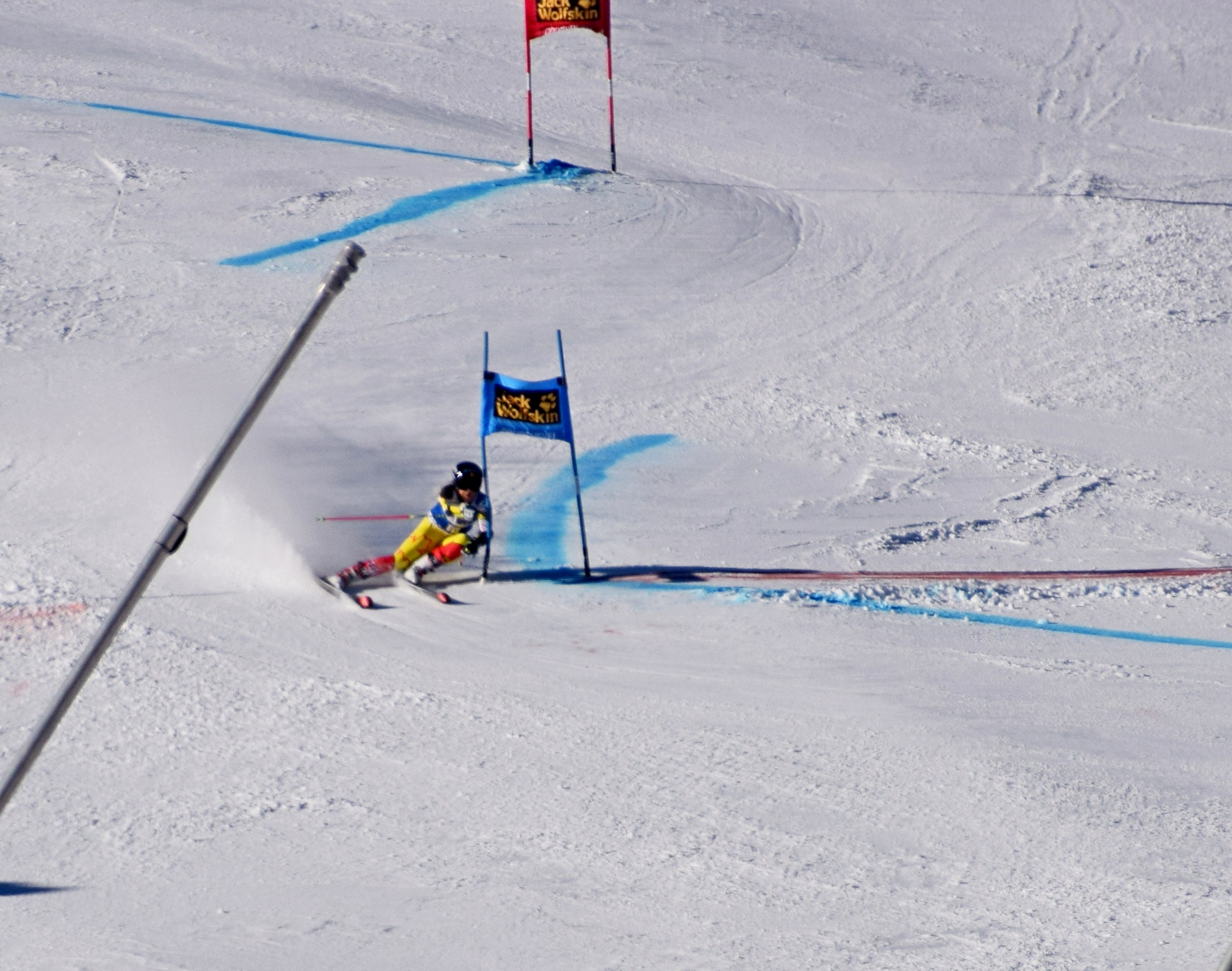
- Préfontaine in Courchevel, 2015

Personal information
- Born: 18 October 1988 (age 37) Sainte-Agathe-des-Monts, Quebec, Canada
- Height: 162 cm (5 ft 4 in)
- Weight: 66 kg (146 lb)

Sport
- Sport: Skiing
- Club: Mont-St-Sauveur, QC
Medal record
World Championships
Silver medal – second place	2015 Beaver Creek	Team event

Marie-Pier Préfontaine (born 18 October 1988) is a Canadian alpine skier.

She competed at the 2010 Winter Olympics in Vancouver in the women's giant slalom competition.
