= 2021–22 in skiing =

== Alpine skiing ==
=== World Junior Alpine Skiing Championships 2022 ===
- March 2 – 9: in Panorama
  - Downhill winners: (Italy) Giovanni Franzoni (m) / (Austria) Magdalena Egger
  - Super G winners: (United States) Isaiah Nelson (m) / (Austria) Magdalena Egger
  - Team parallel winners: Canada
  - Gigant slalom winners: (Norway) Alexander Steen Olsen (m) / / (Austria) Magdalena Egger
  - Slalom winners: (Norway) Alexander Steen Olsen (m) / (Croatia) Zrinka Ljutić (f)
  - Alpine Combined winners: (Italy) Giovanni Franzoni (m) / (France) Marie Lamure

=== 2021–22 FIS Alpine Ski World Cup ===
- October 23 & 24, 2021: WC #1 in (Austria) Sölden
  - Giant slalom winners: (Switzerland) Marco Odermatt (m) / (United States) Mikaela Shiffrin (f)
- November 13 & 14, 2021: WC #2 in (Austria) Lech/Zürs
  - Parallel Skiing winners: (Austria) Christian Hirschbühl (m) / (Slovenia) Andreja Slokar (f)
- November 20 & 21, 2021: WC #3 in (Finland) Levi (Women's only)
  - Slalom winner: (Slovakia) Petra Vlhová (2 times)
- November 23–28, 2021: WC #4 in (Canada) Lake Louise (Men's only)
  - Here Downhill #1 and Super G competitions are cancelled.
  - Downhill #2 winner: (Austria) Matthias Mayer
- November 27 & 28, 2021: WC #5 in (United States) Killington (Women's only)
  - Here Giant slalom competition are cancelled.
  - Slalom winner: (United States) Mikaela Shiffrin
- November 30 – December 5, 2021: WC #6 in (United States) Beaver Creek (Men's only)
  - Here Downhill #2 competition are cancelled.
  - Super G winners: (Switzerland) Marco Odermatt (1st) / (Norway) Aleksander Aamodt Kilde (2nd)
  - Downhill #1 winner: (Norway) Aleksander Aamodt Kilde
- November 30 – December 5, 2021: WC #7 in (Canada) Lake Louise (Women's only)
  - Downhill winner: (Italy) Sofia Goggia (2 times)
  - Super G winner: (Italy) Sofia Goggia
- December 11 & 12, 2021: WC #7 in (France) Val-d'Isère (Men's only)
  - Giant slalom winner: (Switzerland) Marco Odermatt
  - Slalom winner: (France) Clément Noël
- December 11 & 12, 2021: WC #8 in (Switzerland) St. Moritz (Women's only)
  - Super G winners: (Switzerland) Lara Gut-Behrami (1st) / (Italy) Federica Brignone (2nd)
- December 17 & 18, 2021: WC #9 in (Italy) Val Gardena/Gröden (Men's only)
  - Super G winner: (Norway) Aleksander Aamodt Kilde
  - Downhill winner: (United States) Bryce Bennett
- December 18 & 19, 2021: WC #10 in (France) Val-d'Isère (Women's only)
  - Downhill winner: (Italy) Sofia Goggia
  - Super G winner: (Italy) Sofia Goggia
- December 19 & 20, 2021: WC #11 in (Italy) Alta Badia (Men's only)
  - Giant slalom winners: (Norway) Henrik Kristoffersen (1st) / (Switzerland) Marco Odermatt (2nd)
- December 21 & 22, 2021: WC #12 in (France) Courchevel (Women's only)
  - Giant slalom winners: (United States) Mikaela Shiffrin (1st) / (Sweden) Sara Hector (2nd)
- December 22, 2021: WC #13 in (Italy) Madonna di Campiglio (Men's only)
  - Slalom winner: (Norway) Sebastian Foss-Solevåg
- December 26 – 29, 2021: WC #14 in (Italy) Bormio (Men's only)
  - Here, the second Super G event is cancelled.
  - Downhill winner: (Italy) Dominik Paris
  - Super G winner: (Norway) Aleksander Aamodt Kilde
- December 28 & 29, 2021: WC #15 in (Austria) Lienz (Women's only)
  - Giant slalom winner: (France) Tessa Worley
  - Slalom winner: (Slovakia) Petra Vlhová
- January 4 – 6: WC #16 in (Croatia) Zagreb
  - The Men's slalom competition was cancelled on January 5 due to bad weather and was rescheduled to January 6, but cancelled in first run after 19 skiers due to bad weather conditions.
  - Women's slalom winner: (Slovakia) Petra Vlhová
- January 8 & 9: WC #17 in (Slovenia) Kranjska Gora (Women's only)
  - Giant slalom winner: (Sweden) Sara Hector
  - Slalom winner: (Slovakia) Petra Vlhová
- January 8 & 9: WC #18 in (Switzerland) Adelboden (Men's only)
  - Giant slalom winner: (Switzerland) Marco Odermatt
  - Slalom winner: (Austria) Johannes Strolz
- January 11: WC #19 in (Austria) Schladming (Women's only)
  - Slalom winner: (United States) Mikaela Shiffrin
- January 13 – 16: WC #20 in (Switzerland) Wengen (Men's only)
  - Super G winner: (Switzerland) Marco Odermatt
  - Downhill winners: (Norway) Aleksander Aamodt Kilde (1st) / (Austria) Vincent Kriechmayr (2nd)
  - Slalom winner: (Norway) Lucas Braathen
- January 13 – 16: WC #21 in (Austria) Zauchensee (Women's only)
  - Downhill winner: (Switzerland) Lara Gut-Behrami
  - Super G winner: (Italy) Federica Brignone
- January 18 – 23: WC #22 in (Austria) Kitzbühel (Men's only)
  - Downhill winners: (Norway) Aleksander Aamodt Kilde (1st) / (Switzerland) Beat Feuz (2nd)
  - Slalom winner: (United Kingdom) Dave Ryding
- January 20 – 23: WC #23 in (Italy) Cortina d'Ampezzo (Women's only)
  - Downhill winner: (Italy) Sofia Goggia
  - Super G winner: (Italy) Elena Curtoni
- January 25: WC #24 in (Italy) Kronplatz (Plan de Corones) (Women's only)
  - Giant slalom winner: (Sweden) Sara Hector
- January 25: WC #25 in (Austria) Schladming (Men's only)
  - Slalom winner: (Germany) Linus Straßer
- January 27 – 30: WC #26 in (Germany) Garmisch-Partenkirchen (Women's only)
  - Downhill winner: (Switzerland) Corinne Suter
  - Super G winners: (Italy) Federica Brignone & (Austria) Cornelia Hütter (same time)
- February 24 – 27: WC #27 in (Switzerland) Crans-Montana (Women's only)
  - Downhill winners: (Czech Republic) Ester Ledecká (1st) / (Switzerland) Priska Nufer (2nd)
- February 26 & 27: WC #28 in (Germany) Garmisch-Partenkirchen (Men's only)
  - Slalom winner: (Norway) Henrik Kristoffersen (2 times)
- March 2 – 6: WC #29 in (Norway) Kvitfjell (Men's only)
  - Downhill winner: (Canada) Cameron Alexander (1st) / (Italy) Dominik Paris
  - Super G winner: (Norway) Aleksander Aamodt Kilde
- March 5 & 6: WC #30 in (Switzerland) Lenzerheide (Women's only)
  - Super G winner: (France) Romane Miradoli
  - Giant slalom winner: (France) Tessa Worley
- March 9: WC #31 in (Austria) Flachau (Men's only)
  - Slalom winner: (Norway) Atle Lie McGrath
- March 11 & 12: WC #32 in (Sweden) Are (Women's only)
  - Giant slalom winner: (Slovenia) Petra Vlhova
  - Salom winner: (Austria) Katharina Liensberger
- March 12 & 13: WC #33 in (Slovenia) Kranjska Gora (Men's only)
  - Giant slalom winner: (Norway) Henrik Kristoffersen (2 times)
- March 14 & 20: WC Final in (France) Courchevel / Méribel
  - Downhill winners: (Austria) Vincent Kriechmayr (m) / (United States) Mikaela Shiffrin (f)
  - Super G winners: (Austria) Vincent Kriechmayr (m) / (Norway) Ragnhild Mowinckel (f)
  - Team parallel winners: Switzerland (Delphine Darbellay, Livio Simonet, Andrea Ellenberger, Fadri Janutin)
  - Giant slalom winners: (Switzerland) Marco Odermatt (m) / (Italy) Federica Brignone (f)
  - Slalom winners: (Norway) Atle Lie McGrath (m) / (Slovenia) Andreja Slokar (f)

=== 2021–22 FIS Alpine Ski Europa Cup ===
- November 29 & 30, 2021: EC #1 in (Switzerland) Zinal (Men's only)
  - Men's Super G winners: (Italy) Matteo Franzoso (1st) / (Italy) Giovanni Franzoni (2nd)
- November 29 & 30, 2021: EC #2 in (Austria) Mayrhofen (Women's only)
  - Here 2nd Giant slalom competition are cancelled.
  - Giant slalom #1 winner: (Liechtenstein) Charlotte Lingg
- December 2 & 3, 2021: EC #3 in (Austria) Thurn Pass (Women's only)
  - Slalom winner: (Germany) Emma Aicher (2 times)
- December 2 & 3, 2021: EC #4 in (Norway) Kvitfjell (Women's only)
  - Competition cancelled.
- December 2 & 3, 2021: EC #5 in (Switzerland) Zinal (Men's only)
  - Giant slalom winners: (United States) Brian McLaughlin (1st) / (Switzerland) Cédric Noger (2nd)
- December 8 & 9, 2021: EC #6 in (Switzerland) Zinal (Women's only)
  - Super G winners: (Austria) Christina Ager (1st) / (Austria) Elisabeth Reisinger (2nd)
- December 9–13, 2021: EC #7 in (Italy) Santa Caterina (Men's only)
  - Downhill winners: (Switzerland) Yannick Chabloz (1st) / (Switzerland) Josua Mettler (2nd)
  - Super G winner: (Switzerland) Ralph Weber
- December 11 & 12, 2021: EC #8 in (Italy) Andalo (Women's only)
  - Giant slalom winners: (Croatia) Zrinka Ljutić (1st) / (Switzerland) Camille Rast (2nd)
- December 15, 2021: EC #9 in (Italy) Obereggen (Men's only)
  - Slalom winner: (Norway) Alexander Steen Olsen
- December 15 & 16, 2021: EC #10 in (Italy) Valle Aurina (Women's only)
  - Slalom winners: (Sweden) Elsa Fermbäck (1st) / (Austria) Chiara Mair (2nd)
- December 16, 2021: EC #11 in (Italy) Val di Fassa (Men's only)
  - Slalom winner: (France) Clément Noël
- December 18 – 21: EC #12 in (Italy) Val di Fassa (Women's only)
  - Here the Super G competition is cancelled.
  - Downhill winners: (Austria) Emily Schöpf (1st) / (Switzerland) Juliana Suter (2nd)
- December 19 & 20: EC #13 in (Austria) Glungezer (Men's only)
  - Giant slalom winner: (Andorra) Joan Verdú Sánchez (2 times)
- January 7 & 8: EC #14 in (Germany) Berchtesgaden
  - Slalom winners: (Austria) Joshua Sturm (1st) / (United Kingdom) Billy Major (2nd)
- January 10 – 16: EC #15 in (France) Orcières-Merlette (Women's only)
  - Downhill winners: (Switzerland) Juliana Suter (2 times)
  - Giant slalom winners: (France) Coralie Frasse Sombet (1st) / (Switzerland) Simone Wild (2nd)
- January 11 – 14: EC #16 in (Italy) Tarvisio (Men's only)
  - Downhill winner: (Switzerland) Lars Rösti (2 times)
- January 19 & 20: EC #17 in (Switzerland) Meiringen-Hasliberg (Women's only)
  - Slalom winner: (Switzerland) Aline Danioth (2 times) * January 20 & 21: EC #18 in (France) Vaujany
  - Slalom winners: (Germany) Fabian Himmelsbach (1st) / (Switzerland) Fadri Janutin (2nd)
- January 24 – 28: EC #19 in (Austria) St Anton (Women's only)
  - Downhill winners: (France) Esther Paslier (1st) / (Italy) Elena Dolmen (2nd)
  - Super G competitions are cancelled.
- January 24 – 27: EC #20 in (Austria) Saalbach-Hinterglemm (Men's only)
  - Downhill winners: (Canada) James Crawford (1st) / (Canada) Jeffrey Read (2nd)
  - Super G winner: (Italy) Giovanni Franzoni
- January 31 & February 1: EC #21 in (Austria) Zell am See (Women's only)
  - Slalom winner: (Switzerland) Aline Danioth
- February 2: EC #22 in (Germany) Garmisch-Partenkirchen
  - Cancelled
- February 3 & 4: EC #23 in (Italy) Sarntal (Women's only)
  - Super G winner: (Austria) Franziska Gritsch (2 times)
- February 3 & 4: EC #24 in (Austria) Reiteralm (Men's only)
  - Giant slalom winner: (Andorra) Joan Verdú Sánchez
- February 9 & 10: EC #25 in (Serbia) Kopaonik (Women's only)
  - Giant slalom winner: (Austria) Elisa Mörzinger
- February 8 – 11: EC #26 in (Norway) Kvitfjell (Men's only)
  - Downhill winners: (Switzerland) Ralph Weber (1st) / (Canada) Cameron Alexander (2nd)
  - Super G winner: (Austria) Stefan Babinsky
- February 12 & 13: EC #27 in (Slovenia) Maribor (Women's only)
  - Giant slalom winners: (Austria) Franziska Gritsch (1st) / (Canada) Lisa Nyberg (2nd)
- February 14 – 19: EC #28 in (Norway) Oppdal (Men's only)
  - Super G winners: (Norway) Markus Fossland (1st) / (Italy) Giovanni Franzoni (2nd)
  - Giant slalom winners: (Andorra) Joan Verdú Sánchez (1st) / (Sweden) Fadri Janutin (2nd)
- February 17 – 19: EC #29 in (Switzerland) Crans-Montana (Women's only)
  - Downhill winners: (Austria) Franziska Gritsch (1st) / (Norway) Inni Wembstad (2nd)
- February 22 & 23: EC #30 in (Sweden) Almaasa (Men's only)
  - Slalom winners: (Switzerland) Noel von Grünigen (1st) / (France) Steven Amiez (2nd)
- February 24 & 25: EC #31 in (Germany) Bad Wiessee (Women's only)
  - Slalom winners: (Austria) Franziska Gritsch (2 times)
- March 14 – 20: EC Final in (Andorra) Soldeu/El Tarter
  - Downhill winners: Cancelled
  - Slalom winners: (Norway) Alexander Steen Olsen (m) / (Switzerland) Aline Danioth (f)
  - Giant slalom winners: (Belgium) Sam Maes (m) / (Switzerland) Simone Wild (f)
  - Super G winners: Cancelled

=== 2021–22 FIS Alpine Ski North American Cup ===
- November 18 – 23, 2021: NAC #1 & #2 in (United States) Copper Mountain
  - Men's giant slalom winners: (Slovakia) Andreas Žampa (1st) / (Switzerland) Thomas Tumler (2nd)
  - Women's giant slalom winners: (Sweden) Estelle Alphand (1st) / (Italy) Federica Brignone (2nd)
  - Men's slalom winners: (Canada) Liam Wallace (1st) / (United States) Luke Winters (2nd)
  - Women's slalom winners: (Canada) Kiara Alexander (1st) / (United States) Lila Lapanja (2nd)
- December 6 – 10, 2021: NAC #3 in (Canada) Lake Louise
  - Men's Downhill winner: (Canada) Jeffrey Read (2 times)
  - Women's Downhill winner: (Canada) Stefanie Fleckenstein (2 times)
  - Super G winners: (Canada) Kyle Alexander (m) / (Canada) Candace Crawford (f)
- December 12 – 18, 2021: NAC #4 in (Canada) Panorama
  - Here Alpine Combined and 1st Super G competitions are cancelled.
  - Super G #2 winners: (Canada) Riley Seger (m) / (United States) Alix Wilkinson (f)
  - Parallel giant slalom winners: (Sweden) Lukas Ermeskog (m) / (Canada) Cassidy Gray (f)
  - Men's giant slalom winners: (Canada) Liam Wallace (1st) / (United States) Cooper Cornelius (2nd)
  - Women's giant slalom winners: (Canada) Cassidy Gray (1st) / (Canada) Sarah Bennett (2nd)
  - Men's slalom winners: (Sweden) Adam Hofstedt (1st) / (Canada) Asher Jordan (2nd)
  - Women's slalom winner: (Canada) Amelia Smart (2 times)
- February 8 & 9: NAC #5 in (Canada) Georgian Peaks (Women's only)
  - Gigant slalom winner: (Canada) Britt Richardson (2 times)
- February 8 & 9: NAC #6 in (United States) Whiteface Mountain (Men's only)
  - Gigant slalom winner: (Australia) Harry Laidlaw (2 times)
  - Super G winner: (Canada) Kyle Alexander (2 times)
  - Alpine combined winners: (Canada) Kyle Alexander (1st) / (United States) Isaiah Nelson (2nd)
  - Slalom winners: (United States) Benjamin Ritchie (1st) / (Canada) Liam Wallace (2nd)
- February 10 & 11: NAC #7 in (Canada) Osler Bluff (Women's only)
  - Slalom winners: (United States) Lila Lapanja (1st) / (United States) Ava Jemison (2nd)
- February 14 & 15: NAC #8 in (United States) Burke Mountain (Men's only)
  - Gigant slalom winner: (Australia) Harry Laidlaw
  - Slalom winner: (Sweden) Fabian Ax
- February 14 & 16: NAC #9 in (United States) Whiteface Mountain (Women's only)
  - Gigant slalom winner: (United States) Katie Hensien
  - Super G winners: (Canada) Candace Crawford (1st) / (Canada) Britt Richardson (2nd)
  - Alpine combined winners: (United States) Ava Jemison (1st) / (Canada) Kiara Alexander (2nd)
  - Slalom winner: (Canada) Arianne Forget
- March 20 – April 1: NAC Final in (United States) Sugarloaf
  - Downhill winners: (United States) Jared Goldberg (m) (2 times) / (United States) Isabella Wright (f) (2nd)
  - Super G winners: Cancelled
  - Gigant slalom winners: (Canada) Riley Seger (m) / Cancelled (f)
  - Slalom winners: (United States) Benjamin Ritchie (m) / (United States) Zoe Zimmermann (f)

=== Para Events ===
- August 24 – 30, 2021: PARA #1 in (New Zealand) Coronet Peak
  - Cancelled
- September 16 & 17, 2021: PARA #2 in (New Zealand) Cardrona
  - Cancelled
- November 19 & 20, 2021: PARA #3 in (United Arab Emirates) Ski Dubai
  - Cancelled
- November 24 – 26, 2021: PARA #4 in (China) Wanlong Ski Resort
  - Men's slalom standing winner: (China) Xinjun Chen (2 times)
  - Women's slalom standing winner: (China) Xiajin Guo (2 times)
  - Men's slalom sitting winners: (China) Liang Chen (1st) / (China) Zilu Liang (2nd)
  - Women's slalom sitting winners: (China) Sitong Liu (1st) / (China) Wenjing Zhang (2nd)
  - Women's slalom vision impaired winners: (China) Daqing Zhu / Hanhan Yan (g) (2 times)
  - Gigant slalom winners:
  - Men's super G standing winners: (China) Yaniung Sun (1st) / (China) Shaojie Niu (2nd)
  - Men's super G sitting winners: (China) Liang Chen (1st) / (China) Zilu Liang (2nd)
  - Women's super G standing winner: (China) Xiajin Guo (2 times)
  - Women's super G sitting winner: (China) Wenjing Zhang (2 times)
  - Women's super G vision impaired winners: (China) Daqing Zhu / Hanhan Yan (g) (2 times)
- November 24 – 26, 2021: PARA #5 in (Canada) Panorama
  - Cancelled
- November 27 & 28, 2021: PARA #6 in (Austria) Mittersill
  - Men's slalom standing winner: Alexei Bugaev (2 times)
  - Men's slalom sitting winners: (China) Hailing Yan (1st) / (Austria) Markus Gfatterhofer (2nd)
  - Men's slalom vision impaired winners: (Austria) Johannes Aigner / Matteo Fleischmann (g) (2 times)
  - Women's slalom standing winner: (China) Mengqiu Zhang (1st) / Varvar Voronchikhina (2nd)
  - Women's slalom sitting winner: (Germany) Anna-Lena Forster (2 times)
  - Women's slalom vision impaired winners: (United Kingdom) Menna Fitzpatrick / Katie Guest (g) (2 times)
- December 1 – 5, 2021: PARA #7 in (Germany) Pitztaler Gletscher / S. Leonhard
  - Cancelled
- December 7 – 10, 2021: PARA #8 in (Austria) Steinach am Brenner
  - Cancelled
- December 13 & 14, 2021: PARA #9 in (Austria) Steinach am Brenner
  - Men's super G standing winner: (China) Jingyl Liang (2 times)
  - Men's super G sitting winner: (Norway) Jesper Pedersen (2 times)
  - Men's super G vission impaired winners: (United Kingdom) Nell Simpson / Andrew Simpson (g) (2 times)
  - Women's super G standing winner: (China) Mengqiu Zhang (2 times)
  - Women's super G sitting winners: (Japan) Momoka Muraoka (1st) / (Netherlands) Barbara Van Bergen (2nd)
  - Women's super G vission impaired winners: (United Kingdom) Menna Fitzpatrick / Katie Guest (g) (2 times)
  - Gigant slalom standing winners: (China) Jingyl Liang (m) / (China) Mengqiu Zhang (w)
  - Gigant slalom sitting winners: (Norway) Jesper Pedersen (m) / (Japan) Momoka Muraoka (w)
  - Gigant slalom vission impaired winners: (United Kingdom) Nell Simpson / Andrew Simpson (g) (m) / (United Kingdom) Menna Fitzpatrick / Katie Guest (g) (w)
- December 17 – 21, 2021: PARA #10 in (Switzerland) St. Moritz
  - Men's gigant slalom standing winners: (Switzerland) Ther Gmuer (1st) / (France) Arthur Bauchet (2 times)
  - Men's gigant slalom sitting winners: (Italy) Rene' De Silvestro (1st) / (Netherlands) Jeroen Kampschreur (2 times)
  - Men's gigant slalom vission impaired winners: (United Kingdom) Nell Simpson / Andrew Simpson (g) (1st) / (Austria) Johannes Aigner / Matteo Fleischmann (g) (2nd)/ (Italy) Giacomo Bertagnolli / Andrea Ravelli (g) (3rd)
  - Women's gigant slalom standing winners: (Sweden) Ebba Aarsjoe (2nd) / (Canada) Mollie Jepsen (2 times)
  - Women's gigant slalom sitting winners: (Germany) Anna-Lena Forster (1st) / (Japan) Momoka Muraoka (2 times)
  - Women's gigant slalom vission impaired winners: (United Kingdom) Henrieta Farkasova / Michal Cerven (g) (3 times)
  - Men's slalom standing winner: (France) Arthur Bauchet (2 times)
  - Men's slalom sitting winners: (Norway) Jesper Pedersen (1st) / (Netherlands) Jeroen Kampschreur (2nd)
  - Men's slalom vision impaired winners: (Austria) Johannes Aigner / Matteo Fleischmann (g) (2 times)
  - Women's slalom standing winner: (Sweden) Ebba Aarsjoe (1st) / (France) Marie Bochet (2nd)
  - Women's slalom sitting winner: (Japan) Momoka Muraoka (2 times)
  - Women's slalom vision impaired winners: (Austria) Barbara Aigner / Kiara Sykora (g) (2 times)
- January 4 – 6: PARA #11 in (United States) Winter Park Resort
  - Men's gigant slalom standing winner: (United States) Tyler McKenzie (2 times)
  - Men's gigant slalom sitting winners: (United States) David Allen Williams (1st) / (New Zealand) Aaron Ewen (2nd)
  - Men's gigant slalom vission impaired winners: (Republic of Ireland) Ronan Griffin / Elle Kate Murphy (g) (2 times)
  - Women's gigant slalom standing winner: (United States) Saylor O'Brien (2 times)
  - Women's gigant slalom sitting winner: (United States) Audrey Crowley (2 times)
  - Women's gigant slalom vission impaired winners: (United States) Danelle Umstead / Rob Umstead (g) (2 times)
  - Men's slalom standing winner: (New Zealand) Adam Hall (2 times)
  - Men's slalom sitting winner: (New Zealand) Aaron Ewen (2 times)
  - Men's slalom vision impaired winners: (United States) Mikhail Simanov / Richard Bolog (g) (1st) / (Republic of Ireland) Ronan Griffin / Elle Kate Murphy (g) (2nd)
  - Women's slalom standing winner: (Australia) Rae Anderson (2 times)
  - Women's slalom sitting winner: (United States) Saylor O'Brien (2 times)
  - Women's slalom vision impaired winners: (United States) Danelle Umstead / Rob Umstead (g) (2 times)
- January 11 – 26: PARA #12 in (Norway) Hafjell
  - Cancelled
- January 18 – 22: PARA #13 in (China) Beidahu Ski Resort
  - Cancelled
- January 27 – 30: PARA #13 in (Sweden) Are
  - Cancelled
- January 28 – 30: PARA #14 in (France) Les Angles
  - Cancelled
- February 2 – 4: PARA #15 in (Japan) Sugadaira
  - Men's super G standing winner: (Japan) Masahiko Tokai (2 times)
  - Men's super G sitting winners: (Japan) Akira Kano (1st) / (Japan) Takeshi Suzuki (2nd)
  - Women's super G standing winner: (Japan) Noriko Kamiyama (2 times)
  - Women's super G sitting winner: (Japan) Yoshiko Tanaka
  - Men's gigant slalom standing winner: (Japan) Masahiko Tokai (2 times)
  - Men's gigant slalom sitting winners: (Japan) Tetzu Fijuwara (1st) / (Japan) Taiki Morii (2nd)
  - Women's gigant slalom standing winner: (Japan) Noriko Kamiyama (2 times)
  - Women's gigant slalom sitting winners: (Japan) Tetzu Fijuwara (1st) / (Japan) Taiki Morii (2nd)
  - Men's slalom standing winner: (Japan) Masahiko Tokai
  - Men's slalom sitting winner: (Japan) Takeshi Suzuki
  - Women's slalom standing winner: (Japan) Noriko Kamiyama
  - Women's slalom sitting winner: (Japan) Yoshiko Tanaka
- February 7 – 13: PARA #16 in (Switzerland) Veysonnaz
  - Cancelled
- February 8 – 10: PARA #17 in (United States) Park City
  - Men's gigant slalom standing winner: (United States) Patrick Halgren (2 times)
  - Men's gigant slalom sitting winner: (United States) Matthew Ryan Brewer (2 times)
  - Men's gigant slalom vission impaired winners: (United Kingdom) Michael Kear / Louise Harrison (g) (2 times)
  - Women's gigant slalom standing winner: (Australia) Rae Anderson (2 times)
  - Women's gigant slalom sitting winner: (United States) Saylor O'Brien (2 times)
  - Men's slalom standing winner: (United States) Andrew Haraghey (2 times)
  - Men's slalom sitting winners: (United States) Zachary Williams (1st) / (United States) Kyle Taulman (2nd)
  - Men's slalom vision impaired winners: (United Kingdom) Michael Kear / Louise Harrison (g) (2 times)
  - Women's slalom standing winners: (Australia) Rae Anderson (1st) / (Canada) Tess Breasant (2nd)
  - Women's slalom sitting winner: (United States) Saylor O'Brien (2 times)
  - Women's slalom vision impaired winners: (United States) Danelle Umstead / Rob Umstead (g) (2 times)
- February 10 – 13: PARA #18 in (Czech Republic) Rokytnice nad Jizerou
  - Cancelled
- February 22 & 23: PARA #19 in (Armenia) Tasghkador
  - Cancelled
- March 7 & 8: PARA #20 in (France) Peisey-Vallandry
  - Cancelled
- March 19 & 20: PARA #21 in (France) Prapoutel
  - Cancelled
- March 25 & 27: PARA #22 in (France) Montgenèvre
  - Super G winners:
  - Gigant slalom winners:
  - Slalom winners:
- March 28 – April 1: PARA #23 in (Austria) Axams
  - Downhill winners:
  - Super G winners:
  - Gigant slalom winners:
  - Slalom winners:
- April 2 & 3: PARA #24 in (Austria) Kuehtai
  - Gigant slalom winners:
  - Slalom winners:
- April 2 & 3: PARA #25 in (Switzerland) Lenzerheide
  - Gigant slalom winners:
  - Slalom winners:
- April 2 – 6: PARA #26 in (United States) Winter Park Resort
  - Super G winners:
  - Gigant slalom winners:
  - Slalom winners:
- April 5 – 8: PARA #27 in (Japan) Nozawa Onsen
  - Gigant slalom winners:
  - Slalom winners:
- April 8 – 10: PARA #28 in (Austria) Mellau
  - Gigant slalom winners:
  - Slalom winners:

== Biathlon ==
- January 19 – 23: 2022 IBU Junior Open European Championships in (Slovenia) Pokljuka
  - Men's 15 km individual winner: (Bulgaria) Blagoy Todev
  - Women's 12.5 km individual winner: (France) Camille Coupé
  - Sprint winners: (Czech Republic) Jonáš Mareček (m) / (Germany) Selina Grotian (f)
  - Pursuit winners: (France) Paul Fontaine (m) / (Germany) Selina Grotian (f)
  - Mixed single relay winners: Germany (Johanna Puff & Darius Lodl)
  - Mixed Team relay winners: France (Camille Coupé, Jeanne Richard, Damien Levet, Jacques Jefferies)
- January 26–30: 2022 IBU Open European Championships in (Germany) Arber
  - Men's 20 km individual winner: (Norway) Sverre Dahlen Aspenes
  - Women's 15 km individual winner: (Russia) Evgeniya Burtasova
  - Sprint winners: (Norway) Erlend Bjøntegaard (m) / (Norway) Ragnhild Femsteinevik (f)
  - Pursuit winners: (Norway) Sverre Dahlen Aspenes (m) / (Moldova) Alina Stremous (f)
  - Mixed single relay winners: Russia (Anton Babikov & Evgeniya Burtasova)
  - Mixed Team relay winners: Norway (Erlend Bjøntegaard, Johannes Dale, Jenny Enodd, Ragnhild Femsteinevik)

=== 2022 Winter Olympics ===
- February 5 – 19: 2022 Winter Olympics in (China) Beijing
  - Mixed Relay 4x6km winners: (gold) : Norway, (silver) : France, (bronze) : ROC

=== 2021–22 Biathlon World Cup ===
- November 27 – 28, 2021: WC #1 in (Sweden) Östersund #1
  - Men's 20 km Individual winner: (Norway) Sturla Holm Lægreid
  - Women's 15 km Individual winner: (Czech Republic) Markéta Davidová
  - Men's 10 km Sprint winner: (Sweden) Sebastian Samuelsson
  - Women's 7.5 km Sprint winner: (Sweden) Hanna Öberg
- December 2 – 5, 2021: WC #2 in (Sweden) Östersund #2
  - Men's 10 km Sprint winner: (Sweden) Sebastian Samuelsson
  - Women's 7.5 km Sprint winner: (Austria) Lisa Theresa Hauser
  - Men's 12.5 km Pursuit winner: (Norway) Vetle Sjåstad Christiansen
  - Women's 10 km Pursuit winner: (Norway) Marte Olsbu Røiseland
  - Men's 4x7.5 km Relay winners: Norway (Sivert Guttorm Bakken, Tarjei Bø, Johannes Thingnes Bø, Vetle Sjåstad Christiansen)
  - Women's 4x6 km Relay winners: France (Anaïs Bescond, Anaïs Chevalier-Bouchet, Julia Simon, Justine Braisaz-Bouchet)
- December 10 – 12, 2021: WC #3 in (Austria) Hochfilzen
  - Men's 10 km Sprint winner: (Germany) Johannes Kühn
  - Women's 7.5 km Sprint winner: (Belarus) Hanna Sola
  - Men's 12.5 km Pursuit winner: (France) Quentin Fillon Maillet
  - Women's 10 km Pursuit winner: (Norway) Marte Olsbu Røiseland
  - Women's 4x6 km Relay winners: Sweden (Linn Persson, Anna Magnusson, Elvira Öberg, Hanna Öberg)
  - Men's 4x7.5 km Relay winners: Norway (Sturla Holm Lægreid, Tarjei Bø, Johannes Thingnes Bø, Vetle Sjåstad Christiansen)
- December 16 – 19, 2021: WC #4 in (France) Le Grand-Bornand
  - Women's 7.5 km Sprint winner: (Norway) Marte Olsbu Røiseland
  - Men's 10 km Sprint winner: (Norway) Johannes Thingnes Bø
  - Women's 10 km Pursuit winner: (Sweden) Elvira Öberg
  - Men's 12.5 km Pursuit winner: (France) Quentin Fillon Maillet
  - Women's 12.5 km Mass Start winner: (Sweden) Elvira Öberg
  - Men's 15 km Mass Start winner: (France) Émilien Jacquelin
- January 7 – 9: WC #5 in (Germany) Oberhof
  - Men's 10 km Sprint winner: (Russia) Alexandr Loginov
  - Women's 7.5 km Sprint winner: (Norway) Marte Olsbu Røiseland
  - Mixed 4x7.5 km Relay winners: Norway (Tarjei Bø, Johannes Thingnes Bø, Ingrid Landmark Tandrevold, Marte Olsbu Røiseland)
  - Mixed 1x6 km+1x7.5 km Single Relay winners: (Russia) Anton Babikov & Kristina Reztsova
  - Men's 12.5 km Pursuit winner: (France) Quentin Fillon Maillet
  - Women's 10 km Pursuit winner: (Norway) Marte Olsbu Røiseland
- January 12 – 16: WC #6 in (Germany) Ruhpolding
  - Women's 7.5 km Sprint winner: (Sweden) Elvira Öberg
  - Men's 10 km Sprint winner: (France) Quentin Fillon Maillet
  - Women's 4x6 km Relay winners: France (Anaïs Chevalier-Bouchet, Chloé Chevalier, Justine Braisaz-Bouchet, Julia Simon)
  - Men's 4x7.5 km Relay winners: Russia (Said Karimulla Khalili, Daniil Serokhvostov, Alexander Loginov, Maxim Tsvetkov)
  - Women's 10 km Pursuit winner: (Norway) Marte Olsbu Røiseland
  - Men's 12.5 km Pursuit winner: (France) Quentin Fillon Maillet
- January 20 – 23: WC #7 in (Italy) Antholz-Anterselva
  - Men's 20 km Individual winner: (Russia) Anton Babikov
  - Women's 15 km Individual winner: (France) Justine Braisaz-Bouchet
  - Men's 15 km Mass Start winner: (Germany) Benedikt Doll
  - Women's 4x6 km Relay winners: Norway (Karoline Offigstad Knotten, Tiril Eckhoff, Ida Lien, Ingrid Landmark Tandrevold)
  - Men's 4x7.5 km Relay winners: Norway (Sturla Holm Lægreid, Tarjei Bø, Johannes Thingnes Bø, Vetle Sjåstad Christiansen)
  - Women's 12.5 km Mass Start winner: (Italy) Dorothea Wierer
- March 3 – 6: WC #8 in (Finland) Kontiolahti
  - Women's 4x6 km Relay winners: Norway (Marte Olsbu Røiseland, Tiril Eckhoff, Ida Lien, Ingrid Landmark Tandrevold)
  - Men's 4x7.5 km Relay winners: Norway (Sivert Guttorm Bakken, Filip Fjeld Andersen, Sturla Holm Lægreid, Vetle Sjåstad Christiansen)
  - Women's 7.5 km Sprint winner: (Germany) Denise Herrmann
  - Men's 10 km Sprint winner: (France) Quentin Fillon Maillet
  - Women's 10 km Pursuit winner: (Norway) Tiril Eckhoff
  - Men's 12.5 km Pursuit winner: (France) Quentin Fillon Maillet
- March 10 – 13: WC #9 in (Estonia) Otepää
  - Men's 10 km Sprint winner: (France) Quentin Fillon Maillet
  - Women's 7.5 km Sprint winner: (France) Julia Simon
  - Men's 15 km Mass Start winner: (Norway) Vetle Sjåstad Christiansen
  - Women's 12.5 km Mass Start winner: (Sweden) Elvira Öberg
  - Mixed 4x7.5 km Relay winners: Norway (Sivert Guttorm Bakken, Vetle Sjåstad Christiansen, Tiril Eckhoff, Ingrid Landmark Tandrevold)
  - Mixed 1x6 km+1x7.5 km Single Relay winners: (Norway) Sturla Holm Lægreid & Marte Olsbu Røiseland
- March 18 – 20: WC #10 in (Norway) Oslo Holmenkollen
  - Women's 7.5 km Sprint winner: (Norway) Tiril Eckhoff
  - Men's 10 km Sprint winner: (Norway) Sturla Holm Lægreid
  - Women's 10 km Pursuit winner: (Norway) Tiril Eckhoff
  - Men's 12.5 km Pursuit winner: (Germany) Erik Lesser
  - Women's 12.5 km Mass Start winner: (France) Justine Braisaz-Bouchet
  - Men's 15 km Mass Start winner: (Norway) Sivert Guttorm Bakken

=== 2021–22 Biathlon IBU Cup ===
- November 25–28, 2021: IBU Cup #1 in (Sweden) Idre
  - Men's Sprint winners: (Germany) Lucas Fratzscher (1st) / (Norway) Aleksander Fjeld Andersen (2nd)
  - Women's Sprint winners: (Germany) Marion Wiesensarter (1st) / (Germany) Franziska Hildebrand (2nd)
  - Pursuit winners: (Russia) Vasilii Tomshin (m) / (Germany) Franziska Hildebrand (f)
- December 1–4, 2021: IBU Cup #2 in (Norway) Sjusjøen
  - Super Sprint winners: (Norway) Filip Fjeld Andersen (m) / (Italy) Linda Zingerle (f)
  - Sprint winners: (Russia) Anton Babikov (m) / (Russia) Anastasia Shevchenko (f)
  - Mass start winners: (Russia) Anton Babikov (m) / (Norway) Ragnhild Femsteinevik (f)
- December 16–19, 2021: IBU Cup #3 in (Austria) Obertilliach
  - Men's 20 km Individual winner: (Germany) David Zobel
  - Women's 15 km Individual winner: (Sweden) Elisabeth Högberg
  - Sprint winners: (Norway) Håvard Gutubø Bogetveit (m) / (Russia) Anastasia Shevchenko (f)
  - Single Mixed Relay winners: Russia (Evgeniya Burtasova & Anton Babikov)
  - Mixed Relay winners: Russia (Anastasia Shevchenko, Anastasiia Goreeva, Nikita Porshnev, Maxim Tsvetkov)
- January 8 & 9: IBU Cup #4 in (Slovakia) Brezno-Osrblie
  - Men's Sprint winners: (Norway) Aleksander Fjeld Andersen (1st) / (Norway) Sindre Fjellheim Jorde (2nd)
  - Women's Sprint winners: (Norway) Ragnhild Femsteinevik (1st) / (Russia) Larisa Kuklina (2nd)
- January 12–15: IBU Cup #5 in (Slovakia) Brezno-Osrblie
  - Short Individual winners: (Norway) Vetle Paulsen (m) / (Germany) Janina Hettich (f)
  - Sprint winners: (France) Émilien Claude (m) / (France) Camille Bened (f)
  - Women's Pursuit winner: (France) Evgeniya Burtasova
- January 26–30: IBU Cup #6 in (Germany) Arber (2022 IBU Open European Championships)
  - Men's 20 km individual winner: (Norway) Sverre Dahlen Aspenes
  - Women's 15 km individual winner: (Russia) Evgeniya Burtasova
  - Sprint winners: (Norway) Erlend Bjøntegaard (m) / (Norway) Ragnhild Femsteinevik (f)
  - Pursuit winners: (Norway) Sverre Dahlen Aspenes (m) / (Moldova) Alina Stremous (f)
  - Mixed single relay winners: Russia (Anton Babikov & Evgeniya Burtasova)
  - Mixed Team relay winners: Norway (Erlend Bjøntegaard, Johannes Dale, Jenny Enodd, Ragnhild Femsteinevik)
- February 3–5: IBU Cup #7 in (Czech Republic) Nové Město
- March 3–6: IBU Cup #8 in (Switzerland) Lenzerheide
- March 10–13: IBU Cup #9 in (Italy) Ridnaun-Val Ridanna (final)

== Cross-country skiing ==
=== 2022 Winter Olympics ===
- February 5 – 20: Cross-country skiing at the 2022 Winter Olympics in (China) Beijing
  - Women's Skiathlon: (gold) : (Norway) Therese Johaug, (silver) : (Russia) Natalya Nepryayeva, (bronze) : (Austria) Teresa Stadlober

=== 2021–22 FIS Cross-Country World Cup ===
- November 26–28, 2021: WC #1 in (Finland) Ruka
  - Sprint Classic winners: (Russia) Alexander Terentyev (m) / (Sweden) Maja Dahlqvist (f)
  - Men's 15 km Classic winner: (Finland) Iivo Niskanen
  - Women's 10 km Classic winner: (Sweden) Frida Karlsson
  - Men's 15 km Freestyle Pursuit winner: (Russia) Alexander Bolshunov
  - Women's 10 km Freestyle Pursuit winner: (Norway) Therese Johaug
- December 3–5, 2021: WC #2 in Lillehammer
  - Sprint Freestyle winners: (Norway) Johannes Høsflot Klæbo (m) / (Sweden) Maja Dahlqvist (f)
  - Men's 15 km Freestyle winner: (Norway) Simen Hegstad Krüger
  - Women's 10 km Freestyle winner: (Sweden) Frida Karlsson
  - Men's 4 x 7.5 km Relay C/F winners: Norway I (Erik Valnes, Emil Iversen, Simen Hegstad Krüger, Johannes Høsflot Klæbo)
  - Women's 4 x 5 km Relay C/F winners: Russia I (Yuliya Stupak, Natalya Nepryayeva, Tatiana Sorina, Veronika Stepanova)
- December 11 & 12, 2021: WC #3 in (Switzerland) Davos
  - Sprint Freestyle winners: (Norway) Johannes Høsflot Klæbo (m) / (Sweden) Maja Dahlqvist (f)
  - Men's 15 km Freestyle winner: (Norway) Simen Hegstad Krüger
  - Women's 10 km Freestyle winner: (Norway) Therese Johaug
- December 18 & 19, 2021: WC #4 in (Germany) Dresden
  - Sprint Freestyle winners: (Norway) Håvard Solås Taugbøl (m) / (Sweden) Maja Dahlqvist (f)
  - Men's Team Sprint Freestyle winners: Norway II (Thomas Helland Larsen & Even Northug)
  - Women's Team Sprint Freestyle winners: Sweden I (Jonna Sundling & Maja Dahlqvist)
- December 28 & 29: WC #5 in (Switzerland) Lenzerheide (1st round of 2021–22 Tour de Ski)
  - Sprint Freestyle winners: (Norway) Johannes Høsflot Klæbo (m) / (United States) Jessie Diggins (f)
  - Men's 15 km Classic winner: (Finland) Iivo Niskanen
  - Women's 10 km Classic winner: (Finland) Kerttu Niskanen
- December 31, 2021 & January 1: WC #6 in (Germany) Oberstdorf (2nd round of 2021–22 Tour de Ski)
  - Men's 15 km Freestyle Mass Start winner: (Norway) Johannes Høsflot Klæbo
  - Women's 10 km Freestyle Mass Start winner: (United States) Jessie Diggins
  - Sprint Classic winners: (Norway) Johannes Høsflot Klæbo (m) / (Russia) Natalya Nepryayeva (f)
- January 3 & 4: WC #7 in (Italy) Val di Fiemme (3rd round of 2021–22 Tour de Ski)
  - Women's 10 km Classic Mass Start winner: (Russia) Natalya Nepryayeva
  - Men's 15 km Classic Mass Start winner: (Norway) Johannes Høsflot Klæbo
  - Women's 10 km Freestyle Mass Start Climb winner: (Norway) Heidi Weng
  - Men's 10 km Freestyle Mass Start Climb winner: (Norway) Sjur Røthe
  - 2021–22 Tour de Ski winners: (Norway) Johannes Høsflot Klæbo (m) / (Russia) Natalya Nepryayeva
- January 14 – 16: WC #8 in (France) Les Rousses
  - Cancelled due to the COVID-19 pandemic.
- January 22 & 23: WC #9 in (Slovenia) Planica
  - Cancelled due to the COVID-19 pandemic.
- February 26 & 27: WC #10 in (Finland) Lahti
  - Sprint Freestyle winners: (Norway) Johannes Høsflot Klæbo (m) / (Sweden) Jonna Sundling (f)
  - Women's 10 km Classic winner: (Norway) Therese Johaug
  - Men's 15 km Classic winner: (Finland) Iivo Niskanen
- March 3: WC #11 in (Norway) Drammen
  - Sprint Classic winners: (France) Richard Jouve (m) / (Norway) Maiken Caspersen Falla (f)
- March 5 & 6: WC #12 in (Norway) Oslo
  - Women's 30 km Classic Mass Start winner: (Norway) Therese Johaug
  - Men's 50 km Classic Mass Start winner: (Norway) Martin Løwstrøm Nyenget
- March 11 – 13: WC #13 in Falun
  - Sprint Classic winners: (France) Richard Jouve (m) / (Sweden) Jonna Sundling (f)
  - Men's 15 km Freestyle winner: (Norway) Didrik Tønseth
  - Women's 10 km Freestyle winner: (Norway) Therese Johaug
  - 4 x 5 km Mixed Relay Freestyle winners: United States I (Rosie Brennan, Zak Ketterson, Scott Patterson, Jessie Diggins)
  - Mixed Team Sprint Freestyle winners: Sweden I (Jonna Sundling & Calle Halfvarsson)

=== 2021–22 FIS Cross-Country Continental Cup ===
==== 2021–22 OPA Cross Country Alpen Cup ====
- December 3–5, 2021: OPA #1 in (Switzerland) Ulrichen
  - Men's 15 km Classic winner: (Germany) Albert Küchler
  - Women's 10 km Classic winner: (Germany) Katherine Sauerbrey
  - Men's 1.5 km Sprint Freestyle winner: (Italy) Francesco Manzoni
  - Women's 1.3 km Sprint Freestyle winner: (Austria) Lisa Unterweger
  - Men's 15 km Freestyle Mass Start winner: (France) Tom Mancini
  - Women's 10 km Freestyle Mass Start winner: (Germany) Katherine Sauerbrey
- December 18 & 19, 2021: OPA #2 in (Austria) Sankt Ulrich am Pillersee
  - Men's 15 km Classic winner: (Russia) Evgeniy Belov
  - Women's 10 km Classic winner: (Germany) Katherine Sauerbrey
  - Men's 15 km Freestyle Mass Start winner: (Switzerland) Cyril Fähndrich
  - Women's 10 km Freestyle Mass Start winner: (Germany) Katherine Sauerbrey
- January 7 – 9: OPA #3 in (Czech Republic) Nové Město na Moravě
  - Cancelled, moved to Sankt Ulrich am Pillersee
- January 8 & 9: OPA #3 in (Austria) Sankt Ulrich am Pillersee
  - Sprint Freestyle winners: (Switzerland) Valerio Grond (m) / (Switzerland) Alina Meier (f)
  - Men's 15 km Classic winner: (Switzerland) Jason Rüesch
  - Women's 10 km Classic winner: (Switzerland) Nadja Kälin
- January 22 & 23: OPA #4 in (Germany) Oberstdorf
  - Sprint Classic winners: (France) Jules Chappaz (m) / (Germany) Laura Gimmler (f)
  - Men's 30 km Freestyle Mass Start winner: (Switzerland) Jason Rüesch
  - Women's 20 km Freestyle Mass Start winner: (Germany) Lisa Lohmann

==== 2021 Australia/New Zealand Cup ====
- August 7 & 8, 2021: ANC #1 in (Australia) Perisher Valley
  - 1.2 km Sprint Freestyle winners: (Australia) Phillip Bellingham (m) / (Australia) Casey Wright (f)
  - Men's 15 km Classic winner: (Australia) Phillip Bellingham
  - Women's 10 km Classic winner: (Australia) Casey Wright
- September 4 & 5, 2021: ANC #2 in (Australia) Falls Creek (final)
  - Competition cancelled.
  - Overall winners: (Australia) Phillip Bellingham (m) / (Australia) Casey Wright (f)

==== 2022 FIS Cross-Country Balkan Cup ====
- January 12 & 13: BC #1 in (Serbia) Zlatibor
  - Men's 10 km Classic winners: (Bulgaria) Daniel Peshkov (1st) / (Spain) Bernat Sellés Gasch (2nd)
  - Women's 5 km Classic winner: (Spain) Marta Moreno Ramos (2 times)

==== 2021–22 FIS Cross-Country Eastern Europe Cup ====
- November 13 – 15, 2021: EEC #1 in (Kazakhstan) Shchuchinsk
  - 1.2 km Sprint Classic winners: (Russia) Andrey Kuznetsov (m) / (Russia) Nataliya Mekryukova (f)
  - Men's 10 km Classic winner: (Russia) Andrey Kuznetsov
  - Women's 5 km Classic winner: (Russia) Nataliya Mekryukova
  - Men's 15 km Freestyle winner: (Russia) Sergey Volkov
  - Women's 10 km Freestyle winner: (Russia) Ekaterina Smirnova
- November 27 – December 1, 2021: EEC #2 in (Russia) Vershina Tyoi
  - Men's 1.7 Sprint Classic winners: (Russia) Andrey Kuznetsov (1st) / (Russia) Fedor Nazarov (2nd)
  - Women's 1.5 Sprint Classic winners: (Russia) Alesya Rushentseva (1st) / (Russia) Ekaterina Smirnova (2nd)
  - Men's 15 km Freestyle winner: (Russia) Ilya Proshkin
  - Women's 10 km Freestyle winner: (Russia) Evgeniya Krupitskaya
  - Men's 15 km Classic winner: (Russia) Ilya Proshkin
  - Women's 10 km Classic winner: (Russia) Dariya Nepryaeva
- December 18 – 21, 2021: EEC #3 in (Russia) Kirovo-Chepetsk
  - Sprint Freestyle winners: (Russia) Sergey Ardashev (m) / (Russia) Olga Kucheruk (f)
  - Men's 15 km Fresstyle winner: (Russia) Andrey Larkov
  - Women's 10 km Freestyle winner: (Russia) Ekaterina Smirnova
  - Men's 30 km Classic winner: (Russia) Andrey Larkov
  - Women's 15 km Classic winner: (Russia) Ekaterina Smirnova
- January 4 – 7: EEC #4 in (Belarus) Minsk–Raubichi
  - Sprint Freestyle winners: (Russia) Sergey Ardashev (m) / (Belarus) Anastasia Kirillova (f)
  - Men's 10 km Classic winner: (Russia) Ilya Poroshkin
  - Women's 5 km Classic winner: (Belarus) Anastasia Kirillova
  - Men's 30 km Freestyle Must Start winner: (Russia) Andrey Larkov
  - Women's 15 km Freestyle Must Start winner: (Belarus) Hanna Karaliova

==== 2022 FIS Cross-Country Nor-Am Cup ====
- January 6 – 11: NAC #1 in (Canada) Canmore (final)
  - Sprint Freestyle winners: (Canada) Antoine Cyr (m) / (Canada) Laura Leclair (f)
  - Men's 15 km Classic winner: (Canada) Antoine Cyr
  - Women's 10 km Classic winner: (Canada) Katherine Stewart-Jones
  - Men's 30 km Freestyle Mass Start winner: (Canada) Russell Kennedy
  - Women's 15 km Freestyle Mass Start winner: Katherine Stewart-Jones
  - Sprint Classic winners: (Canada) Xavier McKeever (m) / (Canada) Olivia Bouffard-Nesbitt (f)
  - Overall winners: (Canada) Antoine Cyr (m) / (Canada) Katherine Stewart-Jones (f)

==== 2021–22 FIS Alpine Ski Far East Cup ====
- December 25 – 27, 2021: FEC #1 in (Japan) Otoineppu
  - cancelled, moved to Pyeongchang on the same dates.
- December 25 – 27, 2021: FEC #1 in (South Korea) Pyeongchang
  - Men's 10 km Classic winner: (South Korea) Kim Min-woo
  - Women's 5 km Classic winner: (South Korea) Lee Eui-jin
  - Men's 10 km Freestyle winner: (South Korea) Kim Eun-ho
  - Women's 5 km Freestyle winner: (South Korea) Lee Chae-won
- January 8 – 10: FEC #2, #3 and #4 in (Japan) Sapporo
  - Men's 10 km Classic winner: (Japan) Ryo Hirose
  - Women's 5 km Classic winner: (Japan) Masao Tsuchiya
  - Men's 10 km Freestyle winner: (Japan) Haruki Yamashita
  - Women's 5 km Freestyle winner: (Japan) Masao Tsuchiya
  - Sprint Classic winners: (Japan) Takanori Ebina (m) / (Japan) Miki Kodama (f)
- January 18 – 19: FEC #5 in (South Korea) Alpensia
  - Men's 10 km Classic winner: (South Korea) Byun Ji-yeong
  - Women's 5 km Classic winner: (South Korea) Lee Eui-jin
  - Men's 10 km Freestyle winner: (South Korea) Jeong Jong-won
  - Women's 5 km Freestyle winner: (South Korea) Lee Chae-won

==== 2021–22 Scandinavian Cup ====
- December 10 – 12, 2021: SCAN #1 in (Norway) Beitostølen
  - Men's 15 km Classic winner: (Norway) Didrik Tønseth
  - Women's 10 km Classic winner: (Norway) Silje Theodorsen
  - Sprint Classic winners: (Norway) Aron Åkre Rysstad (m) / (Norway) Anna Svendsen (f)
  - Men's 15 km Freestyle winner: (Norway) Didrik Tønseth
  - Women's 10 km Freestyle winner: (Norway) Silje Theodorsen
- January 7 – 9: SCAN #2 in (Sweden) Falun
  - Sprint Freestyle winners: (Sweden) Karl-Johan Westberg (m) / (Sweden) Jonna Sundling (f)
  - Men's 15 km Classic winner: (Sweden) William Poromaa
  - Women's 10 km Classic winner: (Sweden) Jonna Sundling
  - Men's 15 km Freestyle winner: (Sweden) William Poromaa
  - Women's 10 km Freestyle winner: (Sweden) Jonna Sundling

==== 2021–22 Slavic Cup ====
- December 18 & 19, 2021: SC #1 in (Slovakia) Štrbské Pleso
  - Cancelled.
- January 11 – 12: SC #2 in (Poland) Zakopane
  - Sprint Freestyle winners: (Poland) Dominik Bury (m) / (Poland) Monika Skinder (f)
  - Men's 15 km Classic winner: (Poland) Dominik Bury
  - Women's 10 km Classic winner: (Poland) Izabela Marcisz

==== 2021–22 US SuperTour ====
- December 4 & 5, 2021: UST #1 in (United States) Spirit Mountain
  - Sprint Freestyle winners: (United States) Tyler Kornfield (m) / (United States) Becca Rorabaugh (f)
  - Men's 10 km Freestyle winner: (United States) Zak Ketterson
  - Women's 5 km Freestyle winner: (United States) Rosie Frankowski
- December 10 – 12, 2021: UST #2 in (United States) Cable
  - Mass Start winners: (Canada) Philippe Boucher (m) / (United States) Rosie Frankowski (f)
  - Sprint Classic winners: (United States) Zak Ketterson (m) / (United States) Alayna Sonnesyn (f)
  - Men's 15 km Classic winner: (United States) Adam Martin
  - Women's 10 km Classic winner: (United States) Alayna Sonnesyn (f)
- January 7: UST #3 in (United States) Soldier Hollow
  - Sprint Classic winners: (Norway) Magnus Bøe (m) / (United States) Katharine Ogden (f)
- January 15 & 16: UST #4 in (United States) Lake Creek Nordic Center
  - Men's 10 km Freestyle winner: (United States) John Steel Hagenbuch
  - Women's 5 km Freestyle winner: (United States) Rosie Brennan
  - Mass Start winners: (United States) David Norris (m) / (United States) Rosie Brennan (f)

== Freestyle skiing ==
=== 2021–22 FIS Freestyle Ski World Cup ===
Aerials

- December 2 & 3, 2021: WC #1 in (Finland) Ruka
  - Men's winner: (Russia) Maxim Burov (2 times)
  - Women's winners: (China) Kong Fanyu (1st) / (China) Xu Mengtao (2nd)
  - Teams winner: China (Xu Mengtao, Jia Zongyang, Qi Guangpu)
- December 10 & 11, 2021: WC #2 in (Finland) Ruka
  - Men's winner: (Russia) Maxim Burov (2 times)
  - Women's winners: (Ukraine) Anastasiya Novosad (1st) / (Australia) Danielle Scott (2nd)
  - Teams winner: China (Xu Mengtao, Sun Jiaxu, Qi Guangpu)
- January 6: WC #3 in (Canada) Le Relais
  - Winners: (China) Sun Jiaxu (m) / (China) Xu Mengtao (f)
- January 12: WC #4 in (United States) Deer Valley
  - Winners: (China) Wang Xindi (m) / (Australia) Laura Peel (f)
- World Cup winners: (Russia) Maxim Burov (m) / (China) Xu Mengtao (f)

Freeski Big Air

- October 22, 2021: WC #1 in (Switzerland) Chur
  - Winners: (Austria) Matěj Švancer (m) / (France) Tess Ledeux (f)
- December 3 & 4, 2021: WC #2 in (United States) Steamboat (final)
  - Winners: (Austria) Matěj Švancer (m) / (China) Eileen Gu (f)
- World Cup winners: (Austria) Matěj Švancer (m) / (France) Tess Ledeux (f)

Freeski Halfpipe

- December 8–10, 2021: WC #1 in (United States) Copper Mountain
  - Winners: (United States) Alex Ferreira (m) / (China) Eileen Gu (f)
- December 30, 2021 – January 1: WC #2 in (Canada) Calgary
  - Men's winner: (Canada) Brendan Mackay (2 times)
  - Women's winner: (China) Eileen Gu (2 times)
- January 6 – 9: WC #3 in (United States) Mammoth Mountain
  - Winners: (New Zealand) Nico Porteous (m) / (China) Eileen Gu (f)
- World Cup winners: (Canada) Brendan Mackay (m) / (China) Eileen Gu (f)

Freeski Slopestyle

- November 19 & 20, 2021: WC #1 in (Austria) Stubai
  - Winners: (Norway) Birk Ruud (m) / (Estonia) Kelly Sildaru (f)
- January 6 – 9: WC #2 in (United States) Mammoth Mountain
  - Winners: (United States) Alex Hall (m) / (Estonia) Kelly Sildaru (f)
- January 14 – 16: WC #3 in (France) Font Romeu
  - Winners: (Switzerland) Andri Ragettli (m) / (France) Tess Ledeux (f)
- March 3 – 5: WC #4 in (Georgia (country)) Bakuriani
  - Winners: (Switzerland) Andri Ragettli (m) / (Canada) Megan Oldham (f)
- March 10 – 12: WC #5 in (France) Tignes
  - Men's winner: (Norway) Birk Ruud
- March 24 – 26: WC #6 in (Switzerland) Silvaplana
  - Winners: (Norway) Birk Ruud (m) / (Estonia) Kelly Sildaru (f)
- World Cup Winners: (Switzerland) Andri Ragettli (m) / (Estonia) Kelly Sildaru (f)

Moguls

- December 4, 2021: WC #1 in (Finland) Ruka
  - Winners: (Canada) Mikaël Kingsbury (m) / (United States) Olivia Giaccio (f)
- December 11, 2021: WC #2 in (Sweden) Idre
  - Winners: (Japan) Ikuma Horishima (m) / (Japan) Anri Kawamura (f)
- December 17, 2021: WC #3 in (France) Alpe d'Huez
  - Winners: (Japan) Ikuma Horishima (m) / (Australia) Jakara Anthony (f)
- January 7 & 8: WC #4 in (Canada) Mont-Tremblant
  - Men's winner: (Canada) Mikaël Kingsbury (2 times)
  - Women's winners: (Japan) Anri Kawamura (1st) / (France) Perrine Laffont (2nd)
- January 13 & 14: WC #5 in (United States) Deer Valley
  - Men's winners: (Canada) Mikaël Kingsbury (1st) / (Japan) Ikuma Horishima (2nd)
  - Women's winners: (France) Perrine Laffont (1st) / (Japan) Anri Kawamura (2nd)
- March 18: WC #6 in (France) Megève
  - Winners: (Canada) Mikaël Kingsbury (m) / (France) Perrine Laffont (f)
- World Cup Winners: (Canada) Mikaël Kingsbury (m) / (France) Perrine Laffont (f)

Dual Moguls

- December 12, 2021: WC #1 in (Sweden) Idre
  - Winners: (Canada) Mikaël Kingsbury (m) / (France) Perrine Laffont (f)
- December 18, 2021: WC #2 in (France) Alpe d'Huez
  - Winners: (Canada) Mikaël Kingsbury (m) / (Australia) Jakara Anthony (f)
- March 12: WC #3 in (Italy) Chiesa in Valmalenco
  - Winners: (Canada) Mikaël Kingsbury (m) / (Australia) Jakara Anthony (f)
- March 19: WC #4 in (France) Megève
  - Winners: (Canada) Mikaël Kingsbury (m) / (France) Perrine Laffont (f)
- World Cup Winners: (Canada) Mikaël Kingsbury (m) / (Australia) Jakara Anthony (f)

Ski Cross

- November 25 – 27, 2021: WC #1 in (China) Secret Garden
  - Men's winner: (Russia) Sergey Ridzik
  - Women's winner: (Sweden) Sandra Näslund
- December 10 – 12, 2021: WC #2 in (France) Val Thorens
  - Men's winners: (France) Terence Tchiknavorian / (Switzerland) Alex Fiva
  - Women's winners: (Sweden) Sandra Näslund (2 times)
- December 13 – 15, 2021: WC #3 in (Switzerland) Arosa
  - Men's winner: (Sweden) David Mobärg
  - Women's winner: (Canada) Marielle Thompson
  - Teams winner: Sweden I (David Mobärg & Sandra Näslund)
- December 18 – 20, 2021: WC #4 in (Italy) Innichen
  - Men's winners: (Switzerland) Ryan Regez (1st) / (France) Bastien Midol
  - Women's winner: (Sweden) Sandra Näslund (2 times)
- January 13 – 15: WC #5 in (Canada) Nakiska
  - Men's winners: (Sweden) David Mobärg (1st) / (Canada) Kristofor Mahler
  - Women's winner: (Sweden) Sandra Näslund (2 times)
- January 21 – 23: WC #6 in (Sweden) Idre
  - Men's winner: (Switzerland) Ryan Regez (2 times)
  - Women's winner: (Sweden) Sandra Näslund (2 times)
- March 11 – 13: WC #7 in (Austria) Reiteralm
  - Men's winner: (Canada) Reece Howden
  - Women's winner: (Sweden) Sandra Näslund
- March 19: WC #8 in (Switzerland) Veysonnaz
  - Men's winner: (Sweden) David Mobärg
  - Women's winner: (Sweden) Sandra Näslund
- World Cup Winners: (Switzerland) Ryan Regez (m) / (Sweden) Sandra Näslund (f)

=== 2021–22 FIS Freestyle Europa Cup ===
Freeski Big Air

- January 6 – 8: EC #1 in (France) Les Arcs
  - Winners: (France) Timothé Sivignon (m) / (France) Kim Dumont-Zanella (f)

Dual Moguls

- January 23: WC #1 in (Sweden) Åre
  - Winners: (Sweden) Filip Gravenfors (m) / (Germany) Hanna Weese

Moguls

- January 22: WC #1 in (Sweden) Åre
  - Winners: (Sweden) Rasmus Stegfeldt (m) / (France) Fantine Degroote (f)

Freeski Slopestyle

- January 19 – 21: EC #1 in (France) Alpe d'Huez
  - Winners: (Italy) Miro Tabanelli (m) / (France) Jade Michaud (f)

Ski Cross

- November 21, 2021: EC #1 in (Austria) Pitztal
  - Ski Cross winners: (Italy) Simone Deromedis (m) / (Italy) Jole Galli (f)
- November 24 & 25, 2021: EC #2 in (Austria) Pitztal
  - Competition cancelled.
- November 27 & 28, 2021: EC #3 in (Sweden) Idre
  - Competition cancelled.
- December 10 & 11, 2021: EC #4 in (Italy) San Pellegrino Pass
  - Competition cancelled.
- December 16 – 18, 2021: EC #5 in (France) Val Thorens
  - Here the 3rd competition is cancelled.
  - Men's winners: (France) Alexis Jay (1st) / (Austria) Mathias Graf (2nd)
  - Women's winner: (France) Mylène Ballet-Baz (2 times)
- January 14 – 16: EC #6 in (Austria) Reiteralm
  - Men's winner: (Austria) Mathias Graf (2 times)
  - Women's winners: (Germany) Celia Funkler (1st) / (Switzerland) Saskja Lack (2nd)
- January 20 – 22: EC #7 in (Switzerland) Lenk
  - Men's winners: (Switzerland) Luca Lubasch (1st) / (Austria) Mathias Graf (2nd)
  - Women's winners: (France) Mylène Ballet-Baz (1st) / (Austria) Sonja Gigler (2nd)

=== 2021–22 FIS Freestyle American Cup ===
Moguls

- January 20: NAC #1 in (United States) Deer Valley
  - Winners: (Canada) Julien Viel (m) / (Japan) Haruka Nakao (f)

Dual Moguls

- January 21: NAC #1 in (United States) Deer Valley
  - Winners: (Canada) Daniel Tanner (m) / (United States) Kasey Hogg (f)

Ski Cross

- December 16 – 19, 2021: NAC #1 in (Canada) Nakiska
  - Men's winners: (Australia) Alfred Wenk (1st) / (Canada) Phillip Tremblay (2nd)
  - Women's winners: (Canada) Kiersten Wincett (1st) / (Canada) Sage Stefani (2nd)
- January 16 – 19: NAC #2 in (Canada) Nakiska
  - Men's winners: (Canada) Reece Howden (2 times)
  - Women's winners: (Canada) Brittany Phelan (2 times)

== Nordic combined ==
=== 2021–22 FIS Nordic Combined World Cup ===
- November 25–28, 2021: WC #1 in (Finland) Ruka
  - Men's winners: (Norway) Jarl Magnus Riiber (2 times) / (Germany) Terence Weber
- December 3 – 5, 2021: WC #2 in Lillehammer
  - Men's winner: (Norway) Jarl Magnus Riiber
  - Women's winner: (Norway) Gyda Westvold Hansen (2 times)
  - Men's Team Relay winners: Norway (Espen Bjørnstad, Jens Lurås Oftebro, Jørgen Graabak, Jarl Magnus Riiber)
- December 10 – 12, 2021: WC #3 in (Estonia) Otepää
  - Men's winner: (Norway) Jarl Magnus Riiber (2 times)
  - Women's winner: (Norway) Gyda Westvold Hansen (2 times)
- December 17 – 19, 2021: WC #4 in (Austria) Ramsau
  - Women's winner: (Norway) Gyda Westvold Hansen
  - Men's winner: (Norway) Jarl Magnus Riiber (2 times)
- January 7 – 9: WC #5 in (Italy) Val di Fiemme
  - Mixed Team Relay winners: Norway (Jens Lurås Oftebro, Mari Leinan Lund, Gyda Westvold Hansen, Jørgen Graabak)
  - Men's winners: (Austria) Johannes Lamparter (1st) / (Germany) Vinzenz Geiger (2nd)
  - Women's winner: (Norway) Gyda Westvold Hansen
- January 14 – 16: WC #6 in (Germany) Klingenthal
  - Men's winner: (Austria) Johannes Lamparter (2 times)
- January 21 – 23: WC #7 in (Slovenia) Planica
  - Cancelled.
- January 27 – 30: WC #8 in (Austria) Seefeld
  - Men's winners: (Norway) Jarl Magnus Riiber (1st) / (Germany) Vinzenz Geiger (2nd) / (Norway) Jørgen Graabak (3rd)
- February 25 – 27: WC #9 in (Finland) Lahti
  - Men's Sprint Relay winners: (Norway) Jens Lurås Oftebro & Jørgen Graabak
  - Men's winner: (Norway) Jarl Magnus Riiber
- March 4 – 6: WC #10 in (Norway) Oslo
  - Men's winner: (Norway) Jarl Magnus Riiber (2 times)
- March 11 – 13: WC #11 in (Germany) Schonach
  - Women's winners: (Japan) Anju Nakamura / (Norway) Gyda Westvold Hansen (2nd)
  - Men's winner: (Norway) Jarl Magnus Riiber (2 times)
- World Cup winners: (Norway) Jarl Magnus Riiber (m) / (Norway) Gyda Westvold Hansen (f)

=== 2021–22 FIS Nordic Combined Continental Cup ===
- November 25–27, 2021: CC #1 in (Russia) Nizhny Tagil
  - Winner: (Germany) Jakob Lange (2 times)
- December 4 & 5, 2021: CC #2 in (China) Zhangjiakou
  - Winner: (Germany) Jakob Lange (2 times)
- December 18 & 19, 2021: CC #3 in (Finland) Ruka
  - Winners: (Norway) Andreas Skoglund (1st) / (Norway) Einar Lurås Oftebro (2nd)
- January 7 – 9: CC #4 in (Germany) Klingenthal
  - Cancelled.
- January 21 – 23: CC #5 in (Germany) Klingenthal
  - Winner: (Norway) Simen Tiller (3 times)

=== 2021–2022 FIS Nordic combined Alpen Cup ===
Summer

- August 10, 2021: OPA #1 in (Germany) Klingenthal (Only women's)
  - Winner: (Germany) Trine Göpfert
- August 14, 2021: OPA #2 in (Germany) Bischofsgrün (Only women's)
  - Winner: (Germany) Trine Göpfert
- September 11 & 12, 2021: OPA #3 in (Germany) Oberwiesenthal
  - Men's winner: (Italy) Iacopo Bortolas (2 times)
  - Women's winner: (Slovenia) Silva Verbič (2 times)
- September 25 & 26, 2021: OPA #4 in (Austria) Tschagguns
  - Men's winner: (Italy) Iacopo Bortolas (2 times)
  - Women's winner: (Germany) Jenny Nowak (2 times)
- October 2 & 3, 2021: OPA #5 in (Italy) Predazzo
  - Winners: (Germany) Jonathan Gräbert (m) / (Austria) Julia Schmidt (f)
  - Men's Team winners: Germany II (Moritz Terei, Ansgar Schupp, Armin Peter)

Winter

- December 17 – 19, 2021: OPA #6 in (Austria) Seefeld
  - Men's winners: (Germany) Jan Andersen (1st) / (Austria) Severin Reiter (2nd)
  - Women's winners: (Slovenia) Silva Verbič (1st) / (Germany) Jenny Nowak (2nd)
- January 14 – 16: OPA #7 in (Germany) Schonach
  - Men's winners: (Italy) Iacopo Bortolas (1st) / (Czech Republic) Jiří Konvalinka (2nd)
  - Women's winners: (Italy) Annika Sieff (2 times)

== Ski jumping ==
- March 10 – 13: FIS Ski Flying World Championships 2022 in (Norway) Vikersund

=== 2021–22 FIS Ski Jumping World Cup ===
- November 19 – 21, 2021: WC #1 in (Russia) Nizhny Tagil (Only men's)
  - Winners: (Germany) Karl Geiger (1st) / (Norway) Halvor Egner Granerud (2nd)
- November 25 – 27, 2021: WC #2 in (Russia) Nizhny Tagil (Only women's)
  - Winners: (Austria) Marita Kramer (1st) / (Slovenia) Ema Klinec (2nd)
- November 26 – 28, 2021: WC #3 in (Finland) Ruka (Only men's)
  - Winners: (Japan) Ryōyū Kobayashi (1st) / (Slovenia) Anže Lanišek (2nd)
- December 3 – 5, 2021: WC #4 in (Norway) Lillehammer (Only women's)
  - Winners: (Germany) Katharina Althaus (1st) / (Austria) Marita Kramer (2nd)
- December 3 – 5, 2021: WC #5 in (Poland) Wisla (Only men's)
  - Winner: (Austria) Jan Hörl
  - Teams winners: Austria (Manuel Fettner, Jan Hörl, Daniel Huber, Stefan Kraft)
- December 10 – 12, 2021: WC #6 in (Germany) Klingenthal
  - Men's winners: (Austria) Stefan Kraft (1st) / (Japan) Ryōyū Kobayashi (2nd)
  - Women's winner: (Austria) Marita Kramer (2 times)
- December 16 & 17, 2021: WC #7 in (Austria) Ramsau (Only women's)
  - Winner: (Austria) Marita Kramer
- December 17 – 19, 2021: WC #8 in (Switzerland) Engelberg (Only men's)
  - Winners: (Germany) Karl Geiger (1st) / (Japan) Ryōyū Kobayashi (2nd)
- December 29, 2021: WC #9 in (Germany) Oberstdorf (1st round of 2021–22 Four Hills Tournament)
  - Winner: (Japan) Ryōyū Kobayashi
- December 31, 2021: WC #11 in (Slovenia) Ljubno (Only women's) (1st round of 2021–22 Silvester Tournament)
  - Winners (Slovenia) Nika Križnar
- January 1: WC #10 in (Slovenia) Ljubno (Only women's) (2nd round of 2021–22 Silvester Tournament)
  - Winner: (Japan) Sara Takanashi
- January 1: WC #12 in (Germany) Garmisch-Partenkirchen (2nd round of 2021–22 Four Hills Tournament)
  - Winner: (Japan) Ryōyū Kobayashi
- January 5 & 6: WC #13 in (Austria) Bischofshofen (3rd and 4th round of 2021–22 Four Hills Tournament)
  - Winners: (Japan) Ryōyū Kobayashi (1st) / (Austria) Daniel Huber (2nd)
  - 2021–22 Four Hills Tournament winner: (Japan) Ryōyū Kobayashi
- January 7 – 9: WC #14 in (Japan) Sapporo (Only women's)
  - Cancelled due to the COVID-19 pandemic.
- January 8 & 9: WC #15 in Bischofshofen (Only men's)
  - Winner: (Norway) Marius Lindvik
  - Teams winners: Austria (Manuel Fettner, Jan Hörl, Philipp Aschenwald, Daniel Huber)
- January 13 – 15: WC #16 in (Japan) Zaō (Only women's)
  - Cancelled due to the COVID-19 pandemic.
- January 14 – 16: WC #17 in (Poland) Zakopane (Only men's)
  - Winner: (Norway) Marius Lindvik
  - Teams winners: Slovenia (Lovro Kos, Peter Prevc, Timi Zajc, Anže Lanišek)
- January 20 – 23: WC #18 in (Japan) Sapporo (Only men's)
  - Cancelled due to the COVID-19 pandemic.
- January 21 – 23: WC #19 in (Germany) Titisee-Neustadt (Only men's)
  - Winner: (Germany) Karl Geiger (2 times)
- January 28 – 30: WC #20 in (Germany) Willingen
  - Mixed teams winners: Slovenia (Ema Klinec, Cene Prevc, Urša Bogataj, Anže Lanišek)
  - Men's winners: (Japan) Ryōyū Kobayashi (1st) / (Norway) Marius Lindvik (2nd)
  - Women's winners: (Austria) Marita Kramer (1st) / (Slovenia) Nika Križnar (2nd)
- February 25 – 27: WC #21 in (Finland) Lahti (Only men's)
  - Winners: (Austria) Stefan Kraft (1st) / (Japan) Ryōyū Kobayashi & (Norway) Halvor Egner Granerud (2nd, same points)
  - Teams winners: Austria (Jan Hörl, Clemens Aigner, Ulrich Wohlgenannt, Stefan Kraft)
- March 2 & 3: WC #22 in (Norway) Lillehammer
  - Men's winner: (Austria) Stefan Kraft
  - Women's winners: (Japan) Sara Takanashi (1st) / (Austria) Marita Kramer (2nd)
- March 5 & 6: WC #23 in (Norway) Oslo
  - Men's winners: (Norway) Marius Lindvik (1st) / (Norway) Daniel-André Tande (2nd)
  - Women's winners: (Norway) Silje Opseth (1st) / (Japan) Sara Takanashi (2nd)
- March 11 – 13: WC #24 in (Germany) Oberhof (Only women's)
  - Winner: (Slovenia) Urša Bogataj (2 times)
- March 18 – 20: WC #25 in (Germany) Oberstdorf (Only men's)
  - Winners: (Austria) Stefan Kraft (1st) / (Slovenia) Timi Zajc (2nd)
- March 24 – 27: WC #26 in Planica (Only men's)
  - Winner: (Slovenia) Žiga Jelar (1st) / (Norway) Marius Lindvik (2nd)
  - Teams winners: Slovenia (Žiga Jelar, Peter Prevc, Timi Zajc, Anže Lanišek)
- World Cup winners: (Japan) Ryōyū Kobayashi (m) / (Austria) Marita Kramer (f)

=== 2021–22 FIS Ski Jumping Continental Cup ===
Summer

- July 17 & 18, 2021: COC #1 in (Finland) Kuopio (The competition organized by Chinese Ski Association at the Finnish hill.)
  - Men's winners: (Germany) David Siegel (1st) / (Finland) Eetu Nousiainen (2nd)
  - Women's winners: (China) Birun Shao (1st) / (Russia) Maria Yakovleva (2nd)
- August 13 & 14, 2021: COC #2 in (Czech Republic) Frenštát (Only men's)
  - Winners: (Czech Republic) Viktor Polášek (1st) / (Austria) Mika Schwann (2nd)
- August 21 & 22, 2021: COC #3 in (Romania) Râșnov
  - Men's winners: (Austria) Manuel Fettner (1st) / (Austria) Mika Schwann (2nd)
  - Women's winner: (Slovenia) Jerneja Brecl (2 times)
- September 11 & 12, 2021: COC #4 in (Austria) Bischofshofen (Only men's)
  - Men's winners: (Austria) Manuel Fettner (1st) / (Austria) Daniel Tschofenig (2nd)
- September 18 & 19, 2021: COC #5 in (Norway) Oslo
  - Men's winners: (Norway) Andreas Granerud Buskum (1st) / (Norway) Fredrik Villumstad (2nd)
  - Women's winner: (Germany) Katharina Althaus (2 times)
- September 25 & 26, 2021: COC #6 in (Germany) Klingenthal (Only men's)
  - Men's winners: (Austria) Timon Pascal Kahofer (1st) / (Austria) Manuel Fettner (2nd)

Winter

- December 4 & 5, 2021: COC #1 in (China) Zhangjiakou
  - Men's winners: (Germany) David Siegel (1st) / (Austria) Ulrich Wohlgenannt (2nd)
  - Women's winners: (Russia) Maria Yakovleva (1st) / (Russia) Diana Toropchenova (2nd)
- December 10 – 12, 2021: COC #2 in (Norway) Vikersundbakken
  - Men's winners: (Austria) Ulrich Wohlgenannt (1st) / (Germany) Severin Freund (2nd)
  - Women's winners: (Slovenia) Jerneja Repinc Zupančič (1st) / (Austria) Sophie Sorschag (2nd)
- December 17 & 18, 2021: COC #3 in (Norway) Notodden (Women's only)
  - Winner: (Austria) Sophie Sorschag (2 times)
- December 18 & 19, 2021: COC #4 in (Finland) Ruka (Only men's)
  - Winner: (Norway) Robin Pedersen (2 times)
- December 27 & 28, 2021: COC #5 in (Switzerland) Engelberg (Only men's)
  - Winners: (Norway) Benjamin Østvold (1st) / (Norway) Sondre Ringen (2nd)
- January 7 & 8: COC #6 in (Germany) Titisee-Neustadt
  - Cancelled
- January 14 – 16: COC #7 in (Germany) Oberstdorf (Only men's)
  - Winner: (Austria) Ulrich Wohlgenannt (2 times)
- January 15 & 16: COC #8 in (Japan) Okurayama (Only men's)
  - Cancelled
- January 21 – 23: COC #9 in (Austria) Innsbruck
  - Men's winner: (Slovenia) Anže Semenič (2 times)
  - Women's winner: (Japan) Sara Takanashi (2 times)

=== 2021 FIS Ski Jumping Grand Prix ===
- July 16–18, 2021: GP #1 in (Poland) Wisła
  - Men's winners: (Poland) Jakub Wolny (1st) / (Poland) Dawid Kubacki (2nd)
  - Women's winner: (Slovenia) Urša Bogataj (2 times)
- August 5–7, 2021: GP #2 in (France) Courchevel
  - Winners: (Austria) Stefan Kraft (m) / (Slovenia) Urša Bogataj (f)
- August 15 & 15, 2021: GP #3 in (Czech Republic) Frenštát (Only women's)
  - Winner: (Japan) Sara Takanashi
- September 3–5, 2021: GP #4 in (Kazakhstan) Shchuchinsk (Only men's)
  - Men's winner: (Norway) Halvor Egner Granerud (2 times)
- September 10–12, 2021: GP #5 in (Russia) Chaykovsky
  - Men's winner: (Norway) Halvor Egner Granerud
  - Women's winners: (Slovenia) Urša Bogataj (1st) / (Russia) Irina Avvakumova (2nd)
  - Mixed Team winners: Norway (Anna Odine Strøm, Johann André Forfang, Silje Opseth, Halvor Egner Granerud)
- September 17–19, 2021: GP #6 in (Romania) Râșnov
  - Cancelled.
- September 24 & 25, 2021: GP #7 in (Austria) Hinzenbach (Only men's)
  - Winner: (Japan) Yukiya Satō
- October 1 & 2, 2021: GP #8 in (Germany) Klingenthal
  - Winners: (Japan) Ryoyu Kobayashi (m) / (Austria) Marita Kramer (f)

=== 2021–2022 FIS Cup ===
Summer

- July 3 & 4, 2021: FC #1 in (Estonia) Otepää
  - Men's winner: (Austria) Mika Schwann (2 times)
  - Women's winner: (Russia) Maria Yakovleva (2 times)
- July 15 & 16, 2021: FC #2 in (Finland) Kuopio (The competition organized by Chinese Ski Association at the Finnish hill.)
  - Men's winners: (Austria) Thomas Lackner (1st) / (Finland) Eetu Nousiainen (2nd)
  - Women's winners: (China) Birun Shao (1st) / (Austria) Hannah Wiegele (2nd)
- August 25, 2021: FC #3 in (France) Prémanon–Les Tuffes (Only women's)
  - Cancelled.
- August 26 & 27, 2021: FC #4 in (France) Gérardmer (Only women's)
  - Winners: (France) Joséphine Pagnier (1st) / (France) Julia Clair (2nd)
- August 28 & 29, 2021: FC #5 in (Switzerland) Einsiedeln
  - Men's winners: (Austria) Thomas Diethart (1st) / (Austria) Clemens Aigner (2nd)
  - Women's winner: (Switzerland) Sina Arnet (2 times)
- September 4 & 5, 2021: FC #6 in (Slovenia) Ljubno ob Savinji
  - Men's winners: (Austria) Janni Reisenauer (1st) / (Austria) Francisco Mörth (2nd)
  - Women's winners: (Slovenia) Nika Križnar (1st) / (China) Qingyue Peng (2nd)
- September 18 & 19, 2021: FC #7 in (Austria) Villach
  - Men's winner: (Austria) Janni Reisenauer (2 times)
  - Women's winners: (Slovenia) Nika Prevc (1st) / (Italy) Lara Malsiner (2nd)
- September 25 & 26, 2021: FC #8 in (South Korea) Pyeongchang
  - Cancelled.
  - September 25 & 26, 2021: FC #9 in (Finland) Lahti (The competition organized by Chinese Ski Association at the Finnish hill.) (Only men's)
  - Men's winner: (Austria) Andre Fussenegger (2 times)

Winter

- November 13 & 14, 2021: FC #10 in (Sweden) Falun
  - Men's winners: (Austria) Peter Resinger (1st) / (Austria) Maximilian Ortner (2nd)
  - Women's winner: (Russia) Irina Avvakumova (2 times)
- December 10–12, 2021: FC #11 in (Switzerland) Kandersteg
  - Men's winners: (Austria) Francisco Mörth (1st) / (Austria) Elias Medwed (2nd)
  - Women's winner: (France) Emma Chervet (2 times)
- December 17 & 18, 2021: FC #12 in (Norway) Notodden (Only men's)
  - Winner: (Austria) Clemens Aigner (2 times)
- January 8 & 9: FC #13 in (Poland) Zakopane (Only men's)
  - Cancelled.

=== 2021–2022 FIS Ski Jumping Alpen Cup ===
Summer

- August 9 & 10, 2021: OPA #1 in (Germany) Klingenthal (Only women's)
  - Winners: (Switzerland) Emely Torazza (1st) / (Germany) Anna-Fay Scharfenberg (2nd)
- August 12, 2021: OPA #2 in (Germany) Pöhla (Only women's)
  - Winner: (Switzerland) Emely Torazza
- August 14 & 15, 2021: OPA #3 in (Germany) Bischofsgrün (Only women's)
  - Winner: (Slovenia) Nika Prevc (2 times)
- September 11 & 12, 2021: OPA #4 in (Czech Republic) Liberec
  - Men's winner: (Austria) Maximilian Ortner (2 times)
  - Women's winners: (Slovenia) Nika Prevc (1st) / (Slovenia) Jerneja Repinc Zupančič (2nd)
- September 24–26, 2021: OPA #5 in (Switzerland) Kandersteg
  - Men's winner: (Austria) Maximilian Ortner (2 times)
  - Women's winners: (Slovenia) Nika Prevc (1st) / (Slovenia) Jerneja Repinc Zupančič (2nd)
- October 2 & 3, 2021: OPA #6 in (Italy) Predazzo
  - Winners: (Germany) Janne Holz (m) / (Slovenia) Tina Erzar (f)

Winter

- December 17 & 18, 2021: OPA #7 in (Austria) Seefeld
  - Men's winners: (Slovenia) Mark Hafnar (1st) / (Slovenia) Maksim Bartolj (2nd)
  - Women's winners: (Slovenia) Nika Prevc (1st) / (Slovenia) Taja Bodlaj (2nd)
- January 14 – 16: OPA #8 in (Germany) Oberhof
  - Men's winners: (Austria) Markus Müller (1st) / (2nd)
  - Women's winners: (Slovenia) Nika Prevc (2 times)

== Ski mountaineering ==
=== 2021–22 ISMF World Cup Ski Mountaineering ===
- December 16 – 19, 2021: WC #1 in (Italy) Pontedilegno-Tonale
  - Sprint winners: (Switzerland) Arno Lietha (m) / (France) Emily Harrop (f)
  - Vertical winners: (Switzerland) Rémi Bonnet (m) / (France) Axelle Gachet Mollaret (f)
  - Individual winners: (France) Xavier Gachet (m) / (France) Axelle Gachet Mollaret (f)
- January 15 & 16: WC #2 in (Andorra) Comapedrosa
  - Individual winners: (Italy) Michele Boscacci (m) / (France) Axelle Gachet Mollaret (f)
  - Vertical winners: (Switzerland) Rémi Bonnet (m) / (Sweden) Tove Alexandersson (f)
- January 27 – 29: WC #3 in (Switzerland) Morgins
  - Sprint winners: (Spain) Oriol Cardona Coll (m) / (Slovakia) Marianna Jagerčíková (f)
  - Individual winners: (France) Xavier Gachet (m) / (France) Axelle Gachet Mollaret (f)
- February 3 – 5: WC #4 in (Italy) Caspoggio
  - Individual winners: (France) Xavier Gachet (m) / (France) Axelle Gachet Mollaret (f)
  - Sprint winners: (Spain) Oriol Cardona Coll (m) / (France) Emily Harrop (f)
- March 18 – 20: WC #5 in (Italy) Val Martello
  - Individual winners: (Italy) Davide Magnini (m) / (France) Axelle Gachet Mollaret (f)
  - Sprint winners: (Spain) Oriol Cardona Coll (m) / (France) Emily Harrop (f)
- April 6 – 9: WC #6 in (France) Flaine
  - Individual winners: (Switzerland) Rémi Bonnet (m) / (France) Axelle Gachet Mollaret (f)
  - Vertical winners: (Switzerland) Rémi Bonnet (m) / (Sweden) Tove Alexandersson (f)
  - Sprint winners: (Switzerland) Arno Lietha (m) / (France) Emily Harrop (f)

== Snowboarding ==
=== 2021–22 FIS Snowboard World Cup ===
Big Air

- October 23, 2021: WC #1 in (Switzerland) Chur
  - Winners: (Switzerland) Jonas Boesiger (m) / (Japan) Kokomo Murase (f)
- December 2 – 4, 2021: WC #2 in (United States) Steamboat
  - Winners: (China) Su Yiming (m) / (Japan) Reira Iwabuchi (f)
- World Cup winners: (Switzerland) Jonas Boesiger (m) / (Austria) Anna Gasser (f)

Halfpipe

- December 9 – 11, 2021: WC #1 in (United States) Copper Mountain
  - Winners: (Japan) Ruka Hirano (m) / (China) Cai Xuetong (f)
- January 6 – 8: WC #2 in (United States) Mammoth Mountain
  - Winners: (Japan) Ayumu Hirano (m) / (Japan) Ruki Tomita (f)
- January 13 – 15: WC #3 in (Switzerland) Laax
  - Winners: (Japan) Ayumu Hirano (m) / (United States) Chloe Kim (f)
- World Cup winners: (Japan) Ayumu Hirano (m) / (China) Cai Xuetong (f)

Parallel

- December 11 – 12, 2021: WC #1 in (Russia) Lake Bannoye
  - Parallel giant slalom winners: (South Korea) Lee Sang-ho (m) / (Russia) Sofia Nadyrshina (f)
  - Parallel slalom winners: (Austria) Andreas Prommegger (m) / (Switzerland) Julie Zogg (f)
- December 16, 2021: WC #2 in (Italy) Carezza
  - Parallel giant slalom winners: (Germany) Stefan Baumeister (m) / (Austria) Daniela Ulbing (f)
- December 18, 2021: WC #3 in (Italy) Cortina d'Ampezzo
  - Parallel giant slalom winners: (Switzerland) Dario Caviezel (m) / (Czech Republic) Ester Ledecká (f)
- January 8: WC #4 in (Switzerland) Scuol
  - Parallel giant slalom winners: (Russia) Dmitry Loginov (m) / (Austria) Sabine Schöffmann (f)
- January 11 & 12: WC #5 in Bad Gastein
  - Parallel slalom winners: (Austria) Arvid Auner (m) / (Austria) Daniela Ulbing (f)
  - Mixed team parallel slalom winners: Austria IV (Arvid Auner & Julia Dujmovits)
- January 14 & 15: WC #6 in Simonhöhe
  - Parallel giant slalom winners: (Germany) Stefan Baumeister (m) / (Poland) Aleksandra Król (f)
  - Mixed team parallel giant slalom winners: Austria III (Alexander Payer & Sabine Schöffmann)
- March 12 & 13: WC #7 in (Italy) Piancavallo
  - Parallel slalom winners: (Italy) Marc Hofer (m) / (Japan) Tsubaki Miki & (Switzerland) Julie Zogg (f, same time)
  - Mixed team parallel slalom winners: Austria II (Benjamin Karl & Daniela Ulbing)
- March 16: WC #8 in (Slovenia) Rogla
  - Parallel giant slalom winners: (Italy) Edwin Coratti (m) / (Germany) Ramona Theresia Hofmeister (f)
- March 19 & 20: WC #9 in Berchtesgaden
  - Parallel slalom winners: (Italy) Edwin Coratti & (Austria) Andreas Prommegger (m, same time) / (Switzerland) Julie Zogg (f)
  - Mixed team parallel slalom winners: Germany IX (Stefan Baumeister & Ramona Theresia Hofmeister)
- World Cup winners: (South Korea) Lee Sang-ho (m) / (Germany) Ramona Theresia Hofmeister (f)

Slopestyle

- December 29, 2021 – January 2: WC #1 in (Canada) Calgary
  - Winners: (Canada) Sébastien Toutant (m) / (Japan) Kokomo Murase (f)
- January 6 – 8: WC #2 in (United States) Mammoth Mountain
  - Winners: (United States) Red Gerard (m) / (United States) Jamie Anderson (f)
- January 13 – 15: WC #3 in (Switzerland) Laax
  - Winners: (United States) Sean Fitzsimons (m) / (Australia) Tess Coady (f)
- March 3 – 6: WC #4 in (Georgia (country)) Bakuriani
  - Winners: (Germany) Leon Vockensperger (m) / (Canada) Laurie Blouin (f)
- March 18 – 19: WC #5 in (Czech Republic) Špindlerův Mlýn
  - Winners: (New Zealand) Tiarn Collins (m) / (Japan) Kokomo Murase (f)
- March 25 – 27: WC #6 in (Switzerland) Laax
  - Winners: (Norway) Marcus Kleveland (m) / (Austria) Anna Gasser (f)
- World Cup winners: (New Zealand) Tiarn Collins (m) / (Japan) Kokomo Murase (f)

Snowboard Cross

- November 26 – 28, 2021: WC #1 in (China) Secret Garden
  - Winners: (Austria) Alessandro Hämmerle (m) / (Czech Republic) Eva Samková (f)
- December 9 – 11, 2021: WC #2 in (Austria) Montafon
  - Winners: (Austria) Alessandro Hämmerle (m) / (United Kingdom) Charlotte Bankes (f)
  - Teams winner: Italy (Lorenzo Sommariva & Michela Moioli)
- December 17 & 18, 2021: WC #3 in (Italy) Cervinia
  - Winners: (Austria) Jakob Dusek (m) / (Italy) Michela Moioli (f)
- January 7 – 9: WC #4 in (Russia) Krasnoyarsk
  - Men's winner: (Germany) Martin Nörl (2 times)
  - Women's winner: (United Kingdom) Charlotte Bankes (2 times)
- January 21 & 22: WC #5 in (Italy) Chiesa in Valmalenco
  - Cancelled.
- January 28 & 29: WC #6 in (Italy) Cortina d'Ampezzo
  - Winners: (Germany) Martin Nörl (m) / (Italy) Michela Moioli (f)
- March 10 – 12: WC #7 in (Austria) Reiteralm
  - Winners: (Italy) Lorenzo Sommariva (m) / (United Kingdom) Charlotte Bankes (f)
- March 20: WC #8 in (Switzerland) Veysonnaz
  - Winners: (Canada) Éliot Grondin (m) / (United Kingdom) Charlotte Bankes (f)
- World Cup winners: (Germany) Martin Nörl (m) / (United Kingdom) Charlotte Bankes (f)

=== 2021–22 FIS Snowboard Europa Cup ===
Big Air

- January 4 & 5: EC #1 in (France) Les Arcs
  - Cancelled.
- January 13: EC #2 in (France) Vars
  - Cancelled.

Snowboard Cross

- November 24 & 25, 2021: EC #1 in (Austria) Pitztal
  - Cancelled.
- January 8 & 9: EC #2 in (France) Puy-Saint-Vincent
  - Cancelled.
- January 22 & 23: EC #3 in (Austria) Reiteralm
  - Here, 1st competition is cancelled.
  - Winners: (Spain) Álvaro Romero Villanueva (m) / (Switzerland) Aline Albrecht (f)

Parallel

- December 11 & 12, 2021: EC #1 in (Germany) Bischofswiesen
  - Men's Parallel slalom winner: (Italy) Marc Hofer (2 times)
  - Women's Parallel slalom winners: (Switzerland) Xenia Spörri (1st) / (Russia) Darina Klink (2nd)
- December 18 & 19, 2021: EC #2 in (Czech Republic) Monínec
  - Men's Parallel slalom winners: (Switzerland) Sebastian Schüler (1st) / (Austria) Dominik Burgstaller (2nd)
  - Women's Parallel slalom winners: (Russia) Olga Naidiakina (1st) / (Poland) Weronika Dawidek (2nd)
- January 22 & 23: EC #3 in (Ukraine) Bukovel
  - Men's Parallel giant slalom winners: (Austria) Matthäus Pink (1st) / (Austria) Dominik Burgstaller (2nd)
  - Women's Parallel giant slalom winners: (Ukraine) Annamari Dancha (1st) / (Italy) Elisa Caffont (2nd)

Slopestyle

- November 19, 2021: EC #1 in (Netherlands) Landgraaf
  - Winners: (Germany) Leon Gütl (m) / (United Kingdom) Mia Brookes (f)
- January 13: EC #2 in (France) Vars
  - Cancelled.
- January 22 & 23: EC #3 in (Italy) Prato Nevoso
  - Winners: (Italy) Emil Zulian (m) / (Finland) Telma Särkipaju (f)

=== 2022 FIS Snowboard North American Cup ===
Parallel

- January 21 & 22: NAC #1 in (United States) Giants Ridge
  - Parallel giant slalom winners: (United States) Ryan Rosencranz (m) / (United States) Iris Pflum (f)
  - Parallel slalom winners: (United States) Dylan Udolf (m) / (United States) Alexa Bullis (f)

Slopestyle

- January 19 – 21: NAC #1 in (Canada) Sun Peaks
  - Men's winners: (Canada) Lane Weaver (1st) / (United States) Jaxson Moon (2nd)
  - Women's winners: (United States) Danielle Weiler (2 times)

Snowboard Cross

- January 11 – 13: NAC #1 in (Canada) Sunshine Village
  - Men's winners: (Canada) Tristan Bell (2 times)
  - Women's winners: (United States) Acy Craig (1st) / (Canada) Brenna O'Brien (2nd)

== Telemark skiing ==
- March 9 – 11: 2022 FIS Telemark skiing Junior World Championships in (Switzerland) Mürren

=== 2022 Telemark skiing World Cup ===
- January 14 & 15: WC #1 in (France) Samoëns
  - Cancelled.
- January 21 & 22: WC #2 in (France) Pralognan-la-Vanoise
  - Cancelled.
- January 24 & 25: WC #3 in (France) Saint-Gervais-les-Bains
  - Sprint winners: (Norway) Trym Nygaard Løken (m) / (France) Laly Chaucheprat (f)
  - Classic winners: (Switzerland) Bastien Dayer (m) / (Switzerland) Martina Wyss (f)
- January 27 – 30: WC #4 in (Switzerland) Melchsee-Frutt
  - Sprint winners: (Switzerland) Bastien Dayer (m) / (Switzerland) Martina Wyss (f)
  - Classic winners: (Switzerland) Bastien Dayer (m) / (Switzerland) Martina Wyss (f)
  - Men's Parallel Sprint winner: (Norway) Trym Nygaard Løken (2 times)
  - Women's Parallel Sprint winners: (Switzerland) Martina Wyss (1st) / (France) Argeline Tan-Bouquet (2nd)
- February 2 & 3: WC #5 in (Switzerland) Villars-sur-Ollon
  - Cancelled.
- February 17 – 19: WC #6 in (Norway) Ål
  - Classic winners: (Switzerland) Bastien Dayer (m) / (Switzerland) Martina Wyss (f)
  - Sprint winners: (Switzerland) Bastien Dayer (m) / (Switzerland) Martina Wyss (f)
  - Parallel Sprint winners: (Switzerland) Bastien Dayer (m) / (Switzerland) Martina Wyss (f)
- March 6 & 7: WC #7 in (France) Les Houches
  - Men's Sprint winners: (France) Élie Nabot (1st) / (Switzerland) Bastien Dayer (2nd)
  - Women's Sprint winners: (United Kingdom) Jasmin Taylor (1st) / (Switzerland) Martina Wyss (2nd)
- March 9 – 11: WC #7 in (Switzerland) Mürren
  - Classic winners: (Switzerland) Bastien Dayer (m) / (Switzerland) Martina Wyss (f)
  - Sprint winners: (Norway) Jacob Alveberg (m) / (Switzerland) Martina Wyss (f)
  - Parallel Sprint winners: (Switzerland) Bastien Dayer (m) / (United Kingdom) Jasmin Taylor (f)
- March 18 – 20: WC #8 in (Slovenia) Krvavec (final)
  - Classic winners: (France) Théo Sillon (m) / (Switzerland) Martina Wyss (f)
  - Sprint winners: (Switzerland) Bastien Dayer (m) / (Switzerland) Martina Wyss (f)
  - Parallel Sprint winners: (Switzerland) Bastien Dayer (m) / (Germany) Johanna Holzmann (f)
