= 2021–22 FIS Alpine Ski Europa Cup =

Alpine skiing competition

Discipline	Men	Women
Overall	(Italy) Giovanni Franzoni	(Austria) Franziska Gritsch
Downhill	(Switzerland) Ralph Weber	(Switzerland) Juliana Suter
Super-G	(Italy) Giovanni Franzoni	(Austria) Christina Ager
Giant slalom	(Andorra) Joan Verdú	(Switzerland) Simone Wild
Slalom	(Norway) Alexander Steen Olsen	(Switzerland) Aline Danioth

Competition
Locations	14	16
Individual	32	31
Cancelled	3	7
Rescheduled	1	6

The 2021–22 FIS Alpine Ski Europa Cup was the fiftieth consecutive Europa Cup season, the second international level competition in alpine skiing.

On 1 March 2022, following the 2022 Russian invasion of Ukraine, FIS decided to exclude athletes from Russia and Belarus from FIS competitions, with an immediate effect.

== Men ==
=== Calendar ===
Event key: DH – Downhill, SL – Slalom, GS – Giant slalom, SG – Super giant slalom
Stage	Date	Venue	Type	Winner	Second	Third	Overall leader	Details
1	29 November 2021	(Switzerland) Zinal	SG	(Italy) Matteo Franzoso	(Austria) Lukas Feurstein	(Norway) Markus Nordgård Fossland	(Italy) Matteo Franzoso	
2	30 November 2021	(Switzerland) Zinal	SG	(Italy) Giovanni Franzoni	(France) Cyprien Sarrazin	(France) Florian Loriot	(Italy) Matteo Franzoso	
3	2 December 2021	(Switzerland) Zinal	GS	(United States) Brian McLaughlin	(Netherlands) Maarten Meiners	(Austria) Lukas Feurstein	(Austria) Lukas Feurstein	
4	3 December 2021	(Switzerland) Zinal	GS	(Switzerland) Cédric Noger	(Belgium) Sam Maes (Italy) Giovanni Franzoni	–	(Italy) Giovanni Franzoni	
5	11 December 2021	(Italy) Santa Caterina	DH	(Switzerland) Yannick Chabloz	(Liechtenstein) Marco Pfiffner	(Switzerland) Ralph Weber	(Italy) Giovanni Franzoni	
6	12 December 2021	(Italy) Santa Caterina	DH	(Switzerland) Josua Mettler	(Liechtenstein) Marco Pfiffner	(Switzerland) Ralph Weber	(Italy) Giovanni Franzoni	
7	13 December 2021	(Italy) Santa Caterina	SG	(Switzerland) Ralph Weber	(Italy) Giovanni Franzoni	(Austria) Christoph Krenn	(Italy) Giovanni Franzoni	
8	15 December 2021	(Italy) Obereggen	SL	(Norway) Alexander Steen Olsen	(Germany) Anton Tremmel	(Bulgaria) Albert Popov (France) Victor Muffat-Jeandet	(Italy) Giovanni Franzoni	
9	16 December 2021	(Italy) Val di Fassa	SL	(France) Clément Noël	(Norway) Alexander Steen Olsen	(United States) Jett Seymour	(Italy) Giovanni Franzoni	
10	19 December 2021	(Austria) Glungezer	GS	(Andorra) Joan Verdú Sánchez	(Finland) Samu Torsti	(Czech Republic) Kryštof Krýzl	(Italy) Giovanni Franzoni	
11	20 December 2021	(Austria) Glungezer	GS	(Andorra) Joan Verdú Sánchez	(Finland) Samu Torsti	(France) Thomas Lardon	(Italy) Giovanni Franzoni	
12	6 January 2022	(Germany) Berchtesgaden	SL	(Austria) Joshua Sturm	(United Kingdom) Billy Major	(Switzerland) Noel von Grünigen	(Italy) Giovanni Franzoni	
13	7 January 2022	(Germany) Berchtesgaden	SL	(United Kingdom) Billy Major	(Germany) Fabian Himmelsbach	(Switzerland) Joel Lütolf	(Italy) Giovanni Franzoni	
14	13 January 2022	(Italy) Tarvisio	DH	(Switzerland) Lars Rösti	(Austria) Christoph Krenn	(Switzerland) Ralph Weber	(Switzerland) Ralph Weber	
15	14 January 2022	(Italy) Tarvisio	DH	(Switzerland) Lars Rösti	(Italy) Nicolò Molteni	(Spain) Adur Etxezarreta	(Switzerland) Ralph Weber	
16	20 January 2022	(France) Vaujany	SL	(Germany) Fabian Himmelsbach	(France) Paco Rassat	(Spain) Joaquim Salarich	(Switzerland) Ralph Weber	
17	21 January 2022	(France) Vaujany	SL	(Switzerland) Fadri Janutin	(France) Paco Rassat	(Switzerland) Reto Mächler	(Switzerland) Ralph Weber	
18	25 January 2022	(Austria) Saalbach-Hinterglemm	DH	(Canada) James Crawford	(Switzerland) Yannick Chabloz	(Canada) Jeffrey Read	(Switzerland) Ralph Weber	
19	26 January 2022	(Austria) Saalbach-Hinterglemm	DH	(Canada) Jeffrey Read	(Switzerland) Urs Kryenbühl	(Canada) Cameron Alexander	(Switzerland) Ralph Weber	
20	27 January 2022	(Austria) Saalbach-Hinterglemm	SG	(Italy) Giovanni Franzoni	(Italy) Nicolò Molteni	(Austria) Julian Schütter	(Italy) Giovanni Franzoni	
	2 February 2022	(Germany) Garmisch-Partenkirchen	GS	cancelled, moved to Kvitfjell, Norway			(Italy) Giovanni Franzoni	
	3 February 2022	(Austria) Reiteralm	GS	cancelled			(Italy) Giovanni Franzoni	
21	4 February 2022	(Austria) Reiteralm	GS	(Andorra) Joan Verdú Sánchez	(France) Loévan Parand	(France) Thomas Lardon	(Italy) Giovanni Franzoni	
22	9 February 2022	(Norway) Kvitfjell	DH	(Switzerland) Ralph Weber	(Sweden) Olle Sundin	(Italy) Guglielmo Bosca	(Switzerland) Ralph Weber	
23	10 February 2022	(Norway) Kvitfjell	DH	(Canada) Cameron Alexander	(Switzerland) Josua Mettler	(Canada) Jeffrey Read	(Switzerland) Ralph Weber	
24	11 February 2022	(Norway) Kvitfjell	SG	(Austria) Stefan Babinsky	(Canada) Cameron Alexander	(Austria) Daniel Danklmaier	(Switzerland) Ralph Weber	
25	14 February 2022	(Norway) Oppdal	SG	(Norway) Markus Nordgård Fossland	(Austria) Daniel Danklmaier	(Austria) Stefan Babinsky	(Italy) Giovanni Franzoni	
26	15 February 2022	(Norway) Oppdal	SG	(Italy) Giovanni Franzoni	(Austria) Lukas Feurstein	(Austria) Otmar Striedinger	(Italy) Giovanni Franzoni	
27	18 February 2022	(Norway) Oppdal	GS	(Andorra) Joan Verdú Sánchez	(Switzerland) Livio Simonet	(Austria) Patrick Feurstein	(Italy) Giovanni Franzoni	
28	19 February 2022	(Norway) Oppdal	GS	(Switzerland) Fadri Janutin	(Italy) Filippo Della Vite	(Germany) Anton Grammel	(Italy) Giovanni Franzoni	
29	22 February 2022	(Sweden) Almåsa	SL	(Switzerland) Noel von Grünigen	(Switzerland) Fadri Janutin	(Spain) Joaquim Salarich	(Italy) Giovanni Franzoni	
30	23 February 2022	(Sweden) Almåsa	SL	(France) Steven Amiez	(Norway) Alexander Steen Olsen	(Switzerland) Tanguy Nef	(Italy) Giovanni Franzoni	
31	15 March 2022	(Andorra) Soldeu-El Tarter	SL	(Norway) Alexander Steen Olsen	(Spain) Joaquim Salarich	(Austria) Joshua Sturm	(Italy) Giovanni Franzoni	
32	16 March 2022	(Andorra) Soldeu-El Tarter	GS	(Belgium) Sam Maes	(Switzerland) Fadri Janutin	(Andorra) Joan Verdú Sánchez	(Italy) Giovanni Franzoni	
	18 March 2022	(Andorra) Soldeu-El Tarter	SG	cancelled				
	20 March 2022	(Andorra) Soldeu-El Tarter	DH	cancelled				

=== Rankings ===
==== Overall ====
Rank	after all 32 races	Points
1	(Italy) Giovanni Franzoni	709
2	(Switzerland) Fadri Janutin	652
3	(Switzerland) Ralph Weber	555
4	(Austria) Christoph Krenn	535
4	(Switzerland) Josua Mettler	535

==== Downhill ====
Rank	after all 8 races	Points
1	(Switzerland) Ralph Weber	419
2	(Switzerland) Lars Rösti	353
3	(Liechtenstein) Marco Pfiffner	293
4	(Switzerland) Josua Mettler	268
5	(Canada) Cameron Alexander	255

==== Super-G ====
Rank	after all 7 races	Points
1	(Italy) Giovanni Franzoni	453
2	(Austria) Christoph Krenn	292
3	(Austria) Lukas Feurstein	262
4	(Norway) Markus Nordgaard Fossland	257
5	(Austria) Andreas Ploier	232

==== Giant slalom ====
Rank	after all 8 races	Points
1	(Andorra) Joan Verdú	484
2	(Switzerland) Fadri Janutin	324
3	(France) Loevan Parand	253
4	(Italy) Giovanni Franzoni	236
5	(Switzerland) Livio Simonet	206

==== Slalom ====
Rank	after all 9 races	Points
1	(Norway) Alexander Steen Olsen	360
2	(Switzerland) Noel von Grünigen	354
3	(Germany) Fabian Himmelsbach	340
4	(Switzerland) Fadri Janutin	328
5	(France) Paco Rassat	321

== Women ==
=== Calendar ===
Event key: DH – Downhill, SL – Slalom, GS – Giant slalom, SG – Super giant slalom
Stage	Date	Venue	Type	Winner	Second	Third	Overall leader	Details
	25 November 2021	(Sweden) Duved	SL	cancelled, moved to Pass Thurn, Austria				
	26 November 2021	(Sweden) Duved	SL	cancelled, moved to Pass Thurn, Austria				
	29 November 2021	(Norway) Trysil	GS	cancelled, moved to Mayrhofen, Austria				
	30 November 2021	(Norway) Trysil	GS	cancelled, moved to Mayrhofen, Austria				
1	29 November 2021	(Austria) Mayrhofen	GS	(Liechtenstein) Charlotte Lingg	(Austria) Franziska Gritsch	(Switzerland) Lorina Zelger	(Liechtenstein) Charlotte Lingg	
	30 November 2021	(Austria) Mayrhofen	GS	cancelled				
	2 December 2021	(Norway) Kvitfjell	SG	cancelled, moved to Val di Fassa, Italy				
	3 December 2021	(Norway) Kvitfjell	SG	cancelled, moved to St. Anton, Austria				
2	2 December 2021	(Austria) Pass Thurn	SL	(Germany) Emma Aicher	(Switzerland) Elena Stoffel	(Austria) Franziska Gritsch	(Austria) Franziska Gritsch	
3	3 December 2021	(Austria) Pass Thurn	SL	(Germany) Emma Aicher	(Sweden) Elsa Fermbäck	(Germany) Jessica Hilzinger	(Germany) Emma Aicher	
4	9 December 2021	(Switzerland) Zinal	SG	(Austria) Christina Ager	(Sweden) Estelle Alphand	(Austria) Elisabeth Reisinger	(Germany) Emma Aicher	
5	9 December 2021	(Switzerland) Zinal	SG	(Austria) Elisabeth Reisinger	(Switzerland) Jasmina Suter	(Austria) Christina Ager	(Germany) Emma Aicher	
6	11 December 2021	(Italy) Andalo	GS	(Croatia) Zrinka Ljutić	(Switzerland) Camille Rast	(Poland) Magdalena Luczak	(Germany) Emma Aicher	
7	12 December 2021	(Italy) Andalo	GS	(Switzerland) Camille Rast	(Switzerland) Selina Egloff	(Sweden) Hilma Lövblom	(Croatia) Zrinka Ljutić	
8	15 December 2021	(Italy) Skiworld Ahrntal	SL	(Sweden) Elsa Fermbäck	(Croatia) Leona Popović	(Austria) Chiara Mair	(Croatia) Zrinka Ljutić	
9	16 December 2021	(Italy) Skiworld Ahrntal	SL	(Austria) Chiara Mair	(Austria) Katharina Gallhuber	(Sweden) Elsa Fermbäck	(Sweden) Elsa Fermbäck	
10	19 December 2021	(Italy) Val di Fassa	DH	(Austria) Emily Schöpf	(Switzerland) Juliana Suter	(Germany) Katrin Hirtl-Stanggassinger	(Sweden) Elsa Fermbäck	
11	20 December 2021	(Italy) Val di Fassa	DH	(Switzerland) Juliana Suter	(Austria) Christina Ager	(Switzerland) Janine Schmitt	(Austria) Christina Ager	
	21 December 2021	(Italy) Val di Fassa	SG	cancelled			(Austria) Christina Ager	
12	13 January 2022	(France) Orcières-Merlette 1850	DH	(Switzerland) Juliana Suter	(New Zealand) Alice Robinson	(Italy) Monica Zanoner	(Austria) Christina Ager	
13	14 January 2022	(France) Orcières-Merlette 1850	DH	(Switzerland) Juliana Suter	(New Zealand) Alice Robinson	(France) Esther Paslier	(Switzerland) Juliana Suter	
14	15 January 2022	(France) Orcières-Merlette 1850	GS	(France) Coralie Frasse-Sombet	(Austria) Elisa Mörzinger	(Switzerland) Vivianne Härri	(Switzerland) Juliana Suter	
15	16 January 2022	(France) Orcières-Merlette 1850	GS	(Switzerland) Simone Wild	(France) Coralie Frasse-Sombet	(Austria) Nina Astner	(Switzerland) Juliana Suter	
16	19 January 2022	(Switzerland) Meiringen-Hasliberg	SL	(Switzerland) Aline Danioth	(Italy) Vera Tschurtschenthaler	(Switzerland) Selina Egloff	(Switzerland) Juliana Suter	
17	20 January 2022	(Switzerland) Meiringen-Hasliberg	SL	(Switzerland) Aline Danioth	(Finland) Rosa Pohjolainen	(Italy) Lara Della Mea	(Switzerland) Juliana Suter	
18	26 January 2022	(Austria) St. Anton	DH	(France) Esther Paslier	(Switzerland) Juliana Suter	(Switzerland) Livia Rossi	(Switzerland) Juliana Suter	
19	27 January 2022	(Austria) St. Anton	DH	(Italy) Elena Dolmen	(Austria) Magdalena Egger	(Austria) Lena Wechner	(Switzerland) Juliana Suter	
	28 January 2022	(Austria) St. Anton	SG	cancelled			(Switzerland) Juliana Suter	
20	31 January 2022	(Austria) Zell am See	SL	(Switzerland) Aline Danioth	(Austria) Chiara Mair	(Switzerland) Elena Stoffel	(Switzerland) Juliana Suter	
	1 February 2022	(Austria) Zell am See	SL	cancelled			(Switzerland) Juliana Suter	
21	3 February 2022	(Italy) Sarntal	SG	(Austria) Franziska Gritsch	(Switzerland) Juliana Suter	(Austria) Vanessa Nussbaumer	(Switzerland) Juliana Suter	
22	4 February 2022	(Italy) Sarntal	SG	(Austria) Franziska Gritsch	(Austria) Christina Ager	(Italy) Karoline Pichler	(Switzerland) Juliana Suter	
	8 February 2022	(Serbia) Kopaonik	GS	cancelled			(Switzerland) Juliana Suter	
23	9 February 2022	(Serbia) Kopaonik	GS	(Austria) Elisa Mörzinger	(Switzerland) Simone Wild	(Sweden) Jonna Luthmann	(Austria) Franziska Gritsch	
24	12 February 2022	(Slovenia) Maribor	GS	(Austria) Franziska Gritsch	(Slovenia) Neja Dvornik	(Switzerland) Simone Wild	(Austria) Franziska Gritsch	
25	13 February 2022	(Slovenia) Maribor	GS	(Sweden) Lisa Nyberg	(Austria) Elisa Mörzinger	(Switzerland) Vivianne Härri	(Austria) Franziska Gritsch	
26	19 February 2022	(Switzerland) Crans-Montana	DH	(Austria) Franziska Gritsch	(Norway) Inni Holm Wembstad	(Switzerland) Delia Durrer	(Austria) Franziska Gritsch	
27	20 February 2022	(Switzerland) Crans-Montana	DH	(Norway) Inni Holm Wembstad	(Sweden) Jonna Luthmann	(Switzerland) Delia Durrer	(Austria) Franziska Gritsch	
28	24 February 2022	(Germany) Bad Wiessee	SL	(Austria) Franziska Gritsch	(Sweden) Elsa Fermbäck	(Switzerland) Aline Danioth	(Austria) Franziska Gritsch	
29	25 February 2022	(Germany) Bad Wiessee	SL	(Austria) Franziska Gritsch	(Switzerland) Aline Danioth	(Sweden) Elsa Fermbäck	(Austria) Franziska Gritsch	
	16 March 2022	(Andorra) Soldeu-El Tarter	DH	cancelled			(Austria) Franziska Gritsch	
	17 March 2022	(Andorra) Soldeu-El Tarter	SG	cancelled			(Austria) Franziska Gritsch	
30	19 March 2022	(Andorra) Soldeu-El Tarter	GS	(Switzerland) Simone Wild	(Switzerland) Jasmina Suter	(Switzerland) Vivianne Härri	(Austria) Franziska Gritsch	
31	20 March 2022	(Andorra) Soldeu-El Tarter	SL	(Switzerland) Aline Danioth	(Austria) Franziska Gritsch	(Italy) Lara Della Mea	(Austria) Franziska Gritsch	

=== Rankings ===
==== Overall ====
Rank	after all 31 races	Points
1	(Austria) Franziska Gritsch	1.068
2	(Switzerland) Aline Danioth	540
3	(Austria) Christina Ager	540
4	(Switzerland) Juliana Suter	511
5	(Sweden) Elsa Fermbäck	454

==== Downhill ====
Rank	after all 8 races	Points
1	(Switzerland) Juliana Suter	505
2	(Norway) Inni Holm Wembstad	337
3	(Switzerland) Delia Durrer	334
4	(Austria) Emily Schöpf	330
5	(Austria) Christina Ager	295
5	(Austria) Lena Wechner	295

==== Super-G ====
Rank	after all 4 races	Points
1	(Austria) Christina Ager	245
2	(Austria) Elisabeth Reisinger	210
3	(Austria) Franziska Gritsch	200
4	(Switzerland) Jasmina Suter	186
5	(Austria) Vanessa Nussbaumer	162

==== Giant slalom ====
Rank	after all 9 races	Points
1	(Switzerland) Simone Wild	435
2	(Switzerland) Vivianne Härri	375
3	(Austria) Nina Astner	306
4	(Austria) Elisa Mörzinger	305
5	(Austria) Franziska Gritsch	256

==== Slalom ====
Rank	after all 10 races	Points
1	(Switzerland) Aline Danioth	540
2	(Austria) Franziska Gritsch	488
3	(Sweden) Elsa Fermbäck	454
4	(Italy) Lara Della Mea	409
5	(Switzerland) Elena Stoffel	341
