= Vivianne Härri =

Swiss alpine skier

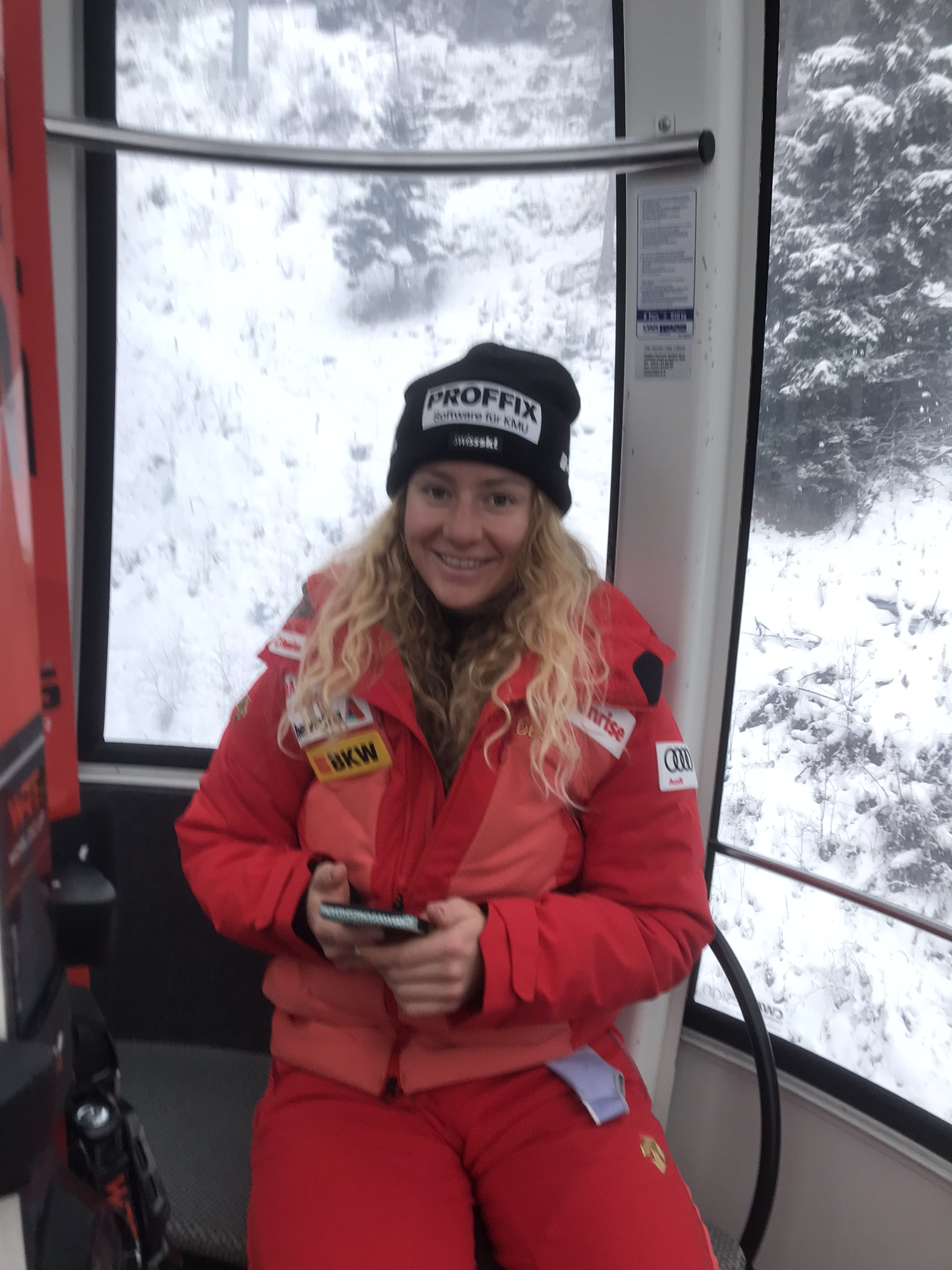
- Härri in 2023

Personal information
- Born: 8 September 1999 (age 26) Giswil, Switzerland
- Height: 1.63 m (5 ft 4 in)

Skiing career
- Sport: Alpine skiing
- Club: SC Giswil-Mörlialp
- Disciplines: Polyvalent
- World Cup debut: 2021

World Cup
- Seasons: 3

Vivianne Härri (born 8 September 1999) is a retired Swiss alpine skier.

== Career ==
During her career she has achieved one result among the top 15 in the FIS Alpine Ski World Cup.

== World Cup results ==
Top 15

Date	Place	Discipline	Rank
11 March 2022	Åre, Sweden	Giant Slalom	14
