= 2021–22 Four Hills Tournament =

Ski jumping competition

Four Hills Tournament at the 2021–22 FIS Ski Jumping World Cup
- Venue: Schattenbergschanze, Große Olympiaschanze, Paul-Ausserleitner-Schanze
- Location: Austria, Germany
- Dates: 29 December 2021 – 6 January 2022

Medalists
gold medal	(Japan) Ryōyū Kobayashi
silver medal	(Norway) Marius Lindvik
bronze medal	(Norway) Halvor Egner Granerud

The 2021–22 Four Hills Tournament took place at the four traditional venues of Oberstdorf, Garmisch-Partenkirchen, Innsbruck, and Bischofshofen, located in Germany and Austria, between 29 December 2021 and 6 January 2022. It was the 70th edition of the event.

On January 3, the qualifying series was held in Innsbruck, but strong winds on January 4 made it impossible for the competition to go ahead as scheduled. The tournament continued in Bischofshofen where the third leg was held on January 5 (both qualifiers and the competition), and the fourth leg on January 6 (again, both qualifiers and competition).

== Results ==
=== Oberstdorf ===
HS137 Schattenbergschanze, Germany
29 December 2021

Rank	Name	Nationality	Jump 1 (m)	Round 1 (pts)	Jump 2 (m)	Round 2 (pts)	Total Points
1	Ryōyū Kobayashi	Japan	128.5	143.6	141.0	158.4	302.0
2	Halvor Egner Granerud	Norway	132.0	147.6	133.0	151.6	299.2
3	Robert Johansson	Norway	135.5	152.2	131.0	146.4	298.6
4	Marius Lindvik	Norway	129.5	144.7	137.5	151.6	296.3
5	Karl Geiger	Germany	131.5	145.7	131.0	150.2	295.9
6	Lovro Kos	Slovenia	126.5	143.1	139.5	146.4	289.5
7	Markus Eisenbichler	Germany	129.5	133.8	132.5	147.3	281.1
8	Daniel Huber	Austria	129.0	137.3	126.5	131.7	269.0
9	Stephan Leyhe	Germany	124.5	134.0	125.0	132.8	266.8
10	Gregor Deschwanden	Switzerland	129.0	136.3	122.5	126.3	262.6

=== Garmisch-Partenkirchen ===
HS142 Große Olympiaschanze, Germany
1 January 2022

Rank	Name	Nationality	Jump 1 (m)	Round 1 (pts)	Jump 2 (m)	Round 2 (pts)	Total Points
1	Ryōyū Kobayashi	Japan	143.0	148.8	135.5	142.4	291.2
2	Markus Eisenbichler	Germany	141.0	145.8	143.5	145.2	291.0
3	Lovro Kos	Slovenia	135.5	138.4	138.0	147.6	286.0
4	Marius Lindvik	Norway	138.0	141.9	138.0	141.8	283.7
5	Jan Hörl	Austria	134.0	137.4	132.0	137.5	274.9
6	Yukiya Satō	Japan	132.5	135.5	130.0	132.4	267.9
7	Karl Geiger	Germany	130.0	134.6	127.5	130.4	265.0
8	Halvor Egner Granerud	Norway	128.0	121.7	140.5	142.5	264.2
9	Timi Zajc	Slovenia	137.0	139.6	127.5	124.5	264.1
10	Stephan Leyhe	Germany	128.0	127.0	136.5	136.7	263.7

=== Bischofshofen (originally scheduled for Innsbruck) ===
HS140 Paul-Ausserleitner-Schanze, Austria
5 January 2022

Rank	Name	Nationality	Jump 1 (m)	Round 1 (pts)	Jump 2 (m)	Round 2 (pts)	Total Points
1	Ryōyū Kobayashi	Japan	137.0	143.4	137.5	147.9	291.3
2	Marius Lindvik	Norway	137.5	149.1	135.5	137.5	286.6
3	Halvor Egner Granerud	Norway	135.5	141.3	135.5	141.1	282.4
4	Karl Geiger	Germany	133.0	139.4	136.0	141.4	280.8
5	Manuel Fettner	Austria	137.0	137.2	132.5	135.9	273.1
5	Jan Hörl	Austria	138.0	138.5	132.5	134.6	273.1
7	Robert Johansson	Norway	133.0	131.5	135.0	138.9	270.4
8	Markus Eisenbichler	Germany	130.0	130.1	140.5	140.2	270.3
9	Michael Hayböck	Austria	130.5	133.0	131.5	134.1	267.1
10	Yukiya Satō	Japan	137.0	136.3	126.5	126.6	262.9

=== Bischofshofen ===
HS142 Paul-Ausserleitner-Schanze, Austria
6 January 2022

Rank	Name	Nationality	Jump 1 (m)	Round 1 (pts)	Jump 2 (m)	Round 2 (pts)	Total Points
1	Daniel Huber	Austria	136.5	144.3	137.0	142.5	286.8
2	Halvor Egner Granerud	Norway	136.5	140.3	136.0	142.1	282.4
3	Karl Geiger	Germany	140.5	146.5	132.0	135.4	281.9
4	Yukiya Satō	Japan	139.0	142.4	134.5	138.7	281.1
5	Ryōyū Kobayashi	Japan	133.5	139.7	133.5	138.1	277.8
6	Robert Johansson	Norway	133.0	136.8	135.0	140.9	277.7
7	Jan Hörl	Austria	130.0	132.4	136.0	142.9	275.3
8	Markus Eisenbichler	Germany	133.0	137.3	134.0	137.9	275.2
9	Lovro Kos	Slovenia	132.0	130.9	144.0	142.7	273.6
10	Marius Lindvik	Norway	126.0	123.7	139.0	147.8	271.5

== Overall standings ==
The final standings after all four events:

Rank	Name	Nationality	Oberstdorf	Garmisch- Partenkirchen	Bischofshofen (1)	Bischofshofen (2)	Total Points
1st place, gold medalist(s)	Ryōyū Kobayashi	Japan	302.0 (1)	291.2 (1)	291.3 (1)	277.8 (5)	1,162.3
2nd place, silver medalist(s)	Marius Lindvik	Norway	296.3 (4)	283.7 (4)	286.6 (2)	271.5 (10)	1,138.1
3rd place, bronze medalist(s)	Halvor Egner Granerud	Norway	299.2 (2)	264.2 (8)	282.4 (3)	282.4 (2)	1,128.2
4	Karl Geiger	Germany	295.9 (5)	265.0 (7)	280.8 (4)	281.9 (3)	1,123.6
5	Markus Eisenbichler	Germany	281.1 (7)	291.0 (2)	270.3 (8)	275.2 (8)	1,117.6
6	Robert Johansson	Norway	298.6 (3)	261.2 (13)	270.4 (7)	277.7 (6)	1,107.9
7	Lovro Kos	Slovenia	289.5 (6)	286.0 (3)	243.9 (25)	273.6 (9)	1,093.0
8	Jan Hörl	Austria	252.4 (17)	274.9 (5)	273.1 (5)	275.3 (7)	1,075.7
9	Daniel Huber	Austria	269.0 (8)	257.1 (16)	257.0 (13)	286.8 (1)	1,069.9
10	Yukiya Satō	Japan	252.8 (16)	267.9 (6)	262.9 (10)	281.1 (4)	1,064.7
