= Giovanni Franzoni (alpine skier) =

Italian alpine skier (born 2001)

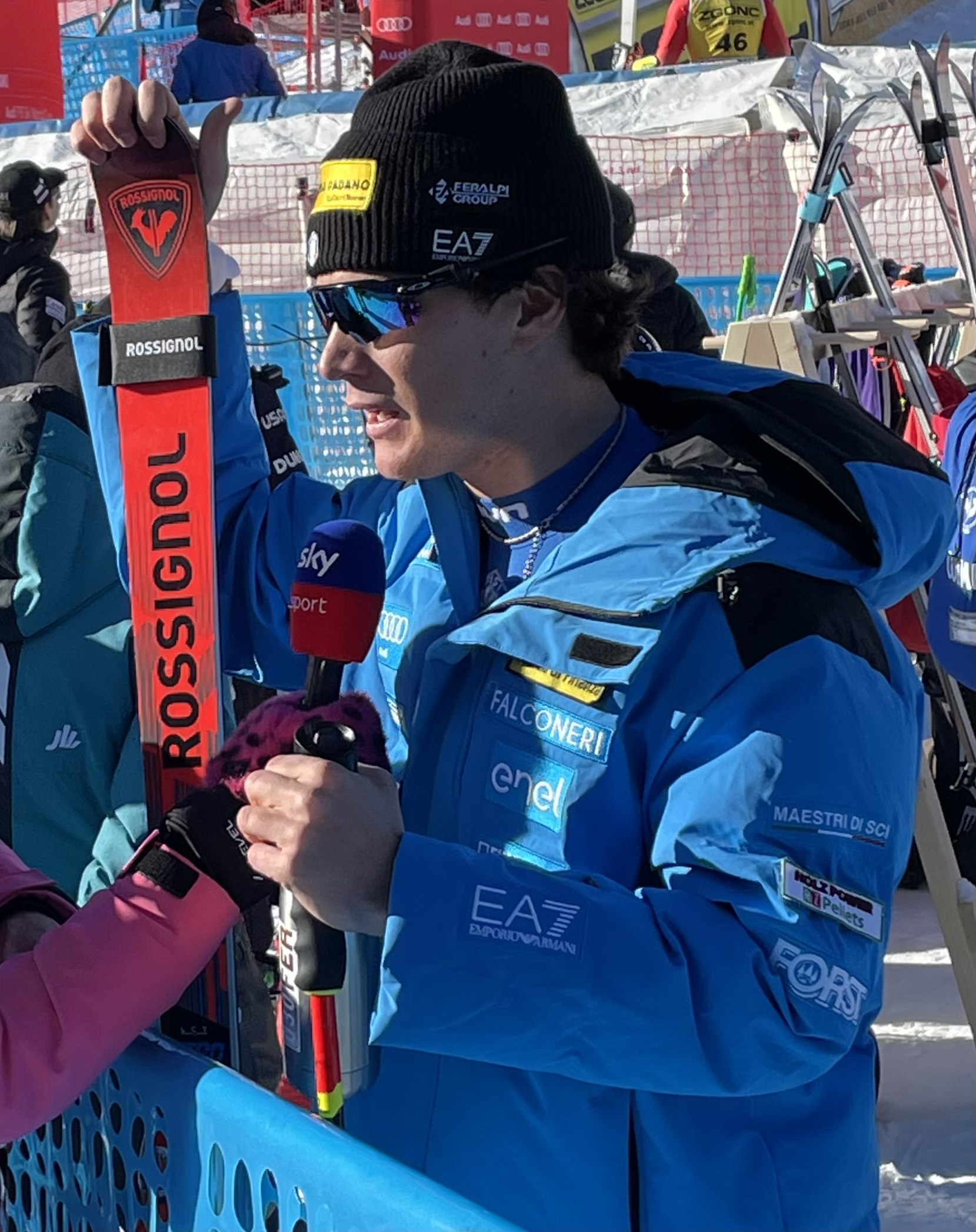
- Franzoni in 2025

Personal information
- Born: 30 March 2001 (age 25) Manerba del Garda, Italy
- Height: 1.83 m (6 ft 0 in)

Skiing career
- Sport: Alpine skiing
- Club: G.S. Fiamme Gialle
- Disciplines: Downhill, Super-G, Giant slalom
- World Cup debut: 20 December 2020 (age 19)

Olympics
- Teams: 1 – (2026)
- Medals: 1

World Championships
- Teams: 2 – (2021, 2025)
- Medals: 0

World Cup
- Seasons: 6 – (2021–2026)
- Wins: 2 – (1 DH, 1 SG)
- Podiums: 5 – (3 DH, 2 SG)
- Overall titles: 0 – (49th in 2025)
- Discipline titles: 0 – (4th in SG, 2026)
Medal record
Men's alpine skiing
Representing Italy
World Cup race podiums
Event	1st	2nd	3rd
Super-G	1	0	1
Downhill	1	1	1
Total	2	1	2
Olympic Games
Silver medal – second place	2026 Milano Cortina	Downhill
Junior World Championships
Gold medal – first place	2021 Bansko	Super-G
Gold medal – first place	2022 Panorama	Downhill
Gold medal – first place	2022 Panorama	Combined
Silver medal – second place	2021 Bansko	Giant slalom
Bronze medal – third place	2022 Panorama	Super-G

Giovanni Franzoni (born 30 March 2001) is an Italian World Cup alpine ski racer.

On 24 January 2026, he won the classic downhill race Streif in Kitzbühel, thus winning the prestigious Hahnenkamm trophy.

== Career ==
Franzoni won Europa Cup in 2022 season. In his 2026 World Cup season, Franzoni achieved five World Cup podium finishes in speed events – including his first career victory in the legendary Kitzbühel downhill, and won the silver medal in the men's downhill at the home 2026 Winter Olympic Games.

== World Cup results ==
=== Season standings ===
Season
Season	Age	Overall	Slalom	Giant slalom	Super G	Downhill
2022	20	138	—	51	53	—
2023	21	133	—	—	58	59
2024	22	140	—	—	52	—
2025	23	49	—	—	13	32
2026	24	10	—	—	4	5

=== Race podiums ===
- 2 wins (1 SG, 1 DH)
- 5 podiums (2 SG, 3 DH)

Season
Season	Date	Location	Discipline	Place
2026	18 December 2025	Val Gardena, Italy	Super-G	3rd
2026	16 January 2026	Wengen, Switzerland	Super-G	1st
2026	17 January 2026	Wengen, Switzerland	Downhill	3rd
2026	24 January 2026	Kitzbühel, Austria	Downhill	1st
2026	13 March 2026	Courchevel, France	Downhill	2nd

== World Championship results ==
Year
Year	Age	Slalom	Giant slalom	Super-G	Downhill	Combined	Team combined	Parallel
2021	19	—	14	—	—	23	—N/a	BDNF
2025	23	—	20	DNF	21	—N/a	—	—N/a

== Olympic results ==
Year
Year	Age	Slalom	Giant slalom	Super-G	Downhill	Team combined
2026	24	—	24	6	2	7
