= Sugadaira Dam =

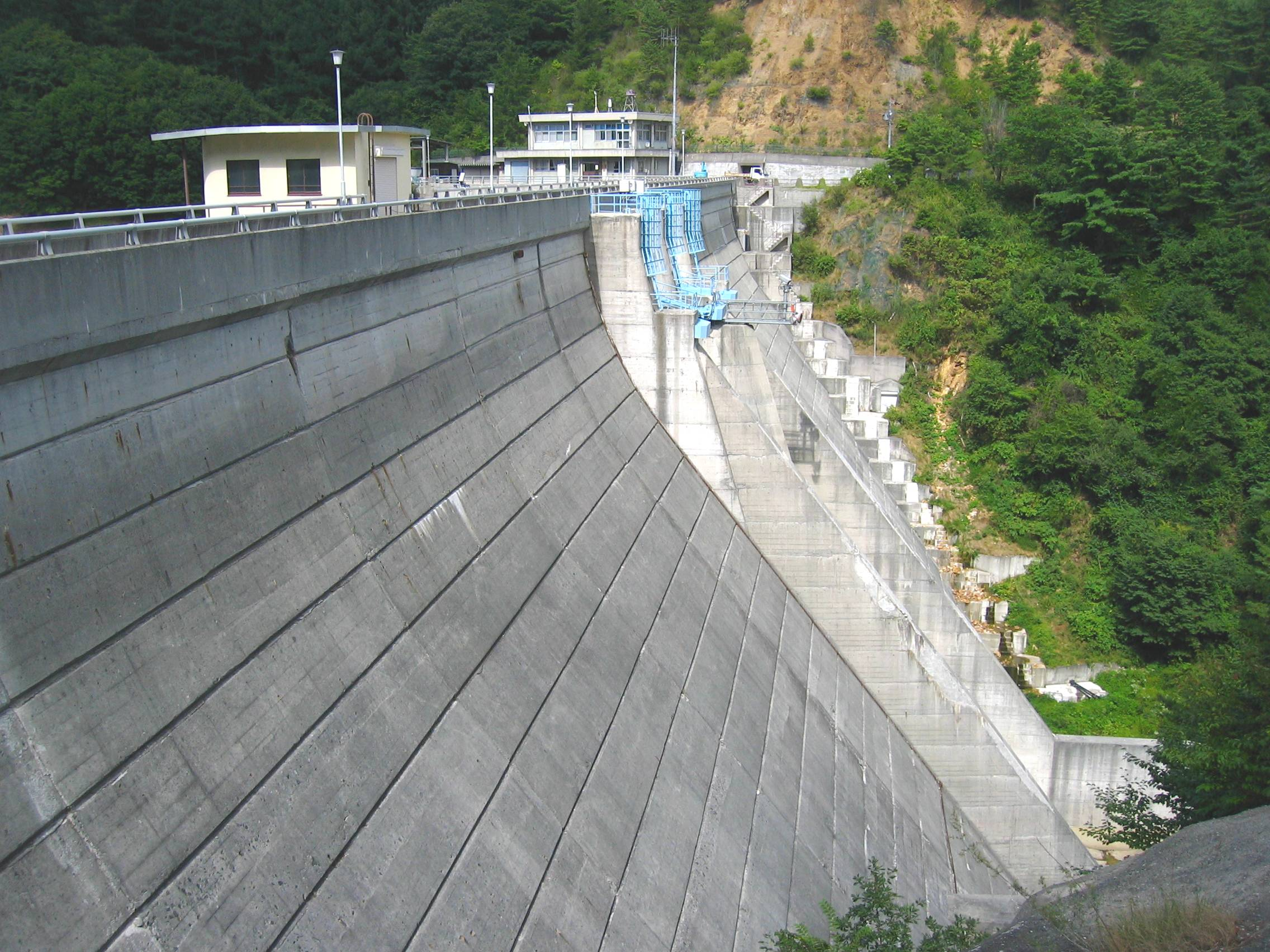
- Interactive map of Sugadaira Dam
- Location: Nagano Prefecture, Japan
- Coordinates: 36°30′08″N 138°20′57″E

Sugadaira Dam (Japanese: 菅平ダム) is a dam in the Nagano Prefecture, Japan, completed in 1968.
