= Elsa Fermbäck =

Swedish alpine skier (born 1998)

Personal information
- Born: 28 March 1998 (age 28) Östersund, Sweden

Skiing career
- Sport: Alpine skiing
- Club: Vemdalens IF
- Disciplines: Slalom
- World Cup debut: 17 November 2018 (age 20)

Olympics
- Teams: 1 – (2022)
- Medals: 0

World Championships
- Teams: 1 – (2021)
- Medals: 0 (0 gold)

World Cup
- Seasons: 6 – (2019–2022, 2024-2025)
- Wins: 0
- Podiums: 0
- Overall titles: 0
- Discipline titles: 0

Elsa Fermbäck (born 28 March 1998) is a Swedish World Cup alpine ski racer.

Fermbäck made her World Cup debut in November 2018 in Levi, Finland. Her best result in World Cup to date is a 21st place in slalom from 2021. She participated at the 2021 World Ski Championships, where she achieved a 16th place in slalom.

== World Championship results ==
Year	Age	Slalom	Giant slalom	Super-G	Downhill	Combined	Team event
2021	22	16	-	—	—	—	-
