= Noel von Grünigen =

Swiss alpine skier (born 1995)

Personal information
- Born: 17 April 1995 (age 31) Zweisimmen, Switzerland
- Height: 1.78 m (5 ft 10 in)

Skiing career
- Sport: Alpine skiing
- Disciplines: Technical events
- World Cup debut: 2019

World Cup
- Seasons: 3

Noel von Grünigen (born 17 April 1995) is a Swiss World Cup alpine ski racer.

He is the son of the Swiss alpine skiing champion Michael von Grünigen.

== National titles ==
- Swiss Alpine Ski Championships
  - Slalom: 2021
