= Simone Wild =

Swiss alpine skier (born 1993)

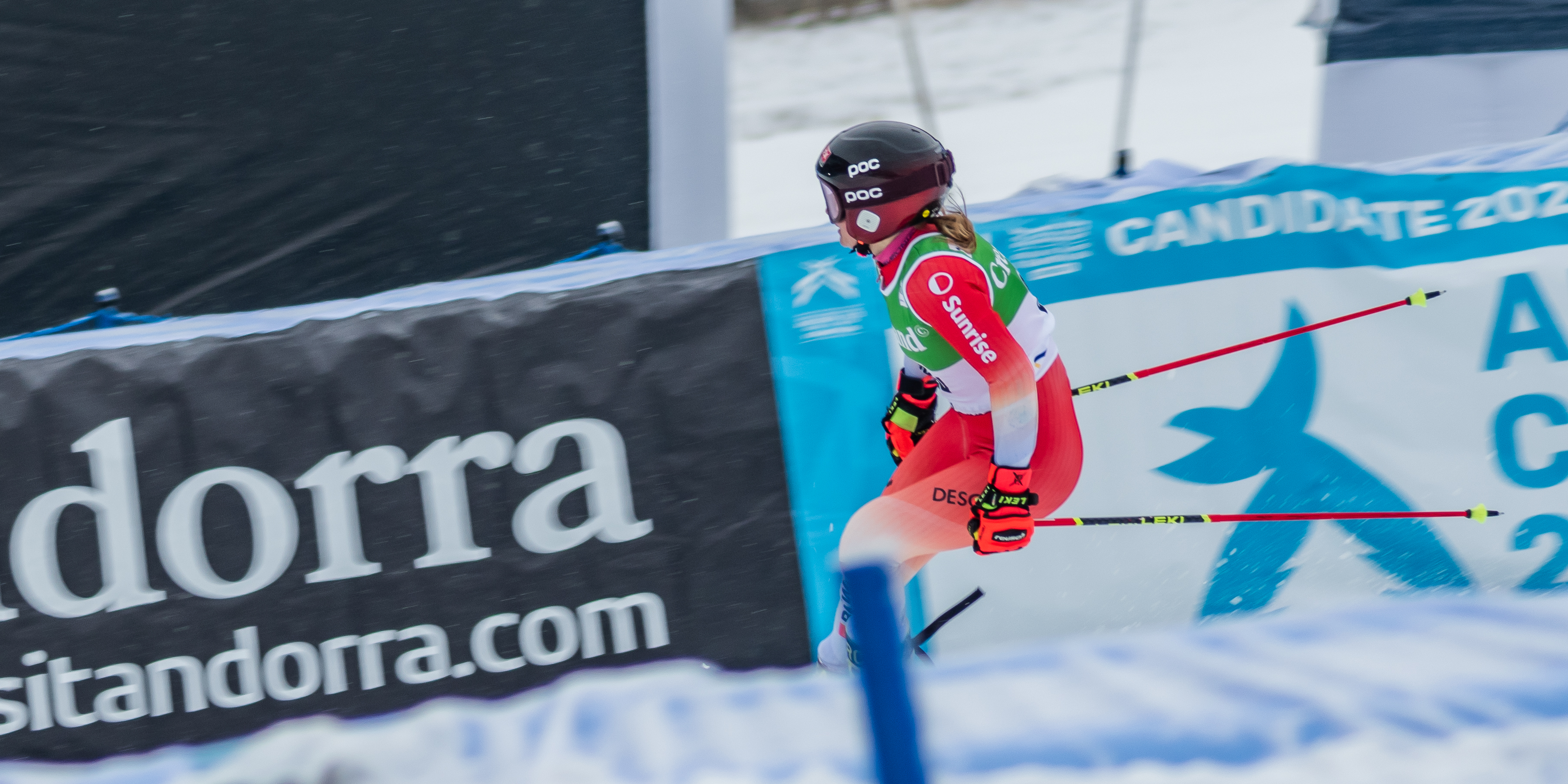
- Wild in 2024

Personal information
- Born: 7 December 1993 (age 32) Adliswil, Switzerland
- Height: 1.60 m (5 ft 3 in)

Skiing career
- Sport: Alpine skiing
- Club: SC Flumserberg
- World Cup debut: 2016

World Cup
- Seasons: 6

Simone Wild (born 7 December 1993) is a Swiss alpine ski racer who competed at the 2018 Winter Olympics.
