= Juliana Suter =

Swiss alpine skier

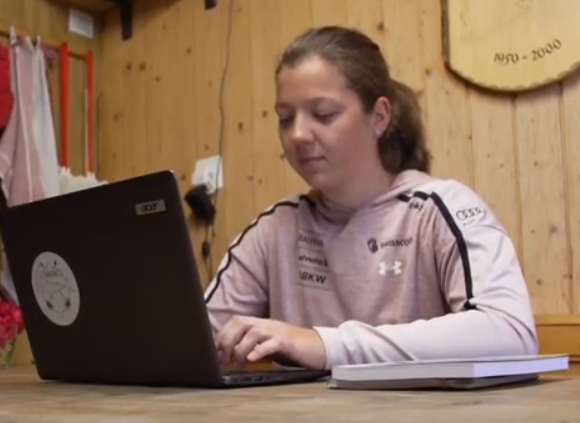
- Suter in 2021

Personal information
- Born: 28 April 1998 (age 28) Stoos, Switzerland

Skiing career
- Sport: Alpine skiing
- Club: SC Stoos
- Disciplines: Speed events
- World Cup debut: 2019

World Cup
- Seasons: 5
Medal record
Women's alpine skiing
Representing Switzerland
World Junior Championships
Gold medal – first place	2019 Val di Fassa	Downhill
Silver medal – second place	2018 Davos	Downhill

Juliana Suter (born 28 April 1998) is a Swiss former alpine skier.

She is the sister of two World Cup alpine skiers Jasmina and Raphaela, who call themselves Suter Sisters Stoos, being originally from the Swiss village Stoos. But she is not related to the skiers Corinne Suter and Fabienne Suter.

== Career ==
During her career, she has achieved two results among the top 15 in the FIS Alpine Ski World Cup.

== World Cup results ==
Top 15

Date	Place	Discipline	Rank
14-01-2023	(Austria) St. Anton	Super G	14
02-12-2022	(Canada) Lake Louise	Downhill	14
