= Elisa Mörzinger =

Austrian alpine skier

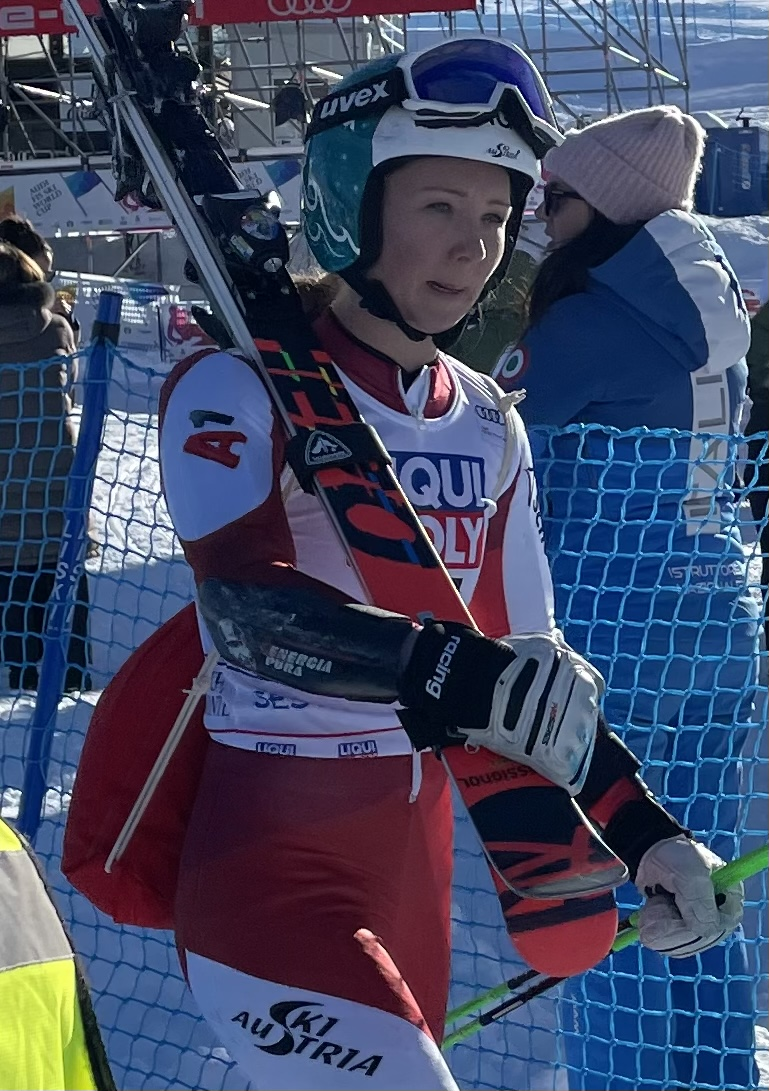

Personal information
- Born: 6 May 1997 (age 29) Austria

Skiing career
- Sport: Alpine skiing
- Disciplines: Slalom, giant slalom
World Cup debut
26 October 2019 (age 22)

World Cup
- Seasons: 1 – (2020–)
- Podiums: 1 – (1 PGS)

Elisa Mörzinger (born 6 May 1997) is an Austrian World Cup alpine ski racer. Mörzinger focuses on the technical events of slalom and giant slalom.

== Career ==
In October 2019, Mörzinger made her World Cup debut in the giant slalom at Sölden, Austria. In January 2020, she scored her first World Cup points and achieved her first podium in the Parallel giant slalom in Sestriere, Italy.

== World Cup results ==
=== Season standings ===
Season
Season	Age	Overall	Slalom	Giant; Slalom	Super G	Downhill	Combined	Parallel
2020	22	50	—	—	—	—	—	4

Standings through 19 January 2020

=== Race podiums ===
- 1 podium (1 PGS)

Season
Season	Date	Location	Discipline	Place
2020	19 Jan 2020	Sestriere, Italy	Parallel giant slalom	2nd
