= 2023–24 FIS Alpine Ski Europa Cup =

Alpine skiing competition

Discipline	Men	Women
Overall	(Austria) Manuel Traninger	(Switzerland) Janine Schmitt
Downhill	(Switzerland) Livio Hiltbrand	(Austria) Emily Schöpf
Super-G	(France) Florian Loriot	(Switzerland) Janine Schmitt
Giant slalom	(Germany) Jonas Stockinger	(Italy) Ilaria Ghisalberti
Slalom	(Norway) Theodor Brækken	(Norway) Bianca Bakke Westhoff

Competition
Edition	53rd	53rd
Locations	18	18
Individual	32	30
Cancelled	6	8

The 2023–24 FIS Alpine Ski Europa Cup, organised by the International Ski Federation (FIS) is the 53rd consecutive Europa Cup season, the second international level competition in alpine skiing.

The season started on 6 December 2023 in Zinal, Switzerland, and will conclude on 22 March 2024 in Kvitfjell, Norway.

== Men ==
=== Calendar ===
Stage	Date	Place	Discipline	Winner	Second	Third	Ref.
1	7 December 2023	(Switzerland) Zinal	Giant slalom	(France) Léo Anguenot	(Germany) Fabian Gratz	(Switzerland) Livio Simonet	
2	14 December 2023	(Italy) Santa Caterina	Downhill	(Austria) Vincent Wieser	(Austria) Manuel Traninger	(Switzerland) Livio Hiltbrand	
3	15 December 2023	(Italy) Santa Caterina	Downhill	(Austria) Stefan Rieser	(Austria) Vincent Wieser	(Switzerland) Livio Hiltbrand	
4	17 December 2023	(Italy) Val di Fassa	Slalom	(France) Steven Amiez	(Germany) Linus Straßer	(Sweden) Fabian Ax Swartz	
5	19 December 2023	(Italy) Obereggen	Slalom	(Switzerland) Reto Schmidiger	(Switzerland) Matthias Iten	(Norway) Eirik Hystad Solberg	
6	21 December 2023	(France) Valloire	Giant slalom	(Denmark) Christian Borgnæs	(Italy) Simon Talacci	(Austria) Joshua Sturm	
7	22 December 2023	(France) Valloire	Giant slalom	(France) Léo Anguenot	(Denmark) Christian Borgnæs	(France) Flavio Vitale	
8	10 January 2024	(Austria) Saalbach-Hinterglemm	Super-G	(France) Florian Loriot	(France) Adrien Fresquet	(Italy) Giovanni Borsotti	
9	11 January 2024	(Austria) Saalbach-Hinterglemm	Super-G	(Austria) Felix Hacker	(Switzerland) Remi Cuche	(France) Florian Loriot	
	11 January 2024	(Austria) Saalbach-Hinterglemm	Downhill	cancelled			
	12 January 2024	(Austria) Saalbach-Hinterglemm	Downhill	cancelled			
10	13 January 2024	(Germany) Berchtesgaden	Slalom	(Norway) Eirik Hystad Solberg	(Sweden) Emil Pettersson	(Switzerland) Reto Schmidiger	
11	14 January 2024	(Germany) Berchtesgaden	Slalom	(Switzerland) Fadri Janutin	(Norway) Theodor Brækken	(Switzerland) Noel von Grünigen	
12	17 January 2024	(France) Val Cenis	Giant slalom	(Germany) Fabian Gratz	(Switzerland) Livio Simonet	(Italy) Simon Talacci	
	18 January 2024	(France) Val Cenis	Giant slalom	cancelled			
13	22 January 2024	(Italy) Tarvisio	Super-G	(Austria) Vincent Wieser	(Austria) Stefan Eichberger	(Austria) Christoph Krenn	
14	25 January 2024	(Italy) Tarvisio	Downhill	(Switzerland) Lars Rösti	(Germany) Luis Vogt	(Liechtenstein) Marco Pfiffner	
15	26 January 2024	(Italy) Tarvisio	Downhill	(Italy) Nicolò Molteni	(Switzerland) Lars Rösti	(France) Adrien Fresquet	
16	5 February 2024	(Switzerland) Gstaad Saanenland	Slalom	(Sweden) Fabian Ax Swartz	(Norway) Theodor Brækken	(Switzerland) Matthias Iten	
17	6 February 2024	(Switzerland) Gstaad Saanenland	Slalom	(Norway) Theodor Brækken	(Switzerland) Tanguy Nef	(Sweden) Fabian Ax Swartz	
	12 February 2024	(Slovenia) Maribor	Giant slalom	cancelled			
	13 February 2024	(Slovenia) Maribor	Giant slalom	cancelled			
18	21 February 2024	(Italy) Sella Nevea	Super-G	(France) Florian Loriot	(Italy) Giovanni Franzoni	(Austria) Christoph Krenn	
19	22 February 2024	(Italy) Sella Nevea	Super-G	(France) Florian Loriot	(Italy) Giovanni Franzoni	(Austria) Christoph Krenn	
20	26 February 2024	(Austria) Pass Thurn	Giant slalom	(Austria) Noel Zwischenbrugger	(France) Flavio Vitale	(Norway) Hans Grahl-Madsen	
21	27 February 2024	(Austria) Pass Thurn	Giant slalom	(Norway) Jesper Wahlqvist	(Germany) Jonas Stockinger	(Austria) Noel Zwischenbrugger	
	1 March 2024	(Switzerland) Stoos	Super-G	cancelled			
22	5 March 2024	(Switzerland) Verbier	Downhill	(Austria) Manuel Traninger	(Austria) Christoph Krenn	(Austria) Stefan Rieser	
23	7 March 2024	(Switzerland) Verbier	Downhill	(Switzerland) Lars Rösti	(Austria) Manuel Traninger	(Austria) Christoph Krenn	
24	8 March 2024	(Switzerland) Verbier	Super-G	(Switzerland) Arnaud Boisset	(Italy) Emanuele Buzzi	(Austria) Stefan Eichberger	
25	10 March 2024	(Sweden) Kläppen	Slalom	(Finland) Eduard Hallberg	(Switzerland) Tanguy Nef	(Sweden) Fabian Ax Swartz	
26	11 March 2024	(Sweden) Kläppen	Slalom	(Norway) Theodor Brækken	(Switzerland) Noel von Grünigen	(Spain) Joaquim Salarich	
27	13 March 2024	(Norway) Trysil	Giant slalom	(Norway) Jesper Wahlqvist	(Germany) Stefan Luitz	(Norway) Fredrik Møller	
28	14 March 2024	(Norway) Trysil	Giant slalom	(France) Diego Orecchioni	(Italy) Hannes Zingerle	(Germany) Jonas Stockinger	
29	17 March 2024	(Norway) Hafjell	Slalom	(Finland) Eduard Hallberg	(Norway) Theodor Brækken	(Sweden) Fabian Ax Swartz	
30	18 March 2024	(Norway) Hafjell	Giant slalom	(France) Diego Orecchioni	(Norway) Jesper Wahlqvist	(Switzerland) Marco Fischbacher	
31	21 March 2024	(Norway) Kvitfjell	Downhill	(Switzerland) Livio Hiltbrand	(Italy) Nicolò Molteni	(Liechtenstein) Marco Pfiffner	
32	22 March 2024	(Norway) Kvitfjell	Super-G	(Germany) Jacob Schramm (Italy) Nicolò Molteni	–	(Italy) Giovanni Franzoni	

=== Rankings ===
==== Overall ====
Rank	after all 32 events	Points
1	(Austria) Manuel Traninger	588
2	(Norway) Theodor Brækken	582
3	(Austria) Vincent Wieser	519
4	(Italy) Giovanni Franzoni	495
5	(Austria) Stefan Eichberger	490

==== Downhill ====
Rank	after all 7 events	Points
1	(Switzerland) Livio Hiltbrand	382
2	(Switzerland) Lars Rösti	340
3	(Austria) Stefan Rieser	318
4	(Austria) Manuel Traninger	312
5	(Austria) Vincent Wieser	282

==== Super-G ====
Rank	after all 7 events	Points
1	(France) Florian Loriot	416
2	(Italy) Giovanni Franzoni	310
3	(Austria) Manuel Traninger	276
4	(Austria) Stefan Eichberger	269
5	(Italy) Emanuele Buzzi	268

==== Giant slalom ====
Rank	after all 9 events	Points
1	(Germany) Jonas Stockinger	370
2	(Norway) Jesper Wahlqvist	339
3	(France) Diego Orecchioni	327
4	(Italy) Simon Talacci	321
5	(Austria) Noel Zwischenbrugger	299

==== Slalom ====
Rank	after all 9 events	Points
1	(Norway) Theodor Brækken	559
2	(Sweden) Fabian Ax Swartz	435
3	(Finland) Eduard Hallberg	336
4	(Norway) Eirik Hystad Solberg	334
5	(Switzerland) Tanguy Nef	330

== Women ==
=== Calendar ===
Stage	Date	Place	Discipline	Winner	Second	Third	Ref.
	5 December 2023	(Switzerland) Zinal	Giant slalom	cancelled			
1	6 December 2023	(Switzerland) Zinal	Giant slalom	(Austria) Nina Astner	(Switzerland) Stefanie Grob	(Switzerland) Janine Schmitt	
2	9 December 2023	(Austria) Mayrhofen	Giant slalom	(Sweden) Liv Ceder	(Italy) Lara Della Mea	(France) Marie Lamure	
3	10 December 2023	(Austria) Mayrhofen	Slalom	(Italy) Lara Della Mea	(Italy) Martina Peterlini	(Switzerland) Nicole Good	
4	12 December 2023	(Switzerland) St. Moritz	Super-G	(Austria) Lisa Grill	(Canada) Valérie Grenier	(United States) Tricia Mangan	
	13 December 2023	(Switzerland) St. Moritz	Super-G	cancelled			
5	15 December 2023	(Italy) Valle Aurina / Ahrntal	Slalom	(Switzerland) Nicole Good	(Austria) Lisa Hörhager	(France) Doriane Escané	
6	16 December 2023	(Italy) Valle Aurina / Ahrntal	Slalom	(France) Doriane Escané	(Switzerland) Nicole Good	(France) Marion Chevrier	
7	20 December 2023	(Italy) Passo San Pellegrino	Downhill	(Austria) Lisa Grill	(Austria) Emily Schöpf	(Italy) Nicol Delago	
8	21 December 2023	(Italy) Passo San Pellegrino	Downhill	(Austria) Lisa Grill	(Austria) Emily Schöpf	(Italy) Sara Thaler	
	22 December 2023	(Italy) Passo San Pellegrino	Super-G	cancelled			
9	8 January 2024	(Italy) Sestriere	Giant slalom	(France) Doriane Escané	(Switzerland) Stefanie Grob	(Austria) Nina Astner	
10	9 January 2024	(Italy) Sestriere	Giant slalom	(France) Doriane Escané	(Austria) Nina Astner	(Italy) Lara Della Mea	
11	12 January 2024	(Austria) Zell am See	Slalom	(Latvia) Dženifera Ģērmane	(Norway) Bianca Bakke Westhoff	(United Kingdom) Charlie Guest	
12	13 January 2024	(Austria) Zell am See	Slalom	(Latvia) Dženifera Ģērmane	(Norway) Bianca Bakke Westhoff	(France) Clarisse Breche	
	17 January 2024	(Austria) St. Anton	Downhill	cancelled			
	18 January 2024	(Austria) St. Anton	Downhill	cancelled			
13	23 January 2024	(France) Orcières-Merlette 1850	Downhill	(Austria) Emily Schöpf	(Italy) Sara Thaler	(Germany) Nadine Kapfer	
14	24 January 2024	(France) Orcières-Merlette 1850	Downhill	(Austria) Emily Schöpf	(Italy) Sara Thaler	(France) Garance Meyer	
15	25 January 2024	(France) Orcières-Merlette 1850	Super-G	(Italy) Vicky Bernardi	(Switzerland) Janine Schmitt	(Switzerland) Malorie Blanc	
16	5 February 2024	(Italy) La Thuile	Super-G	(Italy) Teresa Runggaldier	(Switzerland) Malorie Blanc	(Switzerland) Jasmina Suter	
17	6 February 2024	(Italy) La Thuile	Super-G	(France) Karen Clément	(United States) Tricia Mangan	(Switzerland) Malorie Blanc	
18	(Note: Rescheduled from 10 February 2024)11 February 2024	(Switzerland) Crans Montana	Downhill	(France) Karen Clément	(Czech Republic) Ester Ledecká	(Austria) Nadine Fest	
19	11 February 2024	(Switzerland) Crans Montana	Downhill	(Bosnia and Herzegovina) Elvedina Muzaferija	(United States) Tricia Mangan	(Switzerland) Delia Durrer	
20	21 February 2024	(Liechtenstein) Malbun	Slalom	(Croatia) Leona Popović	(United Kingdom) Charlie Guest	(Italy) Emilia Mondinelli	
21	22 February 2024	(Liechtenstein) Malbun	Slalom	(Sweden) Hanna Aronsson Elfman	(Switzerland) Nicole Good	(Sweden) Moa Boström Mussener	
	24 February 2024	(Germany) Oberjoch	Giant slalom	cancelled			
	25 February 2024	(Germany) Oberjoch	Giant slalom	cancelled			
22	29 February 2024	(Italy) Sarntal	Super-G	(Italy) Asja Zenere	(Austria) Magdalena Egger	(Switzerland) Isabella Pedrazzi	
	1 March 2024	(Italy) Sarntal	Super-G	cancelled			
23	10 March 2024	(Norway) Ål	Giant slalom	(Italy) Ilaria Ghisalberti	(France) June Brand	(Norway) Marte Monsen	
24	11 March 2024	(Norway) Ål	Giant slalom	(France) Karen Clément	(Liechtenstein) Charlotte Lingg	(Germany) Fabiana Dorigo	
25	13 March 2024	(Norway) Norefjell	Slalom	(Sweden) Hanna Aronsson Elfman	(Norway) Bianca Bakke Westhoff	(France) Maria Lamure	
26	14 March 2024	(Norway) Norefjell	Slalom	(Italy) Emilia Mondinelli	(Switzerland) Elena Stoffel	(Sweden) Cornelia Öhlund	
27	16 March 2024	(Norway) Hafjell	Slalom	(Switzerland) Elena Stoffel	(Norway) Bianca Bakke Westhoff	(Norway) Kristin Lysdahl	
28	17 March 2024	(Norway) Hafjell	Giant slalom	(Norway) Marte Monsen	(Italy) Lara Della Mea	(Italy) Ilaria Ghisalberti	
29	21 March 2024	(Norway) Kvitfjell	Downhill	(Italy) Nadia Delago	(Austria) Magdalena Egger	(Italy) Sara Thaler	
30	22 March 2024	(Norway) Kvitfjell	Super-G	(France) Tifany Roux	(Austria) Magdalena Egger	(Italy) Nadia Delago	

=== Rankings ===
==== Overall ====
Rank	after all 30 events	Points
1	(Switzerland) Janine Schmitt	552
2	(France) Karen Clément	548
3	(Austria) Emily Schöpf	531
4	(Austria) Magdalena Egger	522
5	(Norway) Bianca Bakke Westhoff	494

==== Downhill ====
Rank	after all 7 events	Points
1	(Austria) Emily Schöpf	452
2	(Italy) Sara Thaler	368
3	(France) Karen Clément	264
4	(Austria) Magdalena Egger	255
5	(Austria) Lisa Grill	200

==== Super-G ====
Rank	after all 6 events	Points
1	(Switzerland) Janine Schmitt	270
2	(Austria) Magdalena Egger	234
3	(Italy) Vicky Bernardi	218
4	(Switzerland) Malorie Blanc	216
5	(France) Tifany Roux	193

==== Giant slalom ====
Rank	after all 7 events	Points
1	(Italy) Ilaria Ghisalberti	330
2	(Switzerland) Stefanie Grob	322
3	(Italy) Lara Della Mea	287
4	(Norway) Marte Monsen	275
5	(Austria) Nina Astner	262

==== Slalom ====
Rank	after all 10 events	Points
1	(Norway) Bianca Bakke Westhoff	456
2	(Switzerland) Nicole Good	444
3	(Italy) Emilia Mondinelli	415
4	(France) Marion Chevrier	301
5	(Sweden) Moa Boström Mussener	285

== Podium table by nation ==
Table showing the Europa Cup podium places (gold–1st place, silver–2nd place, bronze–3rd place) by the countries represented by the athletes.

Rank	Nation	Gold	Silver	Bronze	Total
1	Austria	12	10	10	32
2	France	12	3	8	23
3	Switzerland	6	13	13	32
4	Italy	6	8	6	20
5	Norway	4	4	3	11
6	Sweden	3	1	4	8
7	Latvia	2	0	0	2
8	Germany	1	4	2	7
9	Denmark	1	1	0	2
10	Bosnia and Herzegovina	1	0	0	1
10	Croatia	1	0	0	1
10	Finland	1	0	0	1
13	United States	0	2	1	3
14	Great Britain	0	1	1	2
14	Liechtenstein	0	1	1	2
16	Canada	0	1	0	1
16	Czech Republic	0	1	0	1
18	Spain	0	0	1	1
Totals (18 entries)		50	50	50	150
