= 2024 Alpine Skiing World Cup – Women's slalom =

Alpine ski discipline year standings

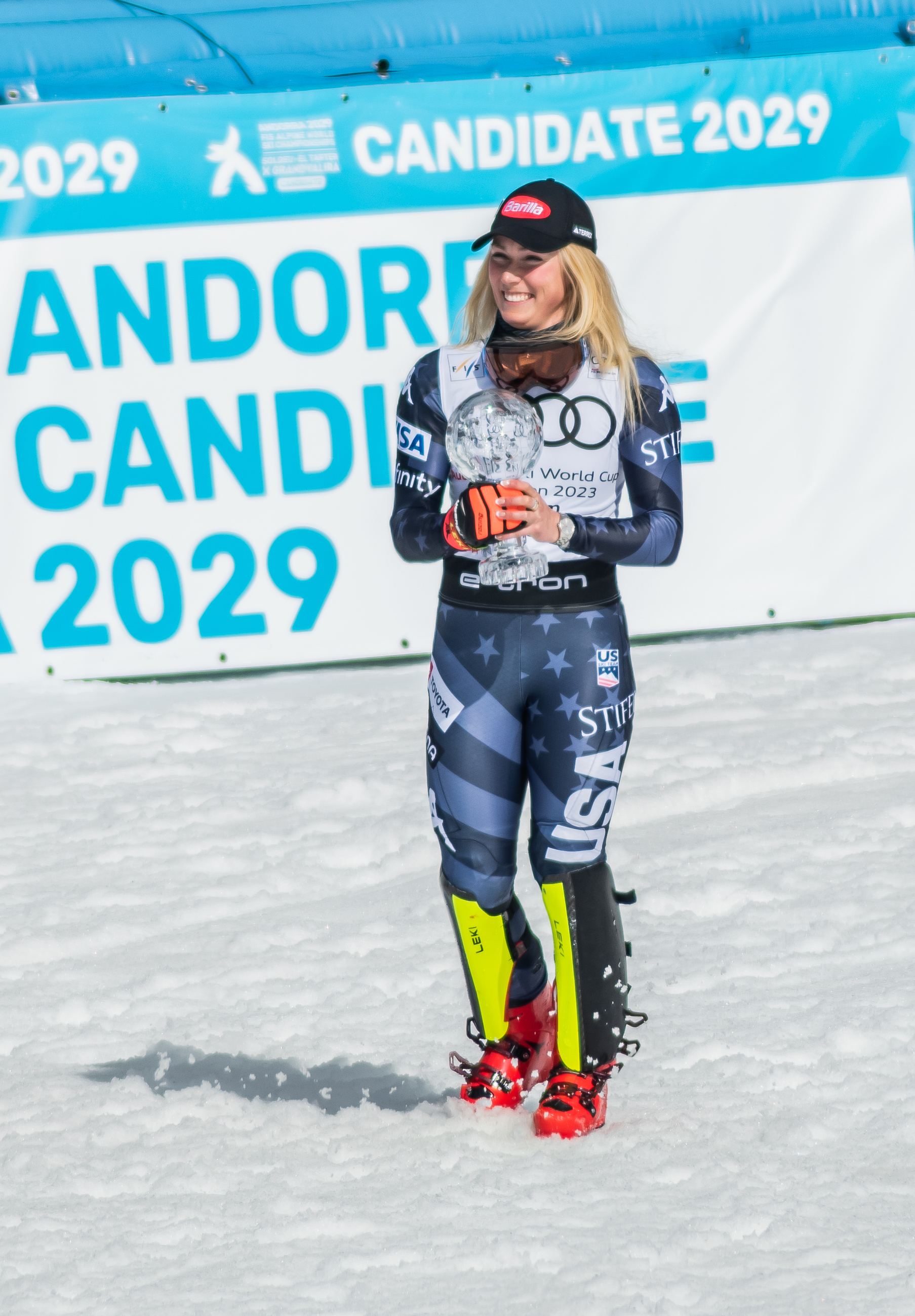
2024 Women's Slalom World Cup: Mikaela Shiffrin of the United States, season champion for the eighth time; 2024 Women's World Cup; Overall • Downhill • Super-G; Giant slalom • Slalom
Previous: 2023	Next: 2025

The women's slalom in the 2024 FIS Alpine Skiing World Cup consisted of eleven events, including the final. The slalom season began with the traditional "reindeer" opening races in Levi, Finland on 11-12 November 2023. Defending champion Mikaela Shiffrin of the United States repeated as champion, her eighth victory in the discipline, tying the record for most victories in one discipline.

== Season summary ==
The traditional opening slalom races in Levi, which have not been won by someone other than the duo of Mikaela Shiffrin of the United States and Petra Vlhová of Slovakia since the race was cancelled in 2015, held true to form when Vlhová won the first one and Shiffrin won the second. For Shiffrin, this was her seventh race victory at the venue. Shiffrin then won the slalom at Killington, her sixth victory there in slalom in seven starts, and established a 70-point lead in the discipline for the season. In the final event before Christmas, though, Vlhová edged Shiffrin at Courchevel, with no one else finishing within two seconds of her, which reduced Shiffrin's lead in the discipline to 50 points. However, Shiffrin won the last slalom of the year (in Lienz) by over 2.3 seconds against the field, with Vlhova fifth, stretching Shiffrin's season lead to 105 points.

In the first race of 2024, in the fog and rain of Kranjska Gora, Shiffrin struggled with the conditions and failed to complete her first run. Vlhová took full advantage, winning the race and closing her deficit in the discipline down to 5 points. However, the two races during the week of 15 January decided the season, as Schiffrin won both: first in Flachau, Austria, edging Vlhová in a mid-week night race, and then in Jasná, Slovakia, where Vlhová, skiing less than 20 km from her childhood home, suffered a season-ending ligament tear, leaving Shiffrin with a 125-point lead over Vlhová and a 228-point lead over her closest active competitor, Lena Dürr of Germany (who finished seventh), with only three races remaining in the discipline for the season.

However, while recovering from ligament sprains, Shiffrin missed the next race in Andorra, which was then won by Sweden's Anna Swenn-Larsson for her second career victory. But Shiffrin returned for the last race before finals in Åre and posted the fastest time on each run to win by well over a second and clinch the season championship in the discipline.

== Finals ==
The World Cup finals in the discipline took place on Saturday, 16 March 2024 in Saalbach-Hinterglemm, Austria. Only the top 25 skiers in the World Cup slalom discipline and the winner of the Junior World Championship in the discipline, plus any skiers who have scored at least 500 points in the World Cup overall classification for the season, were eligible to compete in the final, and only the top 15 earned World Cup points. In this race, the winner of the women's slalom Junior World Championship (Dženifera Ģērmane) was already eligible as one of the top 25 skiers in the discipline for the season, and no skier with at least 500 points who wasn't otherwise eligible chose to compete. Due to injuries to Vhlová and Wendy Holdener, only 23 skiers competed.

Although Shiffrin had already clinched the discipline championship, she also won the final for her 97th total World Cup victory (and 60th victory in slalom) in her final race of the season. By placing 15th in the final (the final scoring position, worth 16 points), Dürr finally edged past the injured Vhlová (by 3 points) for second in the discipline for the season.

== Standings ==
	Venue	11 Nov 2023; Levi	12 Nov 2023; Levi	26 Nov 2023; Killington	21 Dec 2023; Courchevel	29 Dec 2023; Lienz	7 Jan 2024; Kranjska Gora	16 Jan 2024; Flachau	21 Jan 2024; Jasná	11 Feb 2024; Soldeu	10 Mar 2024; Åre	16 Mar 2023; Saalbach	
#	Skier	(Finland)	(Finland)	(United States)	(France)	(Austria)	(Slovenia)	(Austria)	(Slovakia)	(Andorra)	(Sweden)	(Austria)	Total
	(United States) Mikaela Shiffrin	50	100	100	80	100	DNF1	100	100	DNS	100	100	830
2	(Germany) Lena Dürr	80	60	50	DNF1	80	80	16	36	40	50	16	508
3	(Slovakia) Petra Vlhová	100	DNF2	80	100	45	100	80	DNS				505
4	(Switzerland) Michelle Gisin	10	16	40	40	60	26	50	40	50	60	26	418
5	(Sweden) Anna Swenn-Larsson	12	DNQ	7	16	50	DNF2	45	60	100	45	60	395
6	(Sweden) Sara Hector	45	50	29	DNF2	22	40	60	29	24	18	22	339
7	(Austria) Katharina Liensberger	60	32	DNF1	13	32	36	36	7	29	40	40	325
8	(Croatia) Zrinka Ljutić	29	26	26	DNF2	DNF1	DNF2	DNF2	80	80	80	DNF2	321
9	(Switzerland) Camille Rast	13	12	22	DNF1	4	50	40	50	45	22	32	290
10	(Austria) Katharina Huber	32	24	24	24	40	29	DNF1	24	15	15	45	272
11	(Canada) Ali Nullmeyer	40	40	20	20	24	12	DNF2	6	36	12	36	246
12	(United States) Paula Moltzan	16	DNF1	32	45	DNF2	45	DNF1	13	60	26	DNF2	237
13	(Austria) Katharina Truppe	15	DNF1	14	60	26	DNF1	18	15	32	DNF1	20	200
14	(Switzerland) Mélanie Meillard	36	3	15	12	16	9	22	45	9	20	DNF2	187
15	(Croatia) Leona Popović	26	80	1	32	DSQ1	24	DNF1	DNF1	6	14	DNF2	183
16	(Norway) Mina Fürst Holtmann	11	45	DSQ1	32	DNF1	DSQ1	DNQ	DNF1	11	DNF1	80	179
17	(Austria) Katharina Gallhuber	20	9	10	50	36	13	DNF1	DNQ	DNF1	24	DNF2	162
18	(Slovenia) Neja Dvornik	DNQ	DNQ	13	11	8	DNQ	DNQ	26	22	29	50	159
19	(Latvia) Dženifera Ģērmane	DNS				9	22	32	32	DNF1	32	18	145
20	(Italy) Martina Peterlini	14	22	DNQ	DNF1	DNQ	DNQ	20	22	4	5	29	116
21	(Switzerland) Wendy Holdener	22	32	60	DNS								114
	(Slovenia) Andreja Slokar	DNF1	DNQ	36	26	14	18	DNF2	DNF1	7	13	DNF2	114
23	(Czech Republic) Martina Dubovská	18	15	5	7	DNQ	10	DNQ	18	DNQ	16	24	113
24	(France) Chiara Pogneaux	7	20	DNQ	DNQ	7	32	DNQ	18	26	DNQ	0	110
25	(Albania) Lara Colturi	9	6	6	DNQ	DNQ	20	29	DNF2	8	8	0	86
26	(Canada) Laurence St. Germain	DNQ	36	18	DNS				9	12	9	NE	84
27	(Switzerland) Nicole Good	DNQ	10	DNQ	8	29	7	7	DNF1	18	DNQ	NE	79
28	(Slovenia) Ana Bucik	DNF1	13	11	DNF2	13	DNF2	12	20	DNF2	10	NE	79
29	(Austria) Franziska Gritsch	DNF1	5	9	24	20	14	DNQ	DNQ	DNQ	DNQ	NE	72
30	(Italy) Marta Rossetti	DNQ	DNQ	45	DNF2	DNF2	DNF1	DNF1	DNF2	22	DNQ	NE	67
31	(United States) AJ Hurt	DSQ1	DNQ	DNF1	6	DNF1	60	DNF2	DNF2	DNF2	DNQ	NE	66
32	(Canada) Amelia Smart	4	DNQ	DNQ	5	18	15	11	DNQ	DSQ1	11	NE	64
33	(Norway) Thea Louise Stjernesund	8	7	2	20	11	8	6	DNQ	DNQ	DNQ	NE	62
34	(France) Marie Lamure	DNQ	DNQ	DNQ	DNQ	6	16	24	14	DNQ	DNQ	NE	60
35	(Germany) Emma Aicher	DNF2	8	DNF1	DNF1	DNF1	DNF2	DNQ	9	DNF2	36	NE	53
36	(Sweden) Cornelia Öhlund	DNQ	4	DNQ	9	12	DNF1	9	DNF1	18	DNF1	NE	52
37	(Norway) Kristin Lysdahl	DNF1	DNF1	DSQ1	36	15	DNQ	DNQ	DNQ	DNF1	DNQ	NE	51
38	(Sweden) Hanna Aronsson Elfman	DNF2	DNQ	DNS	14	DNF1	DNF1	DNQ	12	14	DNF2	NE	40
39	(France) Marion Chevrier	DNQ	DNQ	8	DNF1	DNQ	DNQ	14	DNQ	10	7	NE	39
40	(Italy) Lara Della Mea	5	DNQ	16	DNF1	10	DNF1	DNQ	DNF1	DNQ	6	NE	37
41	(Switzerland) Elena Stoffel	DNQ	DNQ	DNQ	15	DNQ	DNQ	8	11	DNQ	DNQ	NE	34
42	(Austria) Marie-Therese Sporer	DNF1	20	DNQ	DNQ	DNQ	DNQ	13	DNQ	DNQ	DNS	NE	33
	(Norway) Bianca Bakke Westhoff	DNQ	14	13	DNQ	3	DNF2	DNF1	DNF1	DNS	3	NE	33
44	(Sweden) Estelle Alphand	0	12	DNF1	DNF1	DNQ	DNS	15	DNQ	DNF1	DNF1	NE	27
45	(Norway) Andrine Mårstøl	DNS			DNQ	DNS		26	DNQ	DNQ	DNQ	NE	26
46	(Norway) Maria Therese Tviberg	24	DNF1	DNS								NE	24
47	(France) Clarisse Brèche	DNQ	DNF1	DNQ	10	DNQ	6	DNF1	5	DNQ	DNS	NE	21
48	(Germany) Jessica Hilzinger	DNF1	DNQ	DNQ	DNQ	DNQ	11	DNQ	DNS	5	DNQ	NE	16
49	(Italy) Vera Tschurtschenthaler	DNF1	DNQ	DNS	DNF1	DNQ	DNQ	DNF1	DNQ	13	DNQ	NE	13
50	(Austria) Lisa Hörhager	DNQ	DNF1	DNQ	DNQ	DNQ	DNS	DNQ	10	DNF1	DNQ	NE	10
	(Italy) Lucrezia Lorenzi	DNQ	DNF1	DNS	DNQ	DNQ	DNF1	10	DNQ	DNQ	DNQ	NE	10
52	(Australia) Madison Hoffman	6	DNQ	DNS	DNQ	DNF1	DNF1	DNF1	DNF1	DNS		NE	6
53	(France) Caitlin McFarlane	DNS			DNF1	5	DNQ	DNF2	DNF1	DSQ1	DNS	NE	5
54	(Japan) Asa Ando	DNQ	DNQ	4	DNF1	DNQ	DNS					NE	4
	(Italy) Federica Brignone	DNS				DNF1	DNS				4	DNS	4
	(United States) Lila Lapanja	DNQ	DNQ	DNS				DNF1	4	DNF1	DNQ	NE	4
57	(Austria) Stephanie Brunner	DNQ	DNQ	3	DNQ	DNF1	DNS					NE	3
58	(Liechtenstein) Charlotte Lingg	DNF1	2	DNS	DNQ	DNS		DNQ	DNS	DNF1	DNS	NE	2
	References												

=== Legend ===
- Winner (100 points)
- 2nd place (80 points)
- 3rd place (60 points)
- DNQ = Did not qualify for run 2
- DNF1 = Did not finish run 1
- DSQ1 = Disqualified run 1
- DNF2 = Did not finish run 2
- DSQ2 = Disqualified run 2
- DNS2 = Did not start run 2
- Did not start (DNS)
- Not eligible for finals (NE)
- Race canceled (x)
- Updated on 16 March 2024, after all events.

== See also ==
- 2024 Alpine Skiing World Cup – Women's summary rankings
- 2024 Alpine Skiing World Cup – Women's overall
- 2024 Alpine Skiing World Cup – Women's downhill
- 2024 Alpine Skiing World Cup – Women's super-G
- 2024 Alpine Skiing World Cup – Women's giant slalom
- World Cup scoring system
