= Alban Elezi Cannaferina =

French alpine skier (born 2003)

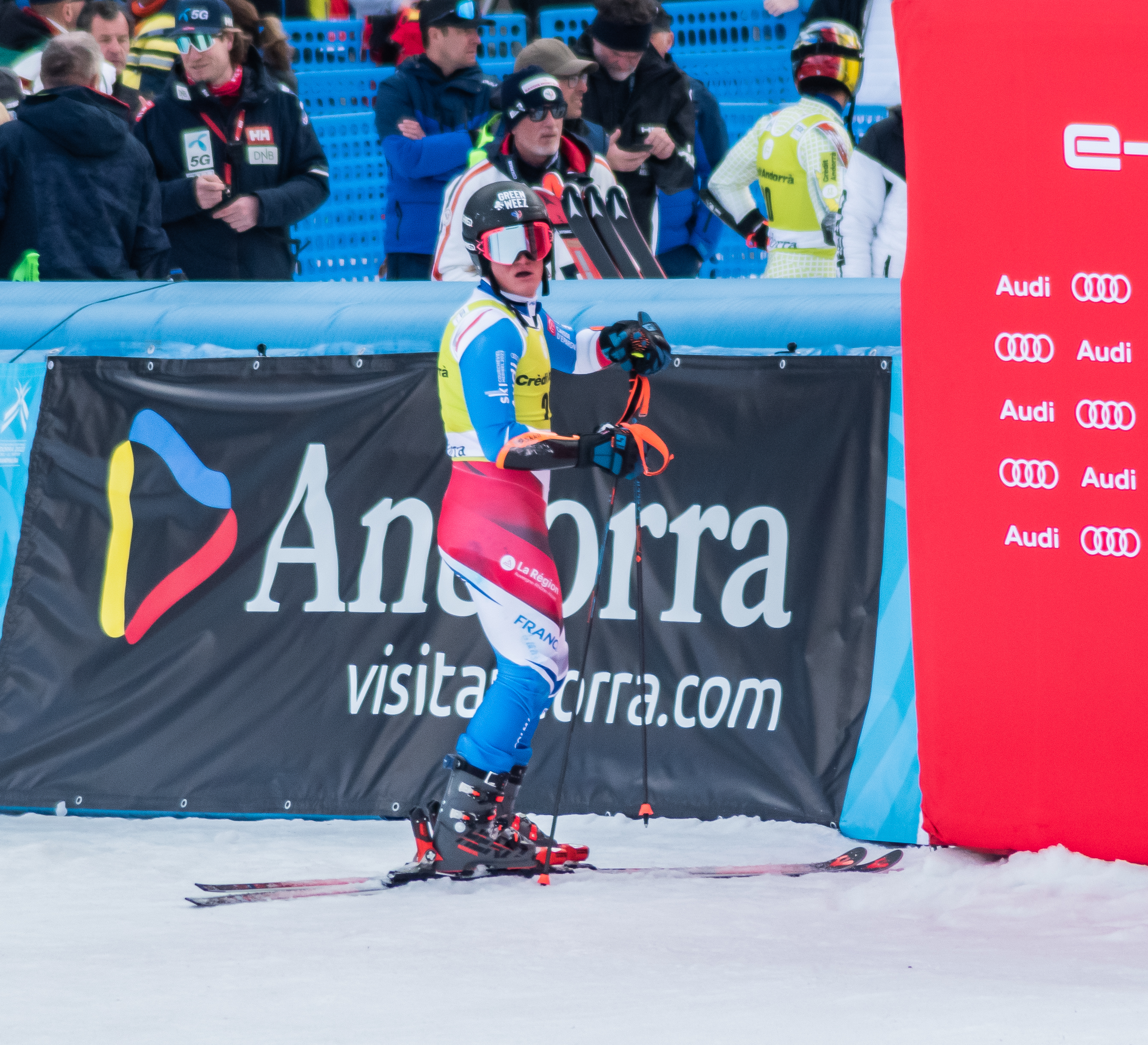
- Elezi Cannaferina in 2023

Personal information
- Born: 15 August 2003 (age 23) Lyon, Rhône, France

Skiing career
- Country: France
- Sport: Alpine skiing
- Club: CS Courchevel
- Disciplines: Downhill, super-G, giant slalom
- World Cup debut: 18 March 2023 (age 19)

Olympics
- Teams: 1 – (2026)
- Medals: 0

World Championships
- Teams: 1 – (2023)
- Medals: 0

World Cup
- Seasons: 3 – (2023, 2025–2026)
- Wins: 0
- Podiums: 1 – (1 GS)
- Overall titles: 0 – (49th in 2026)
- Discipline titles: 0 – (21st in GS, 2026)
Medal record
Junior World Championships
Gold medal – first place	2023 St. Anton	Giant slalom
Silver medal – second place	2023 St. Anton	Downhill
Silver medal – second place	2024 Haute-Savoie	Team combined
Silver medal – second place	2024 Haute-Savoie	Giant slalom

Alban Elezi Cannaferina (born 15 August 2003) is a French World Cup alpine ski racer, competing in the disciplines of giant slalom, super-G, and downhill. He is the 2023 Junior World Champion in giant slalom and represented France at the 2023 World Championships and 2026 Winter Olympics.

== Family and early life ==
Born in Lyon, Elezi Cannaferina is the son of former wrestlers Adnan Elezi and Agnès Canna-Ferina. His father is ethnically Albanian and won a silver medal representing Yugoslavia at the 1983 Mediterranean Games. He moved to France from Skopje, Yugoslavia (now North Macedonia), in 1992. In addition to winning a bronze medal at the 1993 European Wrestling Championships – while being coached by Alban's father – Alban's mother was a ski instructor, and young Alban started skiing at two years old. He also participated in judo, football, and rugby while growing up. His favorite skiers were Alexis Pinturault, Marcel Hirscher, and Ted Ligety.

== Career ==
Elezi Cannaferina started competing in international races in November 2019 at age 16 and made his debut on the Europa Cup in January 2021. The following season saw his first international victories and a top-thirty finish to earn points on the Europa Cup. He was selected to participate in the 2022 Junior World Championships, held at Panorama in southeastern British Columbia, Canada, where he raced in all five men's events, plus the mixed team event. His best finish was a fourth place in the slalom.

The next year he returned to the Junior World Championships in St Anton, Austria. He took the silver medal in the downhill, then won gold in the giant slalom. His junior world championship earned him a chance to compete in the giant slalom and team parallel giant slalom at the senior World Championships held in his home country the next month. The championship also granted him a spot in the giant slalom at the 2023 World Cup season finals in March to mark his World Cup debut.

He took home two more silver medals – in giant slalom and the team combined event (paired with Antoine Azzolin) – in his third and final Junior World Championships appearance in January‍–‍February 2024. The 2023‍–‍24 season lacked other highlights, however, with no finishes higher than fourteenth on the Europa Cup. Over the summer, he decided to stop competing in slalom, saying, "This allows me to focus on giant slalom and speed events, where I feel more comfortable."

Elezi Cannaferina was one of the top performers during the 2024‍–‍25 Europa Cup season with two victories and six podiums on that tour to finish third in the overall season standings. He also had six starts on the World Cup that season and was able to secure points in two of them.

The 2025‍–‍26 season saw Elezi Cannaferina racing full-time on the World Cup circuit, with starts in giant slalom, super-G and downhill. He had hopes of making the French team for the Winter Olympics in February and put himself in contention with top-thirty finishes in nine of his fifteen events leading up to the final team selection on 26 January, but he was not included when the final seven-man roster was announced. That same day, however, the French men's team was allocated one additional quota for the games, and the World Cup giant slalom in Schladming the next day would prove pivotal in determining which skier would fill that eighth spot. Elezi Cannaferina took full advantage of the opportunity by posting the fastest time for the second run, resulting in a third-place finish and his first World Cup podium. This performance and his two top-fifteen finishes the weekend prior in Kitzbühel meant he was likely to be selected for the team, which he said was "a childhood dream come true". Elezi Cannaferina was officially added to the French selection on 29 January. Once at the Olympics (with the men's alpine skiing events held on the Stelvio course in Bormio, Italy), Elezi Cannaferina competed in the dowhnhill, super-G, and giant slalom. His best finish was fifteenth in the super-G.

== World Cup results ==
=== Season standings ===
Season
Season	Age	Overall	Slalom	Giant slalom	Super-G	Downhill
2025	21	108	—	34	—	—
2026	22	49	—	21	30	41

=== Race podiums ===
- 0 wins
- 1 podium (1 GS), 1 top ten

Season
Season	Date	Location	Discipline	Place
2026	27 January 2026	Schladming, Austria	Giant slalom	3rd

== World Championship results ==
Year
Year	Age	Slalom	Giant slalom	Super-G	Downhill	Combined	Team event
2023	18	—	27	—	—	—	7

== Olympic results ==
Year
Year	Age	Slalom	Giant slalom	Super-G	Downhill	Team combined
2026	22	—	DNF2	15	27	—
