= Marie Lamure =

French alpine skier (born 2001)

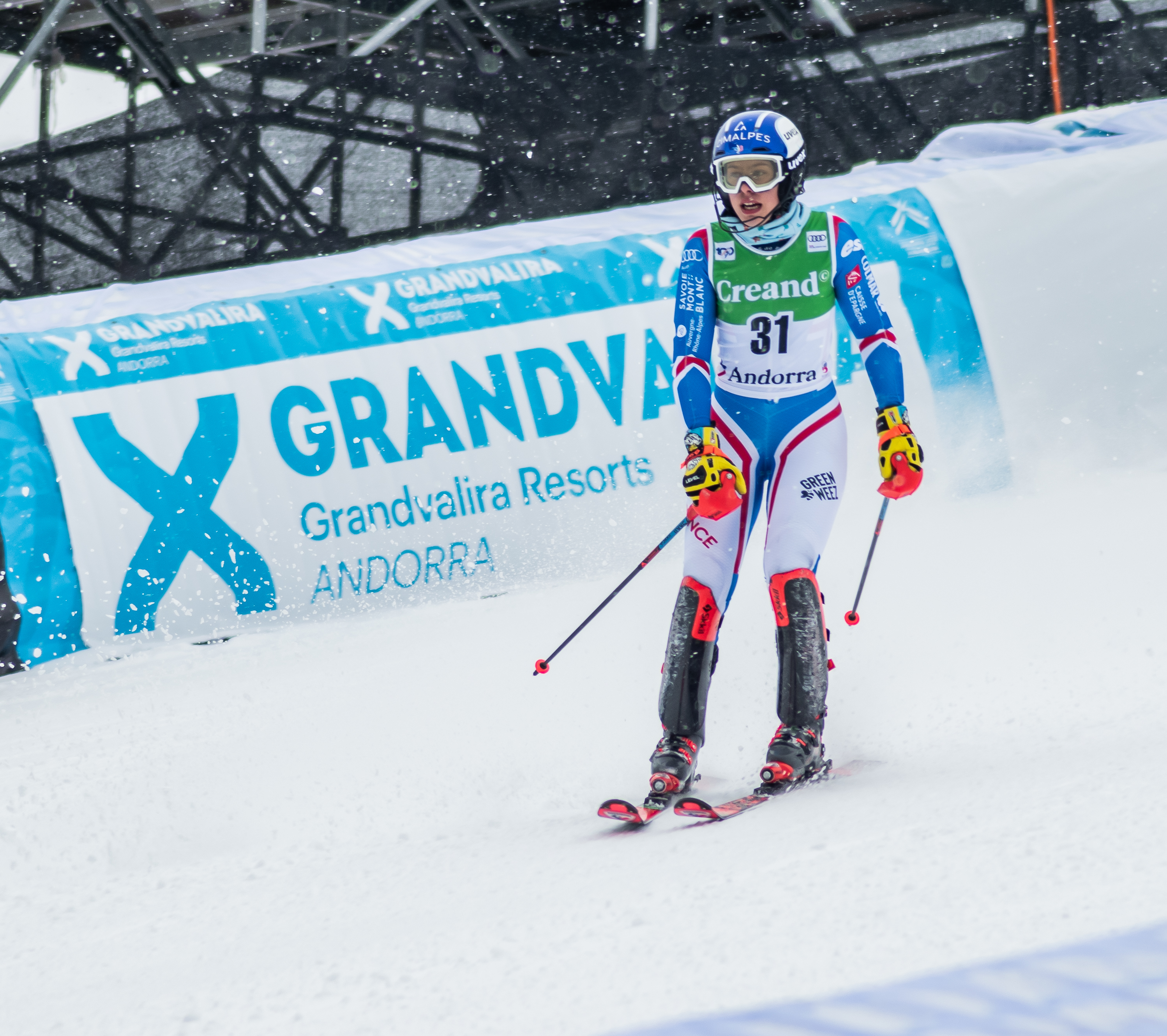
- Lamure in 2024

Personal information
- Born: 14 July 2001 (age 25) Chambéry, Savoie, France

Skiing career
- Country: France
- Sport: Alpine skiing
- Club: Club des Sports Courchevel
- Disciplines: Slalom
- World Cup debut: 29 December 2019 (age 18)

Olympics
- Teams: 1 – (2026)
- Medals: 0

World Championships
- Teams: 2 – (2023, 2025)
- Medals: 0

World Cup
- Seasons: 6 – (2020, 2022–2026)
- Podiums: 0
- Overall titles: 0 – (58th in 2025)
- Discipline titles: 0 – (19th in SL, 2025)
Medal record
Women's alpine skiing
Representing France
Junior World Championships
Gold medal – first place	2022 Panorama	Combined

Marie Lamure (born 14 July 2001 in Chambéry) is a French World Cup alpine ski racer who specializes in slalom. She competed for France at the 2026 Winter Olympics.

Lamure won the gold medal in the women's combined race at the World Junior Alpine Skiing Championships 2022.

== World Cup results ==
=== Season standings ===
Season
Season	Age	Overall	Slalom	Giant slalom	Super-G	Downhill
2023	21	91	38	—	—	—
2024	22	76	34	—	—	—
2025	23	58	19	—	—	—
2026	24	72	24	—	—	—

=== Top-ten finishes ===
- 0 podiums; 1 top ten

Season
Season	Date	Location	Discipline	Place
2025	5 January 2025	Kranjska Gora, Slovenia	Slalom	10th

== World Championship results ==
Year
Year	Age	Slalom	Giant slalom	Super-G	Downhill	Combined	Team combined	Parallel	Team event
2023	21	16	—	—	—	—	—N/a	4	–
2025	23	12	—	—	—	—N/a	13	—N/a	8

== Olympics results ==
Year
Year	Age	Slalom	Giant slalom	Super-G	Downhill	Team combined
2026	24	15	—	—	—	DNF2
