= Martina Peterlini =

Italian alpine skier (born 1997)

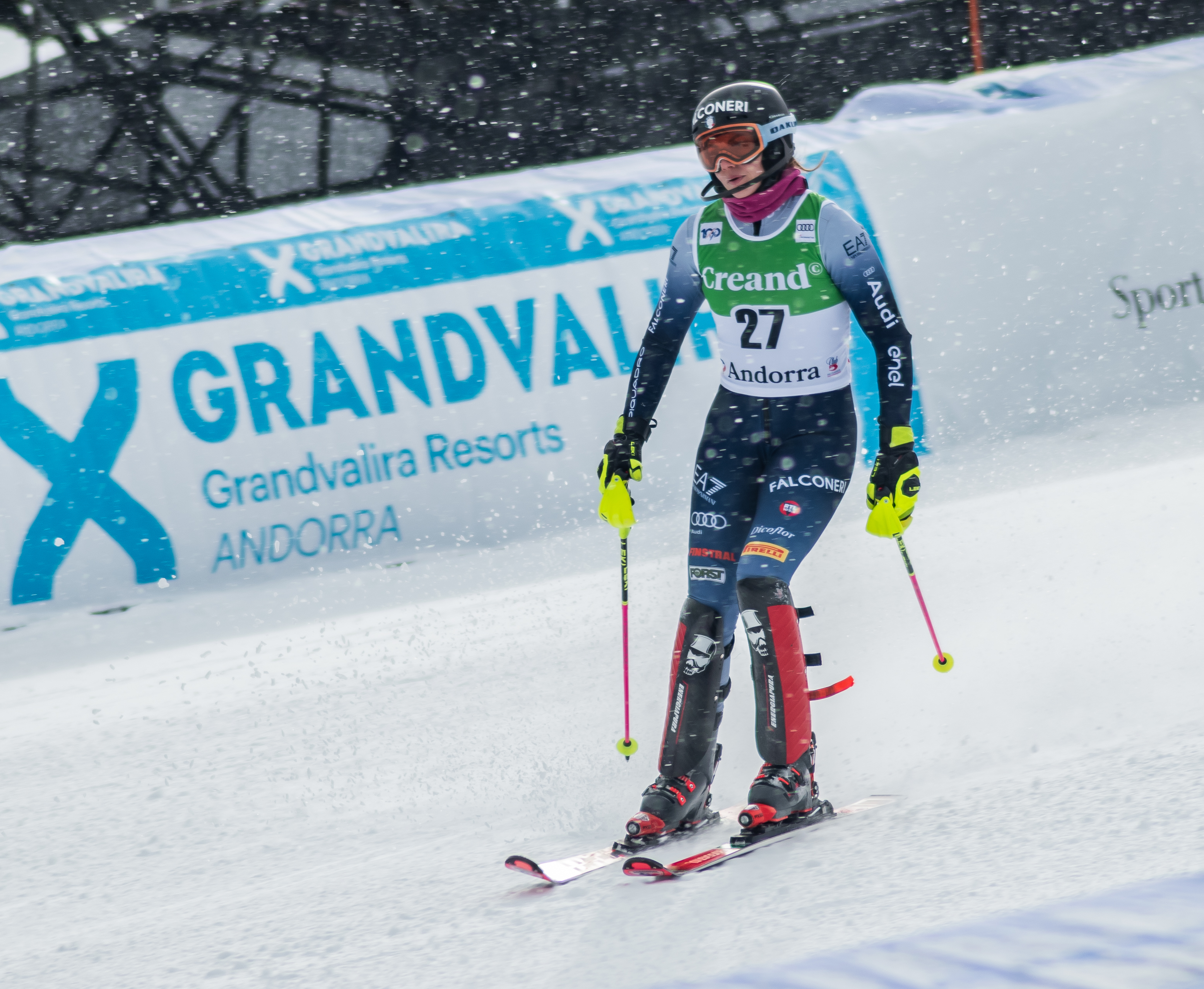
- At Soldeu in 2024

Personal information
- Born: 24 October 1997 (age 28) Rovereto, Trentino, Italy

Skiing career
- Country: Italy
- Sport: Alpine skiing
- Club: G.S. Fiamme Oro
- Disciplines: Slalom
- World Cup debut: 9 January 2018 (age 20)

Olympics
- Teams: 1 – (2026)
- Medals: 0

World Championships
- Teams: 2 – (2021, 2025)
- Medals: 0

World Cup
- Seasons: 9 – (2018–2026)
- Podiums: 0
- Overall titles: 0 – (60th in 2024)
- Discipline titles: 0 – (20th in SL, 2024)

Martina Peterlini (born 24 October 1997) is an Italian World Cup alpine ski racer and specializes in slalom. She represented Italy at the 2026 Winter Olympics.

== World Cup results ==
=== Season standings ===
Season
Season	Age	Overall	Slalom	Giant slalom	Super-G	Downhill	Combined	Parallel
2020	22	83	29	—	—	—	—	—
2021	23	72	28	—	—	—	—N/a	—
2022	24	100	37	—	—	—	—N/a	—
2023	25	—	—	—	—	—	—N/a	—N/a
2024	26	60	20	—	—	—	—N/a	—N/a
2025	27	63	23	—	—	—	—N/a	—N/a
2026	28	75	25	—	—	—	—N/a	—N/a

=== Top-ten results ===
- 0 podiums, 3 top tens

Season
Season	Date	Location	Discipline	Place
2021	6 March 2021	Jasná, Slovakia	Slalom	7th
2024	16 March 2024	Semmering, Austria	Slalom	9th
2026	4 January 2026	Kranjska Gora, Slovenia	Slalom	10th

== World Championship results ==
Year
Year	Age	Slalom	Giant slalom	Super-G	Downhill	Combined	Team combined	Parallel	Team event
2021	23	19	—	—	—	—	—N/a	—	—
2025	27	22	—	—	—	—N/a	14	—N/a	—

== Olympic results ==
Year
Year	Age	Slalom	Giant slalom	Super-G	Downhill	Team combined
2026	28	13	—	—	—	DNF2
