= Stefanie Grob =

Swiss alpine skier (born 2004)

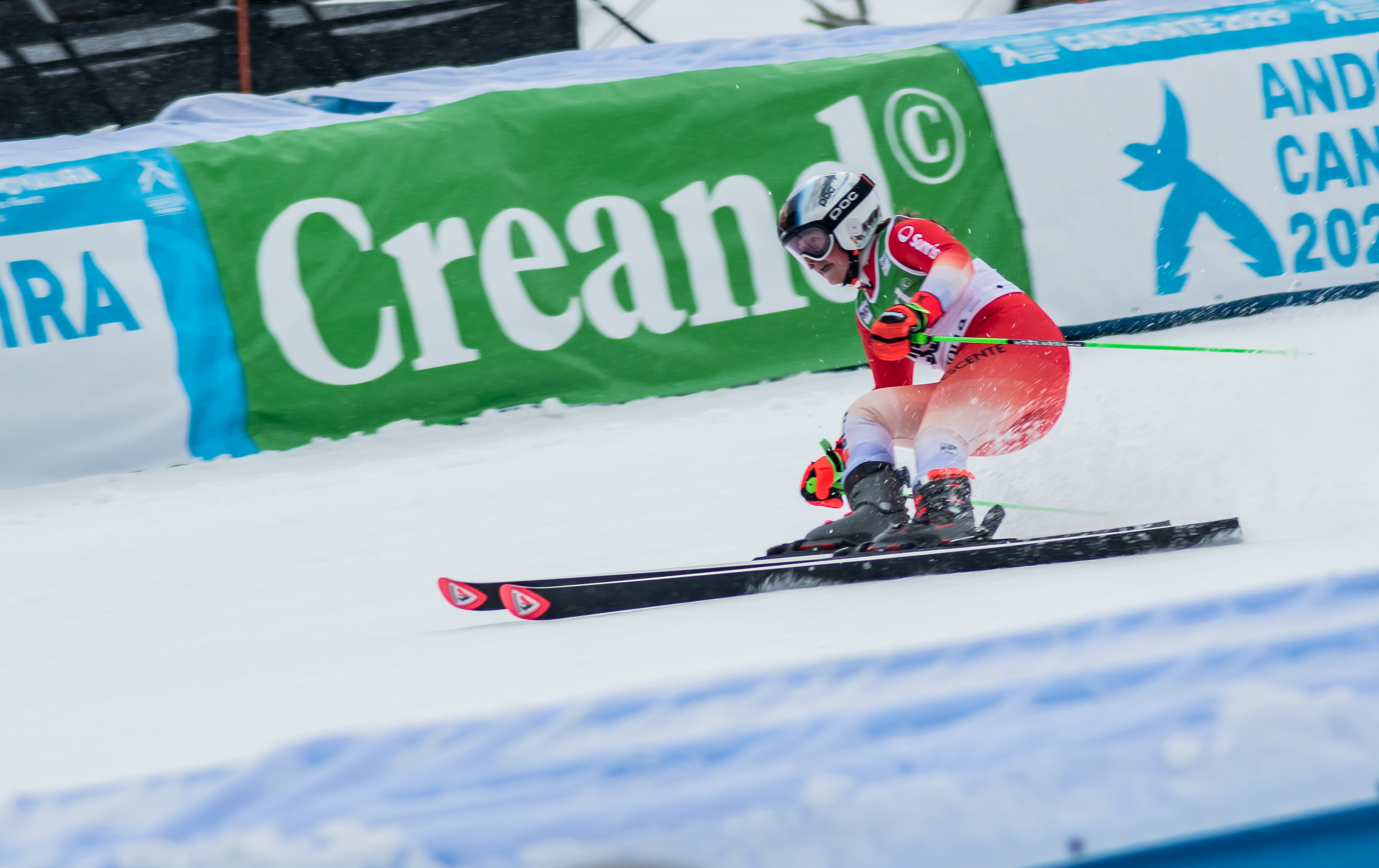
- Stefanie Grob in 2024 in Soldeu

Personal information
- Born: 3 April 2004 (age 22) Weissbad, Switzerland
- Height: 1.58 m (5 ft 2 in)
- Website: stefanie-grob.ch

Skiing career
- Country: Switzerland
- Sport: Alpine skiing
- Club: Brülisau-Weissbad
- Disciplines: Downhill, super-G, giant slalom
- World Cup debut: 27 December 2022 (age 18)

World Cup
- Seasons: 4 – (2023–2026)
- Podiums: 0
- Overall titles: 0 – (70th in 2026)
- Discipline titles: 0 – (31st in SG, 2026)
Medal record
Women's alpine skiing
Representing Switzerland
International competitions: Event / 1st / 2nd / 3rd; Junior World Championships / 2 / 4 / 1
Junior World Championships
Gold medal – first place	2023 St. Anton	Downhill
Gold medal – first place	2025 Tarvisio	Downhill
Silver medal – second place	2023 St. Anton	Super-G
Silver medal – second place	2023 St. Anton	Giant slalom
Silver medal – second place	2024 Haute-Savoie	Giant slalom
Silver medal – second place	2025 Tarvisio	Giant slalom
Bronze medal – third place	2024 Haute-Savoie	Team combined

Stefanie Grob (born 3 April 2004) is a Swiss World Cup alpine skier who competes in the disciplines of downhill, super-G, and giant slalom. She is a two-time junior world champion in the downhill, winning that event in 2023 and 2025.

== Career ==
Grob made her World Cup debut in December 2022 in Semmering, Austria. Despite winning seven medals – including two golds in downhill – over three Junior World Championships (2023–2025), she could not break into the top 30 to earn points in any of her first 27 starts on the top tour. Her breakthrough came when she took 26th place in a super-G at Soldeu, Andorra, in February 2026. Grob then proceeded to gain points in each of the next five events, including her first top 10. She also had two wins and two runner-up finishes during the 2025–26 Europa Cup season to finish first in the downhill standings and second overall and secure World Cup placement for the 2027 season.

== World Cup results ==
=== Season standings ===
Season
Season	Age	Overall	Slalom	Giant slalom	Super-G	Downhill
2026	21	70	—	48	31	34

=== Top-ten finishes ===
- 0 podiums; 1 top ten

Season
Season	Date	Location	Discipline	Place
2026	8 March 2026	(Italy) Val di Fassa, Norway	Super-G	10th
