= Cornelia Öhlund =

Swedish alpine skier (born 2005)

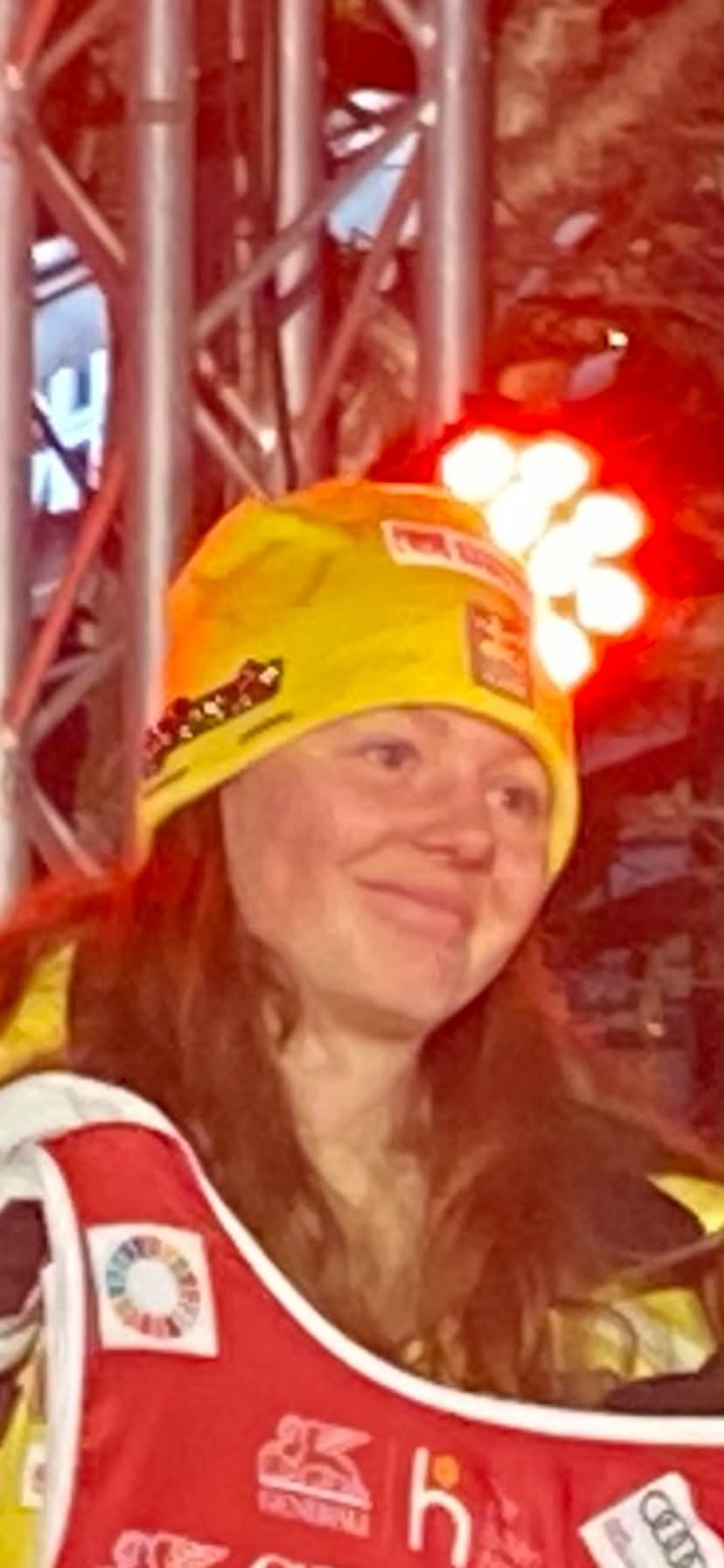
- Öhlund during the slalom bib draw at the World Cup slalom event in Åre, March 2026.

Personal information
- Born: 15 August 2005 (age 20) Stockholm, Sweden

Skiing career
- Country: Sweden
- Sport: Alpine skiing
- Club: Åre SLK
- Disciplines: Slalom
- World Cup debut: 19 November 2022 (age 17)

Olympics
- Teams: 1 – (2026)
- Medals: 0

World Championships
- Teams: 1 – (2025)
- Medals: 0

World Cup
- Seasons: 4 – (2023–2026)
- Podiums: 0
- Overall titles: 0 – (43rd in 2026)
- Discipline titles: 0 – (12th in SL, 2026)
Medal record
Junior World Championships
Gold medal – first place	2023 St Anton	Team Parallel
Gold medal – first place	2025 Tarvisio	Slalom
Silver medal – second place	2024 Port du Soleil	Team Parallel
Bronze medal – third place	2024 Port du Soleil	Slalom

Cornelia Öhlund (born 15 August 2005) is a Swedish World Cup alpine ski racer, who specialises in slalom and giant slalom. She made her World Cup debut at age seventeen in November 2022 and is the 2025 Junior World Champion in slalom.

== World Cup results ==
=== Season standings ===
Season
Season	Age	Overall	Slalom	Giant slalom	Super-G	Downhill
2023	17	86	36	—	—	—
2024	18	79	36	—	—	—
2025	19	46	16	—	—	—
2026	20	43	12	—	—	—

=== Top-ten finishes ===
- 0 podiums, 5 top tens

Season
Season	Date	Location	Discipline	Place
2023	11 March 2023	Åre, Sweden	Slalom	10th
2025	23 February 2025	Sestriere, Italy	Slalom	5th
2026	28 December 2025	Semmering, Austria	Slalom	7th
2026	25 January 2026	Špindlerův Mlýn, Czech Republic	Slalom	7th
2026	15 March 2026	Åre, Sweden	Slalom	7th

== World Championship results ==
Year
Year	Age	Slalom	Giant slalom	Super-G	Downhill	Team combined	Team event
2025	19	11	—	—	—	—	—

== Olympic results ==
Year
Year	Age	Slalom	Giant slalom	Super-G	Downhill	Team combined
2026	20	DNF2	—	—	—	—
