= 2023 Alpine Skiing World Cup – Women's slalom =

Alpine ski discipline year standings

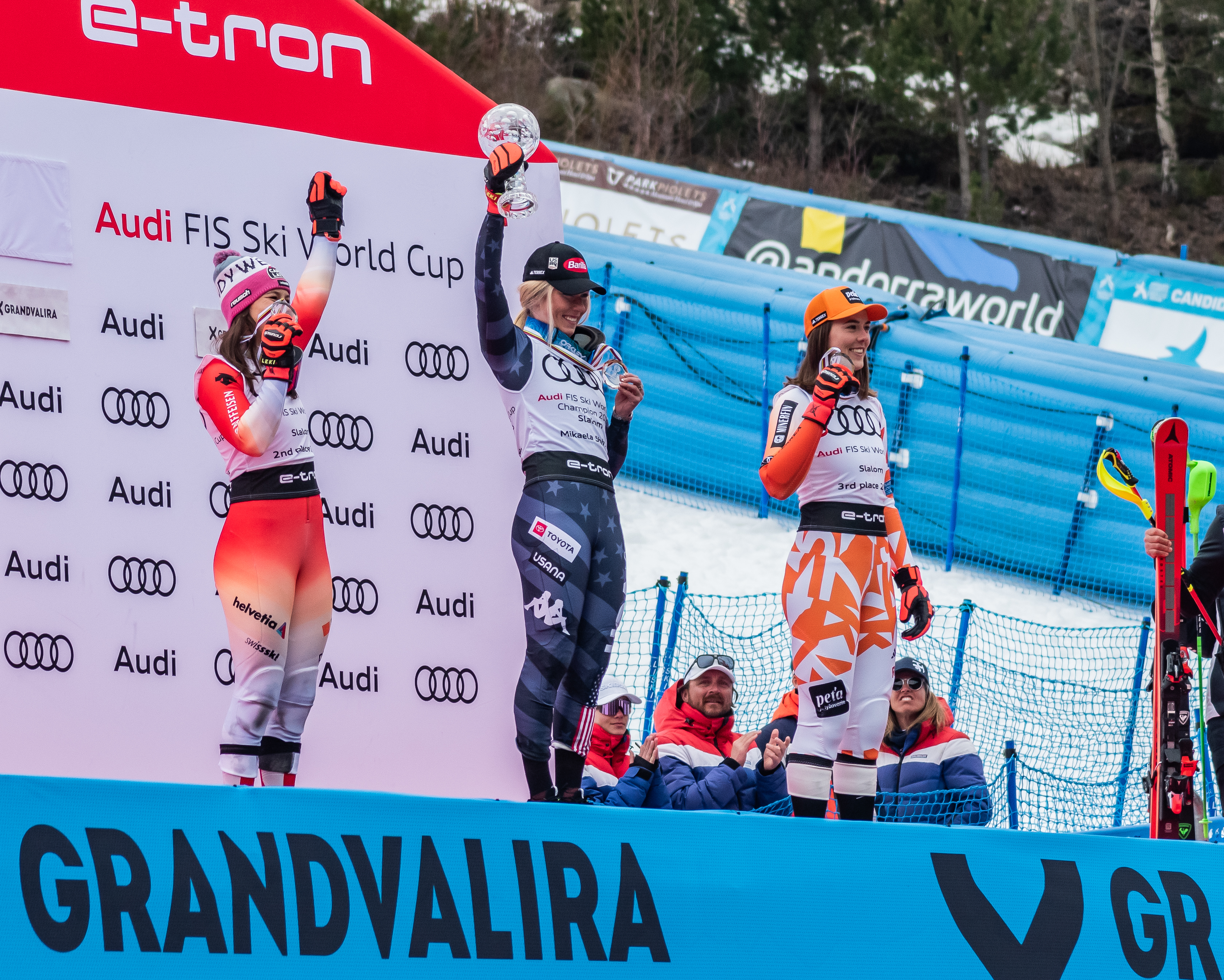
2023 Women's slalom World Cup: 2023 Women's slalom World Cup podium – 1st place: Mikaela Shiffrin (USA), center; 2nd place: Wendy Holdener (SUI), left; 3rd place: Petra Vlhová (SVK), right.; 2023 Women's World Cup; Overall • Downhill • Super-G; Giant slalom • Slalom
Previous: 2022	Next: 2024

The women's slalom in the 2023 FIS Alpine Skiing World Cup consisted of eleven events, including the final. The original schedule also called for eleven events, but a night slalom at Zagreb on 5 January was cancelled due to high winds and warm weather and not immediately rescheduled. However, a week later (12 January), the race was rescheduled as a second slalom at Špindlerův Mlýn on 28 January, accompanied by a shift of the giant slalom scheduled there that day to Kronplatz on 25 January.

The season was interrupted by the FIS Alpine World Ski Championships 2023 in the linked resorts of Courchevel and Méribel, France from 6–19 February 2023. Although the Alpine Skiing branch of the International Ski Federation (FIS) conducts both the World Cup and the World Championships, the World Championships are organized by nation (a maximum of four skiers is generally permitted per nation), and (after 1970) the results count only for World Championship medals, not for World Cup points. Accordingly, the results in the World Championship are highlighted in blue and shown in this table by ordinal position only in each discipline. The women's slalom was held in Méribel on 18 February.

== Season summary ==
After setting an all-time World Cup record by finishing in the top 3 in a discipline 30 times without ever recording a race win in that discipline, Wendy Holdener of Switzerland won both the third and fourth slaloms of the year to finally end that streak.

However, after the first 8 races, Mikaela Shiffrin of the United States, who had won five of them and finished second in two others, led the season standings by 175 points. Holdener was in second place, and defending discipline champion Petra Vlhová of Slovakia was 20 points further back in third. In the ninth race, Shiffrin finished second by 0.06 seconds, but she clinched the season title in the discipline with a 255-point lead over Holdener and Vlhová with just two races to go. In the next slalom at Åre, Sweden, Shiffrin's victory was her 87th World Cup victory, surpassing the all-time record of 86 set by Swedish technical specialist Ingemar Stenmark in the 1970s-1980s. Meanwhile, Holdener held off Vhlová by 25 points to claim second.

The World Cup finals in women's slalom took place on Saturday, 18 March 2023, in Soldeu, Andorra, which previously hosted the finals in 2019. Only the top 25 skiers in the World Cup slalom discipline and the winner of the Junior World Championship, plus any skiers who have scored at least 500 points in the World Cup overall classification for the season, were eligible to compete in the final, and only the top 15 earned World Cup points.

== Standings ==
	Venue	19 Nov 2022; Levi	20 Nov 2022; Levi	27 Nov 2022; Killington	11 Dec 2022; Sestriere	29 Dec 2022; Semmering	4 Jan 2023; Zagreb	10 Jan 2023; Flachau	28 Jan 2023; Špindlerův Mlýn	29 Jan 2023; Špindlerův Mlýn	18 Feb 2023; Méribel WC	11 Mar 2023; Åre	18 Mar 2023; Soldeu	
#	Skier	(Finland)	(Finland)	(United States)	(Italy)	(Austria)	(Croatia)	(Austria)	(Czech Republic)	(Czech Republic)	(France)	(Sweden)	(Andorra)	Total
	(United States) Mikaela Shiffrin	100	100	45	80	100	100	80	100	80	②	100	60	945
2	(Switzerland) Wendy Holdener	45	80	100	100	45	50	50	60	DNQ	DNF2	80	45	655
3	(Slovakia) Petra Vlhová	60	60	50	60	50	80	100	50	20	⑤	DNF2	100	630
4	(Germany) Lena Dürr	50	50	3	32	60	DNQ	60	80	100	③	40	18	493
5	(Sweden) Anna Swenn-Larsson	80	DNF1	100	40	40	60	DNF2	40	50	DNF2	60	DNF2	470
6	(Croatia) Leona Popović	26	40	29	13	22	26	DNF2	36	45	⑰	32	80	349
7	(United States) Paula Moltzan	DNF1	DNF2	DNQ	45	80	DNF1	45	45	32	DNS	50	0	297
8	(Slovenia) Ana Bucik	40	20	36	22	32	45	DNF1	26	9	⑨	29	DNF2	259
9	(Sweden) Sara Hector	36	45	26	DNQ	24	DNF1	DNF2	20	22	⑦	20	50	243
10	(Sweden) Hanna Aronsson Elfman	29	24	24	50	29	DNF2	36	32	DNF1	⑩	DNF2	16	240
11	(Austria) Katharina Truppe	16	10	60	14	20	DNF2	22	24	16	⑱	14	26	222
12	(Croatia) Zrinka Ljutić	DNF2	36	16	36	40	DNF1	DNF2	2	60	DNF2	DNF1	DNF1	190
13	(Austria) Franziska Gritsch	6	DNQ	32	DNF1	18	36	11	29	40	⑬	DNF1	DNF2	172
14	(Norway) Thea Louise Stjernesund	32	26	20	DNQ	DNQ	20	26	11	DNQ	⑬	6	29	170
15	(Czech Republic) Martina Dubovská	20	13	9	26	26	DNF1	DNF1	10	13	DNS2	15	36	168
16	(Canada) Laurence St. Germain	DNQ	29	DNQ	5	DNF1	18	9	16	36	①	45	DNF2	158
17	(Canada) Ali Nullmeyer	18	14	18	24	15	DNF2	24	12	DNQ	⑫	9	22	156
18	(Switzerland) Michelle Gisin	DNF1	15	5	7	11	10	18	13	29	DNS2	13	32	153
19	(Austria) Katharina Liensberger	24	32	DNF2	18	DNQ	0	40	9	5	⑳	10	DNF2	138
20	(Germany) Jessica Hilzinger	15	DNQ	DSQ1	DNS	9	16	32	DNQ	10	DNF2	11	40	133
21	(Norway) Mina Fürst Holtmann	24	22	6	29	0	DNF2	DNF1	4	4	④	18	20	127
22	(Canada) Amelia Smart	4	DNQ	15	DNQ	16	32	14	1	11	㉔	DNQ	24	117
23	(Germany) Emma Aicher	DNQ	DNQ	DNQ	DNS	12	24	29	3	18	㉑	24	DNF1	110
24	(Norway) Maria Therese Tviberg	DNF1	DNF2	40	2	3	32	DNF1	DNF1	26	DNS2	DNF2	DNF1	103
25	(Switzerland) Camille Rast	9	DNQ	8	DNQ	7	40	12	6	8	㉗	7	DNF1	97
26	(Switzerland) Elena Stoffel	DNQ	DNQ	11	15	DNQ	16	16	15	6	DNS	16	DNF2	95
27	(France) Nastasia Noens	5	DNQ	22	DNQ	13	22	13	5	DNQ	⑮	DNQ	NE	80
28	(Switzerland) Mélanie Meillard	DNF1	DNQ	14	DNQ	DNQ	13	DNF2	DNQ	7	DNS	36	NE	70
29	(Switzerland) Nicole Good	DNF1	12	DNS	11	DNQ	DNQ	DNQ	22	DNQ	DNS	22	NE	67
30	(Austria) Katharina Huber	12	DNQ	DNF1	DNF1	8	DNF2	15	7	24	⑪	DNQ	NE	66
31	(Switzerland) Aline Danioth	13	3	DNF1	20	5	DNF2	20	DNF1	3	⑥	DNS	NE	64
	(Slovenia) Neja Dvornik	8	16	12	DNF1	DNF1	14	DNF1	14	DNQ	㉑	DNQ	NE	64
	(Germany) Andrea Filser	7	20	4	16	6	9	DNF2	DNQ	2	㉜	DNQ	NE	64
34	(Italy) Marta Rossetti	DNQ	DNQ	13	DNF1	DNQ	12	10	DNQ	14	㉓	12	NE	61
35	(Italy) Anita Gulli	0	8	DNF1	DNF2	DNQ	DNF1	DNQ	18	16	㉟	0	NE	42
36	(Sweden) Cornelia Öhlund	DNQ	9	DNS	DNF1	DNF1	DNQ	DNQ	DNS			26	NE	35
37	(Italy) Lara Della Mea	DNQ	DNQ	DNQ	12	DNQ	DNQ	DNQ	DNQ	12	⑧	DNQ	NE	24
38	(France) Marie Lamure	DNQ	11	DNQ	11	DNQ	DNQ	DNF1	DNQ	DNQ	⑯	DSQ2	NE	22
39	(Austria) Chiara Mair	11	DNF1	10	DNF1	DNF1	DNS						NE	21
40	(Norway) Kristin Lysdahl	DNQ	6	DNF2	DNF1	DNQ	12	DNF1	DNQ	DNQ	⑲	DNQ	NE	18
41	(Japan) Asa Ando	DNQ	DNQ	DNQ	DNF1	DNQ	DNF1	DNQ	8	DNQ	㉘	8	NE	16
42	(United States) Katie Hensien	DNQ	5	DNF1	DNQ	10	DNQ	DNQ	DNQ	DNF1	㉖	DNF1	NE	15
	(Austria) Marie-Therese Sporer	15	DNF1	DNF1	DNQ	DNQ	DNF1	DNQ	DNQ	DNF1	DNS	DNQ	NE	15
44	(Sweden) Moa Boström Müssener	DNQ	DNF1	DNS	DNF1	14	DNF2	DNF1	DNS			DNF1	NE	14
	(United States) Ava Sunshine	10	4	DNF1	DNF1	DNQ	DNF1	DNF1	DNQ	DNQ	DNF2	DNS	NE	14
46	(Italy) Vera Tschurtschenthaler	DNQ	DNQ	DNS	11	DNQ	DNF1	DNF1	DNQ	1	DNS	DNQ	NE	12
47	(France) Clarisse Brèche	DNS			11	DSQ1	DNQ	DNS					NE	11
48	(Italy) Federica Brignone	DNS		7	DNS									7
	(France) Chiara Pogneaux	DSQ1	7	DNS	DNQ	DNQ	DNQ	DNQ	DNS		㉕	DNQ	NE	7
50	(Albania) Lara Colturi	DNQ	DNF1	DNF1	6	DNF1	DNF1	DNF1	DNS				NE	6
51	(Austria) Lisa Hörhager	DNS				4	DNF1	DNF1	DNS			DNF1	NE	4
	(United States) Zoe Zimmermann	DNS	DNF1	DNS	4	DNS	DNQ	DNQ	DNQ	DNF1	DNS		NE	4
53	(United Kingdom) Charlie Guest	DNF2	DNF1	DNQ	DNQ	3	DNS				㉛	DNF1	NE	3
	(Italy) Lucrezia Lorenzi	DNS			3	DNQ	DNS	DNQ	DNS			DNQ	NE	3
	References													

=== Legend ===
- Winner (100 points)
- 2nd place (80 points)
- 3rd place (60 points)
- DNQ = Did not qualify for run 2
- DNF1 = Did not finish run 1
- DSQ1 = Disqualified run 1
- DNF2 = Did not finish run 2
- DSQ2 = Disqualified run 2
- DNS2 = Did not start run 2
- Did not start (DNS)
- Not eligible for finals (NE)
- Race canceled (x)
- FIS non-World Cup race (World Championships)
- Updated at 18 March 2023, after all events.

== See also ==
- 2023 Alpine Skiing World Cup – Women's summary rankings
- 2023 Alpine Skiing World Cup – Women's overall
- 2023 Alpine Skiing World Cup – Women's downhill
- 2023 Alpine Skiing World Cup – Women's super-G
- 2023 Alpine Skiing World Cup – Women's giant slalom
- World Cup scoring system
