= Fabian Ax Swartz =

Swedish alpine skier (born 2004)

Personal information
- Born: 12 February 2004 (age 22) Stockholm, Sweden

Skiing career
- Country: Sweden
- Sport: Alpine skiing
- Club: IFK Lidingö Slalomklubb
- Disciplines: Giant slalom, slalom
- World Cup debut: 18 November 2023 (age 19)

Olympics
- Teams: 1 – (2026)
- Medals: 0

World Championships
- Teams: 1 – (2025)
- Medals: 1 (0 gold)

World Cup
- Seasons: 4 – (2024–2027)
- Podiums: 0
- Overall titles: 0 – (68thin 2026)
- Discipline titles: 0 – (30th in SL, 2026)
Medal record
Men's alpine skiing
Representing Sweden
World Championships
Bronze medal – third place	2025 Saalbach	Team event
Junior World Championships
Silver medal – second place	2022 Invermere	Slalom
Bronze medal – third place	2024 Haute-Savoie	Giant slalom
Bronze medal – third place	2025 Tarvisio	Giant slalom

Fabian Ax Swartz (born 12 February 2004) is a Swedish World Cup alpine ski racer. He represented Sweden at the 2026 Winter Olympics.

== Career ==
In January 2025, Ax Swartz represented Sweden at the FIS Alpine World Ski Championships 2025 and won a bronze medal in the team event. In February, he then competed at the World Junior Alpine Skiing Championships 2025 and won a bronze medal in the giant slalom event with a time of 2:02.41.

In January 2026, he was selected to represent Sweden at the 2026 Winter Olympics.

== World Cup results ==
=== Season standings ===
Season
Season	Age	Overall	Slalom	Giant slalom	Super-G	Downhill
2024	20	123	47	—	—	—
2025	21	101	39	—	—	—
2026	22	68	30	35	—	—

=== Top-fifteen results ===
- 0 podiums, 5 top fifteens

Season
Season	Date	Location	Discipline	Place
2025	23 December 2024	Alta Badia, Italy	Slalom	11th
2026	28 January 2026	Schladming, Austria	Slalom	15th
2026	8 March 2026	Kranjska Gora, Slovenia	Slalom	11th
2027	15 November 2026	Levi, Finland	Slalom	4th
2027	22 November 2026	Gurgl, Austria	Slalom	6th

== World Championship results ==
Year
Year	Age	Slalom	Giant slalom	Super-G	Downhill	Team combined	Team event
2025	21	DNF1	29	—	—	—	3

== Olympic results ==
Year
Year	Age	Slalom	Giant slalom	Super-G	Downhill	Team combined
2026	22	14	22	—	—	—
