= World Junior Alpine Skiing Championships 2025 =

2025 skiing competition

World Junior Alpine Skiing Championships
- Location: Tarvisio, Italy
- Dates: 27 February – 6 March
- Teams: 56

The 2025 World Junior Alpine Skiing Championships were held at Tarvisio in Italy from 27 February to 6 March 2025. It was the sixth time that a World Junior Alpine Skiing Championship was held in Italy after the editions in 1983, 1988, 1993, 2002, 2005, 2012 and 2019.

== Medal summary ==
=== Men's events ===
Event	Gold		Silver		Bronze	
Downhill	Felix Rösle; Germany	1:40.11	Philipp Kälin; Switzerland	1:40.13	Matthias Fernsebner; Austria	1:40.25
Super-G	Benno Brandis; Germany	56.97	Sandro Manser; Switzerland	57.02	Matthias Fernsebner; Austria	57.17
Team Alpine Combined	Thomas Chaix; Jonas Skabar; France	1:39.75	Gabin Janet; Jack Spencer; Switzerland	1:40.04	Stanley Buzek; Hunter Salani; United States	1:40.05
Giant Slalom	Flavio Vitale; France	2:01.16	Rasmus Bakkevig; Norway	2:02.02	Fabian Ax Swartz; Sweden	2:02.41
Slalom	Theodor Brækken; Norway	1:40.70	Gustav Wissting; Sweden	1:41.09	Luca Carrick-Smith; Great Britain	1:41.27

=== Ladies events ===
Event	Gold		Silver		Bronze	
Downhill	Stefanie Grob; Switzerland	1:43.29	Jasmin Mathis; Switzerland	1:43.30	Garance Meyer; France	1:43.58
Super-G	Jasmin Mathis; Switzerland	1:02.30	Leonie Zegg; Austria	1:02.57	Sara Thaler; Italy	1:02.59
Team Alpine Combined	Viktoria Bürgler; Natalie Falch; Austria	2:06.38	Liza Backlund; Moa Landström; Sweden	2:06.91	Emilia Herzgsell; Elena Riederer; Austria	2:07.37
Giant Slalom	Giorgia Collomb; Italy	2:04.72	Stefanie Grob; Switzerland	2:05.28	Elisabeth Bocock; United States	2:05.34
Slalom	Cornelia Öhlund; Sweden	1:28.61	Leonie Raich; Austria	1:28.79	Natalie Falch; Austria	1:28.91

=== Mixed events ===
Event	Gold	Silver	Bronze
Team parallel	June Brand; Arthur Heude; Garance Meyer; Jonas Skabar; France	Alexander Ax Swartz; Liza Backlund; Astrid Hedin; Albin Larsson; Sweden	Elisabeth Bocock; Stanley Buzek; Liv Moritz; Sawyer Reed; United States

=== Medal table ===
* Host nation (Italy)

Rank	Nation	Gold	Silver	Bronze	Total
1	France	3	0	1	4
2	Switzerland	2	5	0	7
3	Germany	2	0	0	2
4	Sweden	1	3	1	5
5	Austria	1	2	4	7
6	Norway	1	1	0	2
7	Italy*	1	0	1	2
8	United States	0	0	3	3
9	Great Britain	0	0	1	1
Totals (9 entries)		11	11	11	33
