= Hanna Aronsson Elfman =

Swedish alpine skier (born 2002)

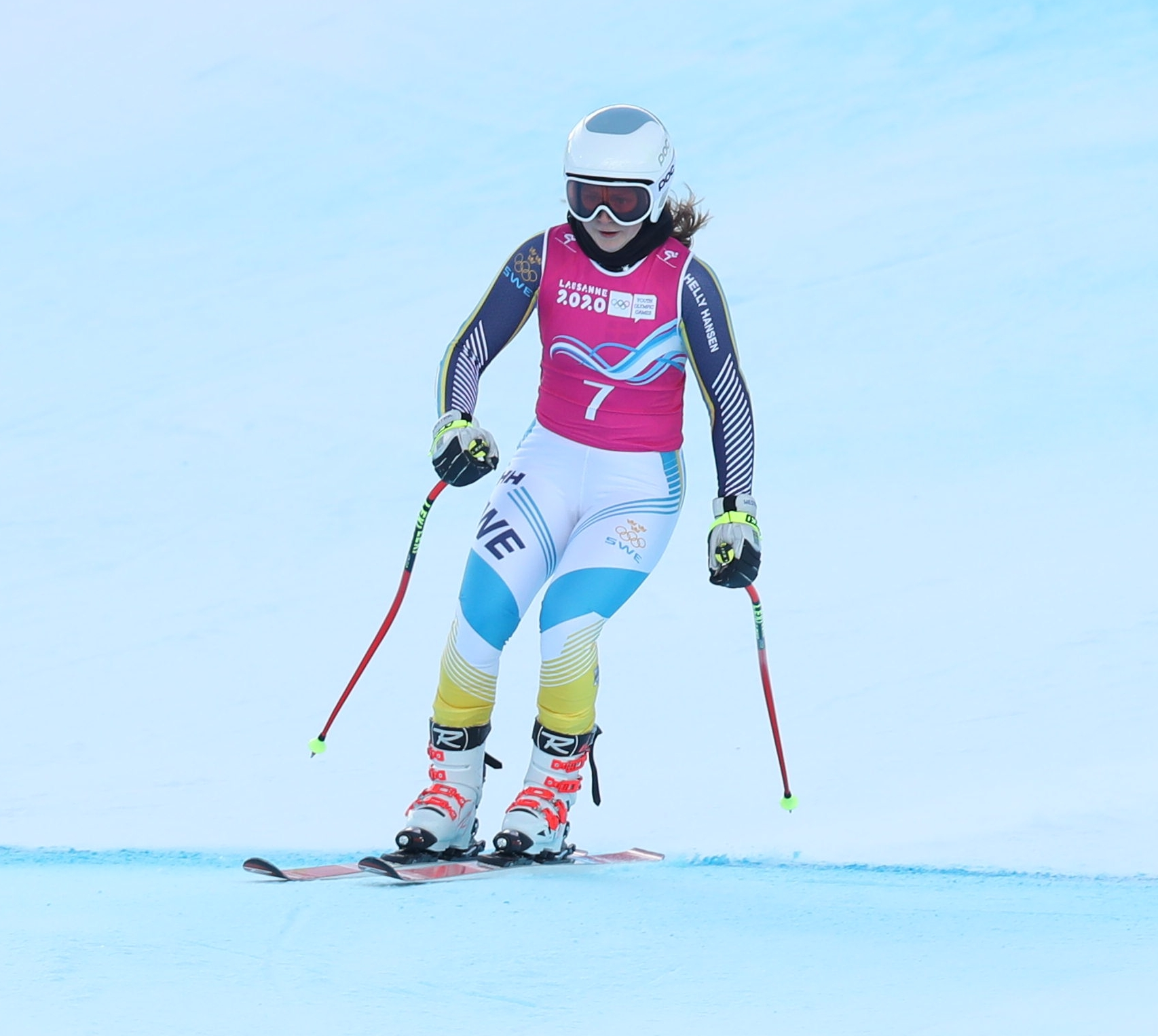
- At the Winter Youth Olympics in Lausanne, Switzerland in January 2020

Personal information
- Full name: Hanna Vilhelmina Aronsson Elfman
- Born: 29 December 2002 (age 23) Karlstad, Sweden
- Family: Marja von Stedingk (aunt)

Skiing career
- Country: Sweden
- Sport: Alpine skiing
- Club: Kils SLK
- Disciplines: Slalom, giant slalom
- World Cup debut: 15 February 2020 (age 17)

Olympics
- Teams: 2 – (2022, 2026)
- Medals: 0

World Championships
- Teams: 2 – (2023, 2025)
- Medals: 0

World Cup
- Seasons: 7 – (2020–2026)
- Podiums: 0
- Overall titles: 0 – (38th in 2023)
- Discipline titles: 0 – (10th in SL, 2023)
Medal record
Junior World Championships
Gold medal – first place	2021 Bansko	Giant slalom
Gold medal – first place	2023 St. Anton	Giant slalom
Gold medal – first place	2023 St. Anton	Slalom

Hanna Vilhelmina Aronsson Elfman (born 29 December 2002) is a Swedish World Cup alpine ski racer, who specialises in the Slalom and giant slalom. She made her World Cup debut at age seventeen in February 2020. She is the 2021 and 2023 Junior World Champion in giant slalom, as well as the 2023 Junior World Champion in slalom. She competed in the 2022 Winter Olympics in Beijing and the 2026 Winter Olympics.

Former Olympic free skier Marja von Stedingk is her maternal aunt.

== World Cup results ==
=== Season standings ===
Season
Season	Age	Overall	Slalom	Giant slalom	Super-G	Downhill	Parallel
2022	19	86	43	44	—	—	—
2023	20	38	10	—	—	—	—N/a
2024	21	86	38	—	—	—	—N/a
2025	22	59	21	—	—	—	—N/a
2026	23	50	17	41	—	—	—N/a

=== Top-ten finishes ===
- 0 podiums; 6 top tens (6 SL)

Season
Season	Date	Location	Discipline	Place
2023	19 November 2022	Levi, Finland	Slalom	9th
2023	11 December 2022	Sestriere, Italy	Slalom	4th
2023	29 December 2022	Semmering, Austria	Slalom	9th
2023	10 January 2023	Flachau, Austria	Slalom	7th
2023	28 January 2023	Špindlerův Mlýn, Czech Republic	Slalom	8th
2026	15 March 2026	Åre, Sweden	Slalom	9th

== World Championship results ==
Year
Year	Age	Slalom	Giant slalom	Super-G	Downhill	Combined	Team combined	Parallel	Team event
2023	20	10	DNF1	—	—	—	—N/a	—	11
2025	22	17	30	—	—	—N/a	—	—N/a	—

== Olympic results ==
Year
Year	Age	Slalom	Giant slalom	Super-G	Downhill	Combined	Team combined	Team event
2022	19	—	DNF2	—	—	—	—N/a	13
2026	23	DNF1	21	—	—	—N/a	—	—N/a
