= Dženifera Ģērmane =

Latvian alpine skier (born 2003)

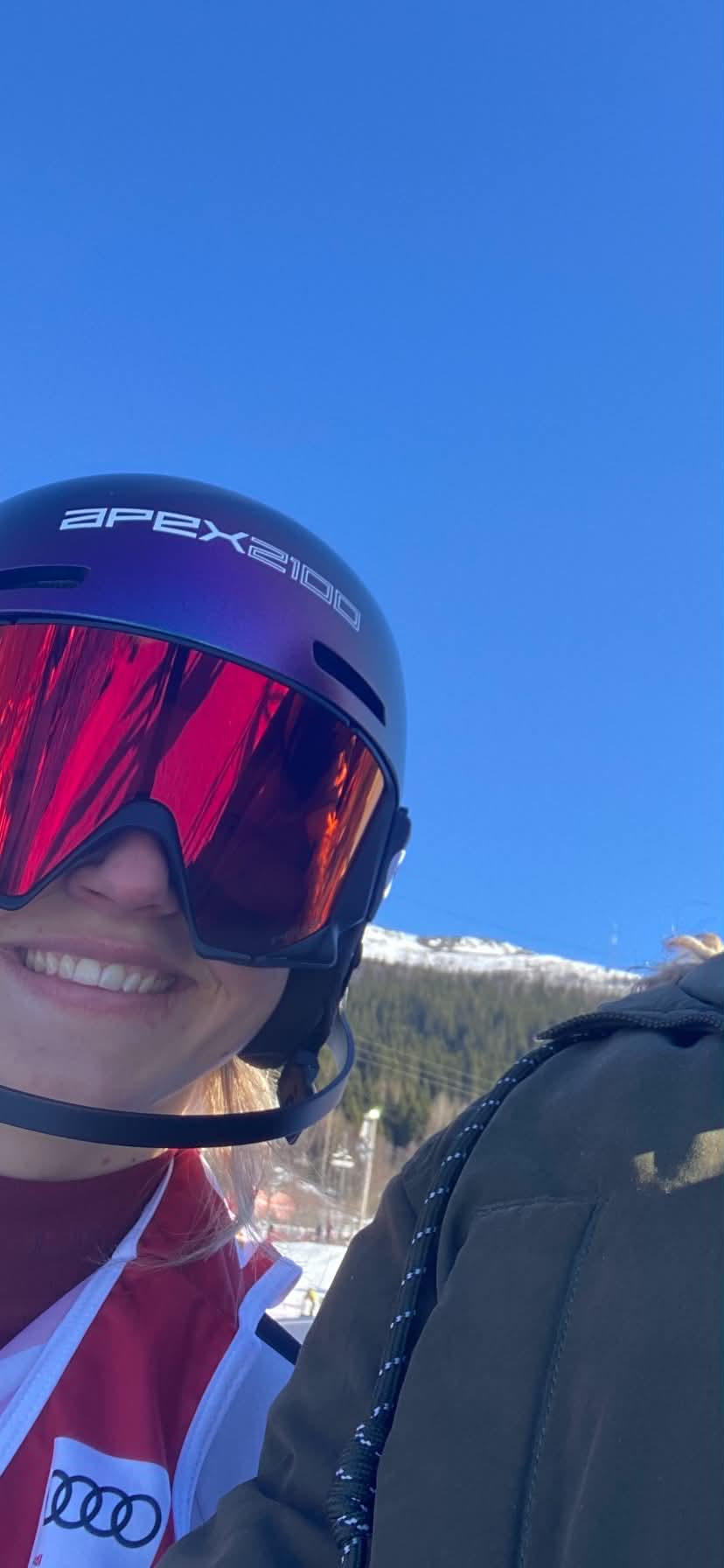
- Ģērmane after the 1st run of the slalom WC event in Åre, March 2026.

Personal information
- Born: 24 March 2003 (age 23) Valmiera, Latvia

Skiing career
- Country: Latvia
- Sport: Alpine skiing
- Disciplines: Slalom, giant slalom
- World Cup debut: 10 January 2023 (age 19)

Olympics
- Teams: 1 – (2026)
- Medals: 0

World Championships
- Teams: 2 – (2021, 2023)
- Medals: 0

World Cup
- Seasons: 4 – (2023–2026)
- Podiums: 0
- Overall titles: 0 – (45th in 2026)
- Discipline titles: 0 – (13th in SL, 2026)
Medal record
Women's alpine skiing
Representing Latvia
Junior World Championships
Gold medal – first place	2024 Port du Soleil	Slalom

Dženifera Ģērmane (born 24 March 2003) is a Latvian World Cup alpine ski racer who specializes in technical events, with a focus on slalom.

== Career ==
Ģērmane won the gold medal in slalom at the Junior World Championships in 2024.

== World Cup results ==
During the 2024 World Cup season, Ģērmane had three finishes in the top ten, all in slalom races. Since then, she has four additional top ten results, with a sixth at Åre, Sweden in the 2026 season as her best placement.

=== Season standings ===
Season
Season	Age	Overall	Slalom	Giant slalom	Super-G	Downhill
2024	20	56	19	—	—	—
2025	21	105	48	—	—	—
2026	22	45	13	—	—	—

=== Top-ten finishes ===
- 0 podiums; 7 top tens

Season
Season	Date	Location	Discipline	Place
2024	16 January 2024	Flachau, Austria	Slalom	8th
2024	21 January 2024	Jasná, Slovakia	Slalom	8th
2024	10 March 2024	Åre, Sweden	Slalom	8th
2026	16 December 2025	Courchevel, France	Slalom	10th
2026	28 December 2025	Semmering, Austria	Slalom	10th
2026	4 January 2026	Kranjska Gora, Slovenia	Slalom	7th
2026	15 March 2026	Åre, Sweden	Slalom	6th

== World Championships results ==
Year
Year	Age	Slalom	Giant slalom	Super-G	Downhill	Combined	Parallel	Team event
2021	17	24	DNF1	—	—	—	—	—
2023	19	29	—	—	—	—	—	—

== Olympic results ==
Year
Year	Age	Slalom	Giant slalom	Super-G	Downhill	Team combined
2026	22	DNF1	—	—	—	—
