= World Junior Alpine Skiing Championships 2023 =

2023 skiing competition

World Junior Alpine Skiing Championships
- Venue: Karl-Schranz-Ski course
- Location: St Anton am Arlberg, Austria
- Dates: 19-25 January
- Teams: 56

The 2023 World Junior Alpine Skiing Championships were held at St Anton am Arlberg Ski Resort in St Anton am Arlberg, Austria from 19 to 25 January 2023. For the first time, the Alpine combined was held as a team event. It was the fourth time that a World Junior Alpine Skiing Championship was held in Austria after the editions in 1986, 1997 and 2007.

The races took place on the Karl-Schranz-Ski course, which also hosted races of the 2001 Alpine Skiing World Championships.

== Schedule ==
The competitive program is as follows (all times CET)

Date	Time	Discipline
19 January	10:30	Women's Downhill
19 January	11:30	Men's Downhill
20 January	9:30	Women's Super G
20 January	10:45	Men's Super G
20 January	13:30	Women's Team Alpine Combined
20 January	14:15	Men's Team Alpine Combined
21 January	9:30 (1st run)	Women's giant slalom
22 January	9:30 (1st run)	Men's giant slalom
23 January	16:00	Mixed Team Parallel
24 January	9:30 (1st run)	Women's slalom
25 January	9:30 (1st run)	Men's slalom

== Medal summary ==
=== Men's events ===
Event	Gold		Silver		Bronze	
Downhill	Rok Ažnoh; Slovenia	55.06	Alban Elezi Cannaferina; France	55.56	Livio Hiltbrand; Switzerland	55.88
Super-Gs	Livio Hiltbrand; Switzerland	1:00.17	Lenz Hächler; Switzerland	1:00.20	Vincent Wieser; Austria	1:00.28
Team Alpine Combined	Corrado Barbera; Marco Abbruzzese; Italy	1:37.94	Nicko Palamaras; Luis Vogt; Germany	1:38.33	Jakob Greber; Vincent Wieser; Austria	1:38.35
Giant Slalom	Alban Elezi Cannaferina; France	1:43.61	Eduard Hallberg; Finland	1:43.93	Oscar Andreas Sandvik; Norway	1:44.04
Slalom	Corrado Barbera; Italy	1:39.21	Adam Hofstedt; Sweden	1:39.50	Antoine Azzolin; France	1:39.59

=== Ladies events ===
Event	Gold		Silver		Bronze	
Downhill	Stefanie Grob; Switzerland	57.51	Vicky Bernardi; Italy	57.54	Pernille Dyrstad Lydersen; Norway	57.86
Super-G	Lara Colturi; Albania	1:01.64	Stefanie Grob; Switzerland	1:02.29	Alice Calaba; Italy	1:02.36
Team Alpine Combined	Janine Mächler; Stefanie Grob; Switzerland	1:41.87	Elina Lipp; Emma Aicher; Germany	1:42.12	Beatrice Sola; Alice Calaba; Italy	1:42.27
Giant Slalom	Hanna Aronsson Elfman; Sweden	2:06.02	Stefanie Grob; Switzerland	2:07.08	Lara Colturi; Albania	2:07.26
Slalom	Hanna Aronsson Elfman; Sweden	1:36.98	Janine Mächler; Switzerland	1:37.43	Beatrice Sola; Italy	1:37.98

=== Mixed events ===
Event	Gold	Silver	Bronze
Team parallel	Sweden; Cornelia Öhlund; Emil Nyberg; Liza Backlund; Lucas Kongsholm	Italy; Ambra Pomare; Pietro Motterlini; Giulia Valleriani; Davide Seppi	Norway; Pernille Lydersen; Hans Grahl-Madsen; Pia Møller; Jesper Wahlqvist

=== Medal table ===
* Host nation (Austria)

Rank	Nation	Gold	Silver	Bronze	Total
1	Switzerland	3	4	1	8
2	Sweden	3	1	0	4
3	Italy	2	2	3	7
4	France	1	1	1	3
5	Albania	1	0	1	2
6	Slovenia	1	0	0	1
7	Germany	0	2	0	2
8	Finland	0	1	0	1
9	Norway	0	0	3	3
10	Austria*	0	0	2	2
Totals (10 entries)		11	11	11	33

== Participating nations ==
- Albania
- Andorra
- Argentina
- Australia (3)
- Austria (16)
- Belgium
- Brazil (1)
- Bulgaria
- Canada (12)
- Chile
- China
- Croatia
- Czech Republic
- Denmark
- Estonia
- Finland
- France
- Germany (14)
- Great Britain (11)
- Greece
- Haiti
- Hong Kong
- Hungary
- Ireland
- Israel
- Italy
- Japan
- Kazakhstan
- Kyrgyzstan
- Lebanon
- Liechtenstein
- Lithuania
- Luxembourg
- Malaysia
- Mexico
- Netherlands
- Norway (12)
- New Zealand
- Poland
- Portugal
- Romania
- Serbia
- Singapore
- Slovakia
- Slovenia
- Spain
- Sweden
- Switzerland (16)
- Trinidad and Tobago
- Turkey
- Ukraine
- United States (17)
- Uzbekistan
