= 2023 Alpine Skiing World Cup – Women's overall =

Alpine ski discipline year standings

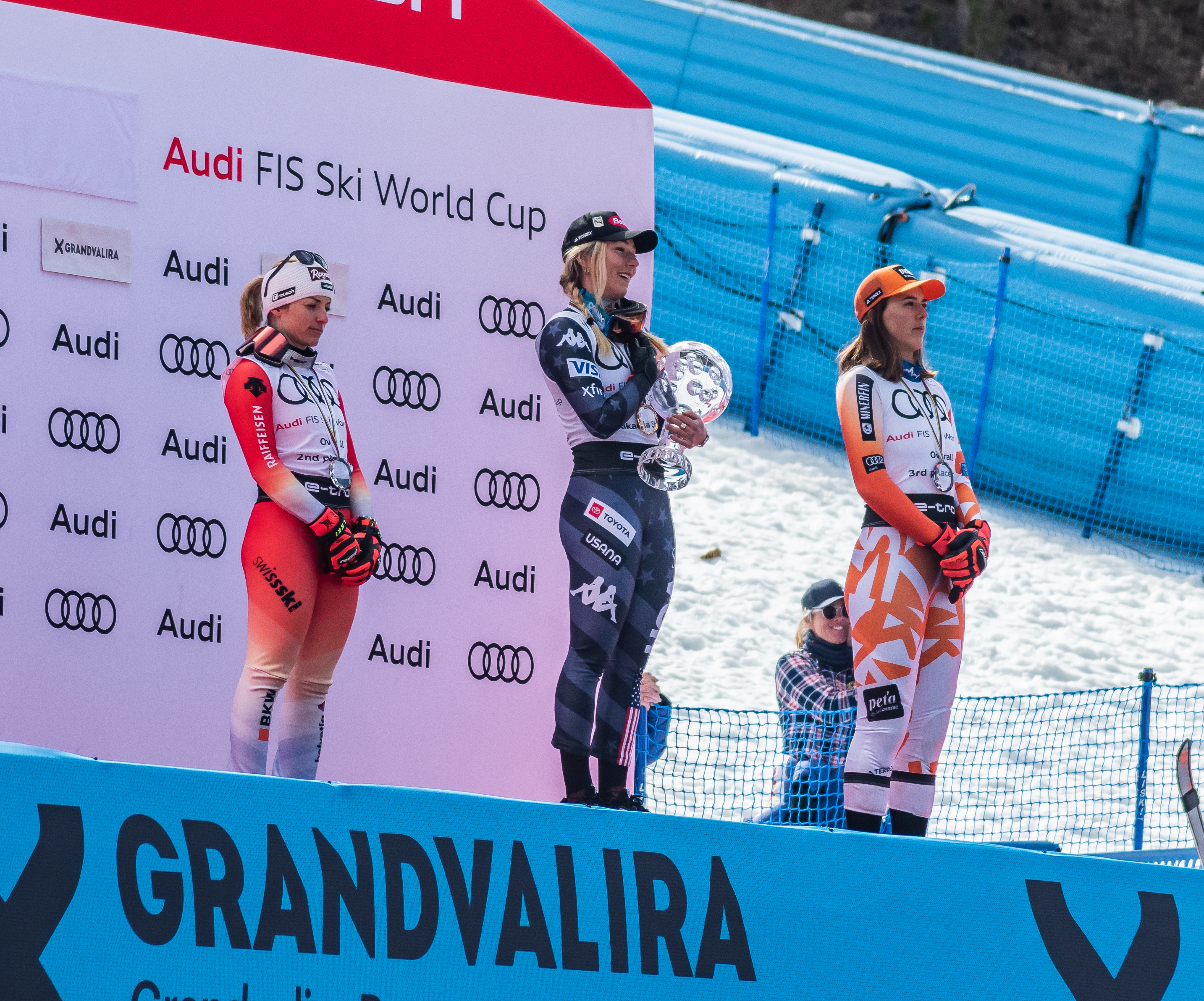
2023 Women's Overall World Cup: 2023 Women's overall World Cup podium – 1st place: Mikaela Shiffrin (USA), center; 2nd place: Lara Gut-Behrami (SUI), left; 3rd place: Petra Vlhová (SVK), right.; 2023 Women's World Cup; Overall • Downhill • Super-G; Giant slalom • Slalom
Previous: 2022	Next: 2024

The women's overall competition in the 2023 FIS Alpine Skiing World Cup consisted of 38 events in four disciplines: downhill (DH) (9 races), super-G (SG) (8 races), giant slalom (GS) (10 races), and slalom (SL) (11 races). The fifth and sixth disciplines, parallel (PAR). and Alpine combined (AC), had all events in the 2022–23 season cancelled, either due to the schedule disruption cased by the COVID-19 pandemic (AC) or due to bad weather (PAR). The original schedule called for 42 races, but in addition to the parallel, two downhills and a super-G were cancelled during the season.

The season was interrupted by the 2023 World Ski Championships in the linked resorts of Courchevel and Méribel, France, which are located in Les Trois Vallées, from 6–19 February 2023.

== Season summary ==
From the very first race of the season, defending champion (and four-time overall champion) Mikaela Shiffrin of the United States seized the lead in the standings due to her abilities in all four disciplines. After the first thirteen races, she had built over a 300-point lead over 2021 overall champion Petra Vlhová of Slovakia. In addition, with her victory in a slalom at Semmering, Austria on December 29, Shiffrin, 27, became only the third skier (and second woman) to win 80 World Cup races, as well as the first ever to win 50 races in a single discipline.

After 24 races, almost two-thirds of the season, Shiffrin held a lead of over 500 points over Vlhová, with 2016 overall champion Lara Gut-Behrami of Switzerland close behind in third; however, the focus of the moment was on Shiffrin's quest to break Lindsey Vonn's all-time women's record of 82 World Cup victories (which she had already tied) and then Ingemar Stenmark's all-time overall record of 86 such victories. She shattered Vonn's record with victories in back-to-back giant slaloms in Kronplatz on 24–25 January, increasing her overall lead (now with Gut-Behrami in second) to over 600 points.

By the end of January, which was the time for the break for the 2023 World Ski Championships, Shiffrin had 11 wins on the season (1 in super-G and 5 each in giant slalom and slalom) and 85 wins for her career. Shiffrin's fifth-place finish in a downhill at Kvitfjell on 4 March was sufficient to clinch the season championship, although there were still seven races left in the season. The overall title represented Shiffrin's fifth, tying her with Luxembourg's Marc Girardelli, who also won five, and placed her behind only two Austrians: Annemarie Moser-Pröll, who won six in the 1970s, and Marcel Hirscher, who won eight in a row in the 2010s.

Shiffrin's later victories in both a giant slalom and a slalom at Åre, Sweden (her sixth of the season in each discipline) enabled her to equal and then break Ingemar Stenmark's all-time overall record of 86 World Cup wins (with 87), as well as tying Vreni Schneider's all-time women's record of 20 giant slalom victories (to go along with her all-time record 53 slalom wins, plus 5 super-Gs, 5 parallels, 3 downhills, and 1 combined). And to top the season off a week later, Shiffrin won the giant slalom at finals, breaking Schneider's women's career victory record in that discipline with 21 and also breaking Lindsey Vonn's record for career World Cup podiums with 138 (in only her 249th World Cup start).

Indicative of the degree of specialization in the World Cup this season (despite the end of the COVID separation between the speed skiers and the technical skiers) is that Shiffrin was the only skier, male or female, to place in the top 25 in all four disciplines, and only four women and one man even scored points in all four disciplines: Shiffrin, Federica Brignone (#4), Michelle Gisin (#13), and Franziska Gritsch (#23) among the women, and Marco Schwarz (#7) among the men.

== Finals ==
The last events of the season took place at the World Cup finals, Wednesday, 15 March 2023 through Sunday, 19 March 2023 in Soldeu, Andorra. Only the top 25 in each specific discipline for the season and the winner of the Junior World Championship in each discipline were eligible to compete in the finals, with the exception that any skier who has scored at least 500 points in the overall classification was eligible to participate in any discipline, regardless of her standing in that discipline for the season.

== Standings ==
#	Skier	DH; 9 races	SG; 8 races	GS; 10 races	SL; 11 races	Total
	(United States) Mikaela Shiffrin	221	240	800	945	2,206
2	(Switzerland) Lara Gut-Behrami	272	413	532	0	1,217
3	(Slovakia) Petra Vlhová	9	0	486	630	1,125
4	(Italy) Federica Brignone	218	368	476	7	1,069
5	(Italy) Sofia Goggia	740	176	0	0	916
6	(Norway) Ragnhild Mowinckel	226	366	311	0	903
7	(Switzerland) Wendy Holdener	0	74	129	655	858
8	(Italy) Marta Bassino	34	200	515	0	749
9	(Italy) Elena Curtoni	308	358	0	0	666
10	(Sweden) Sara Hector	0	0	393	243	636
11	(Slovenia) Ilka Štuhec	551	51	0	0	602
12	(Switzerland) Corinne Suter	309	259	3	0	571
13	(Switzerland) Michelle Gisin	140	198	61	153	552
14	(Austria) Cornelia Hütter	165	347	0	0	512
15	(United States) Paula Moltzan	0	0	209	297	506
16	(France) Tessa Worley	0	172	328	0	500
17	(Germany) Lena Dürr	0	0	0	493	493
18	(Sweden) Anna Swenn-Larsson	0	0	0	470	470
19	(Austria) Mirjam Puchner	273	189	0	0	462
20	(Norway) Thea Louise Stjernesund	0	0	236	170	406
21	(Slovenia) Ana Bucik	0	0	146	259	405
22	(Germany) Kira Weidle	250	151	0	0	401
23	(Austria) Franziska Gritsch	3	96	120	172	391
24	(Switzerland) Joana Hählen	220	166	0	0	386
25	(Canada) Valérie Grenier	0	30	354	0	384
26	(Norway) Kajsa Vickhoff Lie	246	106	0	0	352
27	(Croatia) Leona Popović	0	0	0	349	349
28	(Switzerland) Jasmine Flury	185	157	0	0	342
29	(Austria) Nina Ortlieb	229	107	0	0	336
30	(Austria) Ramona Siebenhofer	111	149	64	0	324
31	(New Zealand) Alice Robinson	34	72	207	0	313
32	(Austria) Stephanie Venier	113	163	0	0	276
33	(Norway) Mina Fürst Holtmann	0	0	136	127	263
34	(Austria) Katharina Truppe	0	0	37	222	259
35	(United States) Breezy Johnson	222	27	0	0	249
36	(France) Laura Gauché	150	97	0	0	247
37	(France) Romane Miradoli	82	161	3	0	246
38	(Sweden) Hanna Aronsson Elfman	0	0	0	240	240
39	(Austria) Katharina Liensberger	0	0	94	138	232
40	(Germany) Emma Aicher	48	59	0	110	217
41	(Croatia) Zrinka Ljutić	0	0	18	190	208
42	(Italy) Laura Pirovano	136	71	0	0	207
43	(Poland) Maryna Gasienica-Daniel	0	1	199	0	200
44	(Norway) Maria Therese Tviberg	0	0	94	103	197
45	(Switzerland) Priska Nufer	139	44	0	0	183
46	(United States) Isabella Wright	154	22	0	0	176
47	(Czech Republic) Martina Dubovská	0	0	0	168	168
48	(Austria) Tamara Tippler	89	71	0	0	160
	(Austria) Ricarda Haaser	0	22	138	0	160
50	(Canada) Laurence St. Germain	0	0	0	158	158
51	(Canada) Ali Nullmeyer	0	0	0	156	156
52	(Switzerland) Camille Rast	0	0	48	97	145
53	(Austria) Nicole Schmidhofer	15	120	0	0	135
54	(Germany) Jessica Hilzinger	0	0	0	133	133
55	(Austria) Christina Ager	94	29	0	0	123
56	(Canada) Amelia Smart	0	0	0	117	117
57	(Italy) Nicol Delago	105	9	0	0	114
58	(France) Coralie Frasse Sombet	0	0	101	0	101
59	(Switzerland) Elena Stoffel	0	0	0	95	95
60	(Switzerland) Andrea Ellenberger	0	0	93	0	93
61	(Slovenia) Neja Dvornik	0	0	22	64	86
62	(Austria) Stephanie Brunner	0	0	84	0	84
63	(France) Nastasia Noens	0	0	0	80	80
64	(Austria) Julia Scheib	0	0	79	0	79
65	(Italy) Roberta Melesi	0	40	38	0	78
66	(Canada) Marie-Michèle Gagnon	20	57	0	0	77
67	(Austria) Katharina Huber	0	0	8	66	74
68	(Sweden) Estelle Alphand	0	0	71	0	71
69	(Switzerland) Mélanie Meillard	0	0	0	70	70
70	(United States) Nina O'Brien	0	0	68	0	68
71	(Switzerland) Nicole Good	0	0	0	67	67
72	(Austria) Ariane Rädler	44	21	0	0	65
73	(Switzerland) Stephanie Jenal	32	32	0	0	64
	(Germany) Andrea Filser	0	0	0	64	64
	(Switzerland) Aline Danioth	0	0	0	64	64
76	(Italy) Marta Rossetti	0	0	0	61	61
77	(Austria) Elizabeth Kappaurer	0	0	60	0	60
78	(Albania) Lara Colturi	0	0	53	6	59
79	(Switzerland) Delia Durrer	48	7	0	0	55
80	(Switzerland) Juliana Suter	27	24	0	0	51

- Leader
- 2nd place
- 3rd place
- Updated at 19 March 2023, after all 38 events and 4 cancellations

== See also ==
- 2023 Alpine Skiing World Cup – Women's summary rankings
- 2023 Alpine Skiing World Cup – Women's downhill
- 2023 Alpine Skiing World Cup – Women's super-G
- 2023 Alpine Skiing World Cup – Women's giant slalom
- 2023 Alpine Skiing World Cup – Women's slalom
- 2023 Alpine Skiing World Cup – Men's overall
- World Cup scoring system
