= 2026 Alpine Skiing World Cup – Women's slalom =

Alpine ski discipline year standings

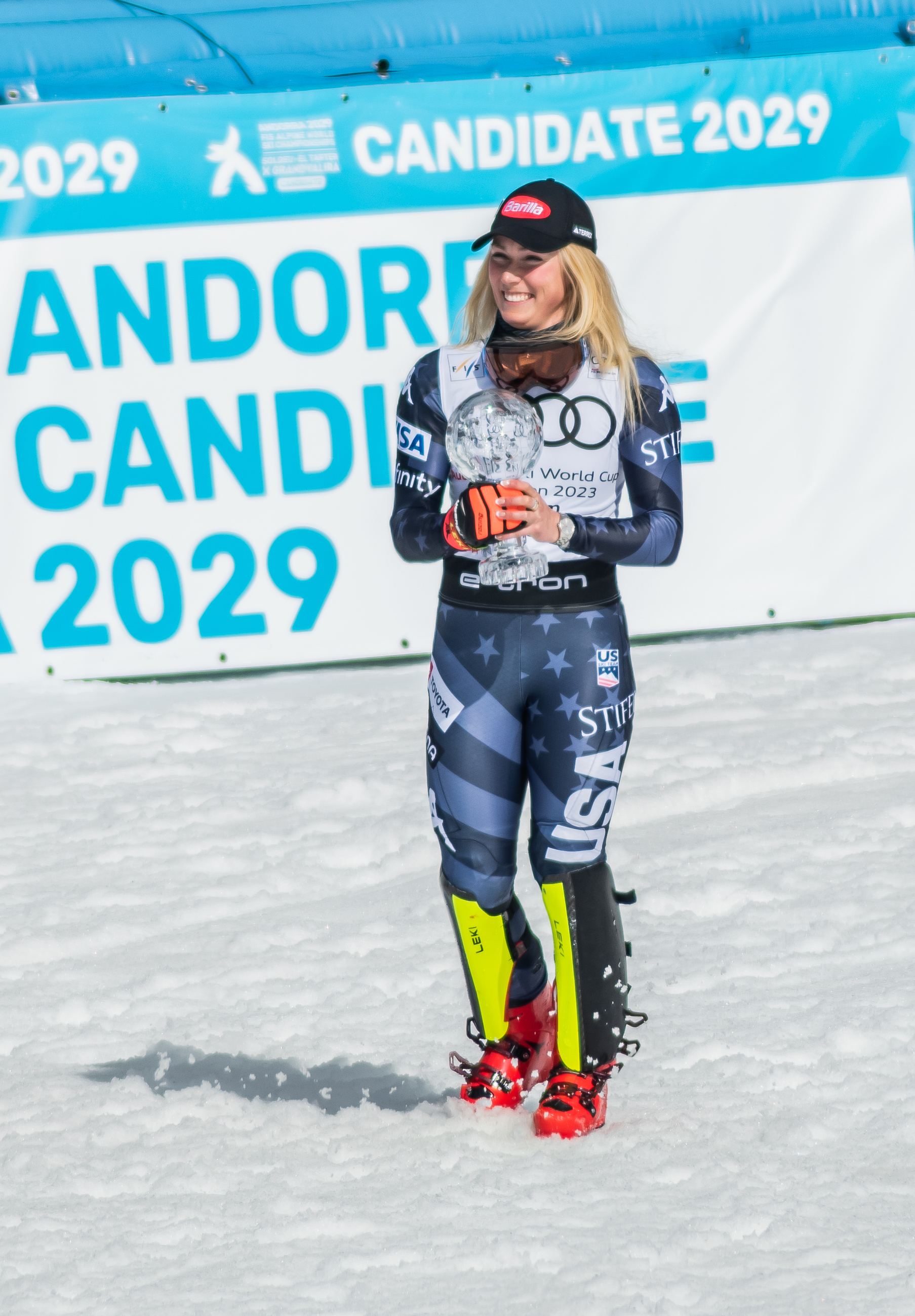
2026 Women's Slalom World Cup: Mikaela Shiffrin of the United States, season champion for the ninth time; 2026 Women's World Cup; Overall • Downhill • Super-G; Giant slalom • Slalom
Previous: 2025	Next: 2027

The women's slalom in the 2026 FIS Alpine Skiing World Cup consisted of ten events, including the final. The season began with the traditional "reindeer" opening race in Levi, Finland on 15 November 2025, followed by a race in Gurgl, Austria. The third slalom took place in the United States during the first World Cup visit to Copper Mountain (Colorado) for the women since 1999, after which the remainder of the races were held in Europe, including a return to the slopes of Czechia's Špindlerův Mlýn on 25 January 2026 for the first time in three years. The season champion for the ninth time in the discipline was Mikaela Shiffrin of the U.S., who dominated by winning nine of the ten races held during the season, usually by striking margins (earning 980 points of a possible 1,000), and who clinched the season title before the end of January.

The season was interrupted for the quadrennial 2026 Winter Olympics in three regions in Italy – Milan, the Stelvio Pass, and Cortina d'Ampezzo— from 6 to 22 February 2026. The Alpine slalom for women took place on the relatively flat technical course at Cortina d'Ampezzo. The championship in women's slalom was held on Wednesday, 18 February, and was also won handily by Shiffrin.

== Season summary ==
Due to injuries to their most prominent challengers, last season came down to a battle between Zrinka Ljutić of Croatia, now 21, and 2021 discipline champion Katharina Liensberger of Austria, now 28, which went to Ljutić. However, two 30-year-olds--two-time discipline champion Petra Vlhová of Slovakia (who missed all of last season with an injury suffered in January 2024 and will not return until midway through the season) and eight-time discipline champion Mikaela Shiffrin of the United States (who missed much of last season with a serious puncture wound, but still won four races in her limited appearances, giving her an all-time record of 101 World Cup wins)--are expected to return at full strength, which definitely creates uncertainty about the season's outcome.

And, indeed, in the season opener at Levi, Finland, Shiffrin showed a complete return to her previous form, posting the fastest time in both runs, blowing out the field by over a second and a half (with Lara Colturi of Albania, who was celebrating her 19th birthday, second), and winning her ninth reindeer for victory at Levi. The next weekend in Gurgl, Austria, Shiffrin again dominated, defeating second-place Colturi by 1.23 seconds. A week later, after the World Cup events had moved to North America for two weeks -- first at Copper Mountain, about a 30-minute drive from Shiffrin's hometown of Edwards, Colorado, Shiffrin continued her dominance, winning her third straight slalom, once again by over a second and a half (over Lena Dürr of Germany), with Colturi almost two seconds back in third.

After the World Cup season returned to Europe, Shiffrin's slalom domination remained unchanged, as she won the next race, a night slalom in Courcheval, France, by over 1.5 seconds once more, boosting her lead in the discipline standings to 180 points after just four races in the discipline. Two weeks later, the last slalom during 2025 was also a night slalom, and the first run took place on a mild afternoon that destroyed the course, with only 40 of the 77 starters even being able to finish due to all the damage . . . and times almost six seconds behind first-run leader Camille Rast of Switzerland, who had finished second in the previous day's giant slalom by .14 seconds and now held over a half-second lead on Shiffrin in fourth, still qualified for the second run. Although conditions for the second run (three and a half hours later) were better, 6 of the 30 racers nevertheless failed to finish, and 2 others were so far behind (over 8.5 seconds) that they did not earn any points; Rast, however, posted the second-best time for the second run . . . but failed to win, by .09 seconds this time, because Shiffrin closed with a great finishing run that beat Rast by .63 seconds, thus keeping Shiffrin undefeated for the season. The next week, the first weekend of 2026. the same two skiers dominated at Kranjska Gora, Slovenia, but this time Rast narrowly bettered Shiffrin in each run to win by 0.14 seconds and break Shiffrin's season-long slalom winning streak, while the next-best skier (Rast's teammate Wendy Holdener) finished over a second and a half (actually 1.83 seconds) behind.

A little over a week later, at a night slalom in Flachau, Austria, the top two after both runs were American, with Shiffrin winning and Paula Moltzan second -- maintaining a statistic that no American woman other than Shiffrin has won a World Cup slalom since Lindsey Vonn in 2009, and leaving Shiffrin with a 268-point lead in the discipline over Rast (who finished fourth), with only 300 possible points remaining for the season. That weekend, Vhlová announced that, after two years of recovery, she had finally been cleared to return to competitive skiing, and she hoped to compete enough to be ready to defend her 2022 slalom title in the Olympics. However, Vhlová chose not to return at Špindlerův Mlýn, Czechia, the last slalom before the Olympics, and Shiffrin repeated her early-season dominance, posting the fastest time on both runs, beating runner-up Rast by 1.67 seconds and the rest of the field by over two seconds, and (with a 288-point lead with only two races remaining) clinching the season crystal globe in the discipline (her record ninth in slalom, for the moment one better than Lindsey Vonn's eight in downhill).

At the Winter Olympics in Cortina, all eyes were focused on the weather, which had turned the flat technical course from powder (as in the previous runs on it) to ice, and on the unusual course setup by the Austrian coach for the first run -- but the setup did not hamper Shiffrin, as she posted a lead of 0.82 seconds over Dürr, the only racer within one second, and then posted the second-fastest time on the second run (behind only her teammate Moltzan (who placed eighth)) to win by 1.5 seconds, reclaiming the slalom gold medal that she previously won in 2014 -- and finally ending her almost-two-Olympics-long streak of not medaling. Two first-time medalists completed the podium: Rast claimed the silver medal for the first Alpine skiing medal won by the Swiss women (after eight won by the men), and Anna Swenn-Larsson of Sweden claimed the bronze; defending gold medalist Vlhová returned to competition but placed 20th. Back on the World Cup circuit at Åre (Sweden), Vhlova did not return after the Olympics, and Shiffrin tied the all-time record, previously held by Janica Kostelic (2001) and herself (2019), with her eighth slalom victory of the season by almost a full second over Emma Aicher of Germany (the best slalom result of her young career), while Rast's tenth-place finish clinched second place in the discipline for the season; Aicher, who competes in every discipline (as Shiffrin did before her injuries), remained in second place in the overall standings, 140 points behind Shiffrin, with just the finals remaining.

== Finals ==
The World Cup finals in the discipline are scheduled to take place on Tuesday, 24 March 2026 on the Olympialøypa course at Hafjell, near Lillehammer, Norway. Only the top 25 skiers in the World Cup slalom discipline and the winner of the 2026 FIS Junior World Championships in the discipline (Anna Trocker of Italy), plus any skiers who have scored at least 500 points in the World Cup overall classification for the season, will be eligible to compete in the final, and only the top 15 will earn World Cup points. Two of the qualified skiers (Katharina Liensberger of Austria and Martina Peterlini of Italy) did not compete due to injury, and no 500-plus point skiers registered, so the field consisted of Trocker and the remaining 23 qualifiers, or 24, with the battle for the season overall title between Shiffrin (who held a 45-point lead) and Aicher on the line in this race and tomorrow's giant slalom, although both disciplines had already been decided. In the race, Shiffrin took over a second lead over the field on the first run and maintained it on the second; her victory (her 110th overall on the World Cup circuit) made her the first woman to achieve nine victories in one discipline in a season. Wendy Holdener finished second to clinch third place in the discipline for the season, and Aicher's third place left her 85 points behind Shiffrin, thus allowing Aicher to retain a theoretical chance of winning the overall title were she to win the last race of finals (tomorrow's giant slalom) and Shiffrin place worse than 15th.

== Standings ==
	Venue	15 Nov 2025; Levi	23 Nov 2025; Gurgl	30 Nov 2025; Copper Mountain	16 Dec 2025; Courchevel	29 Dec 2025; Semmering	4 Jan 2026; Kranjska Gora	13 Jan 2026; Flachau	25 Jan 2026; Špindlerův Mlýn	18 Feb 2026; Cortina d'Ampezzo	15 Mar 2026; Åre	24 Mar 2026; Hafjell	
#	Skier	(Finland)	(Austria)	(United States)	(France)	(Austria)	(Slovenia)	(Austria)	(Czech Republic)	(Italy)	(Sweden)	(Norway)	Total
	(United States) Mikaela Shiffrin	100	100	100	100	100	80	100	100	①	100	100	980
2	(Switzerland) Camille Rast	16	60	26	80	80	100	50	80	②	26	20	538
3	(Switzerland) Wendy Holdener	32	50	50	36	40	60	45	45	④	60	80	498
4	(Austria) Katharina Truppe	15	40	36	50	45	45	60	50	⑤	50	50	441
5	(United States) Paula Moltzan	50	45	32	45	DNF2	50	80	DNF2	⑧	45	45	392
6	(Germany) Emma Aicher	60	29	DNF2	60	DNF1	32	DNF2	60	⑨	80	60	381
7	(Albania) Lara Colturi	80	80	60	DNF1	60	DNF1	32	DNF1	⑩	32	0	344
8	(Sweden) Anna Swenn-Larsson	24	26	45	40	DNF2	29	40	40	③	20	40	304
9	(Germany) Lena Dürr	50	36	80	DNF2	14	24	DNF2	26	DNF2	16	0	246
10	(Sweden) Sara Hector	24	32	29	DNF2	DSQ2	18	36	29	DNF2	9	36	213
11	(France) Marion Chevrier	29	16	11	29	18	9	12	24	DNF1	13	26	187
12	(Sweden) Cornelia Öhlund	13	DNF1	DNQ	24	36	16	DNF1	36	DNF2	36	24	185
13	(Latvia) Dženifera Ģērmane	10	18	DNS	26	26	36	DNF1	DNS	DNF1	40	16	172
14	(Italy) Lara Della Mea	DNQ	13	8	32	0	40	24	DNQ	⑬	22	0	139
15	(Austria) Katharina Huber	15	22	20	DNF2	DNF1	15	26	36	⑥	DNF1	0	134
16	(Switzerland) Mélanie Meillard	9	DNF1	14	14	15	22	DNQ	15	⑦	15	22	126
17	(Sweden) Hanna Aronsson Elfman	12	11	13	9	10	7	DNF1	9	DNF1	29	18	118
18	(Austria) Katharina Liensberger	26	DNF1	40	DNF1	50	DNS						116
19	(Switzerland) Eliane Christen	DNQ	6	12	12	29	8	29	15	DNF2	4	0	115
20	(France) Caitlin McFarlane	20	DNF1	22	DNF2	DNF1	DNF1	12	16	⑩	12	32	114
21	(Austria) Katharina Gallhuber	7	20	24	DNF1	20	10	5	18	㉒	10	DNF1	114
22	(Canada) Laurence St-Germain	DNS	24	16	20	22	DNF1	9	DNS	⑫	DNQ	0	91
23	(Croatia) Zrinka Ljutić	40	DNF2	DNF1	DNF1	32	DNF1	7	DNF2	㉖	DNF2	0	79
24	(France) Marie Lamure	DNQ	8	DNF2	10	DNF2	11	22	22	⑮	DNQ	0	73
25	(Italy) Martina Peterlini	DNS		DNQ	11	16	26	15	4	⑬	DNF1	DNS	72
26	(Slovenia) Ana Bucik Jogan	11	DNQ	DNQ	16	DNF1	DNQ	16	12	㉔	8	NE	63
27	(Austria) Lisa Hörhager	8	12	DNF1	22	DNS	DNS1	18	DNF1	㉕	DNQ	NE	60
28	(Austria) Natalie Falch	DNQ	5	DNS	13	24	DNF1	14	DNQ	DNS	DNQ	NE	56
29	(Japan) Asa Ando	5	15	7	15	DNF2	DNQ	DNF1	DNS1	DNF1	7	NE	49
30	(United States) AJ Hurt	DNF1	DNF2	DNS			20	DNF1	DNF2	⑲	18	NE	38
31	(United States) Nina O'Brien	DNF1	DNF2	5	DNQ	DNQ	12	20	DNF2	DNF1	DNQ	NE	37
32	(Slovenia) Neja Dvornik	36	DNS1	DNS								NE	36
33	(Czech Republic) Martina Dubovská	DNQ	DNS			DNF1	DNQ	DNQ	10	⑱	24	NE	34
34	(Italy) Emilia Mondinelli	4	DNF1	DNQ	DNQ	DNF1	4	DNF1	11	DNS	14	NE	33
35	(Switzerland) Anuk Brändli	DNQ	10	4	18	DNF1	DNF1	DNF1	DNF1	DNS	DNS	NE	32
36	(Sweden) Estelle Alphand	DNF2	DNF2	DNQ	DNF2	12	14	DNF2	6	DNS	DNQ	NE	32
37	(Norway) Bianca Bakke Westhoff	18	DNF1	DNF1	DNF2	DNF2	DNF1	DNQ	13	㉑	DNQ	NE	31
38	(Italy) Anna Trocker	DNS							DNF1	DNF1	DNS	29	29
39	(Norway) Thea Louise Stjernesund	DNQ	DNS	18	DNF1	DNF1	DNF1	DNS	7	DNF1	DSQ1	NE	25
40	(Canada) Amelia Smart	DNQ	DNQ	6	8	DNF1	DNQ	DSQ1	DNQ	㉗	11	NE	25
41	(Switzerland) Aline Höpli	DNQ	DNQ	DNQ	DNF1	11	DNQ	13	DNQ	DNS	DNQ	NE	24
42	(Switzerland) Aline Danioth	DNQ	DNQ	15	DNF1	DNF1	DNF1	6	DNQ	DNS	DNQ	NE	21
43	(United States) Liv Moritz	DNQ	DNF1	DSQ1	DNQ	DNF1	DNF1	DNQ	20	DNS	DNS1	NE	20
44	(Norway) Mina Fürst Holtmann	DNF2	7	DNF2	7	DNF1	DNQ	DNS	DNQ	⑰	6	NE	20
45	(Italy) Giulia Valleriani	DNQ	DNF1	DNS	DNQ	DNF1	13	DNQ	DNQ	DNS	5	NE	18
46	(Austria) Franziska Gritsch	DNQ	14	DNF1	DNF1	DNF1	DNQ	DNQ	DSQ1	DNS	DNQ	NE	14
47	(Andorra) Carla Mijares Ruf	DNQ	DNF1	DNQ	DNF1	13	DNQ	DNF1	DNF1	DNF1	DNS	NE	13
48	(Switzerland) Nicole Good	DNQ	DNF1	10	DNF1	DNF1	DNQ	DNF1	DNQ	DNS	DNF1	NE	10
48	(Canada) Ali Nullmeyer	DNQ	DNF1	DNS1	DNS			10	DNS	⑯	DNF1	NE	10
50	(Germany) Jessica Hilzinger	DNQ	DNQ	9	DNQ	DNF1	DNF1	DNQ	DNF1	DNS	DNQ	NE	9
50	(Japan) Chisaki Maeda	DNF1	DNQ	DNQ	DNQ	9	DNQ	DNF1	DNS		DNF1	NE	9
50	(Croatia) Leona Popović	DNQ	9	DNQ	DNF1	DNF1	DNQ	DNQ	DNQ	DSQ2	DNF2	NE	9
53	(France) Doriane Escané	DNQ	DNF1	DNF1	DNQ	DNF1	DNQ	DNS	8	DNF2	DNQ	NE	8
53	(Slovenia) Nika Tomšič	DNS	DNF1	DNS		DNF1	DNF1	8	DNQ	㉘	DNF1	NE	8
55	(Sweden) Moa Landström	DNS					6	DNF1	DNS	DNS	DNS	NE	6
55	(Hungary) Zita Tóth	6	DNF1	DNS	DNQ	DNQ	DNF1	DNQ	DNS	㉛	DNQ	NE	6
57	(Canada) Justine Lamontagne	DNS							5	DNS	DNS	NE	5
57	(Italy) Beatrice Sola	DNQ	DNF1	DNQ	DNQ	DNF1	5	DNF1	DNS		DSQ1	NE	5
59	(Finland) Rosa Pohjolainen	3	DNF1	DNS	DNF1	DNS	DNF1	DNS		DNF2	DNF1	NE	3
59	(Israel) Noa Szőllős	DNQ	DNS			DNQ	3	DNF2	DNS	DNF1	DNF1	NE	3
61	(Austria) Leonie Raich	DNS			DNQ	DNF1	2	DNF1	DNS		DNQ	NE	2
62	(United States) Elisabeth Bocock	DNS		DSQ1	DNQ	DNF1	1	DNF1	DNF1	DNS	DNQ	NE	1
	References												

=== Legend ===
- Winner (100 points)
- 2nd place (80 points)
- 3rd place (60 points)
- DNQ = Did not qualify for run 2
- DNF1 = Did not finish run 1
- DSQ1 = Disqualified run 1
- DNF2 = Did not finish run 2
- DSQ2 = Disqualified run 2
- DNS2 = Did not start run 2
- Did not start (DNS)
- Not eligible for finals (NE)
- Race canceled (x)
- FIS non-World Cup race (Olympics)
- R# = Rescheduled (make-up) race
- Updated on 24 March 2026, after all events.

== See also ==
- 2026 Alpine Skiing World Cup – Women's summary rankings
- 2026 Alpine Skiing World Cup – Women's overall
- 2026 Alpine Skiing World Cup – Women's downhill
- 2026 Alpine Skiing World Cup – Women's super-G
- 2026 Alpine Skiing World Cup – Women's giant slalom
- World Cup scoring system
