= World Junior Alpine Skiing Championships 2024 =

2024 skiing competition

World Junior Alpine Skiing Championships
- Location: Haute-Savoie, France
- Dates: 30 January – 3 February
- Teams: 56

The 2024 World Junior Alpine Skiing Championships were held at Haute-Savoie in Auvergne-Rhône-Alpes region, France from 30 January to 3 February 2024. It was the sixth time that a World Junior Alpine Skiing Championship was held in France after the editions in 1982, 1998, 1999, 2003 and 2010.

The races took place on several courses: Chatel, Les Gets, Morzine, St. Jean d'Aulps and Avoriaz.

== Schedule ==
The competitive program is as follows (all times CET)

Date	Time	Discipline
30 January	11:00	Women's Downhill
30 January	12:00	Men's Downhill
31 January	11:00	Women's Super G
31 January	12:00	Men's Super G
31 January	17:30	Women's slalom team combines
31 January	18:15	Men's slalom team combines
1 February	17:00	Mixed Team event
2 February	10:00 (1st run)	Women's giant slalom
2 February	15:00 (1st run)	Men's slalom
3 February	11:00 (1st run)	Men's giant slalom
3 February	12:00 (1st run)	Women's slalom

== Medal summary ==
=== Men's events ===
Event	Gold		Silver		Bronze	
Downhill	Livio Hiltbrand; Switzerland	1:19.05	Gregorio Bernardi; Italy	1:19.40	Max Perathoner; Italy	1:19.52
Super-G	Max Perathoner; Italy	1:12.27	Ander Mintegui; Spain	1:12.48	Livio Hiltbrand; Switzerland	1:12.49
Team Alpine Combined	Max Perathoner; Edoardo Saracco; Italy	2:01.84	Alban Elezi Cannaferina; Antoine Azzolin; France	2:02.03	Moritz Zudrell; Jakob Greber; Austria	2:02.38
Giant Slalom	Ryder Sarchett; United States	2:06.97	Alban Elezi Cannaferina; France	2:07.03	Fabian Ax Swartz; Sweden	2:07.07
Slalom	Lenz Hächler; Switzerland	1:40.70	Moritz Zudrell; Austria	1:41.09	Hans Grahl-Madsen; Norway	1:41.27

=== Ladies events ===
Event	Gold		Silver		Bronze	
Downhill	Victoria Olivier; Austria	1:08.39	Malorie Blanc; Switzerland	1:08.40	Rosa Pohjolainen; Finland	1:08.79
Super-G	Malorie Blanc; Switzerland	1:15.03	Viktoria Bürgler; Austria	1:15.50	Nicole Eibl; Austria	1:16.17
Team Alpine Combined	Malorie Blanc; Anuk Brändli; Switzerland	2:06.38	Viktoria Bürgler; Natalie Falch; Austria	2:06.91	Stefanie Grob; Janine Mächler; Switzerland	2:07.37
Giant Slalom	Britt Richardson; Canada	2:01.96	Stefanie Grob; Switzerland	2:02.77	Lara Colturi; Albania	2:03.14
Slalom	Dženifera Ģērmane; Latvia	1:22.98	Anuk Brändli; Switzerland	1:24.40	Cornelia Öhlund; Sweden	1:24.57

=== Mixed events ===
Event	Gold	Silver	Bronze
Team parallel	Thea Jellum; Johs Herland; Madeleine Sylvester-Davik; Hans Grahl-Madsen; Norway	Cornelia Öhlund; Lucas Kongsholm; Liza Backlund; Emil Nyberg; Sweden	Liv Moritz; Camden Palmquist; Elisabeth Bocock; Cooper Puckett; United States

=== Medal table ===
* Host nation (France)

Rank	Nation	Gold	Silver	Bronze	Total
1	Switzerland	4	3	2	9
2	Italy	2	1	1	4
3	Austria	1	3	2	6
4	Norway	1	0	1	2
4	United States	1	0	1	2
6	Canada	1	0	0	1
6	Latvia	1	0	0	1
8	France*	0	2	0	2
9	Sweden	0	1	2	3
10	Spain	0	1	0	1
11	Albania	0	0	1	1
11	Finland	0	0	1	1
Totals (12 entries)		11	11	11	33
