= Marta Rossetti =

Italian alpine skier

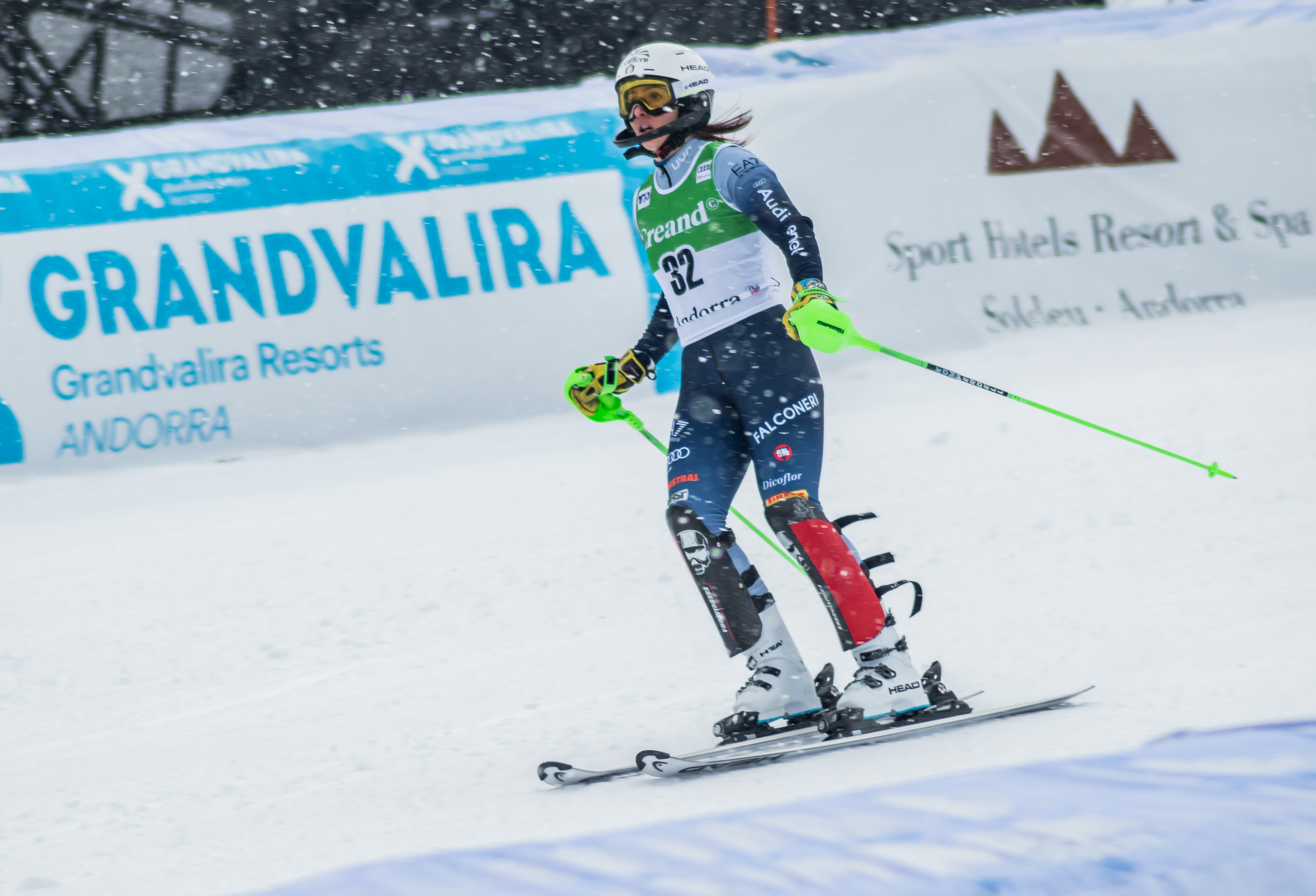
- Rossetti in 2024.

Personal information
- Born: 25 March 1999 (age 27) Salò, Italy

Skiing career
- Sport: Alpine skiing
- Club: G.S. Fiamme Oro
- Disciplines: Technical events
- World Cup debut: 2019

Olympics
- Teams: 0

World Championships
- Teams: 2

World Cup
- Seasons: 7

Marta Rossetti (born 25 March 1999) is an Italian World Cup alpine skier who specializes in technical events.

== Career ==
Se has finished in the top 10 two times in World Cup.

== World Cup results ==
Top 10

Date	Place	Discipline	Rank
09-03-2025	(Sweden) Åre	Slalom	8
26-11-2023	(United States) Killington	Slalom	5
