= FIS Alpine Junior World Ski Championships =

Skiing competitions

FIS Alpine World Ski Championships
- Status: active
- Genre: sports competition
- Date: January–March
- Frequency: annual
- Location: various
- Inaugurated: 1982
- Organiser: FIS

The FIS Alpine Junior World Ski Championships are international competitions in Alpine skiing. They are organized by the International Ski Federation (FIS).

== Championships ==
| Edition | Year | Host city | Host country | Events |
|---|---|---|---|---|
| 1 | 1982 | Auron | France | 8 |
| 2 | 1983 | Sestriere | Italy | 8 |
| 3 | 1984 | Sugarloaf | United States | 8 |
| 4 | 1985 | Jasná | Czechoslovakia | 8 |
| 5 | 1986 | Bad Kleinkirchheim | Austria | 8 |
| 6 | 1987 | Hemsedal/Sälen | Norway/Sweden | 8 |
| 7 | 1988 | Madonna | Italy | 10 |
| 8 | 1989 | Aleyska | United States | 10 |
| 9 | 1990 | Zinal | Switzerland | 10 |
| 10 | 1991 | Hemsedal | Norway | 10 |
| 11 | 1992 | Maribor | Slovenia | 10 |
| 12 | 1993 | Montecampione | Italy | 10 |
| 13 | 1994 | Lake Placid | United States | 10 |
| 14 | 1995 | Voss | Norway | 10 |
| 15 | 1996 | Hoch-Ybrig | Switzerland | 10 |
| 16 | 1997 | Schladming | Austria | 10 |
| 17 | 1998 | Megève | France | 10 |
| 18 | 1999 | Pra-Loup | France | 10 |
| 19 | 2000 | Québec | Canada | 10 |
| 20 | 2001 | Verbier | Switzerland | 10 |
| 21 | 2002 | Tarvisio | Italy | 9 |
| 22 | 2003 | Briançon | France | 10 |
| 23 | 2004 | Maribor | Slovenia | 10 |
| 24 | 2005 | Bardonecchia | Italy | 10 |
| 25 | 2006 | Québec | Canada | 10 |

| Edition | Year | Host city | Host country | Events |
|---|---|---|---|---|
| 26 | 2007 | Altenmarkt/Flachau | Austria | 10 |
| 27 | 2008 | Formigal | Spain | 10 |
| 28 | 2009 | Garmisch Classic | Germany | 10 |
| 29 | 2010 | Les Houches | France | 10 |
| 30 | 2011 | Crans-Montana | Switzerland | 10 |
| 31 | 2012 | Roccaraso | Italy | 11 |
| 32 | 2013 | Québec | Canada | 11 |
| 33 | 2014 | Jasná | Slovakia | 11 |
| 34 | 2015 | Hafjell | Norway | 11 |
| 35 | 2016 | Sochi | Russia | 11 |
| 36 | 2017 | Åre | Sweden | 11 |
| 37 | 2018 | Davos | Switzerland | 11 |
| 38 | 2019 | Trentino/Val di Fassa | Italy | 11 |
| 39 | 2020 | Narvik | Norway | 6 |
| 40 | 2021 | Bansko | Bulgaria | 6 |
| 41 | 2022 | Invermere | Canada | 11 |
| 42 | 2023 | St. Anton | Austria | 11 |
| 43 | 2024 | Haute-Savoie | France | 11 |
| 44 | 2025 | Tarvisio | Italy | 11 |
| 45 | 2026 | Narvik | Norway | 9 |

== Medals (1982-2026) ==
Updated after World Junior Alpine Skiing Championships 2026 result.

| Rank | Nation | Gold | Silver | Bronze | Total |
|---|---|---|---|---|---|
| 1 | Austria | 106 | 115 | 106 | 327 |
| 2 | Switzerland | 66 | 71 | 48 | 185 |
| 3 | Italy | 49 | 45 | 46 | 140 |
| 4 | France | 34 | 18 | 37 | 89 |
| 5 | Norway | 32 | 37 | 32 | 101 |
| 6 | United States | 32 | 28 | 27 | 87 |
| 7 | Sweden | 29 | 22 | 15 | 66 |
| 8 | Germany | 20 | 26 | 21 | 67 |
| 9 | Slovenia | 16 | 13 | 17 | 46 |
| 10 | Canada | 11 | 11 | 17 | 39 |
| 11 | West Germany | 8 | 8 | 5 | 21 |
| 12 | Yugoslavia | 7 | 7 | 8 | 22 |
| 13 | Soviet Union | 3 | 2 | 4 | 9 |
| 14 | Finland | 2 | 6 | 10 | 18 |
| 15 | Liechtenstein | 2 | 4 | 1 | 7 |
| 16 | Croatia | 2 | 3 | 6 | 11 |
| 17 | Czechoslovakia | 2 | 3 | 3 | 8 |
| 18 | Czech Republic | 2 | 1 | 4 | 7 |
| 19 | Slovakia | 2 | 0 | 1 | 3 |
| 20 | Japan | 1 | 2 | 2 | 5 |
| 21 | Albania | 1 | 0 | 2 | 3 |
| 22 | Bulgaria | 1 | 0 | 1 | 2 |
| 22 | New Zealand | 1 | 0 | 1 | 2 |
| 24 | Russia | 0 | 4 | 4 | 8 |
| 25 | Great Britain | 0 | 2 | 1 | 3 |
| 26 | Spain | 0 | 1 | 2 | 3 |
| 27 | Belgium | 0 | 0 | 3 | 3 |
| 28 | Chile | 0 | 0 | 1 | 1 |
| Totals (28 entries) | | 429 | 429 | 425 | 1,283 |

== See also ==
- Alpine skiing at the Winter Olympics
- Alpine skiing at the Winter Paralympics
- Alpine skiing at the Youth Olympic Games
- Alpine skiing World Cup
- FIS Alpine World Ski Championships
- World Para Alpine Skiing Championships
