= Tommaso =

Tommaso is an Italian given name. It has also been used as a surname. Notable people with the name include:

== Given name ==
=== A ===
- Tommaso Acquaviva d'Aragona (1600–1672), Roman Catholic prelate
- Tommaso Aldrovandini (1653–1736), Italian painter of the Baroque period
- Tommaso de Aleni (16th century), Italian painter of the Renaissance period
- Tommaso Allan, Italian rugby union player
- Tommaso Amantini (1625–1675), Italian sculptor and painter of the Baroque period
- Tommaso Ammirato (died 1438), Roman Catholic prelate
- Tommaso d'Ancora (1583–1656), Roman Catholic prelate
- Tommaso d'Aquino (disambiguation), multiple people
- Tommaso Arrigoni (born 1994), Italian football midfielder
- Tommaso Audisio (1789–1845), Italian priest and architect
- Tommaso D'Avalos (1610–1642) was a Roman Catholic prelate

=== B ===
- Tommaso Badia (1483–1547), Italian Dominican cardinal
- Tommaso Balestrieri (18th century), Italian luthier
- Tommaso Barnabei (c. 1500–1559), Italian painter
- Tommaso Bellazzini (born 1987), Italian footballer
- Tommaso Benedetti (1797–1863), English-born Austrian painter of Italian descent
- Tommaso Benvenuti (rugby union) (born 1990), Italian rugby union player
- Tommaso Berni (born 1983), Italian football goalkeeper
- Tommaso Besozzi (1903–1964), Italian journalist and writer
- Tommaso Bianchi (born 1988), Italian football midfielder
- Tommaso Bisagno (1935–2014), Italian academic and politician
- Tommaso Pio Boggiani (1863–1942), Cardinal of the Roman Catholic Church
- Tommaso Boggio (1877–1963), Italian mathematician
- Tommaso Bona (16th century), Italian painter of the Renaissance period
- Tommaso Boni (born 1993), Italian rugby union player
- Tommaso Brancaccio (1621–1677), Roman Catholic prelate
- Tommaso Brugnami (born 2006), Italian artistic gymnast
- Tommaso Buscetta (1928–2000), Sicilian mafioso

=== C ===
- Tommaso Caccini (1574–1648), Italian Dominican friar and preacher
- Tommaso Campailla (1668–1740), Italian philosopher, doctor, politician, poet and teacher
- Tommaso Campana (fl. 1620–1640), Italian painter active during the Baroque
- Tommaso Campanella (1568–1639), Dominican friar
- Tommaso Cancellotti (born 1992), Italian football defender
- Tommaso Caputo (born 1950), Italian Catholic Bishop and Diplomat
- Tommaso Caracciolo (1572–1631), Field Marshal who commanded parts of the Spanish forces
- Tommaso Caracciolo (disambiguation), multiple people
- Tommaso Carafa (1588–1664), Roman Catholic prelate
- Tommaso Carletti (1860–1919), Governor of Italian Somalia
- Tommaso Cascella (1890–1968), Italian painter, known for brightly colored landscapes
- Tommaso Caudera (born 1907), Italian footballer
- Tommaso dei Cavalieri (1509–1587), Italian nobleman
- Tommaso Cazzaniga (born 1998), Italian football player
- Tommaso Ceccarelli (born 1992), Italian footballer
- Tommaso Ceva (1648–1737), Italian Jesuit mathematician
- Tommaso Chiecchi (born 1979), Italian football defender
- Tommaso Chieffi (born 1961), Italian yacht racer
- Tommaso Ciampa (born 1985), American professional wrestler
- Tommaso Coletti (born 1984), Italian football midfielder
- Tommaso Colombaretti (born 1980), Italian football defender
- Tommaso Conca (1734–1822), Italian painter and draftsman
- Tommaso Condulmier (1759–1823), Italian noble and admiral
- Tommaso da Cori (1655–1729), Italian Roman Catholic priest
- Tommaso Corsini (1835–1919), Italian politician who was mayor of Florence
- Tommaso Costa (1634–1690), Italian painter of the Baroque period
- Tommaso Costanzi (1700–1747), Italian gem engraver of the late-Baroque period
- Tommaso Costantino (1885–1950), Italian fencer
- Tommaso Crudeli (1702–1745), Florentine free thinker

=== D ===
- Tommaso D'Apice (born 1988), Italian rugby union footballer
- Tommaso Debenedetti (born 1969), Italian journalist and author
- Tommaso Del Lungo (born 2003), Italian footballer
- Tommaso Dingli (1591–1666), Maltese architect and sculptor
- Tommaso Diplovataccio (1468–1541), Greco-Italian jurist, publisher and politician
- Tommaso Dolabella (1570–1650), Baroque Italian painter from Venice
- Tommaso Domini (born 1989), Italian football midfielder
- Tommaso D'Orsogna (born 1990), Australian freestyle swimmer
- Tommaso Dossi (1678–1730), Italian painter of the late-Baroque period
- Tommaso Dotti (born 1993), Italian male short track speed skater

=== F ===
- Tommaso Fazello (1498–1570), Italian Dominican friar, historian and antiquarian
- Tommaso Foti (born 1960), Italian politician
- Tommaso Maria Fusco (1831–1891), Italian Roman Catholic priest

=== G ===
- Tommaso Gabellini (born 2006), Italian professional footballer
- Tommaso Gabrielli (born 1992), Italian motorcycle racer
- Tommaso Gaffi (1667–1744), Italian baroque composer
- Tommaso del Garbo (c. 1305–1370), professor of medicine in Perugia and Bologna
- Tommaso Gasparotti (1785–1847), Italian poet, painter, paleographist and bibibliophile archivist
- Tommaso Gazzarini (1790–1853), Italian painter who painted religious and historic subjects
- Tommaso Geraci (born 1931), Italian sculptor
- Tommaso Gherardini (1715–1797), Italian painter of Rococo fresco decorations
- Tommaso Ghinassi (born 1987), Italian football defender
- Tommaso Ghirardi (born 1975), Italian businessman
- Tommaso Gianazza (born 2002), Italian water polo player
- Tommaso Giordani, Italian composer active in England and Ireland
- Tommaso Pasquale Gizzi (1787–1849), Italian prelate
- Tommaso Goi (born 1990), Italian ice hockey player
- Tommaso Grossi (1791–1853), Italian poet and novelist
- Tommaso Guzzoni (1632–1704), Roman Catholic prelate

=== I ===
- Tommaso Iannone (born 1990), Italian rugby union player
- Tommaso Imperato (1596–1656), Roman Catholic prelate
- Tommaso Inghirami (1470–1516), Renaissance humanist and a deacon of the Catholic Church

=== J ===
- Tommaso Juglaris (1844–1925), Italian painter

=== L ===
- Tommaso Labranca (1962–2016), Italian essayist, novelist, journalist, writer, and radio presenter
- Tommaso Lancisi (1603–1682), Italian painter, active in a Baroque style
- Tommaso Landolfi (1908–1979), Italian author, translator and literary critic
- Tommaso Laureti (c. 1530—1602), Italian painter
- Tommaso Leoni (born 1991), Italian snowboarder, specializing in snowboard cross
- Tommaso Lequio di Assaba (1893–1965), Italian horse rider
- Tommaso Lomonaco (1901–1992), Italian aeronautical scientist
- Tommaso Lorenzetti (born 1985), Italian motorcycle racer
- Tommaso Luini, Italian painter of the Baroque period

=== M ===
- Tommaso Maestrelli (1922–1976), Italian football midfielder and manager
- Tommaso Malombra (died 1513), Roman Catholic prelate
- Tommaso Malvito (died 1524), Italian sculptor
- Tommaso Marchesi (1773–1852), Italian composer
- Tommaso Marconi (born 1982), Italian diver
- Tommaso Maressa (born 2004), Italian footballer
- Tommaso Marolda (born 1981), Italian footballer
- Tommaso Martinelli (1827–1888), Cardinal of the Roman Catholic Church
- Tommaso Martini (1688–1755), Italian painter of the late-Baroque period
- Tommaso Mattei (17th century), Italian architect
- Tommaso del Mazza (fl. 1377–1392), Italian painter
- Tommaso de Mezzo (born c. 1447), Venetian noble and playwright
- Tommaso Minardi (1787–1871), Italian painter and author
- Tommaso Misciroli (1636–1699), Italian painter of the Baroque period
- Tommaso Mocenigo (1343–1423), doge of Venice
- Tommaso da Modena (1326–1379), Italian painter
- Tommaso Montano (born 1953), Italian fencer
- Tommaso Morganti (died 1419), Roman Catholic prelate
- Tommaso Morlino (1925–1983), Italian Christian Democrat politician
- Tommaso Mosca (born 2000), Italian racing driver

=== N ===
- Tommaso Napoli (1659–1725), Italian architect, Dominican Order monk, engineer and mathematician
- Tommaso Nardini (1658–1718), Italian priest and painter of the Baroque period
- Tommaso Neri (born 2001), Italian actor

=== O ===
- Tommaso degli Obizzi (1750–1803), Italian art collector
- Tommaso d'Ocra (died 1300), Italian monk and Roman Catholic Cardinal
- Tommaso da Olera (1563–1631), Roman Catholic Italian professed religious from the Order of Friars Minor Capuchin
- Tommaso Orsini (died 1576), Roman Catholic prelate
- Tommaso Ottomano (born 1990), Italian musician, record producer and filmmaker
- Tommaso Oxilia (born 1998), Italian basketball player

=== P ===
- Tommaso Padoa-Schioppa (1940–2010), Italian banker and economist
- Tommaso Palamidessi (1915–1983), Italian esotericist
- Tommaso Perelli (1704–1783), Italian astronomer
- Tommaso di Piero (1464–1529), Italian painter
- Tommaso Pincio, Italian author
- Tommaso Pollace (1748–1830), Italian painter
- Tommaso Portinari (died 1501), Italian banker for the Medici bank
- Tommaso Dal Pozzo (1862–1906), Italian painter and ceramist
- Tommaso de Pra (born 1938), Italian road bicycle race
- Tommaso Puccini (1749-1811), Italian art historian

=== R ===
- Tommaso Raggio (1531—1599), Jesuit missionary
- Tommaso Realfonso (18th century), Italian painter
- Tommaso Reato (born 1984), Italian rugby union player
- Tommaso Redi (1665–1726), Italian painter
- Tommaso Reggio (1818–1901), Italian Roman Catholic prelate
- Tommaso Riario Sforza (1782–1857), Neapolitan Cardinal
- Tommaso Riccardi (1844–1915), Italian Roman Catholic priest
- Tommaso Righi (1727–1802), Italian sculptor and stuccator
- Tommaso Rinaldi (born 1991), Italian diver
- Tommaso Rinuccini (1596–1682), Italian noble and diplomat
- Tommaso Rocchi (born 1977), Italian footballer
- Tommaso Romito (born 1982), Italian footballer
- Tommaso de Rosa (1621–1695), Roman Catholic prelate
- Tommaso Rubino (born 2006), Italian footballer
- Tommaso Ruffo (1663–1753), Italian archbishop of Ferrara and Cardinal
- Tommaso Ruggeri (born 1947), Italian mathematical physicist and professor

=== S ===
- Tommaso Saccardi (born 2001), Italian alpine skier
- Tommaso Salini (1575–1625), Italian painter of the early-Baroque period
- Tommaso Salvadori (1835–1923), Italian zoologist and ornithologist
- Tommaso Salvini (1829–1915), Italian actor
- Tommaso da San Cipriano (fl. 1519–1527), Roman Catholic prelate
- Tommaso Sandrini (1575–1631), Italian painter, active in painting quadratura in Northern Italy
- Tommaso Sandrino (1575–1630), Italian painter
- Tommaso de Sarria (1606–1682), Roman Catholic prelate
- Tommaso Scotti (died 1566), Roman Catholic prelate
- Tommaso Scuffia (born 1991), Italian football goalkeeper
- Tommaso di Sicilia (died 1526), Roman Catholic prelate
- Tommaso Ugi di Siena (14th-century), Italian adventurer
- Tommaso Silvestri (born 1991), Italian footballer
- Tommaso Solari (1820–1889), Italian sculptor active in a Romantic-style
- Tommaso Sperandio Corbelli (died 1590), Roman Catholic prelate
- Tommaso de Stefani (c. 1250–c. 1310), Italian painter of the Renaissance period
- Tommaso di Stefano (1324-1369), Italian painter in Florence
- Tommaso degli Stefani (1231–1310), Italian artist, working in Naples
- Tommaso Stella (died 1566), Roman Catholic prelate
- Tommaso Struzzieri (1706–1780), Roman Catholic prelate

=== T ===
- Tommaso Tamburini (1591–1675), Italian Jesuit moral theologian
- Tommaso Temanza (1705–1789), Italian architect and author
- Tommaso Tittoni (1855–1931), Italian diplomat, politician and Knight of the Annunziata
- Tommaso Toffoli, professor of electrical and computer engineering
- Tommaso Tommasina (1855–1935), Italian painter and sculptor
- Tommaso Traetta (1727–1779), Italian composer
- Tommaso Traversa (born 1990), Italian ice hockey player
- Tommaso Turco (died 1649), Master of the Order of Preachers

=== V ===
- Tommaso Vailatti (born 1986), Italian footballer
- Tommaso Valletti, Italian professor of economics
- Tommaso de Vigilia (fl. 1480–1497), Italian painter of the Renaissance period
- Tommaso Vincidor (1493–1536), Italian Renaissance painter and architect
- Tommaso Vitale, Italian sociologist and academic
- Tommaso De Vivo (1787–1884), Italian painter active mainly in Naples

=== X ===
- Tommaso Ximenes (died 1633), Roman Catholic prelate who served as Bishop of Fiesole

=== Z ===
- Tommaso Zafferani (born 1996), Sammarinese footballer
- Tommaso Ziffer, Italian architect and interior designer
- Tommaso Maria Zigliara (1833–1893), Roman Catholic priest of the Dominican Order

== Surname ==
- Bruno Tommaso (born 1946), Italian jazz double-bass player and composer
- Niccolò di Tommaso (active 1346–1376), Italian painter
- Tony de Tommaso (born 1951), Italian racing driver

== See also ==
- Tomaso
- Tomasso
- Masotti, surname derived from Tommaso
- Di Tommaso, surname
