= Campana =

Campana (Italian and Spanish for "bell") may refer to:

== Places ==
- Campana Partido, Argentina, a partido (administrative subdivision) in Buenos Aires Province
  - Campana, Buenos Aires Province, a city in Campana Partido
- Campana Island, Capitán Prat Province, Aisén, Chile
- La Campana National Park, Quillota Province, Valparaíso, Chile
  - Cerro La Campana, a mountain within the park
- Campana, Haute-Corse, France, a commune in Corsica
- Lac du Campana, France, a lake in Hautes-Pyrénées
- Campana, Calabria, Italy, a town and comune in the Province of Cosenza
- La Campana (archaeological site), near Colima, Mexico
- Campana, Panama, a corregimiento (administrative subdivision)
- La Campana, Spain, a city in the Province of Seville, Andalusia
- Campana, California, United States, an unincorporated community
- Campana, Uruguay, a village in Colonia Department

== Other uses ==
- Campana (surname), a list of people with the surname Campana or Campaña
- Campana, a bell-shaped core of a Corinthian capital in architecture
- Campana (musical instrument), a bell used as an orchestral instrument
- The Campana Company, a former manufacturer of cosmetics
  - Campana Factory, a historic factory in Kane County, Illinois, United States

== See also ==
- Via Campana, one of the main roads of the Roman Empire
- Campana relief, a Roman terracotta relief panel
- Campanology
