= Cazzaniga =

Cazzaniga (pronounced [kattsaˈniːɡa]) is an Italian surname from Milan and Monza and Brianza, derived from the town of Gazzaniga or other toponyms in northwestern Lombardy. Notable people with the surname include:

- Alicia Cazzaniga (1928–1968), Argentine modernist architect
- Ignazio Cazzaniga (1911–1974), Italian classical philologist and academic
- Leonardo Cazzaniga (born 1956), Italian serial killer and former anesthesiologist
- Mario Cazzaniga (1900–?), Italian water polo player
- Tommaso Cazzaniga (born 1998), Italian football player

== See also ==
- Gazzaniga (surname)
