= 2025–26 FIS Alpine Ski Europa Cup =

Alpine skiing competition

Discipline	Men	Women
Overall	(Switzerland) Lenz Hächler	(Italy) Alice Pazzaglia
Downhill	(France) Ken Caillot	(Switzerland) Stefanie Grob
Super-G	(Switzerland) Lenz Hächler	(Italy) Sara Allemand
Giant slalom	(Switzerland) Sandro Zurbrügg	(Switzerland) Dania Allenbach
Slalom	(France) Hugo Desgrippes	(Italy) Alice Pazzaglia

Competition
Edition	55th	55th
Locations	19	15
Individual	37	32
Cancelled	4	2
Rescheduled	2	1

The 2025–26 FIS Alpine Ski Europa Cup, organised by the International Ski Federation (FIS) is the 55th consecutive Europa Cup season, the second international level competition in alpine skiing.

The season started on 21 November 2025 in Levi, Finland, and will conclude on 25 March 2026 in Schladming, Austria.

== Men ==
=== Calendar ===
Stage	Date	Place	Discipline	Winner	Second	Third	Ref.
1	21 November 2025	(Finland) Levi	Slalom	(Sweden) William Hansson	(Switzerland) Matthias Iten	(Austria) Jakob Greber	
2	23 November 2025	(Sweden) Storklinten	Slalom	(Norway) Hans Grahl-Madsen	(Austria) Jakob Greber	(Sweden) Adam Hofstedt	
3	4 December 2025	(Switzerland) Zinal	Giant slalom	(Norway) Hans Grahl-Madsen	(Italy) Tobias Kastlunger	(Italy) Simon Talacci	
4	5 December 2025	(Switzerland) Zinal	Giant slalom	(Finland) Eduard Hallberg	(Italy) Tobias Kastlunger	(Switzerland) Sandro Zurbrügg	
5	10 December 2025	(Italy) Santa Caterina	Super-G	(Austria) Felix Hacker	(Spain) Ander Mintegui	(Switzerland) Marco Kohler	
6	12 December 2025	(Italy) Santa Caterina	Downhill	(Italy) Max Perathoner	(Switzerland) Sandro Manser	(Switzerland) Alessio Miggiano	
7	13 December 2025	(Italy) Santa Caterina	Downhill	(Switzerland) Alessio Miggiano	(Switzerland) Sandro Manser	(France) Ken Caillot	
8	16 December 2025	(France) Valloire	Giant slalom	(United Kingdom) Freddy Carrick-Smith	(Norway) Hans Grahl-Madsen	(Finland) Eduard Hallberg	
9	17 December 2025	(France) Valloire	Giant slalom	(Switzerland) Sandro Zurbrügg	(Italy) Tobias Kastlunger	(Italy) Simon Talacci	
10	19 December 2025	(Italy) Obereggen	Slalom	(Norway) Hans Grahl-Madsen	(Switzerland) Sandro Simonet	(France) Hugo Desgrippes (Austria) Jakob Greber	
11	20 December 2025	(Italy) Val di Fassa	Slalom	(France) Auguste Aulnette	(Italy) Tommaso Saccardi	(France) Hugo Desgrippes	
	9 January 2026	(Switzerland) Wengen	Super-G	cancelled, moved to Pass Thurn on 16 January			
	10 January 2026	(Switzerland) Wengen	Super-G	cancelled, moved to Verbier on 27 January			
12	13 January 2026	(Switzerland) Crans-Montana	Slalom	(Belgium) Armand Marchant	(Switzerland) Sandro Simonet	(Norway) Hans Grahl-Madsen	
13	14 January 2026	(Switzerland) Crans-Montana	Slalom	(France) Antoine Azzolin	(France) Auguste Aulnette	(Italy) Tommaso Saccardi	
14	(Note: Men's cancelled super-G from Wengen was rescheduled to Pass Thurn on 16 January 2026.)16 January 2026	(Austria) Pass Thurn	Super-G	(Austria) Fabian Bachler	(Switzerland) Lenz Hächler	(France) Charles Gamel Seigneur	
15	18 January 2026	(Austria) Pass Thurn	Downhill	(Switzerland) Gaël Zulauf	(France) Ken Caillot	(Germany) Felix Rösle	
16	19 January 2026	(Austria) Pass Thurn	Downhill	(France) Ken Caillot	(Switzerland) Lenz Hächler	(Italy) Marco Abbruzzese	
17	21 January 2026	(Austria) Turnau	Giant slalom	(Switzerland) Fadri Janutin	(Austria) Noel Zwischenbrugger	(Switzerland) Sandro Zurbrügg	
18	22 January 2026	(Austria) Turnau	Giant slalom	(Switzerland) Sandro Zurbrügg	(Norway) Hans Grahl-Madsen	(Italy) Simon Talacci	
19	(Note: Rescheduled from 30 January 2026)26 January 2026	(Switzerland) Verbier	Super-G	(Switzerland) Lenz Hächler	(Switzerland) Gaël Zulauf	(Switzerland) Arnaud Boisset	
20	(Note: Men's cancelled super-G from Wengen was rescheduled to Verbier on 27 January 2026.)27 January 2026	(Switzerland) Verbier	Super-G	(Austria) Manuel Traninger	(Switzerland) Lenz Hächler	(Switzerland) Livio Hiltbrand	
21	(Note: Rescheduled from 28 January 2026)29 January 2026	(Switzerland) Verbier	Downhill	(Switzerland) Alessio Miggiano	(Switzerland) Gaël Zulauf	(Austria) Luis Tritscher	
22	(Note: Rescheduled from 29 January 2026)30 January 2026	(Switzerland) Verbier	Downhill	(Switzerland) Philipp Kälin	(Norway) Simen Sellæg	(France) Ken Caillot	
23	3 February 2026	(Spain) Baqueira-Beret	Slalom	(France) Hugo Desgrippes	(Italy) Tommaso Saccardi	(Austria) Jakob Greber	
24	4 February 2026	(Spain) Baqueira-Beret	Slalom	(Italy) Tommaso Saccardi	(France) Hugo Desgrippes	(France) Antoine Azzolin	
25	14 February 2026	(Germany) Berchtesgaden	Giant slalom	(Austria) Joshua Sturm	(United States) Bridger Gile	(Switzerland) Fadri Janutin	
	15 February 2026	(Germany) Berchtesgaden	Slalom	cancelled			
26	18 February 2026	(Bosnia and Herzegovina) Bjelašnica	Super-G	(Switzerland) Lenz Hächler	(Austria) Manuel Traninger	(Norway) Tollef Haugen	
27	18 February 2026	(Bosnia and Herzegovina) Bjelašnica	Super-G	(Switzerland) Lars Hösti	(Switzerland) Alessio Miggiano	(Norway) Simen Sellæg	
28	23 February 2026	(Norway) Norefjell	Giant slalom	(Switzerland) Fadri Janutin	(Switzerland) Sandro Zurbrügg	(Italy) Tobias Kastlunger	
29	24 February 2026	(Norway) Norefjell	Giant slalom	(Switzerland) Lenz Hächler	(Switzerland) Fadri Janutin	(France) Guerlain Favre	
30	27 February 2026	(Norway) Oppdal	Downhill	(France) Ken Caillot	(Italy) Gregorio Bernardi	(Switzerland) Philipp Kälin	
	27 February 2026	(Norway) Oppdal	Downhill	cancelled			
31	28 February 2026	(Norway) Oppdal	Super-G	(Switzerland) Lenz Hächler	(Switzerland) Delio Kunz	(France) Adrien Fresquet	
32	20 March 2026	(Austria) Saalbach	Downhill	(Switzerland) Sandro Manser	(Switzerland) Lenz Hächler	(Switzerland) Philipp Kälin	
33	22 March 2026	(Austria) Saalbach	Super-G	(Austria) Manuel Traninger	(Switzerland) Lenz Hächler	(France) Adrien Fresquet	
34	24 March 2026	(Austria) Schladming	Giant slalom	(Norway) Hans Grahl-Madsen	(France) Guerlain Favre	(Norway) Halvor Hilde Gunleiksrud	
35	25 March 2026	(Austria) Schladming	Slalom	(Switzerland) Ramon Zenhäusern	(France) Hugo Desgrippes	(Austria) Adrian Pertl	

=== Rankings ===
==== Overall ====
Rank	after all 35 events	Points
1	(Switzerland) Lenz Hächler	1000
2	(Norway) Hans Grahl-Madsen	818
3	(Switzerland) Sandro Zurbrügg	605
4	(Switzerland) Fadri Janutin	526
5	(Switzerland) Gaël Zulauf	516

==== Downhill ====
Rank	after all 8 events	Points
1	(France) Ken Caillot	433
2	(Switzerland) Sandro Manser	418
3	(Switzerland) Gaël Zulauf	277
4	(Switzerland) Lenz Hächler	276
5	(Italy) Max Perathoner	266

==== Super-G ====
Rank	after all 8 events	Points
1	(Switzerland) Lenz Hächler	591
2	(Austria) Manuel Traninger	354
3	(France) Adrien Fresquet	257
4	(Switzerland) Lars Hösti	251
5	(Switzerland) Gaël Zulauf	239

==== Giant slalom ====
Rank	after all 10 events	Points
1	(Switzerland) Sandro Zurbrügg	525
2	(Switzerland) Fadri Janutin	485
3	(Norway) Hans Grahl-Madsen	468
4	(Italy) Tobias Kastlunger	441
5	(Italy) Simon Talacci	353

==== Slalom ====
Rank	after all 9 events	Points
1	(France) Hugo Desgrippes	430
2	(France) Auguste Aulnette	374
3	(Italy) Tommaso Saccardi	370
4	(Norway) Hans Grahl-Madsen (Note: Based on the tie-breaker criteria, Grahl-Madsen finished ahead of Greber in the overall ranking.)	350
5	(Austria) Jakob Greber	350

== Women ==
=== Calendar ===
Stage	Date	Place	Discipline	Winner	Second	Third	Ref.
1	1 December 2025	(Switzerland) Zinal	Giant slalom	(Italy) Laura Steinmair	(Italy) Sophie Mathiou	(Italy) Carole Agnelli	
2	2 December 2025	(Switzerland) Zinal	Giant slalom	(Italy) Ambra Pomarè	(Italy) Alice Pazzaglia	(Germany) Jana Fritz	
3	6 December 2025	(Austria) Mayrhofen / Hippach	Giant slalom	(Italy) Alice Pazzaglia	(Italy) Carole Agnelli	(Italy) Laura Steinmair	
4	7 December 2025	(Austria) Mayrhofen / Hippach	Slalom	(Italy) Giulia Valleriani	(Austria) Leonie Raich	(Switzerland) Aline Danioth	
5	17 December 2025	(Switzerland) St. Moritz	Downhill	(Austria) Anna Schilcher	(Switzerland) Stefanie Grob	(Norway) Inni Holm Wembstad	
6	18 December 2025	(Switzerland) St. Moritz	Downhill	(Austria) Leonie Zegg	(Austria) Anna Schilcher	(Italy) Sara Thaler	
7	19 December 2025	(Italy) Ahrntal	Slalom	(Switzerland) Aline Höpli	(Austria) Natalie Falch	(Italy) Beatrice Sola	
8	20 December 2025	(Italy) Ahrntal	Slalom	(United States) Liv Moritz	(Sweden) Estelle Alphand	(Italy) Giulia Valleriani	
9	9 January 2026	(Italy) Sestriere	Giant slalom	(Austria) Nina Astner	(Switzerland) Dania Allenbach	(Sweden) Hilma Lövblom	
10	10 January 2026	(Italy) Sestriere	Giant slalom	(Switzerland) Sue Piller	(Sweden) Hilma Lövblom	(Italy) Laura Steinmair	
11	14 January 2026	(Austria) Pass Thurn	Downhill	(Italy) Sara Allemand	(Austria) Anna Schilcher	(Austria) Leonie Zegg	
12	15 January 2026	(Austria) Pass Thurn	Downhill	(Switzerland) Stefanie Grob	(France) Garance Meyer	(Norway) Eva Unhjem Johansen	
13	19 January 2026	(Austria) St. Anton	Super-G	(Italy) Sara Allemand	(Norway) Marte Monsen	(Austria) Lena Wechner	
14	20 January 2026	(Austria) St. Anton	Super-G	(Italy) Sara Allemand	(Norway) Marte Monsen	(Austria) Vanessa Nußbaumer	
15	23 January 2026	(France) Chamonix (Note: Night event)	Slalom	(Italy) Alice Pazzaglia	(Italy) Francesca Carolli	(Italy) Beatrice Sola	
16	24 January 2026	(France) Chamonix	Slalom	(Italy) Alice Pazzaglia	(Sweden) Moa Landström	(Sweden) Moa Boström Müssener	
17	(Note: Rescheduled from 30 January 2026)26 January 2026	(France) Orcières-Merlette 1850	Super-G	(Germany) Fabiana Dorigo	(Austria) Lisa Grill	(Italy) Sara Allemand	
18	(Note: Rescheduled from 28 January 2026)29 January 2026	(France) Orcières-Merlette 1850	Downhill	(Germany) Fabiana Dorigo	(Finland) Rosa Pohjolainen	(Italy) Sara Thaler	
	(Note: Rescheduled from 29 January 2026, cancelled later)30 January 2026	(France) Orcières-Merlette 1850	Downhill	cancelled			
19	2 February 2026	(Italy) Sarntal	Super-G	(Austria) Nadine Fest	(Austria) Emily Schöpf	(Andorra) Cande Moreno	
20	4 February 2026	(Italy) Sarntal	Super-G	(Austria) Emily Schöpf	(Austria) Lisa Grill	(Austria) Anna Schilcher	
21	7 February 2026	(Germany) Oberjoch	Giant slalom	(Switzerland) Dania Allenbach	(Italy) Sophie Mathiou	(Sweden) Hilma Lövblom	
22	8 February 2026	(Germany) Oberjoch	Giant slalom	(Sweden) Sophie Nyberg	(Italy) Ambra Pomarè	(Italy) Sophie Mathiou	
23	10 February 2026	(Switzerland) Hasliberg	Slalom	(Switzerland) Janine Mächler	(Sweden) Moa Landström	(Italy) Alice Pazzaglia	
	11 February 2026	(Switzerland) Hasliberg	Slalom	cancelled, moved to Sundsvall on 27 February			
24	24 February 2026	(Norway) Oppdal	Giant slalom	(Switzerland) Vanessa Kasper	(Italy) Ilaria Ghisalberti	(Austria) Nina Astner	
25	25 February 2026	(Norway) Oppdal	Giant slalom	(Italy) Giorgia Collomb	(Italy) Ilaria Ghisalberti	(Switzerland) Dania Allenbach	
26	(Note: Women's cancelled slalom from Hasliberg was rescheduled to Sundsvall on 27 February 2026.)27 February 2026	(Sweden) Sundsvall	Slalom	(Sweden) Anna Swenn-Larsson	(Italy) Emilia Mondinelli	(Switzerland) Selina Egloff	
27	28 February 2026	(Sweden) Sundsvall	Slalom	(Sweden) Anna Swenn-Larsson	(Switzerland) Janine Mächler	(Italy) Alice Pazzaglia	
28	1 March 2026	(Sweden) Sundsvall	Slalom	(Sweden) Moa Boström Müssener	(Austria) Natalie Falch	(Austria) Nina Astner	
29	20 March 2026	(Austria) Saalbach	Downhill	(Switzerland) Stefanie Grob	(Austria) Lisa Grill	(United States) Haley Cutler	
30	21 March 2026	(Austria) Saalbach	Super-G	(Austria) Nadine Fest	(Switzerland) Stefanie Grob	(Germany) Fabiana Dorigo	
31	24 March 2026	(Austria) Schladming	Giant slalom	(Switzerland) Sue Piller	(Sweden) Sophie Nyberg	(Switzerland) Dania Allenbach	
32	25 March 2026	(Austria) Schladming	Slalom	(Italy) Giulia Valleriani	(Austria) Natalie Falch	(Austria) Leonie Raich	

=== Rankings ===
==== Overall ====
Rank	after all 32 events	Points
1	(Italy) Alice Pazzaglia	936
2	(Switzerland) Stefanie Grob	792
3	(Germany) Fabiana Dorigo	590
4	(Switzerland) Janine Mächler	577
5	(Italy) Sara Allemand	546

==== Downhill ====
Rank	after all 6 events	Points
1	(Switzerland) Stefanie Grob	366
2	(Austria) Anna Schilcher	349
3	(Italy) Sara Thaler	256
4	(Germany) Fabiana Dorigo	254
5	(Austria) Leonie Zegg	215

==== Super-G ====
Rank	after all 6 events	Points
1	(Italy) Sara Allemand	349
2	(Austria) Lisa Grill	286
3	(Austria) Emily Schöpf	262
4	(Germany) Fabiana Dorigo	246
5	(Austria) Lena Wechner	225

==== Giant slalom ====
Rank	after all 10 events	Points
1	(Switzerland) Dania Allenbach	498
2	(Italy) Sophie Mathiou	445
3	(Italy) Alice Pazzaglia	386
4	(Italy) Ambra Pomarè	344
5	(Italy) Laura Steinmair	336

==== Slalom ====
Rank	after all 10 events	Points
1	(Italy) Alice Pazzaglia	550
2	(Italy) Giulia Valleriani	450
3	(Switzerland) Janine Mächler	409
4	(Austria) Natalie Falch	389
5	(Austria) Leonie Raich	358

== Podium table by nation ==
Table showing the Europa Cup podium places (gold–1st place, silver–2nd place, bronze–3rd place) by the countries represented by the athletes.

Rank	Nation	Gold	Silver	Bronze	Total
1	Switzerland	23	20	13	56
2	Italy	13	15	18	46
3	Austria	11	13	12	36
4	France	5	6	9	20
5	Sweden	5	5	4	14
6	Norway	4	5	6	15
7	Germany	2	0	3	5
8	Finland	1	1	1	3
8	United States	1	1	1	3
10	Belgium	1	0	0	1
10	Great Britain	1	0	0	1
12	Spain	0	1	0	1
13	Andorra	0	0	1	1
Totals (13 entries)		67	67	68	202
