= Lancisi =

Lancisi is an Italian surname. It may refer to:

- Giovanni Maria Lancisi, an Italian physician
- Tommaso Lancisi, an Italian painter
