= Cardiognosis =

Christian charism

In Christian theology, cardiognosis (literally Knowledge of the Heart) is a special charism that God confers on some saints. In Christian asceticism, the term Cardiognosis also indicates the ascetical methods and meditation techniques which have the purpose of reaching an inner state of mystical experience and, eventually, the charisma of Cardiognosis.

== Cardiognosis as a supernatural gift ==
Cardiognosis, meaning Knowledge of the Heart in a metaphysical sense, is only used in Scripture as an attribute of the Deity, to God's knowledge of man's heart, never some special knowledge men have deep in their own hearts. Indeed, all knowledge, or thought, is biblically referenced as residing in "the heart," and nowhere else ("May the words of my mouth and the meditations of my heart...(Ps. 19:14)"; "As a man thinks in his heart... (Prov. 23:7)"]. The term is found twice in the New Testament, both times in Acts, and does not appear in the Septuagint.

1: 24 ["Lord, knower of all hearts (cardiognosta)"] καὶ προσευξάμενοι εἶπαν, Σὺ κύριε, καρδιογνῶστα πάντων, ἀνάδειξον ὃν ἐξελέξω ἐκ τούτων τῶν δύο ἕνα. 15: 8 ["the heart-knowing (cardiognostes) God] καὶ ὁ καρδιογνώστης θεὸς ἐμαρτύρησεν αὐτοῖς δοὺς τὸ πνεῦμα τὸ ἅγιον καθὼς καὶ ἡμῖν.

Also of relevance is Proverbs 27:19:

Quomodo in aquis resplendent vultus prospicientium, sic corda hominum manifesta sunt prudentibus.

The Ascent of Mount Carmel by John of the Cross is informative. See II.26,13, and chapter 26 in general:

SII.26,14 es de saber que estos que tienen el espíritu purgado con mucha facilidad naturalmente pueden conocer, y unos más que otros, lo que hay en el corazón o espíritu interior, y las inclinaciones y talentos de las personas; y esto por indicios exteriores, aunque sean muy pequeños, como por palabras, movimientos y otras muestras. Porque, así como el demonio puede esto, porque es espíritu, así tambien lo puede el espiritual, según el dicho del Apóstol (1 Cor. 2:15) que dice: Spiritualis autem iudicat omnia: El espiritual todas las cosas juzga. Y otra vez (1 Cor. 2:10) dice: Spiritus enim omnia scrutatur, etiam profunda Dei: El espíritu todas las cosas penetra, hasta las cosas profundas de Dios. De donde, aunque naturalmente no pueden los espirituales conocer los pensamientos o lo que hay en el interior, por ilustración sobrenatural o por indicios bien lo pueden entender. Y aunque en el conocimiento por indicios muchas veces se pueden engañar, las más veces aciertan. Mas ni de lo uno ni de lo otro hay que fiarse, porque el demonio se entremete aquí grandemente y con mucha sutileza, como luego diremos; y así siempre se han de renunciar las tales inteligencias (y noticias).

The supernatural gift of Cardiognosis leads the saint, who received it, to establish in his heart an inner dialogue and an inner knowledge of God. This mystical experience is often described by Christian saints as the perceiving of the Inner Light of Christ.

== Cardiognosis as an ascetical method ==
The term Cardiognosis is also used to indicate the ascetical methods and meditations which lead to the Knowledge of the Heart. In the Bible, the gift of Cardiognosis is indicated in the speech on the Mountain (Matthew 5:8) "Blessed are the pure of heart for they will see God".

In the hesychast tradition, Cardiognosis is treated in most of the texts of Philokalia (Gk. φιλοκάλειν To Love the Beautiful) as a continuous prayer to God. The same experience is described in another, much shorter, well-known book called The Way of a Pilgrim, in which a Russian traveler learns to pray continuously repeating the name of Jesus.

== Cardiognosis in new movements and thoughts ==
The practice of Cardiognosis has been revived by Tommaso Palamidessi (founder of the Archeosophical Society). Welding the hesychast tradition and the Christian theology with the eastern techniques of yoga meditation, Tommaso Palamidessi developed a new practice of Cardiognosis. This meditation technique is deeply treated in his essay The Mystical Ascesis and Meditation on the Heart. According to the archeosophical teachings, cardiognosis is a method that will establish the experimenter's intelligence illuminated by the Intelligence of Christ in the heart. This technique, according to Palamidessi, will bring to experiment the vision of the Inner Light and constitutes a soft and danger-free way to the awaking of kundalini.

== See also ==
- Philokalia
- Tommaso Palamidessi
- Archeosophy
