= Di Piero =

Di Piero is an Italian surname. Notable people with the surname include:

- Meo di Piero (active 1356–1407), Italian painter
- Tommaso di Piero (1464–1529), Italian painter
- W. S. Di Piero (born 1945), American poet, translator, essayist, and educator
