= Linde Freya Tangelder =

Belgian / Dutch artist and furniture designer

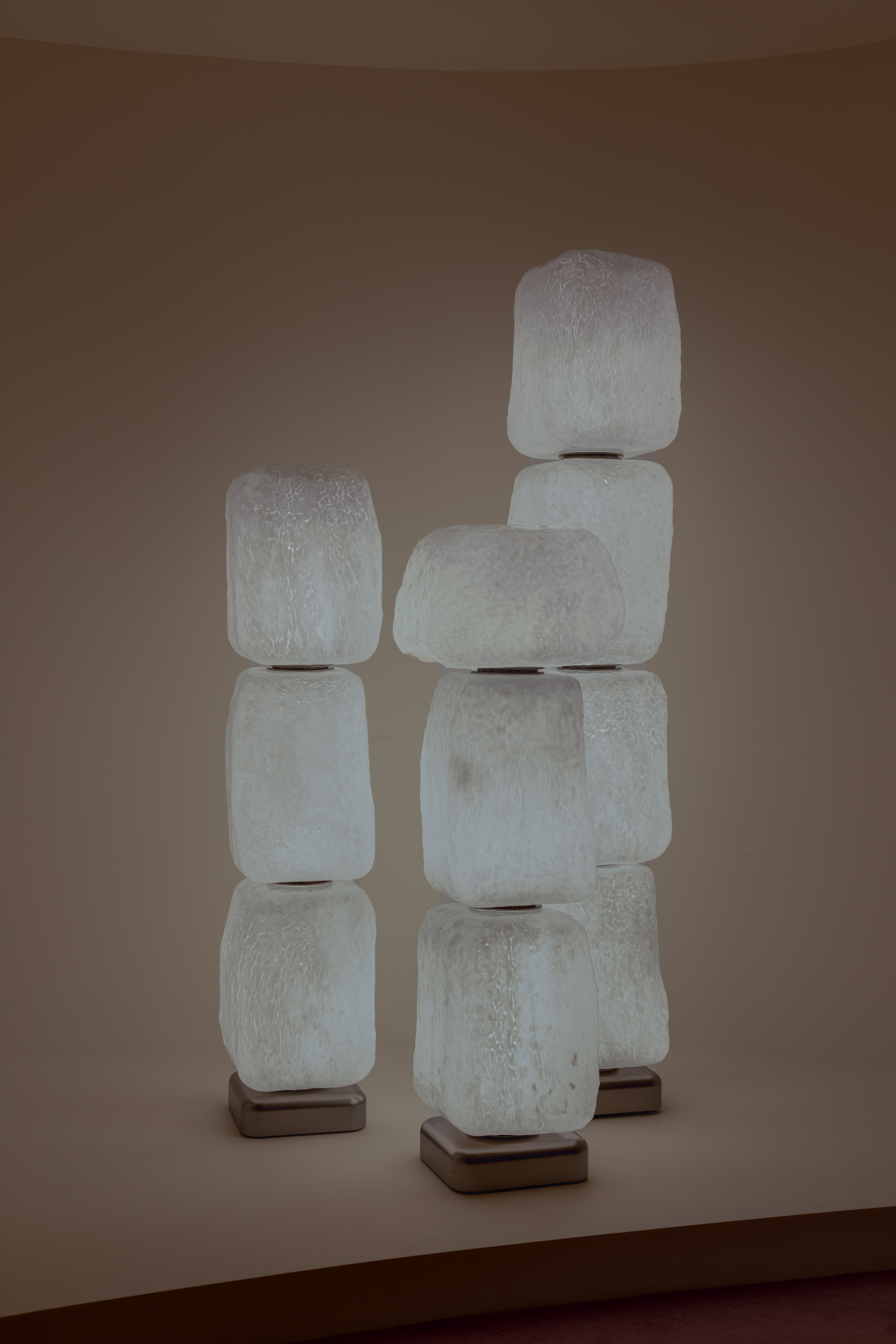
Wax Stone Light for Cassina

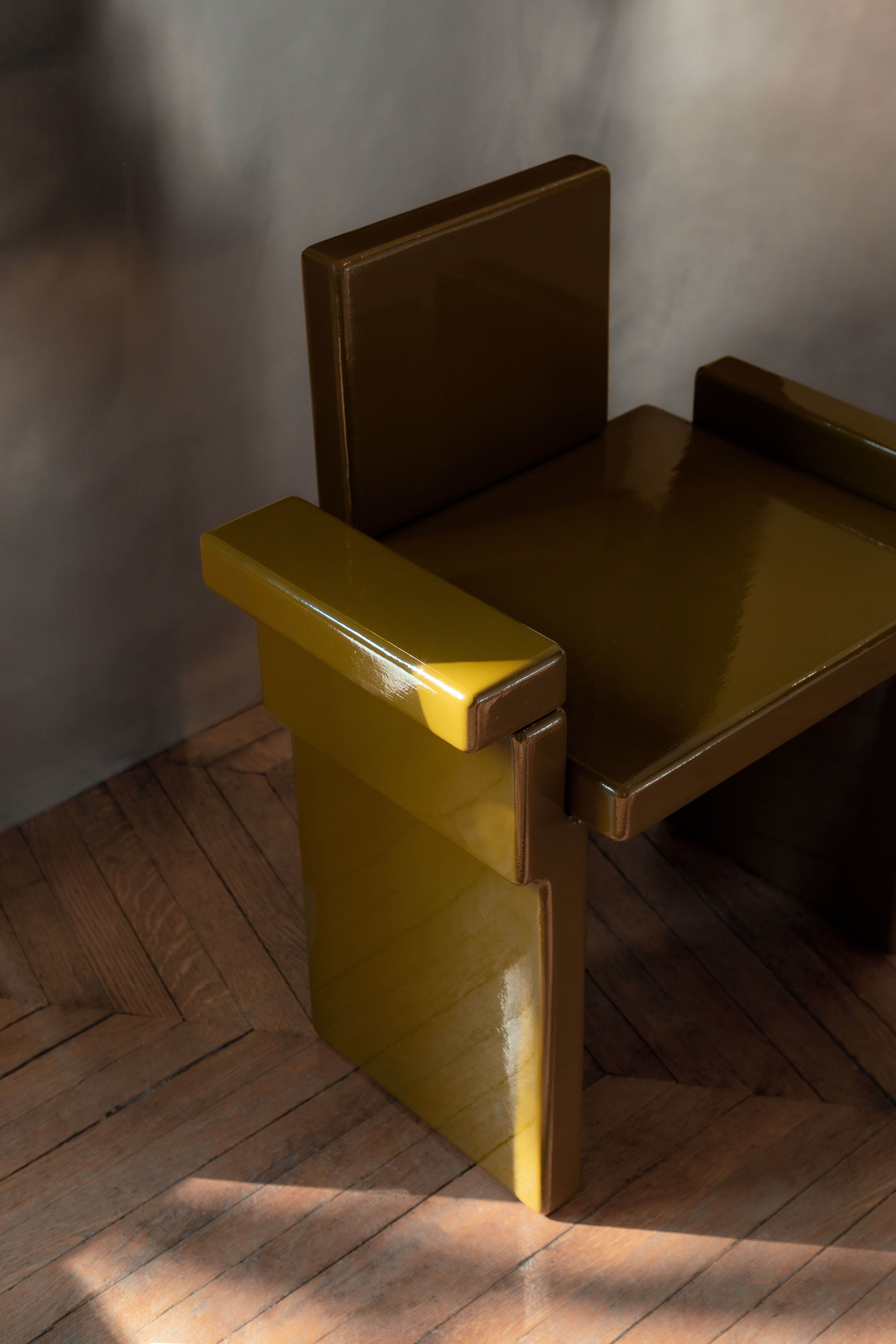
Lacquered Chair

Linde Freya Tangelder (born 6 October 1987, in Doetinchem, The Netherlands) is a Dutch artist, furniture designer and interior designer based in Belgium. She is the founder of the design studio Destroyers/Builders, which takes inspiration from human interactions with architectural elements, materials, or building techniques. Her designs are research-based and strive to find a balance between contemporary and traditional elements.

== Education ==
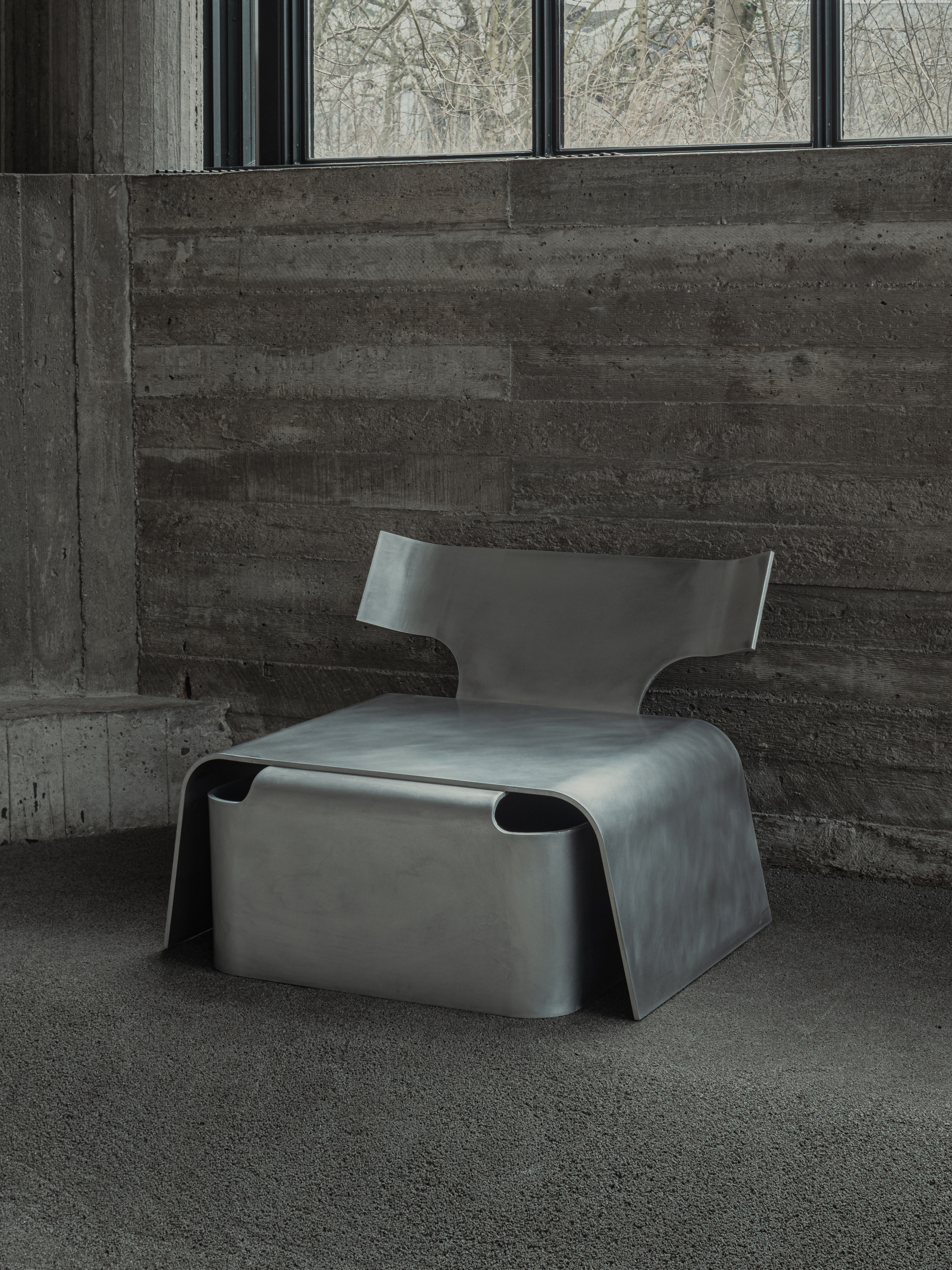
Low Chair

In 2011, while in the midst of her studies, Tangelder did an internship at the Unfold Design Studio in Antwerp where she was impressed by the studio's pioneering in 3D clay printing but also discovered that her own interests resonated more in working with her hands. Before graduating, she did another internship at Campana Brothers in São Paulo, Brazil.

== Career ==
After graduating in 2014, Tangelder founded Destroyers/Builders and decided to focus on limited productions. While starting up her studio she gained experience at Maniera Gallery in Brussels.

In 2017, Tangelder was a founding member of the design collective BRUT. The designers shared their practices and found similarities and inspiration from one another and decided to join forces. The collective exists out of Charlotte Jonckheer, Nel Verbeke, Ben Storms and Bram Vanderbeke.

== Prizes ==
- In 2019, Tangelder was named Designer of the Year by Biennale Interieur in Belgium.
- In 2019, the collective BRUT was awarded the Henry van de Velde Young Talent Award.
- in 2023, Tangelder was awarded with the Edida Young Design Talent of the Year.

== Sources ==
- Laura Martens, Linde Freya Tangelder Interview - Nov 2020 (audio)
