= Campana (surname) =

Campana or Campaña (Spanish for "campaign" or occasionally "countryside") is a surname. Notable people with the surname include:

- Al Campana (1926–2009), American National Football League running back
- Alex Campana (born 1988), English footballer
- Cosetta Campana (born 1961), Italian former sprinter
- Dino Campana (1885–1932), Italian poet
- Drake Campana (born 1986), stage name of American musician and actor Drake Bell
- Fabio Campana (1819–1882), Italian composer, opera director, conductor and singing teacher
- Fernando Campana (born 1961), half of the Campana brothers, Brazilian designers
- Francesca Campana (c. 1615 – 1665), Roman singer, spinet player and composer
- Francesco Campana (c. 1494 – 1546), Italian statesman
- Francesco Federico or François Frédéric Campana (1771–1807), Italian general in Napoleon's army
- Giacinto Campana (born c. 1600), Italian painter of the Baroque period
- Giampietro Campana (1808–1880), Italian art collector and embezzler
- Giorgia Campana (born 1995), Italian artistic gymnast
- Héctor Campana (born 1964), Argentine former basketball player and former vice-governor of Córdoba Province
- Humberto Campana (born 1953), half of the Campana brothers, Brazilian designers
- José Campaña (born 1993), Spanish footballer
- Loris Campana (1926–2015), Italian road bicycle and track cyclist
- Martín Campaña (born 1989), Uruguayan footballer
- Pablo Campana (born 1972), Ecuadorian former tennis player
- Pedro Campaña (1503–1586), Flemish painter of the Renaissance period
- Pedro Delgado Campaña (fl. 2010s), former Governor of the Central Bank of Ecuador
- Pierre Campana (born 1985), French rally driver
- Pietro Campana (1727–1765), Spanish engraver
- Sergio Campana (footballer) (1934–2025), Italian lawyer and former professional footballer
- Sergio Campana (racing driver) (born 1986), Italian racing driver
- Thomas J. Campana Jr. (1947–2004), American inventor
- Tom Campana (born 1950), American former football player in the Canadian Football League
- Tommaso Campana (fl. 1620–1640), Italian painter active during the Baroque period
- Tony Campana (born 1986), American Major League Baseball outfielder
