= Campana Serenade =

1942-1944 old-time radio music program

- Genre: Popular music
- Running time: 30 minutes
- Country of origin: United States
- Language: English
- Home station: KNX
- Syndicates: NBC (1942-1943); CBS (1943-1944)
- Starring: Dick Powell
- Announcer: Henry Charles
- Original release: October 10, 1942 – February 16, 1944
- Sponsored by: Campana cosmetic company

Campana Serenade is an old-time radio music program in the United States. It was broadcast on NBC from October 10, 1942, to April 10, 1943, and on CBS from September 4, 1943, to February 16, 1944.

Dick Powell starred in both versions of Campana Serenade. The 1942-1943 episodes also featured the Music Maids, with Matty Malneck and his orchestra. Joining Powell in the 1943-1944 programs were singer Martha Tilton and Lud Gluskin and his orchestra. Henry Charles was the announcer.

Originating at KNX in Los Angeles, California, the show was sponsored by Campana, a cosmetics manufacturer, advertising its Campana Balm, Dreskin, Coolies, DDD, and Solitaire Make-Up products.

The trade publication Broadcasting reported that the break in the program's broadcasts resulted from a shortage of glycerine.
