= Gazzaniga (surname) =

Gazzaniga (pronounced [ɡaddzaˈniːɡa]) is an Italian surname from Pavia, derived from the town of Gazzaniga. Notable people with the surname include:

- Gianfranco Gazzaniga (born 1993), Argentine football goalkeeper
- Giuseppe Gazzaniga (1743–1818), Italian composer
- Marietta Gazzaniga (1824–1884), Italian soprano
- Michael Gazzaniga (born 1939), American neuroscientist and academic
- Paulo Gazzaniga (born 1992), Argentine football goalkeeper
- Pietro Maria Gazzaniga (1824–1884), Italian Dominican theologian
- Silvio Gazzaniga (1921–2016), Italian sculptor

== See also ==
- Cazzaniga
