= Campana Factory =

- U.S. National Register of Historic Places
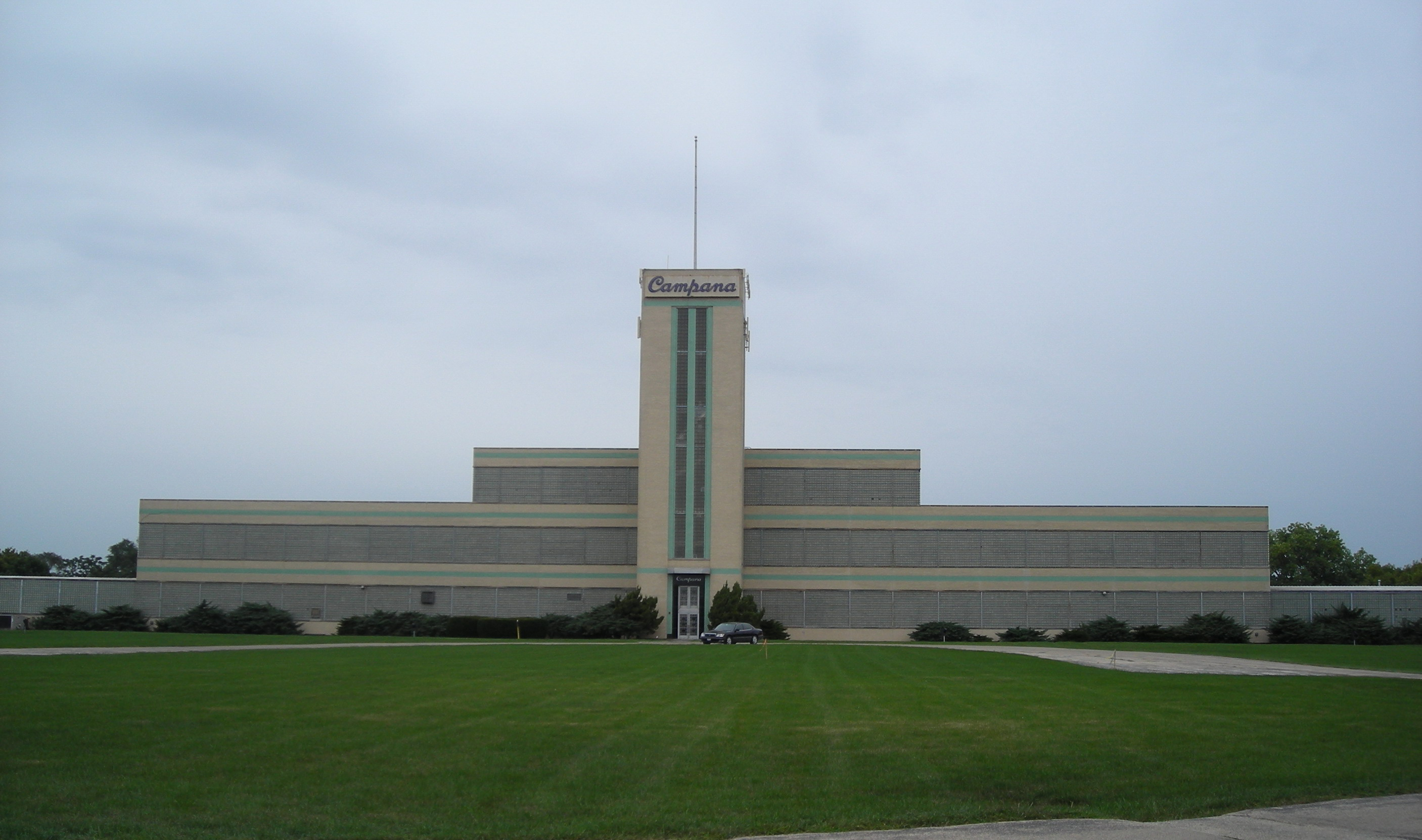

- Location within Illinois Location within the United States
- Location: 901 N Batavia Ave; Batavia, Illinois 60510-1278
- Coordinates: 41°51′54″N 88°18′58″W
- Built: 1936
- Architect: Frank D. Chase; Childs and Smith
- Architectural style: Streamline Moderne, Bauhaus
- NRHP reference No.: 79000841
- Added to NRHP: April 6, 1979

The Campana Factory is a historic building in Batavia, Illinois. It was built in 1936 to serve as a factory for The Campana Company, which produced Italian Balm, the most popular hand lotion in the United States during The Great Depression. The Streamline Moderne and Bauhaus building features many innovative technologies, such as air conditioning. It was added to the National Register of Historic Places in 1979.

== History ==
The Campana Company was a manufacturer of hand lotion, most notably Italian Balm, and other beauty products. Despite the economic hardships of The Great Depression, Campana was prosperous due to an aggressive radio advertising campaign featuring commercials on several hit shows, including The First Nighter Program. Campana also advertised by mailing millions of free samples to potential customers. The company was successful enough to warrant a new factory in 1936. The factory was intended to use the latest technologies and architectural styles to promote its products.

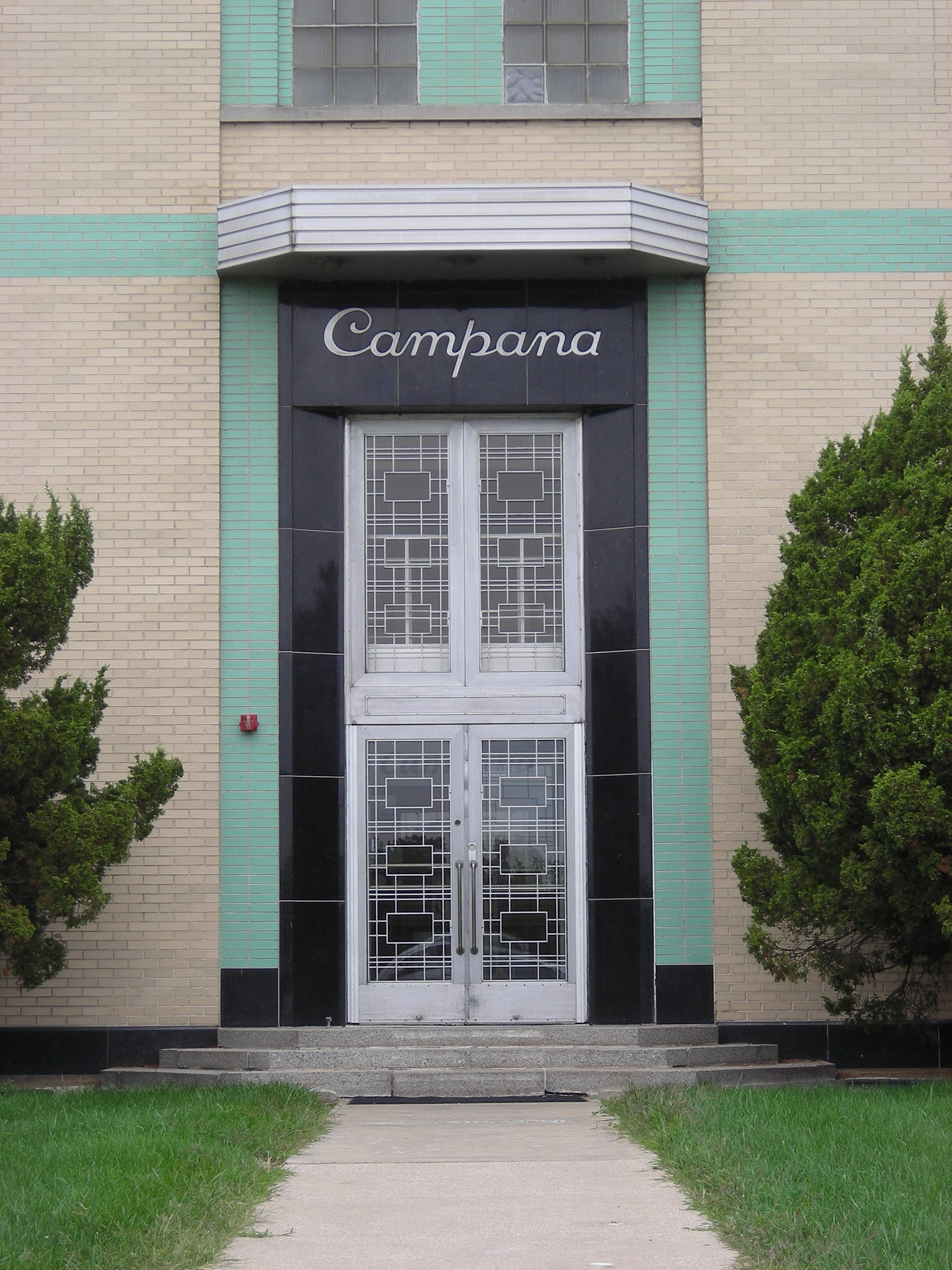
The entrance to the Campana factory.

The Bauhaus and Art Deco inspired building was three stories tall with a central tower rising 100 feet (30 m). The building is in a long, horizontal block, and the third story is half as long as the other two. The floors alternate between tile and glass brick with no mullions. The glass bricks provide interior lightning in lieu of full windows. Horizontal bands of turquoise tile stretch around the building, with vertical bands rising up the tower. The Campana logo is written in gold leaf above the main entrance and in a large, red neon sign near the top of the tower.

Inside, fluorescent lights provide lighting to areas not nearby glass brick. Most walls are painted white or are tiled. The east side of the building was used as a visitors' gallery, where Campana executives could give tours of the building and its product without disturbing the workers. The manufacturing floor was visible through large plate glass windows from this wing. The interior of the tower housed a 50,000-US-gallon (190,000 L; 42,000 imp gal) water tank for fire protection and air conditioning. The frieze in the lobby featured Art Deco depictions of nudes.

The building was one of the first to be completely air conditioned. As a consequence, operational windows were considered unnecessary and were never added. Its automated assembly lines and mechanical mixers were considered to be state-of-the-art technologies. Cosmetic ingredients were dropped from the third floor to the second floor to be mixed. The company also moved its administrative offices in the building. Desks were established in rows to maximize space, a new idea at the time, but now one of the most common methods of desk arrangement.

A glass block wing was added to each end of the first floor in the 1940s and is the only major addition since the plant opened. The Campana Company was purchased by Dow Chemical of Midland, Michigan in the early sixties which allowed it to function as a separate unit. Because Campana's president, I. Willard Crull, was asked to briefly serve as Dow's interim president, he was afforded time to shop around Campana so that it would be kept intact by its future owner. California headquartered Purex subsequently bought Campana in the mid sixties, made Crull its vice president for health-care products and toiletries. Purex moved all operations out of state after Crull's retirement in the mid 1970s and the factory is now closed. The building was added to the National Register of Historic Places on April 6, 1979. It is now the home of All Dressed Up Costumes and Fizzy Magic Bath Bombs.
