= Lac du Campana =

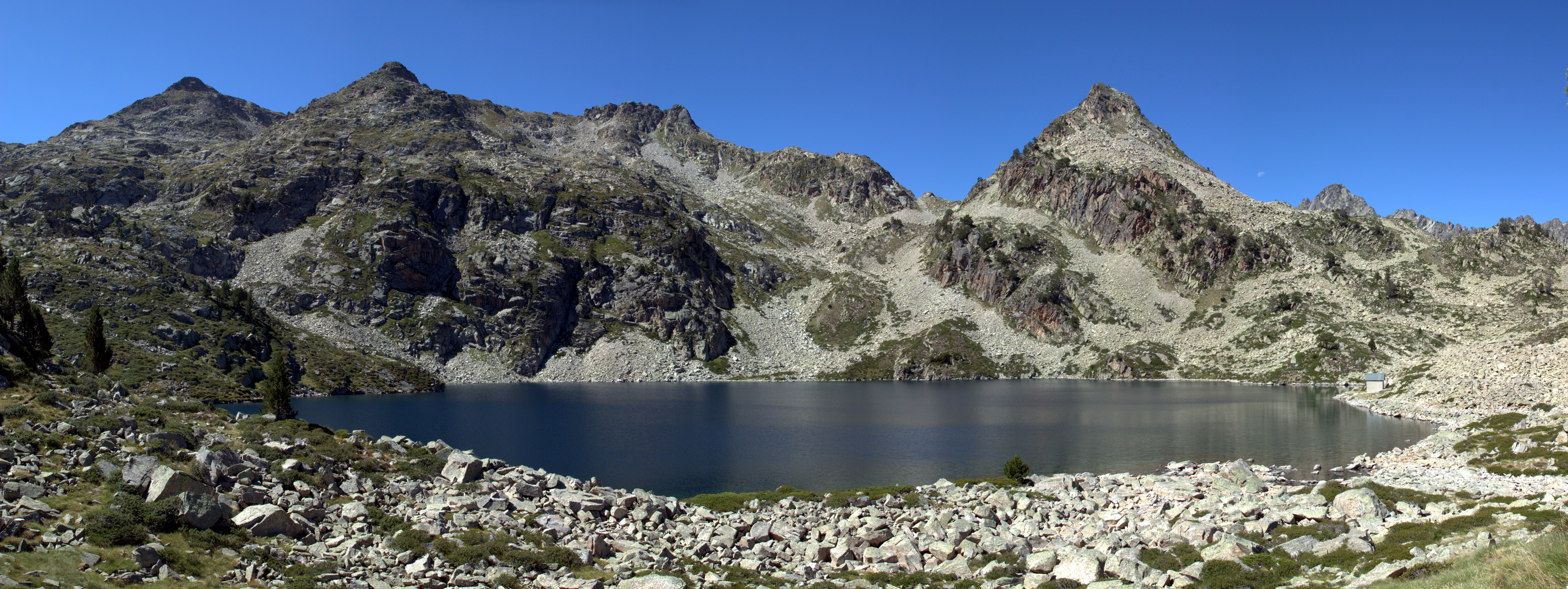

- Location within Pyrenees
- Location: Hautes-Pyrénées
- Coordinates: 42°52′52″N 0°12′10″E
- Type: Natural freshwater lake
- Basin countries: France
- Max. length: 410 m (1,350 ft)
- Max. width: 305 m (1,001 ft)
- Surface area: 0.08 km^{2} (0.031 sq mi)
- Max. depth: 41 m (135 ft)
- Surface elevation: 2,225 m (7,300 ft)

Lac du Campana is a lake in Hautes-Pyrénées, France. At an elevation of 2225 m, its surface area is 0.08 km².
