= Tommaso Palamidessi =

Italian esotericist (1915–1983)

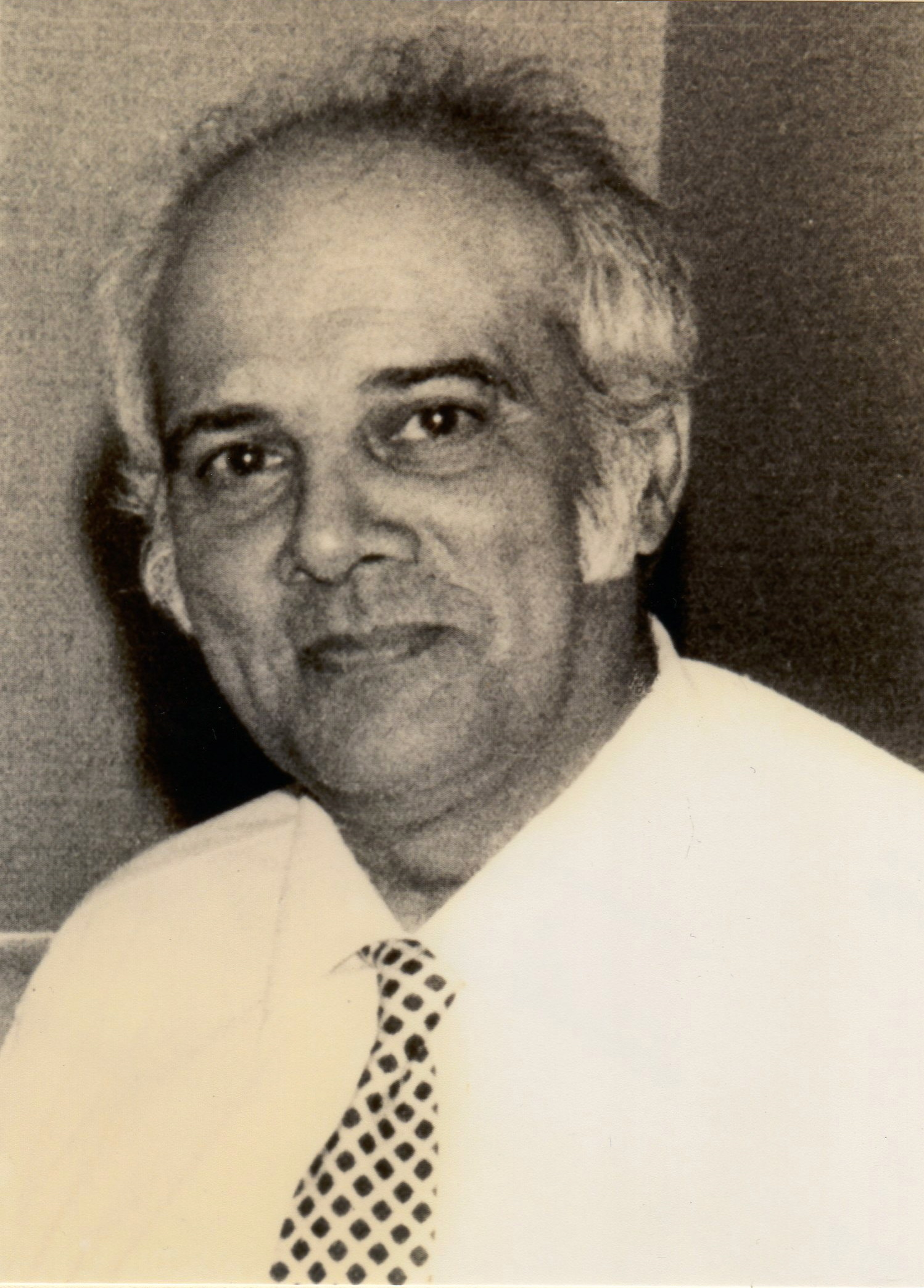
- Born: February 16, 1915; Pisa, Italy
- Died: April 29, 1983 (aged 68); Rome, Italy

Philosophical work
- Era: 20th-century philosophy
- Region: Western philosophy
- School: Christianity
- Main interests: Esoteric Christianity, yoga, astrology
- Notable ideas: Archeosophy, archeosophical society

Tommaso Palamidessi (February 16, 1915 – April 29, 1983) was an Italian philosopher who studied Western esotericism. He worked in astrology, parapsychology, and yoga–tantric doctrines, and developed archeosophy, which he described as a form of esoteric Christianity. In 1968, he founded the Archeosophical Society in Rome, which remains active with several thousand members in Europe.

== Biography ==
=== Youth and studies ===
Palamidessi was born in Pisa on February 16, 1915, to Carlo Palamidessi, an army officer, and Luigia Tagliata, a poet. The Palamidessi family relocated to Sicily in 1920. As a child, Palamidessi studied astronomy, astrology, botany, medicine and religion. As an adolescent he travelled to Tripoli and Tunis to study Islamic Sufism.

In 1933, after moving to Turin Palamidessi began researching astrology, alchemy, Tantric yoga, extrasensory experiences, as well as Egyptology and the study of hieroglyphs. His work on hieroglyphs was carried out in collaboration with Ernesto Scamuzzi, director of the Egyptian Museum of Turin. He also reported experiencing out-of-body experiences, bilocation, and memories of past lives.

His publications about Tantric yoga include The Occult Powers of Man and the Indo-Tibetan Tantric Yoga, Sexual Technique of Tantric Yoga; The Erotic Power of Kundalini Yoga; and Yoga not to Die. During these years, he also wrote a commentary on Egyptian theurgy and the Book of the Dead.

=== The 1940s and astrological works ===

Towards the end of the 1940s, Palamidessi began teaching "Astrology and Yoga". He wrote several astrological works during this period. In the catalogue of the National Library Service, only six astrology treatises written by Italian authors are listed from 1900 to 1939. During this time, Tommaso Palamidessi wrote six astrological treatises: The Course of Stars and Man's Diseases; Medicine and Sidereal Influences; Mundane Astrology (1941); Cosmic Influences and the Precocious Diagnosis of Cancer (1943); Earthquakes, Eruptions and Cosmic influences (1943); and Perpetual Ephemerides (1941).

The first volumes were dedicated to world astrology and medical astrology. At the time, Palamidessi had established connections with exponents of the Hamburg Astrologic School, to whom he dedicated an article in the journal Astral Language. Among his foreign contacts were French authors such as Alexandre Volguine (1903–1976), Henry Joseph Gouchon (1898-1978), and Jacques Reverchon (1909-1985). Reverchon and Gouchon contributed to the journal Cahiers Astrologiques (1938-1983), founded by Volguine. The English writer and Anglican priest Francis Rolt-Wheeler (1876-1960) also collaborated with Palamidessi.

=== 1950s ===
In 1947, Tommaso Palamidessi married Rosa Francesca Bordino (1916–1999), with whom he had a daughter Silvestra (1948–1996). In 1949, a spiritual crisis led him to convert to Catholicism and consequently he decided to suspend his yoga publications.

In 1953, he moved to Rome with his family and contributed to various newspapers, including Tribuna Illustrata, an Italian weekly magazine for which he wrote a section about esotericism and astrology until 1969 when the magazine ceased publication. He visited the monasteries of Kalambaka, Thessaly and Mt. Athos in 1957, and Jerusalem during the Easter of 1966, where he claimed to have had revelations on Mt. Golgotha and Gethsemane.

In Alexandria, Egypt, he visited archaeological sites that he claimed to have seen during his paranormal experiences, through which he believed he had remembered being Origen (185-254), an instructor at the Didaskaleyon founded by Mark the Evangelist in Alexandria. The study of Patristics influenced his understanding of what he considered Esoteric Christianity. During this time, his formulation of a doctrinal synthesis for spiritual development took shape in Archeosofica.

=== Archeosofica ===
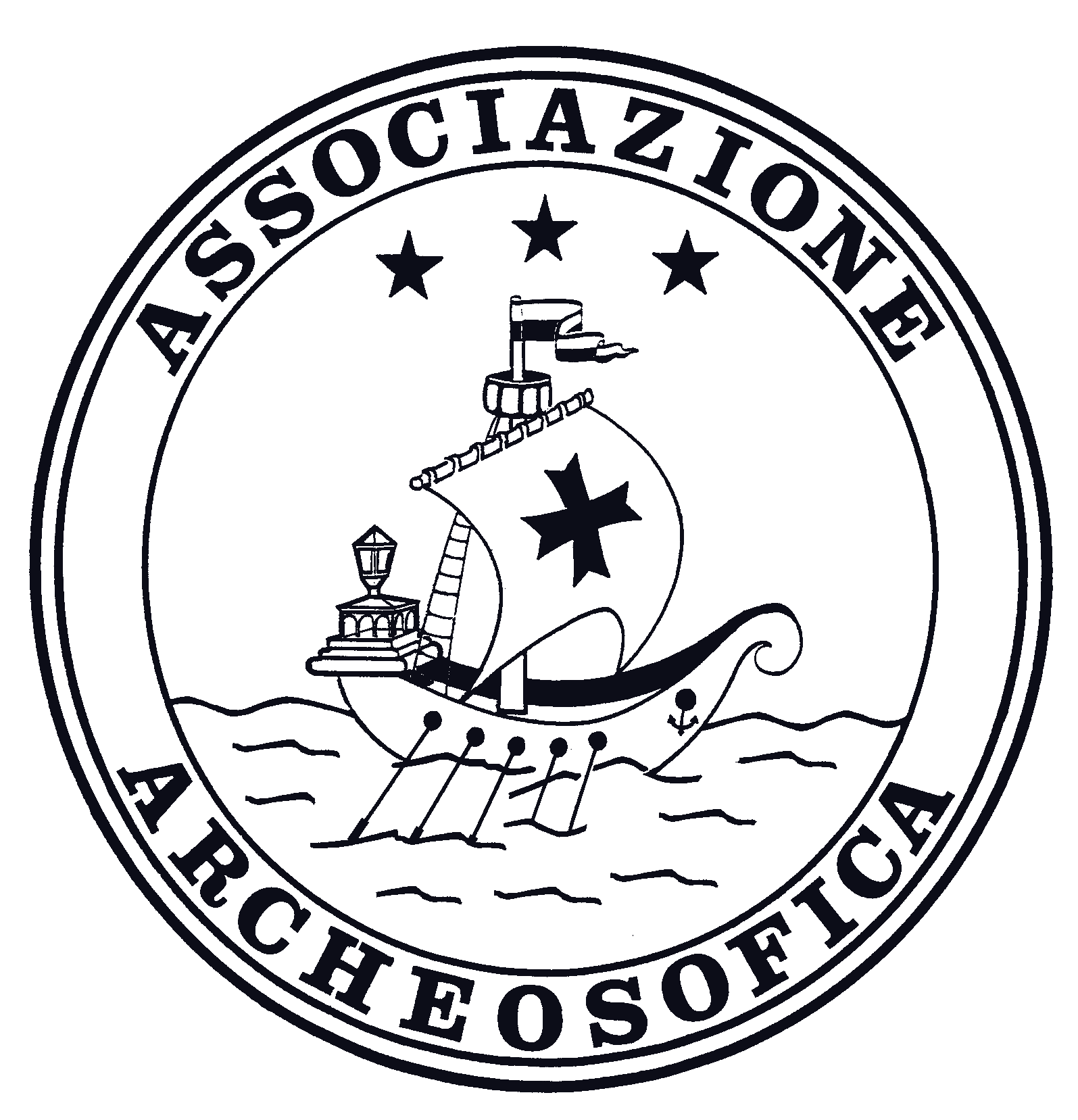
The emblem of the Archeosophical Association

On September 29, 1968, Tommaso Palamidessi founded the Archeosofica, Esoteric School of High Initiation, in Rome. Tommaso Palamidessi described the Archeosofica as

a free school for free scholars, who must not feel like pupils nor apprentices, but brothers who listen to the living voice of other brothers.[...]

It is a call addressed to all, and it does not matter if they belong to the different communities (Theosophists, Anthroposophists, Martinists, Rosicrucians, Catholics, Yoghists, etc.). The Brotherhood is only one, and it can have only one verb: Love one another; only one Master: Jesus the Christ.

In the following years, he journeyed to India, Kashmir, Nepal, China, and South America. From 1968 on, his efforts were focused on the archeosophical doctrine and on the organisation of groups of study and experimentation in Italy. In 1973, he founded a cultural association called the Archeosofica to develop and promote Archeosophy.

== Philosophy ==
=== Definition of Archeosophy ===
Archeosophy is the integral knowledge, it is the archaic wisdom or, in other words, the Science of the Principles. As already said, this word stems from the Greek terms archè (principle) and sophìa (wisdom). Archeosophy facilitates the knowledge of the superior worlds through the development of man of new senses defined as spiritual.

Archeosophy is not only a philosophy that explains the origin and the end of man and of the cosmos of which he is a part, but it is first of all a pure experimental method; it never loses sight of the fact that philosophy has been the surrogate, often unreliable, for the moral and intellectual support of man, who watches impotently at his and others' caducity from birth to death. It holds that philosophy was born when man lost his spiritual contact with the Absolute or Arkè, that is as soon as his dialogue and life of union with God became increasingly obfuscated, fragmentary and doubtful. Philosophy became, in a sense, the instrument for formulating the working hypothesis, the theoretical way to return to the Arkè, full of strident contradictions.

Therefore Archeosophy, before being a philosophy, is continuous experimentation, deep knowledge of ourselves (gnosis), of nature, and of God; it is the reinstatement in the Primordial Tradition, as a true, real, and living contact with the supersensible worlds.

— Tommaso Palamidessi, Archaic Tradition and Foundations of Archeosophical Initiation, 1968

=== The Archeosophical Ascesis ===
According to Palamidessi, archeosophical ascesis seeks a disciplined correction of life through techniques of spiritual awakening and interior transformation rather than through chance or personal whim. The program includes special gymnastics, breathing techniques, and psychodynamic work on hormones and nerve plexuses to ascend through subtle or “energetic” bodies held to permeate the physical body, with the aim of reaching the causal body where the “immortal I” is said to reside. Practices described include out‑of‑body experiences (for direct experience of spiritual worlds), meditation on spiritual centres linked to principles of the immortal ego (e.g., heart meditation termed cardiognosis), and exercises in recalling past lives, presented as part of a path of self‑awareness and approach to God within the framework of Archeosofica.

In Tecniche di Risveglio Iniziatico (Techniques of Initiatic Awakening), Palamidessi outlines an “integral ascesis” in which meditation on centres of force and divine names, an inner life directed toward transcendence, and a cautious use of astral influences to time ascetic practices converge toward what he characterizes as spiritual regeneration in a Christic sense.

== Artistic Ascesis ==
A specific form of ascesis in Archeosophy is expressed through artistic creation. Influenced by the mystical, theological, and artistic traditions of the Eastern Orthodox Church, Tommaso Palamidessi studied and described traditional techniques for preparing and painting sacred icons. His work on this subject, L'Icona, i colori e l'ascesi artistica (The Icon, Colors, and Artistic Ascesis), is presented as a guide for both the creation and contemplation of icons.

According to Palamidessi, by following the principles of chromatic symbolism and the traditional geometry of sacred art, the artist may transform the icon into a "castle of meditation." In this view, the icon is not merely a devotional object but a tool intended to help the practitioner move beyond the formal image and contemplate the divine archetypes it represents. In this context, iconography is framed as both an artistic and a mystical discipline with a transformative effect on the artist’s consciousness.

Palamidessi also emphasized the role of sacred music in archeosophical practice. He regarded it as a medium for spiritual purification and for activating the spiritual centers (chakras) within the individual, contributing to what he described as initiatory and mystical self‑realization.

This integration of art and mysticism reflects the stated aims of Archeosophy to offer a structured path of inner transformation drawing on esoteric, philosophical, and religious traditions.

== Works ==
- Il corso degli astri e le malattie nell'uomo: trattato teorico-pratico di cosmopatogenesi con 22 figure, Milan: F.lli Bocca, 1940 (2nd ed. Archeosofica, 1985).
- La medicina e gli influssi siderali, Milan: F.lli Bocca, 1940.
- Astrologia mondiale: il destino dei popoli rivelato dal corso degli astri, Turin: T. Palamidessi, 1941 (2nd ed. Archeosofica, 1985).
- Gli influssi cosmici e la diagnosi precoce del cancro, Turin: T. Palamidessi, 1943.
- Terremoti, eruzioni e influssi cosmici, Turin: T. Palamidessi, 1943.
- I poteri occulti dell'uomo e lo yoga tantrico indo-tibetano, Turin: Spartaco Giovene, 1945 (2nd ed. Archeosofica, 1988; 3rd ed. Arkeios, ISBN 9788886495233).
- La tecnica sessuale dello yoga tantrico indo-tibetano, Turin: Edizioni Grande Opera, 1948 (2nd ed. Archeosofica, 1988; 3rd ed. Arkeios, ISBN 9788886495226).
- La potenza erotica di kundalini yoga: lo yoga del potere serpentino ed il risveglio dei ventuno chakra, Turin: Grande Opera, 1949.
- Lo yoga per non morire: metodi sperimentali indù per realizzare l'immortalità autocosciente, Turin: Grande Opera, 1949.
- L'alchimia come via allo spirito: l'autorealizzazione magica e la psicologia del profondo, svelate dalla tradizione ermetica, Turin: Grande Opera, 1949 (2nd ed. Arkeios, 2001).
- Gli astri nella diagnosi e cura del cancro, Turin: Grande Opera, 1949.
- Tecniche di risveglio iniziatico: i centri di forza e la metafisica sperimentale, Rome: Edizioni Mediterranee, 1975 (2nd ed. 1983).
- Archeosofia, 5 vols., Rome: Archeosofica, 1985–1988 (2nd ed. Arkeios, 2001, ISBN 9788886495264).
- Il libro cristiano dei morti, Rome: Arkeios, 1985.
- Le basi della teologia sofianica: nuove indagini bibliche, Rome: Arkeios, 1986.
- L'icona, i colori e l'ascesi artistica: dottrina ed esperienze per una Via verso l'autosuperamento ed una coscienza divina nell'arte, Rome: Arkeios, 1986.
- Ricettario erboristico, Rome: Arkeios, 1987.

== See also ==
- Archeosofica
