= Tommaso Caudera =

Italian footballer

Personal information
- Date of birth: 27 June 1907
- Place of birth: Turin, Italy
- Position: Midfielder

Senior career*
Years	Team	Apps	(Gls)
1925–1932	Juventus	8	(1)
1932–1933	Casale	4	(1)
1933–1934	Juventus	0	(0)
1934–1939	Biellese	122	(33)
1939–1940	Asti		
- * Club domestic league appearances and goals

Tommaso Caudera (born 27 June 1907) was an Italian professional football player.
