= Tommaso d'Aquino =

Tommaso d'Aquino may refer to:

- Thomas I of Aquino (c. 1210–1251), count of Acerra
- Thomas Aquinas (1225–1274), Roman Catholic saint
- Tommaso d'Aquino (bishop of Mottola) (1584–1651)
- Tommaso d'Aquino (bishop of Sessa Aurunca) (1635–1705)
- Tommaso d'Aquino (bishop of Vico Equense) (1657–1732)
- Tommaso d'Aquino, a 1975 Italian TV film directed by Leandro Castellani
