= Tommaso Rinuccini =

Italian noble and diplomat

Tommaso Rinuccini (Rome 1 November 1596 - Florence 3 September 1682) was an Italian noble, diplomat and friend of Galileo Galilei.

== Early life and education ==
Tommaso Rinuccini was the son of Florentine patricians Cammillo Rinuccini and Virginia Bandini, and the younger brother of Giovanni Battista Rinuccini, Archbishop of Fermo. He lived with his family in Rome until 1601, when they moved back to Florence. He later went to Bologna to continue his studies with the Accademia degli Ardenti. Problems with his eyesight eventually led him to return to Florence and devote himself to gymnastic and chivalrous exercises. His interest in science and letters remained undimmed however, and he became a pupil of Galileo, with whom he formed an enduring attachment. At the age of 22 he joined the diplomatic service of the Grand Duchy of Tuscany; in 1618 he was in Venice, and in 1622, in Parma. In 1623 he was posted to Rome with Pier Antonio Guadagni, as part of an extraordinary mission following the accession of the Florentine Pope Urban VIII.

== The Assayer and correspondence with Galileo ==
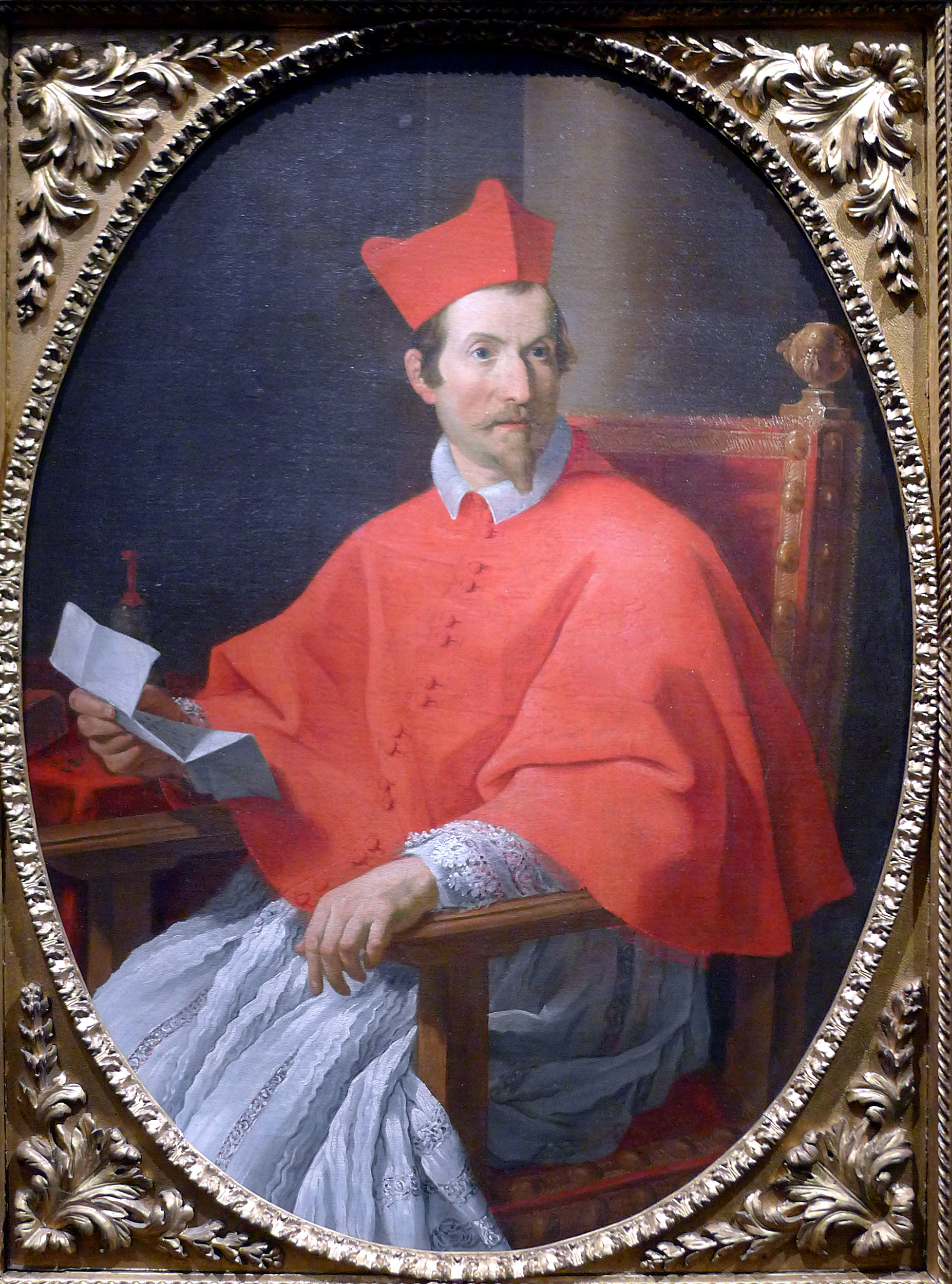
Cardinal Barberini, for whom Rinuccino worked in the 1620s

There were a number of Florentines in Rome who were connected with Urban VIII or his nephew Cardinal Francesco Barberini - Rinuccini's brother Giovanni Battista became lieutenant to Cardinal Barberini. Galileo was in frequent correspondence with a number of them, including Mario Guiducci, Francesco Stelluti and Benedetto Castelli, as well as both Rinuccini brothers. The new Pope was friendly towards Galileo and many of his ideas, and his election seemed an excellent opportunity to take a more assertive line on astronomy than had been possible since the Roman Inquisition had proscribed heliocentrism in 1616. It was important for Galileo to carefully judge the political mood in Rome before publishing anything controversial and Tommaso Rinuccini was an important informant on whom he relied.

The same year as the Pope was elected, Galileo published The Assayer, the final round in his protracted polemical battle with Orazio Grassi over the origin of comets, which Galileo mistakenly believed were an optical illusion. In a letter to Galileo on 20 October 1623, Tommaso Rinuccini wrote on behalf of Cardinal Barberini that Urban VIII had indicated he would appreciate a visit from Galileo. He followed this up with another letter on 2 December 1623 reporting Orazio Grassi's reaction to the publication of The Assayer and his promise to respond to it quickly. He also reported that Urban VIII had read it and was very pleased with it. On 10 August 1624 Rinuccini wrote that Grassi had visited Galileo's friend visit Mario Guiducci while he was sick. It appears that behind a show of friendliness Grassi was gathering information to denounce Galileo to the Roman Inquisition.

== Diplomatic and court career ==
In 1625 Rinuccini was invited by Cardinal Barberini to join him on an ultimately unsuccessful diplomatic mission from the Pope to Paris to try and resolve the Valtellina dispute. After leaving Paris, Rinuccini accompanied Cardinal Barberini first to Spain in the summer of 1626, and then to Florence, where he met Galileo, before returning to Rome. In 1635, back in Florence, Runuccini became gentleman of the bedchamber to Grand Duke Ferdinand II as well as steward and cupbearer to Grand Duchess Vittoria della Rovere. He was admitted to the Order of Saint Stephen in 1642, and became its Grand Constable some twenty years later. In the early 1640s Rinuccini sought a papal dispensation to marry his first cousin, Cassandra Bandini. However the death of Urban VIII brought this plan to nothing, and the marriage was never celebrated. In 1646, by then chamberlain, he accompanied princess Anna de' Medici to Innsbruck, where she was to become the wife of Ferdinand Charles, Archduke of Austria. In 1649 he became gentleman of the bedchamber to Grand Duchess Vittoria, and three years later he also became her chamberlain.

Rinuccini was an established figure in Florentine cultural life. Among his associates were Michelangelo Buonarroti the Younger, Carlo Strozzi and Francesco Segaloni. In January 1616 Galileo proposed him for membership of the Accademia dei Lincei, though he never actually joined. He did however join the Accademia Fiorentina, and from 1620-1622 he was a councillor while Galileo was consul; he was himself consul in 1631. On 17 July 1641 he became a member of the Accademia della Crusca (of which his father had also been a member), serving as censor together with Giovanni Battista Doni. As a writer Rinuccini undertook genealogical research into his own family and supervised the publication of l’Abbozzo di Calendario Istorico Fiorentino Estratto dalla Storia dell’Ammirato e dalla vita del Gran Duca Cosimo del Cini (Sketch for a Historical Calendar of Florence, drawn from the History of Ammirato and from the Life of Grand Duke Cosimo by Cini). He also wrote a pamphlet on the evolution of social customs and court ceremonies in seventeenth century Florence, published as Le Usanze Fiorentine del Secolo XVII (Florentine Customs of the XVIIth Century) (1665).

Rinuccini died in Florence on 3 September 1682 and was buried in the seat of the Confraternity of St Benedetto Bianco.

== See also ==
Palazzo Rinuccini, Florence
