= Tommaso Ruggeri =

Italian mathematical physicist

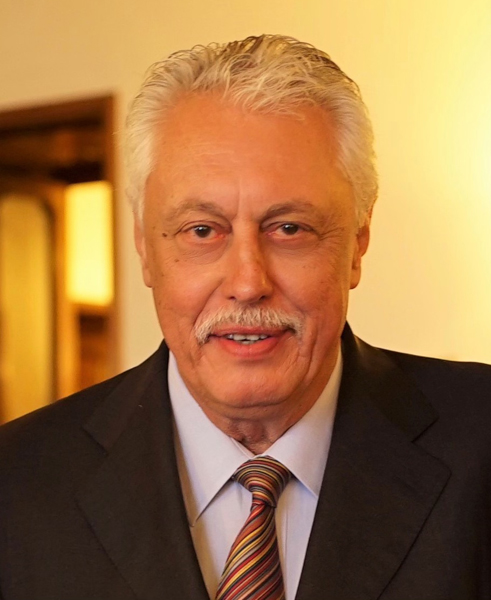
- Born: July 31, 1947 (age 79); Italy
- Education: University of Messina
- Known for: Rational Extended Thermodynamics
- Scientific career
- Fields: Mathematical physics
- Workplaces: University of Bologna

Tommaso Ruggeri (born 31 July 1947) is an Italian mathematical physicist and Emeritus Professor at the University of Bologna. He is known for his contributions to the theory of nonlinear wave propagation, Rational Extended Thermodynamics (RET), and hyperbolic formulations of general relativity.

== Biography ==
He graduated in Theoretical Physics cum laude from the University of Messina on 30 June 1969. He then worked as an assistant in Rational Mechanics (1969–1973), becoming Associate Professor at the University of Bologna in 1973 and Full Professor of Mathematical Physics in 1980. In 2019 he was named Emeritus Professor.

== Scientific activity ==
=== Nonlinear wave propagation ===
He developed a general method for symmetrizing systems of hyperbolic balance laws with convex entropy, contributing significantly to the theory of shock and acceleration waves in classical and relativistic continua.

=== Rational Extended Thermodynamics (RET) ===
Together with Ingo Müller, Ruggeri developed Rational Extended Thermodynamics (RET) and co-authored the book Rational Extended Thermodynamics (Springer, 1993; 2nd ed. 1998). Later, with Masaru Sugiyama, he co-authored Rational Extended Thermodynamics beyond the Monatomic Gas (Springer, 2015) and Classical and Relativistic Rational Extended Thermodynamics of Gases (Springer, 2021). In 2024, Springer published his latest monograph: Introduction to the Thermomechanics of Continua and Hyperbolic Systems.

=== Einstein equations and hyperbolicity ===
In collaboration with Yvonne Choquet-Bruhat, Ruggeri proved that the 3+1 decomposition of Einstein's vacuum field equations (with suitable lapse and zero shift) leads to a strictly hyperbolic system, ensuring the well-posedness of the initial value problem in general relativity.

== Awards and honors ==
He is a member of:

- Accademia Nazionale dei Lincei (since 1999)
- Academia Europaea
- European Academy of Sciences and Arts
- European Academy of Sciences (EurASc)
- Academy of Sciences of Bologna Institute
- Società Nazionale di Scienze, Lettere e Arti in Napoli
- Accademia Peloritana dei Pericolanti (Messina)

He received:

- Bonavera Prize, 1975, from the Academy of Sciences of Turin
- Angiola Gili and Cataldo Agostinelli Prize, 2018
- Taylor Medal in Fluid Dynamics, 2025, from the Society of Engineering Science (SES)

== International activity ==
He was Director of the GNFM–INdAM (National Group for Mathematical Physics) from 2000 to 2017, and President of the Scientific Council of Italian National Institute for Advanced Mathematics from 2011 to 2019. Ruggeri has been plenary or invited speaker at numerous international conferences and has taught at universities worldwide, including Stanford, Brown, Sorbonne, Berlin, Seoul, Taipei, Mumbai, Hong Kong, Sydney, Kyoto, and Beijing.

== Selected works ==
- I. Müller, T. Ruggeri, Rational Extended Thermodynamics, Springer, 1993 (2nd ed. 1998).
- T. Ruggeri, M. Sugiyama, Rational Extended Thermodynamics beyond the Monatomic Gas, Springer, 2015.
- T. Ruggeri, M. Sugiyama, Classical and Relativistic Rational Extended Thermodynamics of Gases, Springer, 2021.
- T. Ruggeri, Introduction to the Thermomechanics of Continua and Hyperbolic Systems, Springer, 2024.
- Y. Choquet-Bruhat, T. Ruggeri, “Hyperbolicity of the 3+1 system of Einstein equations,” in: Communications in Mathematical Physics, 89 (1983), 269–275. https://doi.org/10.1007/BF01211832

== See also ==
- Rational thermodynamics
- Hyperbolic partial differential equations
- Continuum mechanics
