= Övre Svartlå =

- Location within Norrbotten Location within Sweden
- Coordinates: 66°00′48″N 21°10′22″E
- Country: Sweden
- Province: Norrbotten
- County: Norrbotten County
- Municipality: Boden Municipality

Area
  - Total: 0.45 km^{2} (0.17 sq mi)

Population (31 December 2010)
  - Total: 201
  - Density: 449/km^{2} (1,160/sq mi)
- Time zone: UTC+1 (CET)
  - Summer (DST): UTC+2 (CEST)

Övre Svartlå (or simply Svartlå) is a locality situated in Boden Municipality, Norrbotten County, Sweden with 201 inhabitants in 2010.
