= The First Nighter Program =

Radio anthology comedy-drama series (1930 to 1953)

Charles P. Hughes and June Meredith in a publicity photo (taken March 1933) for The First Nighter Program.

The First Nighter Program was a long-running radio anthology comedy-drama series broadcast from November 27, 1930, to September 27, 1953. The host was Mr. First Nighter (Charles P. Hughes, Macdonald Carey, Bret Morrison, Marvin Miller, Don Briggs and Rye Billsbury, later known as Michael Rye).

Charles P. Hughes, the originator and producer of the program, portrayed Mr. First Nighter from 1930 to 1935. An article in a 1939 newspaper observed, "First Nighter was the first show to present complete and separate original plays each week."

The show's opening recreated the aural atmosphere of a Broadway opening. Before each week's drama began, Mr. First Nighter was first heard walking on Broadway, emerging from the noise of people and street traffic into the crowded lobby of "The Little Theater Off Times Square" and then taking his seat in the third row center, where he gave the whispered introduction:

The house lights have dimmed, and the curtain is about to go up on tonight's production.

Romantic comedies were the specialty of the series, and the principal roles were played by the teams of Don Ameche and June Meredith (1930–36), Ameche and Betty Lou Gerson (1935–36), Les Tremayne and Barbara Luddy (1936–43) and Olan Soule and Luddy (1943 and after). Joseph T. Ainley produced and directed the series. The announcers were Larry Keating and Vincent Pelletier. Music was provided by "The Famous First Nighter Orchestra", under the direction of Eric Sagerquist (1930–44), Caesar Petrillo (1945–46) and Frank Worth (1947–53).

The most popular episode may have been the annual Christmas episode, "Little Town of Bethlehem," which was first performed in 1937 and every year afterwards at the request of the listening audience.

Performing before a studio audience, the actors wore formal attire, with Luddy in a gown and Tremayne clad in evening clothes and top hat. Commercial breaks were signalled with the usher's cry "Smoking downstairs and in the outer lobby only, please!", with the action resuming with a buzzer and the usher's curtain call.

The series ran on four radio networks in the following timeline:

- NBC Blue Network: 11/27/30 to 09/29/33
- NBC Red Network: 10/06/33 to 02/12/37
- CBS: 02/19/37 to 12/21/37
- NBC Red Network: 01/07/38 to 08/26/38
- CBS: 09/02/38 to 05/29/42
- Mutual: 10/04/42 to 10/25/44
- CBS: 10/20/45 to 04/13/46 and 10/04/47 to 10/20/49
- NBC (reruns): 04/27/52 to 09/27/53

The show was sponsored by The Campana Company and solely featured commercials for their products. Due largely in part to this exposure, their Italian Balm became the best-selling hand lotion in the United States in the 1930s.

== Listen to ==
- NPR: First Nighter opening in "Radio Legend Les Tremayne Dies" (December 26, 2003)
- OTR Network Library: The First Nighter Program 16 1944-53 episode
- An interview with Barbara Luddy and Olan Soule
