= Tommaso Caracciolo (disambiguation) =

Tommaso Caracciolo (1572–1631), was a Count of Roccarainola and a Field Marshal who commanded parts of the Spanish forces in the Thirty Years' War.

Tommaso Caracciolo may also refer to:

- Tommaso Caracciolo (archbishop of Taranto) (died 1665), Italian Archbishop of Taranto (1636–1637)
- Tommaso Caracciolo (archbishop of Capua), Italian Archbishop of Capua (1502–1540)
- Tommaso Caracciolo (bishop of Gerace) (1640–1689), Italian Bishop of Gerace (1687–1689)
