= Tommaso de Mezzo =

Tommaso de Mezzo^{[a]} (Latin: Thomas Medius) (c.1447 – ?) was a Venetian noble and playwright. He is mostly remembered for his comedy Epirota (the Albanian).

De Mezzo, son of Marino de Tommaso, was born circa 1447 in an influential family, originating in Jesolo and having settled in Venice in 975. Various members of his family had served as ambassadors, generals, and in the Great Council (Gran Consiglio). Tommaso himself is not mentioned in any official document until 1465. He collected codexes, and was friends with known Venetian and other intellectuals of the humanistic period, including Ermolao Barbaro, Giovanni Pico della Mirandola, and Giovan Battista Scita.
De Mezzo became known with his comedy Epirota of 1483, dedicated to his friend Barbaro. It follows the track of the classic humanistic comedies, itself inspired by Plautus' works. He was also the author of at least one other comedy, which has been lost.
Epirota is of special importance for the Albanian language since it contains text in Albanian, one of the earliest examples in written form to have survived.

== Notes and references ==
Notes:

a.	His last name appears as De Mezzo, de Mezo, and Mezzo, in addition to Latin Medius.
