= Leonardo Cazzaniga =

Italian serial killer

- Born: 1956 (age 69–70); Saronno, Lombardy, Italy
- Other name: "Doctor Death"
- Convictions: Murder x9 Aiding and abetting
- Penalty: Life imprisonment

Details
- Victims: 9–15
- Span of crimes: 2010–2014
- Country: Italy
- State: Lombardy
- Date apprehended: 29 November 2016
- Imprisoned at: Unnamed prison in Alessandria, Piedmont

Leonardo Cazzaniga (born 1956), known as Doctor Death (Italian: Dottor Morte), is an Italian serial killer and former anesthesiologist who murdered between nine and fifteen patients at a hospital in Saronno between 2010 and 2014, some with the help of his lover and accomplice, Laura Taroni.

Convicted in nine of the cases he was accused of, Cazzaniga was sentenced to life imprisonment, while Taroni was sentenced to 30 years imprisonment.

== Murders ==
Between 2010 and the summer of 2014, a long series of suspicious deaths of elderly patients occurred at the Saronno Hospital. These deaths were brought to the attention of the authorities at the behest of physician Clelia Leto and vice-primary physician Radu Iliescu, who had recently started noticing strange and even threatening behavior from their senior colleague, Leonardo Cazzaniga.

Following the authorities' intervention, all nurses at the Saronno Hospital were questioned. This eventually led to the arrest of Cazzaniga and his lover Laura Taroni, with the latter being held for the murders of her husband, mother and father-in-law, who died between June and October 2013. All three victims had received doses of drugs that were unsuitable for their conditions.

According to the authorities, Cazzaniga claimed that he wanted to "ease their suffering and make death less painful" by carrying out his so-called "Cazzaniga protocol" – a term he used to administering a cocktail of drugs to his patients, consisting of a mixture of opiates, benzodiazepine and sleeping pills.

== Investigation and arrest ==
Cazzaniga was arrested on 26 November 2016, and charged with a total of 15 murders. The alleged victims all died in the emergency room of the Saronno Hospital, and three of them (Massimo Guerra, Luciano Guerra, and Maria Rita Clerici) were killed with the complicity of Laura Taroni, who, from what emerged from wiretaps, killed her family to continue her extramarital affair with Cazzaniga and expressed willingness to do the same thing to her own children if needed. It was later revealed that she administered a fatal dose of medication to her husband Massimo, causing his death in the process. The death was disguised as the supposed result of diabetes, with Taroni being the designated beneficiary of Massimo's life insurance policy.

In addition to Cazzaniga and Taroni, police also investigated five other employees at the hospital (general manager Paolo Valentini; medical director Roberto Cosentina; medical examiner Maria Luisa Pennuto; ER director Nicola Scoppetta and oncologist Giuseppe di Luca). The five were accused of having prior knowledge of the "Cazzaniga protocol" and intentionally hampering investigations by not reporting the suspicious deaths to the authorities.

== Trial and imprisonment ==
At the first trial, the prosecution held Leonardo Cazzaniga responsible for all the deaths that occurred at the Saronno Hospital. The victims were victims were as follows:

Name	Age	Date of death
Pietro Oliva	84	7 November 2010
Federico Mascazinni	75	14 December 2010
Pier Francesco Ferrazzi	Undisclosed	4 January 2011
Antonietta Balzarotti	88	August 2011
Giacomo Borghi	88	winter of 2011
Giuseppe Pancrazio Vergani	71	18 April 2012
Antonino Isgrò	93	30 April 2012
Luigia Lattuada	77	15 February 2013
Virginia Moneta	91	17 March 2013
Mario Volontè	83	April 2013
Angelo Lauria	69	9 April 2013
Luciano Guerra	78	20 October 2013
Maria Rita Clerici	61	4 January 2014
Domenico Brasca	82	18 August 2014

The first of the two accused to go to the trial would be Laura Taroni, as he opted for an abbreviated trial. On 23 February 2018, she was convicted of killing her husband and mother, but acquitted of killing her father-in-law, resulting in a 30-year sentence. She is currently imprisoned at the Bassone Prison in Como.

On 27 January 2020, the Busto Arsizio Assize Court found Cazzaniga guilty on 12 of the 15 fifteen counts of murder, with him being acquitted in the deaths of Isgrò, Clerici and Brasca. He was then sentenced to life imprisonment and three years of solitary confinement.

The remaining five employees at the hospital received much more lenient sentences, with Valentini, Cosentina, Pennuto and Scoppetta each receiving 2 years and 6 months imprisonment. The only defendant to be acquitted was Giuseppe di Luca, who was initially charged with failure to report suspicious circumstances regarding the hospitalization of Angelo Lauria.

=== Appeals ===
On 13 April 2021, the Milan Court of Appeals ruled on an appeal filed by Cazzaniga and his lawyers - in it, he was further acquitted of killing Moneta, Vergani and Borghi, but had his life sentence upheld for the remaining murders.

On 27 June 2023, the Second Assize Court of Milan retried Cazzaniga for the murder of Domenico Brasca, for which he was found guilty and sentenced to a second life term. His lawyers then filed an appeal to the Supreme Court of Cassation against the conviction, but it was rejected on 23 February 2024.

Currently, Cazzaniga is serving his sentence at a prison in Alessandria and claims to have ceased all contact with Taroni after she accused him of being solely responsible for the deaths of her husband and father-in-law.

== See also ==
- List of serial killers by country
