= Archeosofica =

School of esoteric Christianity

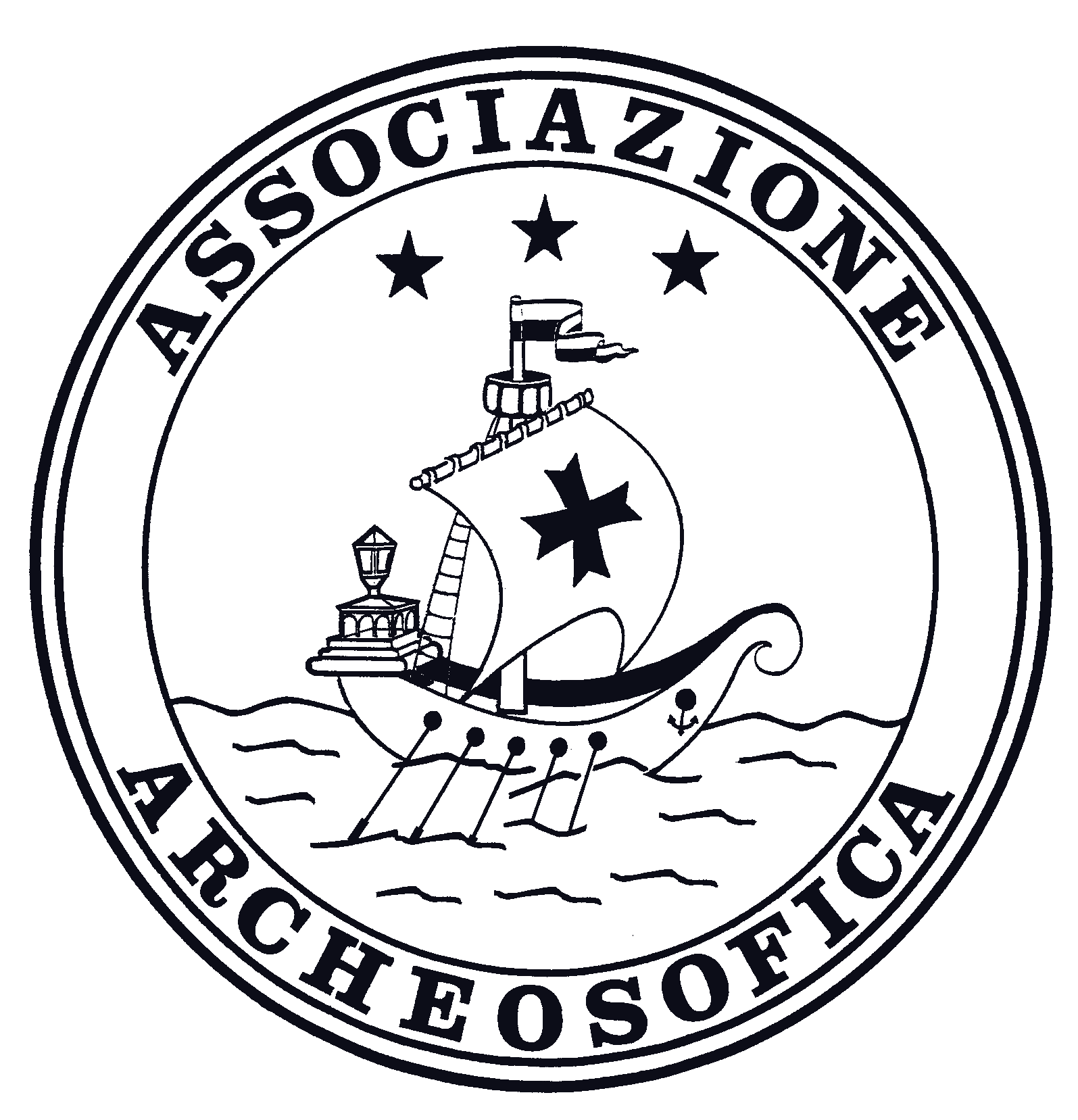
Archeosofica

Archeosofica is a school of esoteric Christianity founded by Tommaso Palamidessi in 1968 in Rome. It offers a program of research on Archeosophy.

The school is free and supplies booklets and other texts.

== Beliefs ==
Archeosofica proposes a form of "ascesis" or asceticism:

1. Physiological and psychosomatic asceticism to maintain physical well-being.
2. Social asceticism, which is the effort and action to become a perfect citizen and to make oneself a spokesman of a "new society".
3. Mystical asceticism through intense devotion.
4. Theurgical asceticism, or ritual asceticism.
5. Magical asceticism.
6. Cosmic asceticism.
7. "Sapiential" and "initiatic" asceticism, or the spiritual elevation of oneself through knowledge and practice.

Subjects of Archeosophy are explained in a series of booklets. There are about 50 Booklets on various subjects such as esoteric Christianity, reincarnation, out of body experiences, meditation, clairvoyance, esotericism, alchemy, religious symbolism, mysticism, and so on.

== Select bibliography ==
- I poteri occulti dell'uomo e lo yoga tantrico indo-tibetano, Turin: Spartaco Giovene, 1945 (2nd ed. Archeosofica 1988, 3rd ed. ArkeiosISBN 9788886495233 ).
- La tecnica sessuale dello yoga tantrico indo-tibetano, Turin: Edizioni Grande Opera, 1948 (2nd ed. Archeosofica 1988, 3rd ed. Arkeios ISBN 9788886495226).
- Archeosofia, 5 volumes, Rome: Archeosofica, 1985-1988 (2nd ed. Arkeios 2001, ISBN 9788886495264).

== See also ==
- Archeosophical Society
- Archeosophy
- Tommaso Palamidessi
