= Tommaso Saccardi =

Italian alpine skier (born 2001)

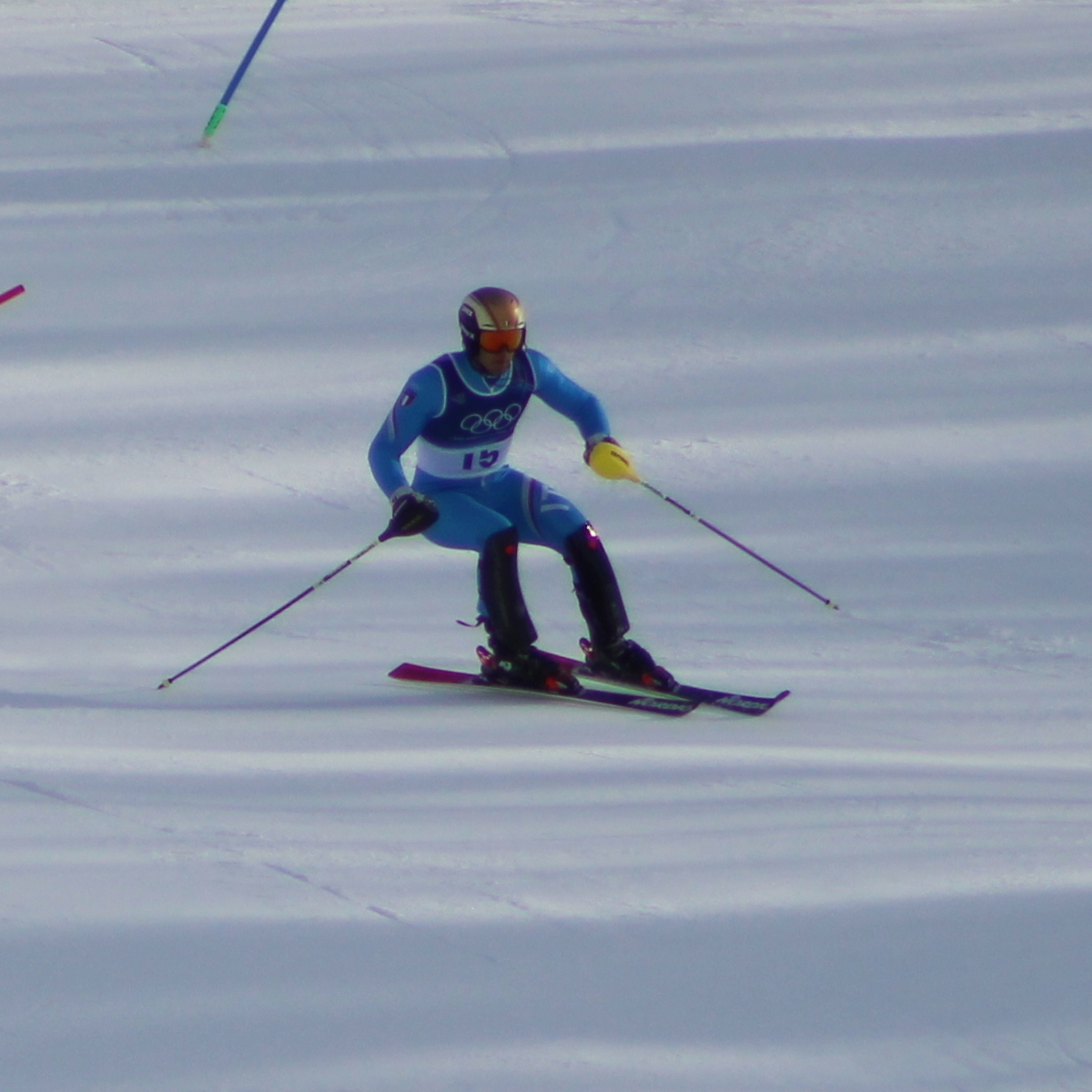
- Saccardi at the 2026 Winter Olympics

Personal information
- Born: 16 July 2001 (age 25)

Skiing career
- Country: Italy
- Sport: Alpine skiing
- Club: C.S. Carabinieri
- Disciplines: Slalom
- World Cup debut: 22 December 2021 (age 20)

Olympics
- Teams: 1 – (2026)
- Medals: 0

World Cup
- Seasons: 4 – (2022–2023, 2025–2026)
- Podiums: 0

Tommaso Saccardi (born 16 July 2001) is an Italian World Cup alpine ski racer who specializes in the slalom discipline. He represented Italy at the 2026 Winter Olympics.

== Career ==
In January 2026, he was selected to represent Italy at the 2026 Winter Olympics. On 9 February at Bormio, he competed in the team combined, along with Mattia Casse, and finished fourteenth. On 16 February, he then competed in the slalom event. During his first run he finished in tenth place.

== World Cup results ==
=== Season standings ===
Season
| Season | Age | Overall | Slalom | Giant slalom | Super-G | Downhill |
| 2026 | 24 | 149 | 57 | — | — | — |

Standings through 8 March 2026

== Olympic results ==
Year
| Year | Age | Slalom | Giant slalom | Super-G | Downhill | Team combined |
| 2026 | 24 | 12 | — | — | — | 14 |
