= Tommaso Campana =

Italian painter

Tommaso Campanella (active 1620–1640) was an Italian painter active during the Baroque, mainly in his native Bologna. He was originally a pupil of the Carracci, but afterwards followed the style of Guido Reni. In the church of San Michele in Bosco at Bologna, he painted Scenes from the life of St. Cecilia.
