= Tommaso Lancisi =

Italian painter (1603 - 1682)

- Born: 1603; Borgo San Sepolcro, Italy
- Died: 1682 (aged 78–79); Borgo San Sepolcro, Italy
- Education: Raffaello Scaminozzi
- Known for: Painting
- Movement: Baroque
- Relatives: Vincenzio Lancisi (brother), Matteo Lancisi (brother)

Tommaso Lancisi (1603–1682) was an Italian Baroque painter, born and active in Borgo San Sepolcro. He was a pupil of Raffaello Scaminozzi. He had two brothers who were also painters: Vincenzio and Matteo.

== Sources ==
- Abecedario pittorico (1753) By Pellegrino Antonio Orlandi, Pietro Guarienti, Page 475.
