= Tommaso Cazzaniga =

Italian professional football player

Personal information
- Date of birth: 17 January 1998 (age 28)
- Place of birth: Giussano, Italy
- Position: Midfielder

Team information
- Current team: GS Arconatese

Youth career
- 2012–2014: Monza
- 2015–2016: → Chievo Verona (loan)

Senior career*
Years	Team	Apps	(Gls)
2014–2017	Monza	5	(0)
2017–2018	Inveruno	34	(2)
2018–2019	Caronnese	18	(0)
2019–	GS Arconatese	3	(0)
- * Club domestic league appearances and goals ‡ National team caps and goals as of 00:28, 8 October 2019 (UTC)

Tommaso Cazzaniga (born 17 January 1998 in Giussano) is an Italian professional football player currently playing for GS Arconatese.

== Honours ==
=== Club ===
Monza

- Serie D: 2016-17
