= The Campana Company =

Former American cosmetics manufacturer

The Campana Factory
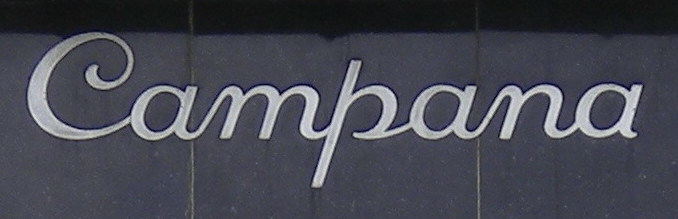

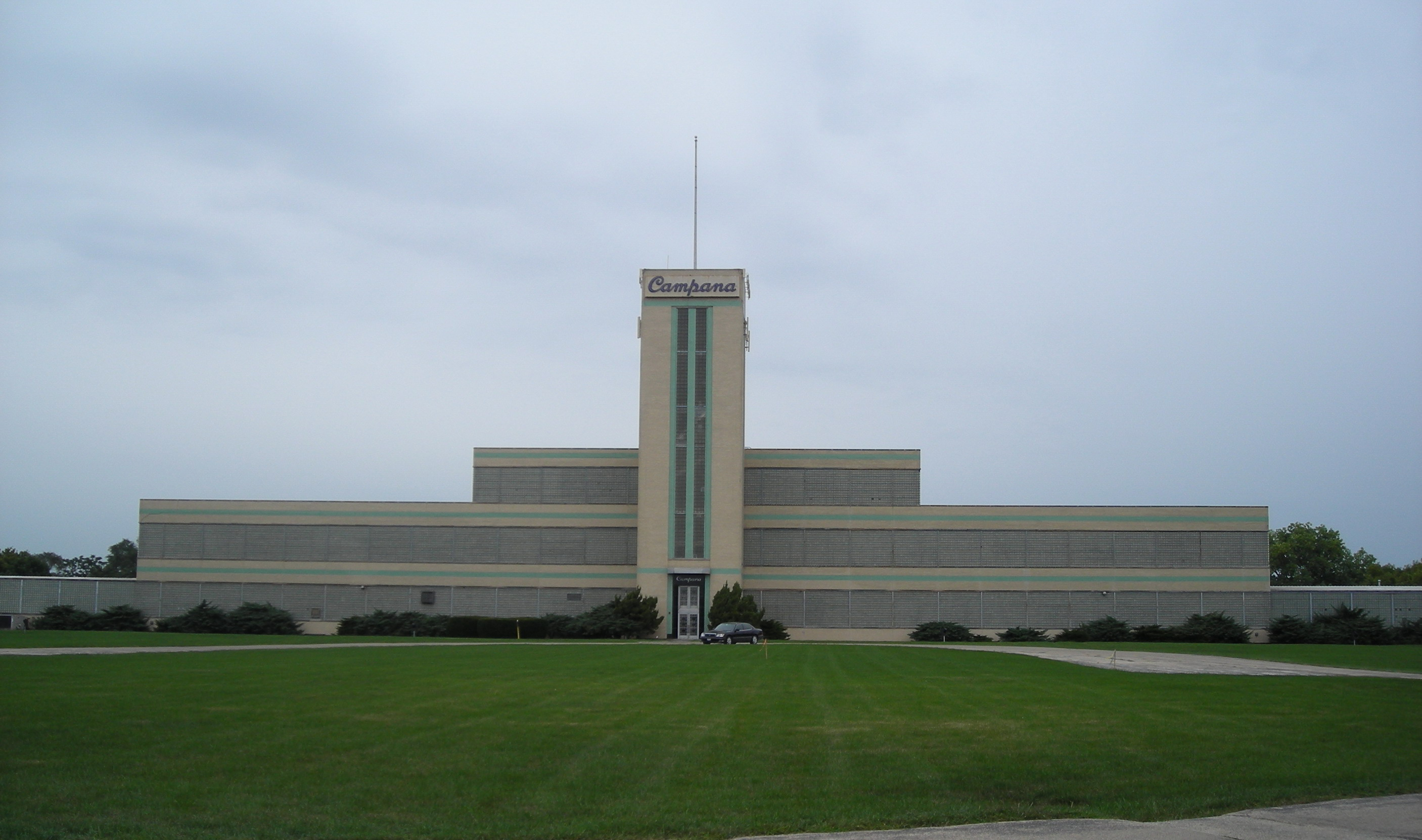
- Campana Factory
- Industry: Cosmetics
- Founded: 1927; 98 years ago
- Defunct: 1982
- Headquarters: Batavia, Illinois, United States
- Products: Lotion
- Parent: Purex

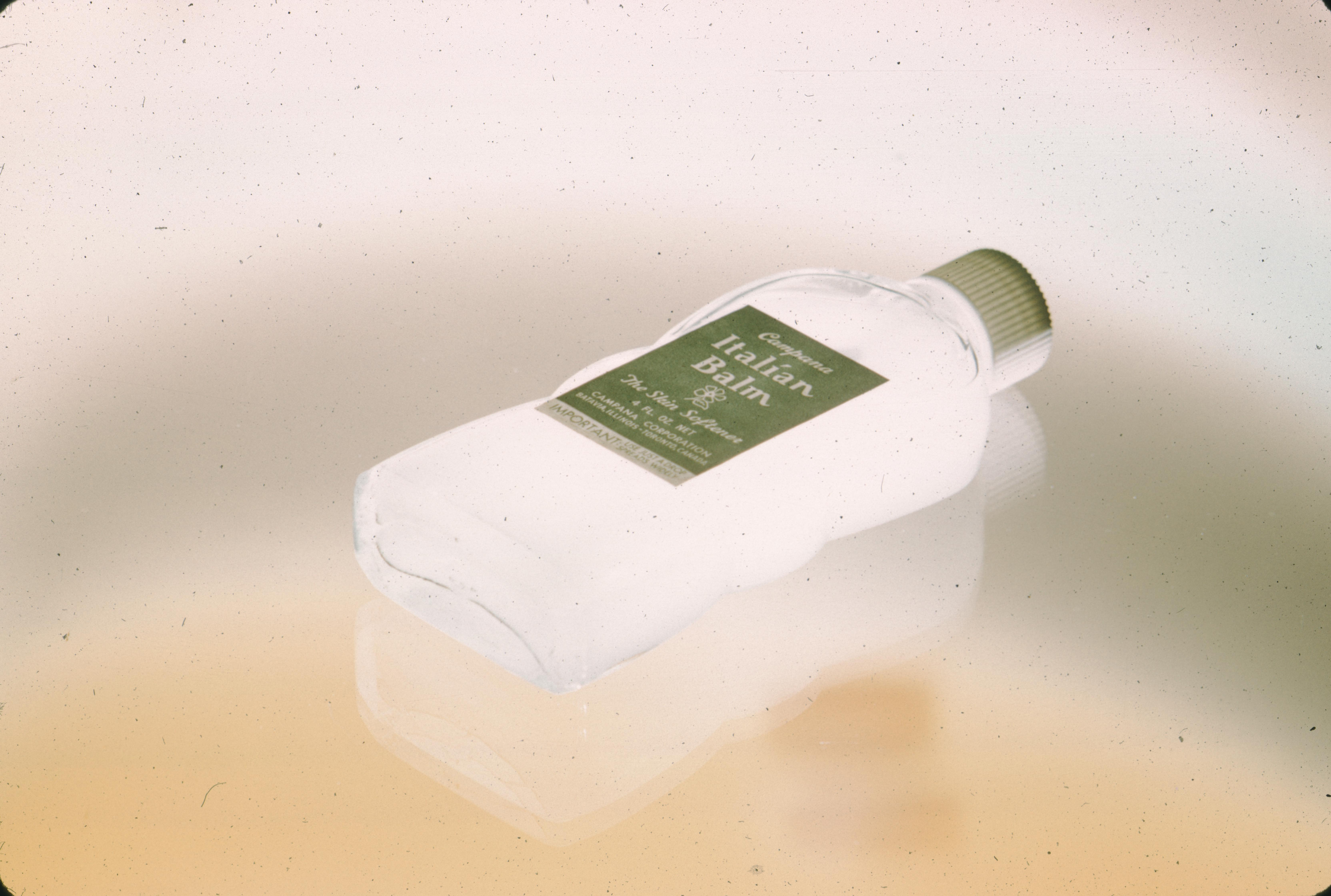
a bottle of 'Italian Balm' made by the Campana Company - photographed in 1962

Campana Corporation of Batavia, Illinois, was a major manufacturer of cosmetics in the 20th century.

== History ==
Campana Corporation was incorporated in Delaware in 1926, then authorized to operate in Illinois in 1927. Its first product was Italian Balm, a hand lotion. According to I. Willard Crull, the founder's nephew and successor as president, Italian Balm was invented by William Cox, who named the product after Dr. Roberto Campana, an Italian skin specialist he held in high regard. Ernest M. Oswalt purchased the business in 1926. In Canada, Italian Balm was manufactured by The Hutchings Medicine Company of Toronto, Ontario.

Although the company first operated only two years before the start of The Great Depression, it was initially very prosperous due to innovative advertising promoted by its owner, Ernest Morgan Oswalt. Campana was one of the first companies to offer free cosmetics samples in magazines, a method that is still extensively used. A second method of advertising was the use of radio commercials. Oswalt hired writer Florence Ward to create a radio variety show that would feature commercials for the company. The show, The First Nighter Program, was very successful and ran for 22 years. The company's treasurer and Oswalt's nephew, I. Willard Crull, would write over a hundred radio plays for the program under the pen name Anthony Wayne. Due in part to these commercials, Italian Balm became one of the best-selling hand lotions in the United States. Spinoffs from First Nighter also included Grand Hotel. Campana sponsored First Nighter also premiered on ABC Television's prime time schedule in 1950. Its Wednesday night time slot was eight p.m., which had it competing against NBC's Four Star Revue and CBS's Arthur Godfrey and His Friends (a program that had already "shot to the top of the TV ratings and stayed there for several years").

By the late 1930s, The Campana Company wanted a new factory to keep up with the high demand for their product. Oswalt wanted a building that would reflect the modern appeal of his products, and commissioned a Streamline Moderne building in Batavia, Illinois. The Campana Factory featured many new technologies, including air conditioning. At this time, an adage was added to the English lexicon, "To work at Campana is like being a member of Frederick Stock's musical ensemble".

The Campana Factory had to change the name of its popular lotion to Campana Balm after World War II due to growing anti-Italian sentiment. By the late 1940s, I. Willard Crull (he had been president since 1942 but spent more time developing perfume lines) took full rein of Campana. He would serve as its president until his retirement in the mid-1970s. He had already expanded the company in the 1940s with Parfums Anjou and would thereafter acquire Old South Toiletries. They would provide stiff competition for French perfumers as Cosmopolitan Magazine highlighted in 1956.

Campana's takeover of Carlay Company brought the "Ayds Reducing Plan vitamins and mineral candy" (commonly known as Ayds) into the Campana product line. A merger with Allied Laboratories of Kansas City in 1958 left Crull in charge. Allied was sold to Dow Chemical in 1960. Although Campana's product line was not compatible with Dow's, Crull was still tapped to serve as an interim president of Dow for a few months, which allowed him time to seek a more compatible suitor for Campana. In 1962 Purex would buy Campana, with Crull serving as the head of its toiletries division, while Campana was able to function as a separate company with Crull at its head. After Crull retired in the 1970s, Purex retained some of Campana's product lines while selling off others. Thereafter, Purex relocated the workers and shut down Campana operations in 1982.
