= Tommaso di Piero =

Italian painter

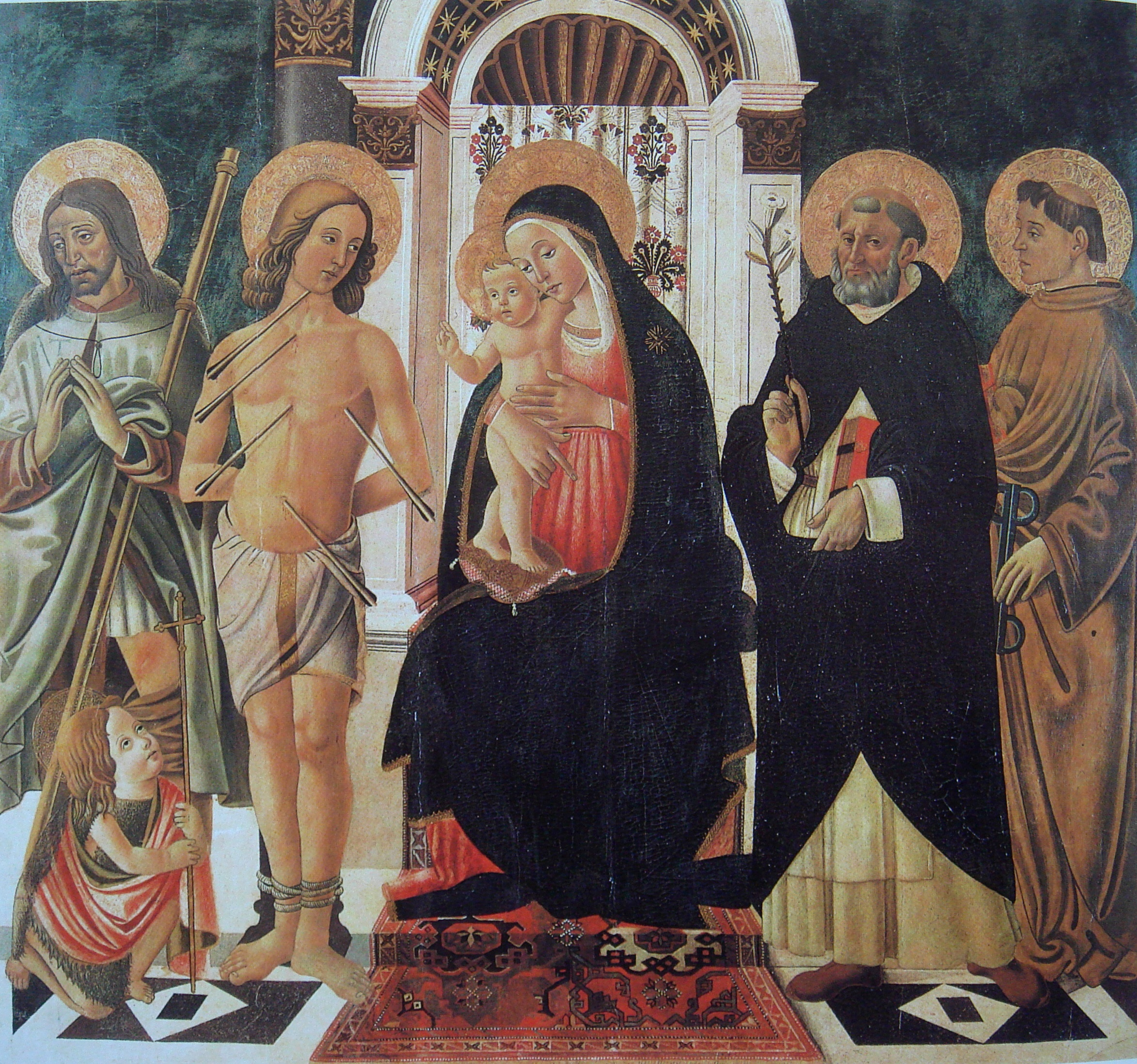
Tommaso di Piero's The Sacred Conversation 1490–1500.

Tommaso di Piero Trombetto (1464–1529) was an Italian painter of the city of Prato. He is considered as a follower of the style of Filippo Lippi.
