= Campana brothers =

Brazilian furniture designers

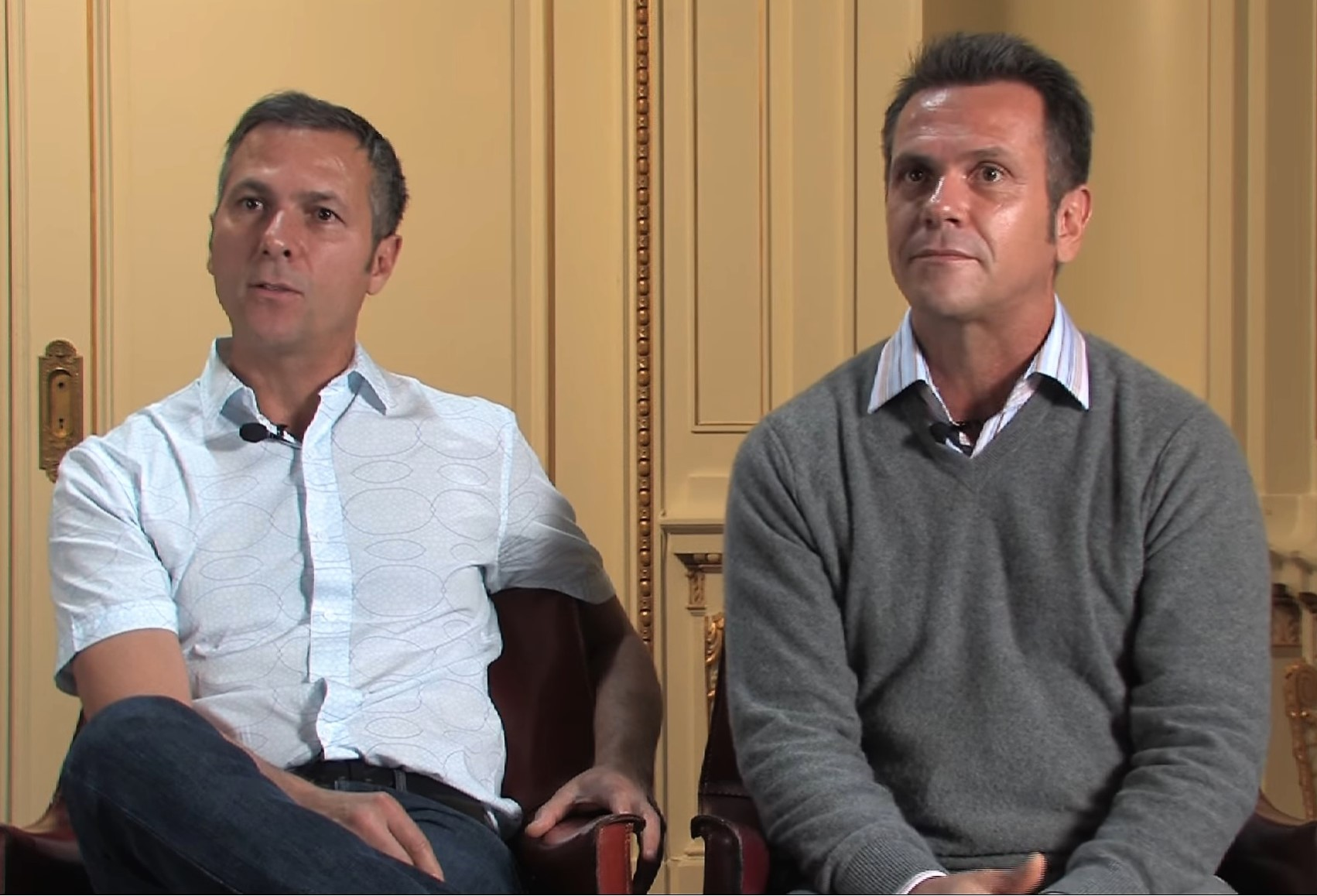
Humberto (left) and Fernando Campana speak to the Cooper Hewitt, Smithsonian Design Museum in 2014

The Campana Brothers, consisting of Humberto Campana (born 1953) and Fernando Campana (1961–2022), are Brazilian furniture designers.

They stated that Lina Bo Bardi and Oscar Niemeyer were some of the big names who had a concrete influence on them.

In 1984 they co-founded Estudio Campana, which became recognised for its furniture design and intriguing pieces – such as the Vermelha (1993) and Favela (1998) chairs and product lines based on innovative new materials, like the OSB-based Celia Line produced from 2002-2004 or the Banquete line that contains chairs created with stuffed animals (around 2007). In 1998, Estudio Campana debuted their first international show with the German lighting designer Ingo Maurer, "Project 66", which was curated by Paola Antonelli at the Museum of Modern Art in New York. In later years, the studio expanded its repertoire to the areas of architecture, landscaping, scenography, fashion, among others.

In fashion, Estudio Campana signed a collection for Brazilian jewelers H. Stern (2001). For the last fifteen years they have collaborated with Melissa to create footwear and accessories.

The Café Campana in the Musée d'Orsay was designed by the Campana Brothers. The Design Museum in Den Bosch, the Netherlands contains a space designed by Estudio Campana (2010) inspired by the Grand Canyon.

Artistic partnerships include the creation of the costumes for “Virtually There” ballet hosted by Performa Visionaries at Mana Contemporary in New Jersey (2006), sets and costumes for the Marseille National Ballet ‘Metamorphose’ show (2007) and the scenography of the ‘Peter and the Wolf’ musical, presented at the Guggenheim Museum in New York (2008).

The Campana brothers have been the recipients of many important awards, including Order of the Arts and Letters, Paris (2013); Ordem do Mérito Cultural, Brazil (2012); Design Miami, Designer of the Year (2008); George Nelson Design Interior Awards, Interios Magazine USA (1999).

Fernando Campana died on 16 November 2022, at the age of 61.

== Solo exhibitions ==
Bildmuseet, Umeå University, Sweden, 2 November 2014 – 2 February 2015.

== Permanent collections ==
- The Art Institute, Chicago, USA
- Association Jacqueline Vodoz e Bruno Danese, Milan, Italy
- Carnegie Museum of Art, Pittsburgh, USA
- Centre Pompidou, Paris, France
- Cooper-Hewitt Museum, New York, USA
- The Corning Museum of Glass, Corning, USA
- Dallas Museum of Art, Dallas, USA
- Denver Art Museum, Denver, USA
- Design Museum, Gent, Belgium
- The Design Museum, London, UK
- Don Edelman Foundation, Switzerland
- Edson Queiroz Foundation, Fortaleza, Brazil
- High Museum of Art, Atlanta, USA
- Houston Museum of Fine Art, Houston, USA
- Indianapolis Museum of Art, Indianapolis, USA
- The Israel Museum, Jerusalem, Israel
- Manchester City Galleries, Manchester, UK
- The Metropolitan Museum of Art, New York, USA
- Minneapolis Institute of Art, Minneapolis, USA
- Musée des Arts Décoratifs, Paris, France
- Musée de Design et D'Arts Appliqués Contemporain, Lausanne, Switzerland
- Musée d’Orsay, Paris France
- Museu do Design e da Moda, Francisco Capelo Collection, Lisbon, Portugal
- Museum of Arts and Crafts, Hamburg, Germany
- Museum of Modern Art, New York, USA
- Museum of Fine Arts, Montreal, Canada
- Museum of Modern Art, São Paulo, Brazil
- Museum of Arts and Design, New York, USA
- Museum of Glass, Shanghai, China
- National Foundation for Contemporary Art (FNAC), Paris, France
- National Gallery of Victoria, Melbourne, Australia
- Palm Springs Art Museum, Palm Springs, USA
- Philadelphia Museum of Modern Art, Philadelphia, USA
- Pinakothek Der Moderne, Munich, Germany
- San Francisco Museum of Modern Art, San Francisco, USA
- Speed Art Museum, Louisville, USA
- Stedelijk Museum, s-Hertogenbosch, Holland
- The Tel Aviv Museum of Art, Tel Aviv, Israel
- Trapholt Museum, Kolding, Denmark
- Vitra Design Museum, Weil am Rhein, Germany

== Bibliography ==
- Tropical Modern: The Designs of Fernando and Humberto Campana, Mel Byars, ed., et al., New York: Acanthus Press, 1998 | ISBN 9780926494183
- Campana Brothers: Complete Works (So Far), Darrin Alfred, Deyan Sudjic, Li Edelkoort, et al., Rizzoli and Albion Gallery, 2010 | ISBN 9780847833269
- Irmãos Campana, Stephan Hamel, Emanuela N. Mino, Max Perlingeiro, Multiarte; Edição: 1st edition, 2018 | ISBN 9788571911048
