= Damüls =

- Municipality
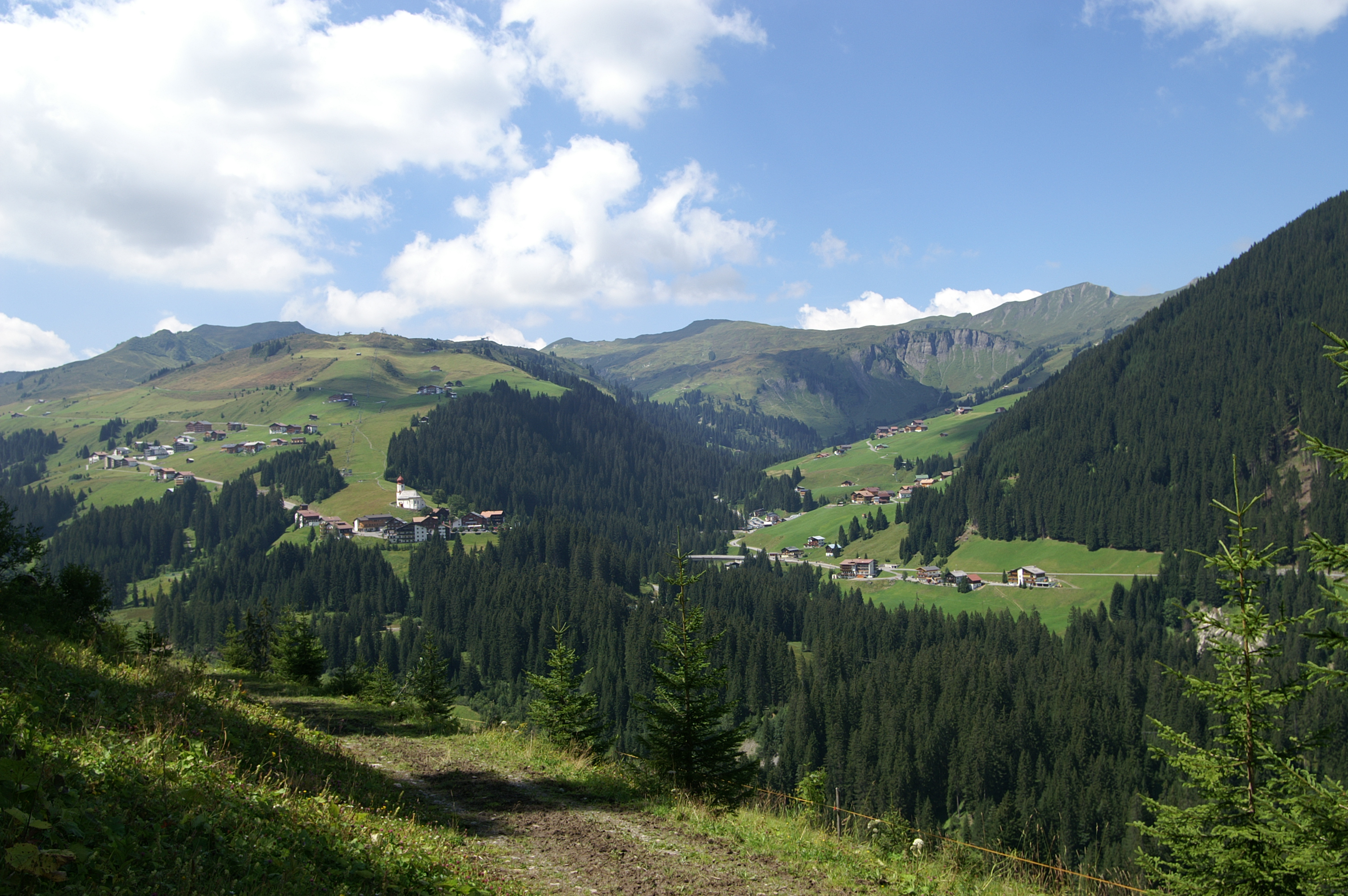

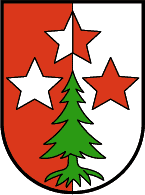
- Coat of arms

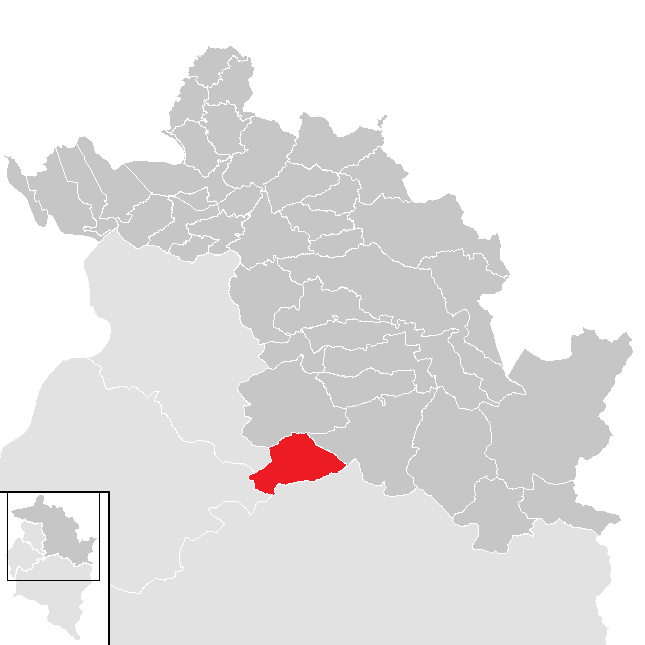
- Location in the district

- Location within Austria
- Coordinates: 47°17′N 09°53′E
- Country: Austria
- State: Vorarlberg
- District: Bregenz

Government
  - Mayor: Stefan Bischof

Area
  - Total: 20.91 km^{2} (8.07 sq mi)
- Elevation: 1.428 m (4.69 ft)

Population (2023-01-01)
  - Total: 351
  - Density: 16.8/km^{2} (43.5/sq mi)
- Time zone: UTC+1 (CET)
  - Summer (DST): UTC+2 (CEST)
- Postal code: 6884
- Website: http://www.damuels.at/

Damüls (Alemannic German: Dimülsch) is a village community and popular tourist resort in the district of Bregenz in the westernmost Austrian state of Vorarlberg.

Damüls is known for its abundance of snow. In 2006, Damüls was awarded the honorary title "the snowiest village in the world".

== Population ==
Historical population
| Year | Pop. | ±% |
|---|---|---|
| 1869 | 383 | — |
| 1880 | 365 | −4.7% |
| 1890 | 278 | −23.8% |
| 1900 | 241 | −13.3% |
| 1910 | 225 | −6.6% |
| 1923 | 204 | −9.3% |
| 1934 | 218 | +6.9% |
| 1939 | 209 | −4.1% |
| 1951 | 223 | +6.7% |
| 1961 | 241 | +8.1% |
| 1971 | 322 | +33.6% |
| 1981 | 304 | −5.6% |
| 1991 | 309 | +1.6% |
| 2001 | 326 | +5.5% |
| 2011 | 316 | −3.1% |

== Geography ==
Damüls is situated at an altitude of 1,430 m. It has an area of 20.92 km². It borders on the Bregenz Forest, the Biosphere Reserve Großes Walsertal, the Laternsertal, and all other Vorarlberg districts (Bludenz, Feldkirch and Dornbirn). The most famous mountain peak in the area, a popular hiking destination from Damüls, is the Damülser Mittagsspitze (2,095 m).

== History ==
In the late Middle Ages c. 1300, the Walser ethnic folk group fled from the Swiss Kanton Wallis to this area seeking a better way of life and agricultural land. They were allowed to settle in Vorarlberg (then largely under the Swabian Counts of Montfort), in the west of Tyrol and in Graubünden. From 1313 onwards, Damüls was populated by Walsers. At the time, the Supreme Court (Damüls and Fontanella) was independent. The inhabitants of Damüls, in return, joined the Montfort House to serve with "spear and shield" in the event of war.

== Culture ==
The Vorarlberger FIS Skimuseum Damüls offers exhibitions on the long history of skiing in Vorarlberg. In addition to historic and rare Alpine skis, ski jump-related objects are also on display. The entry is free.

The Church of St. Nikolaus occupies a prominent place in the mountain village of Damüls. The art-historically valuable church with its preserved frescoes depicting a Bible for the poor dates from the time of the arrival of the Walsers in the 13th/14th centuries.

=== Customs ===
In the region, many old traditions are still alive and well, including the typical dialect that is still spoken here. Wearing traditional folk costumes ("tracht") on festive occasions also contributes to an authentic yesteryear atmosphere. Alpine Transhumance, or mobile mountain meadow culture, is still practiced in Damüls. This means that farmers bring their cattle to wherever food is available in the mountains. Depending on the season, cattle will change stables several times a year. Alpine transhumance is also called "Dreistufenwirtschaft" (literally "three stage economy") in German because the mountain pastures are managed in three stages: lower, middle, and upper mountain altitudes. This transhumance is one of the prime factors preserving the natural and cultural landscape of the region, along with the strong tradition of cheese production in Vorarlberg. In 2011, the UNESCO declared the "Dreistufenwirtschaft" in the Bregenz Forest to be an intangible cultural heritage.

== Tourism ==
Thanks to the merging of the two ski areas of Damüls and Mellau in 2010, the largest ski area in the Bregenz Forest, and one of the largest ski regions in the state of Vorarlberg, was created: the ski area Damüls-Mellau. There is a 2.5 km long natural toboggan run which is illuminated two days a week.

This resort region is known for its abundance of snow. In 2006, Damüls was awarded the title "Snowiest village in the world". On average, there is 9.30 meters of fresh snow per season.

Numerous hiking trails lead from Damüls over alpine meadows and to summits with views over the surrounding mountain tops. The temperatures are pleasant even during hot periods in midsummer.

== See also ==
- Snowfall Records

== Photo gallery ==
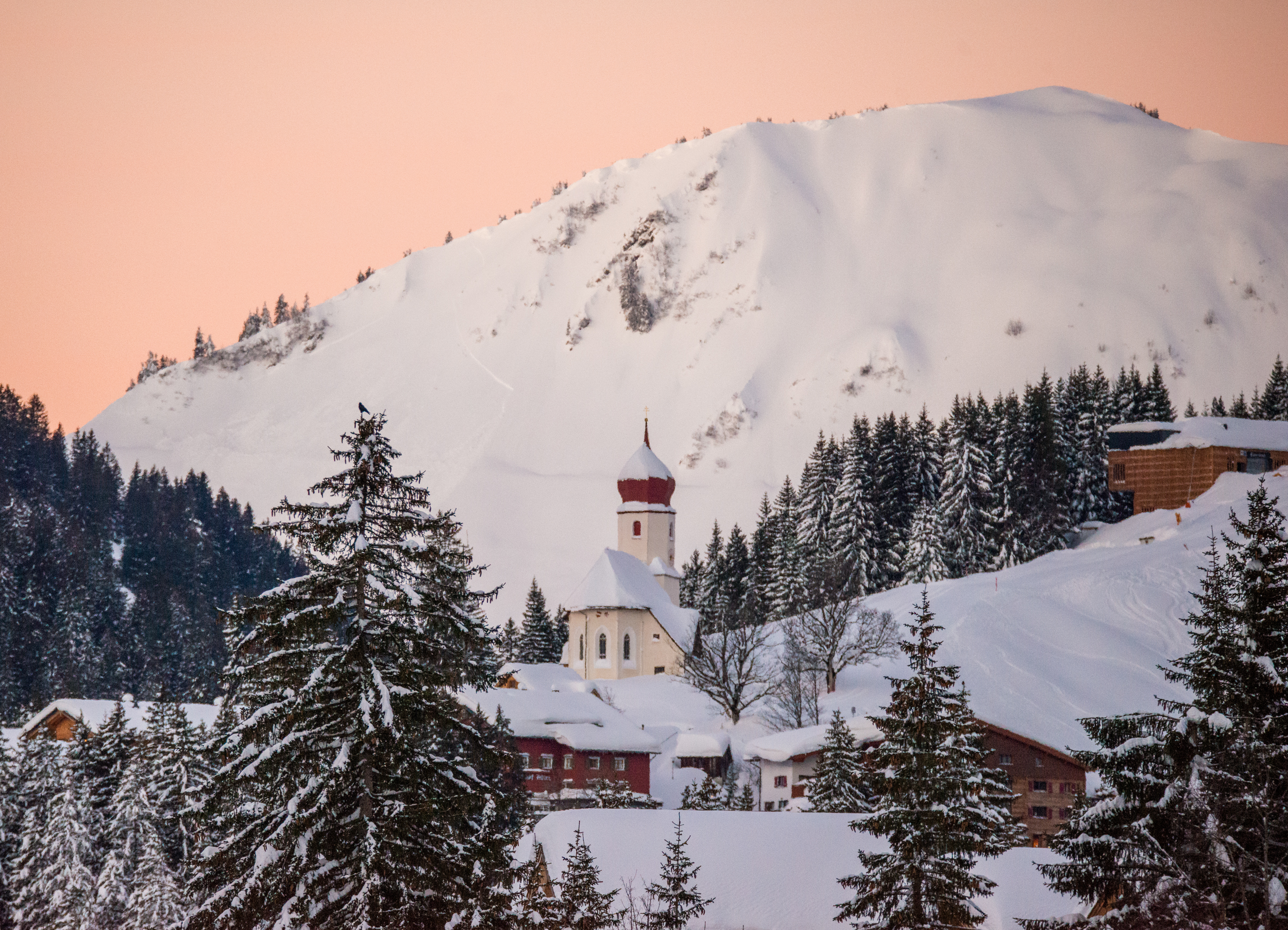
Church St. Nikolaus in the winter

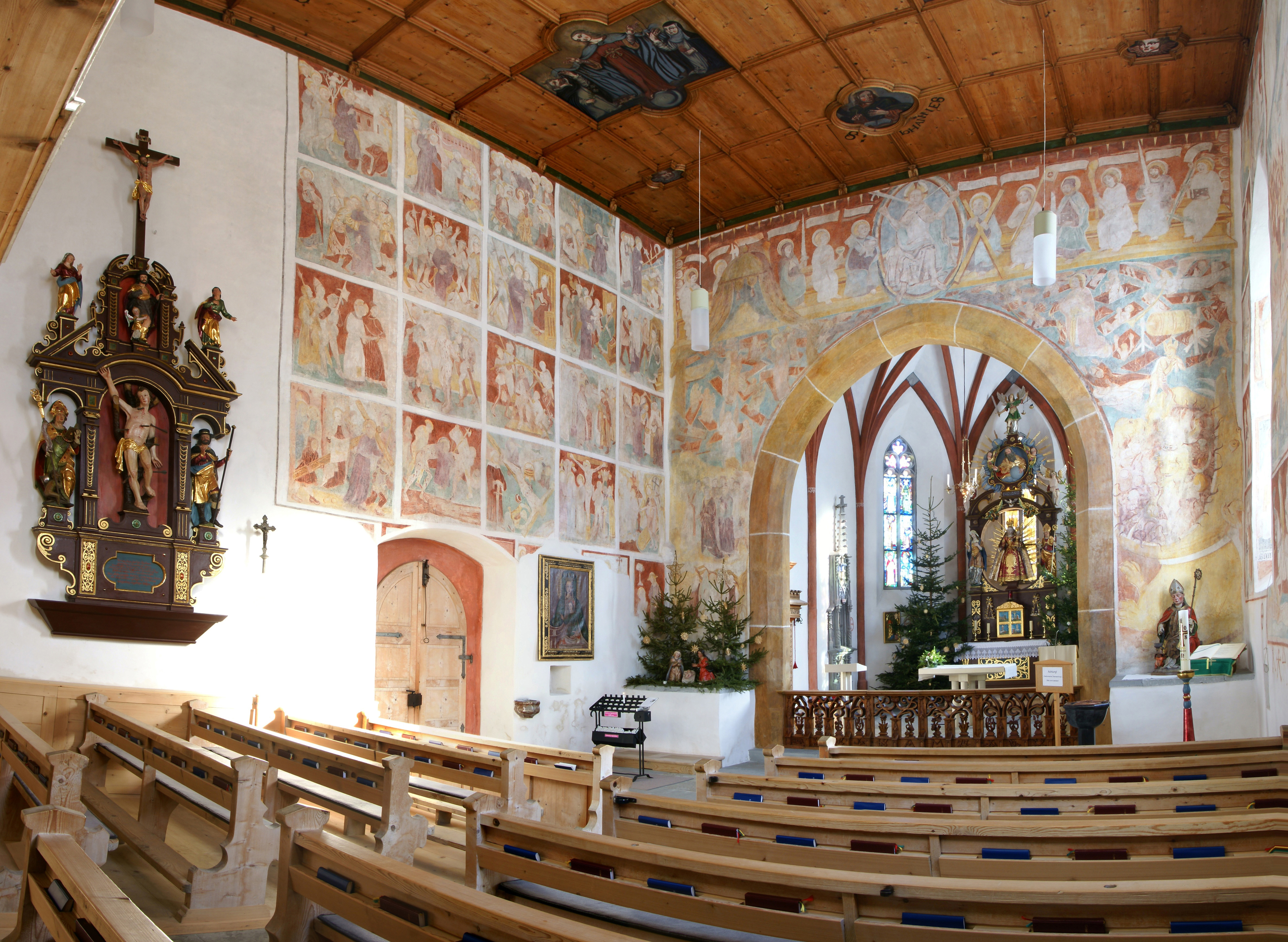
Frescoes in the Church St. Nikolaus

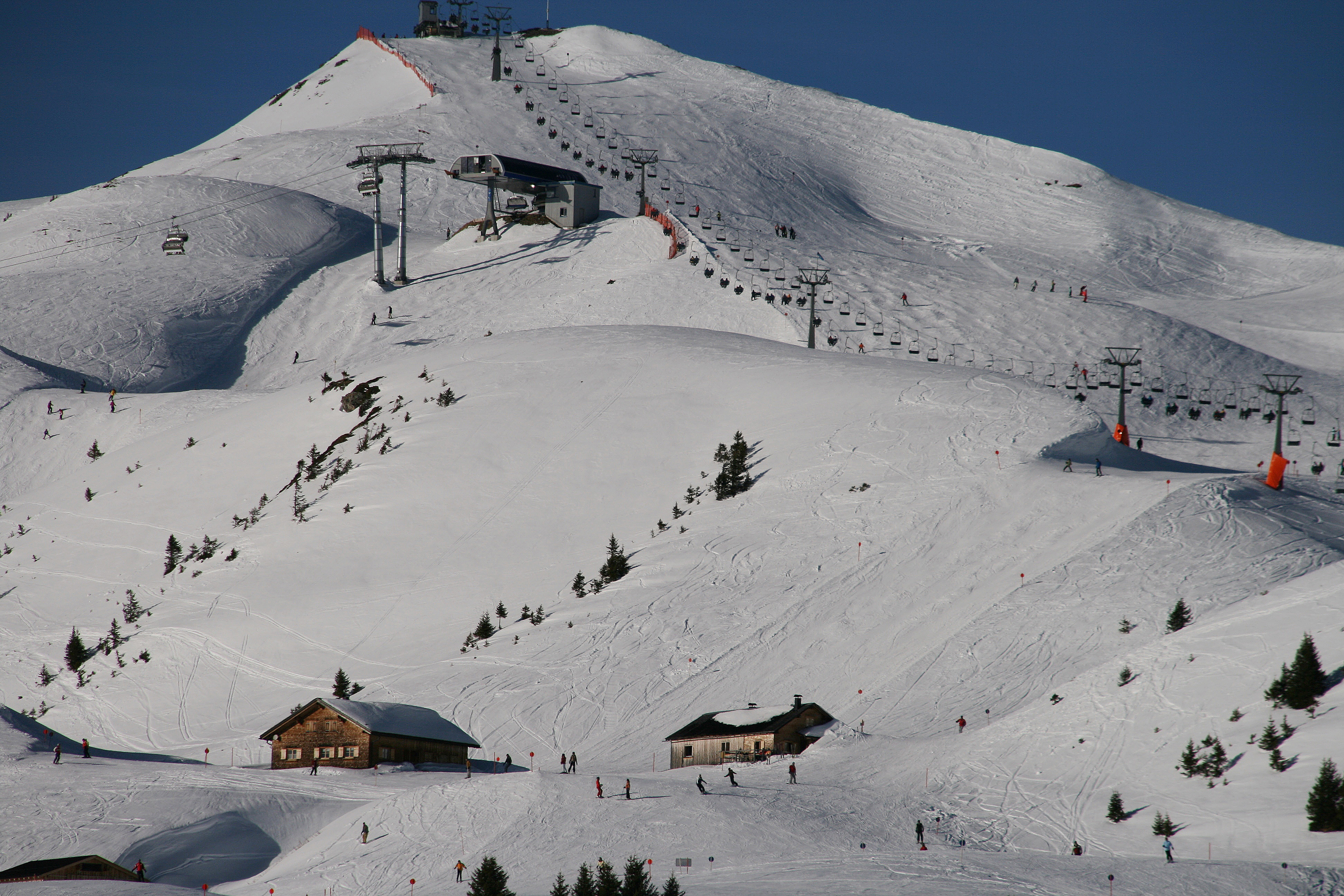
The ski area Damüls-Mellau

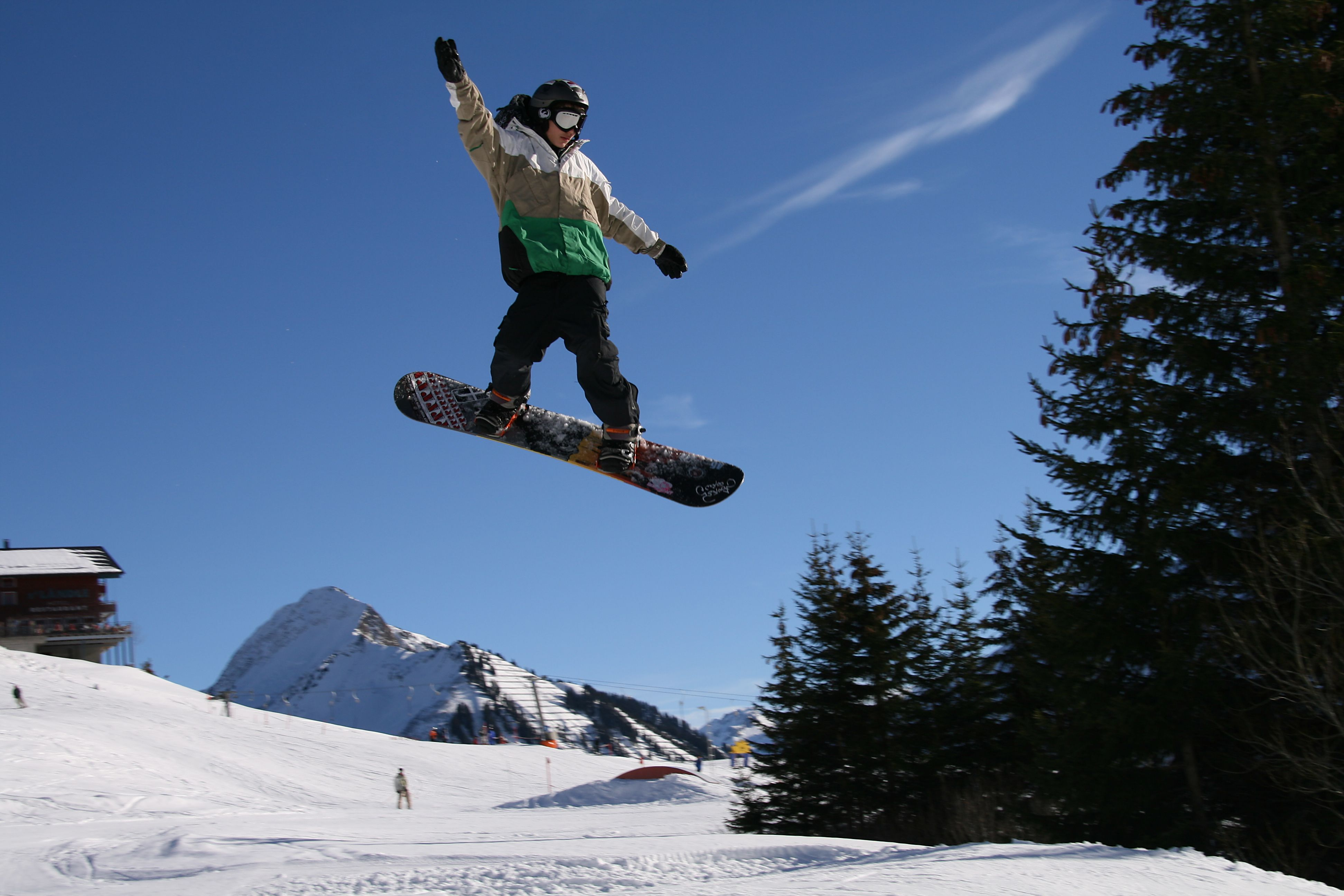
A snowboarder in the ski area Damüls-Mellau

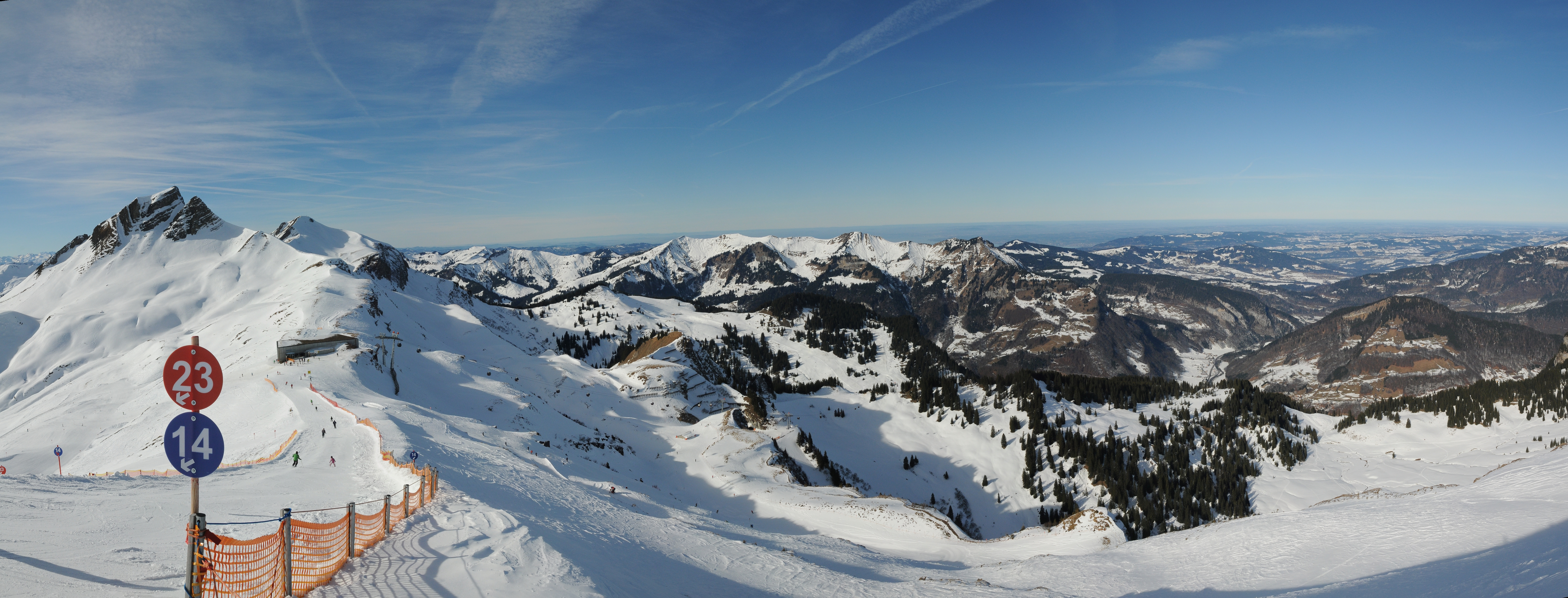
View of the Damülser Mittagsspitze and the ski area of Damüls-Mellau

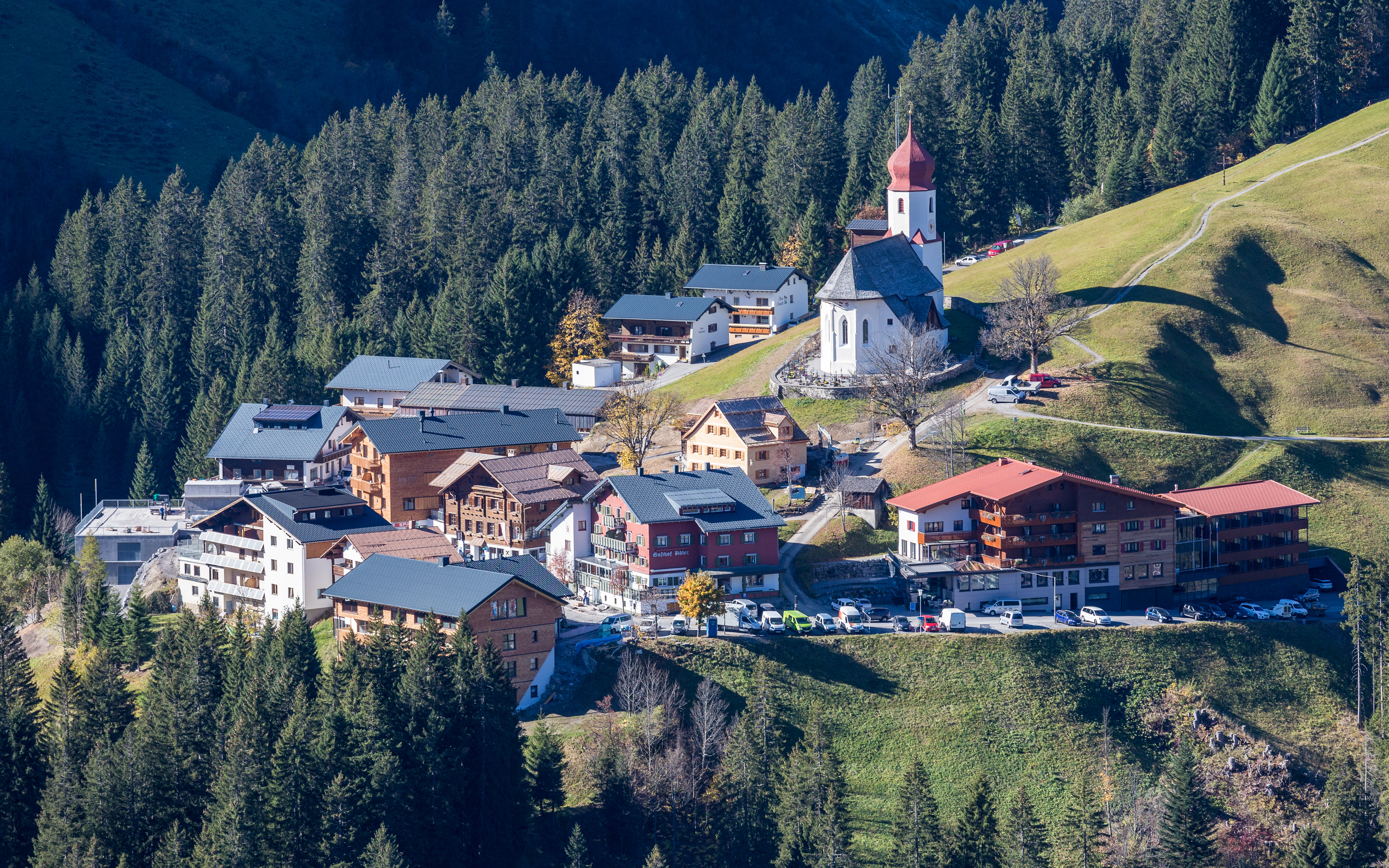
The centrum of Damüls

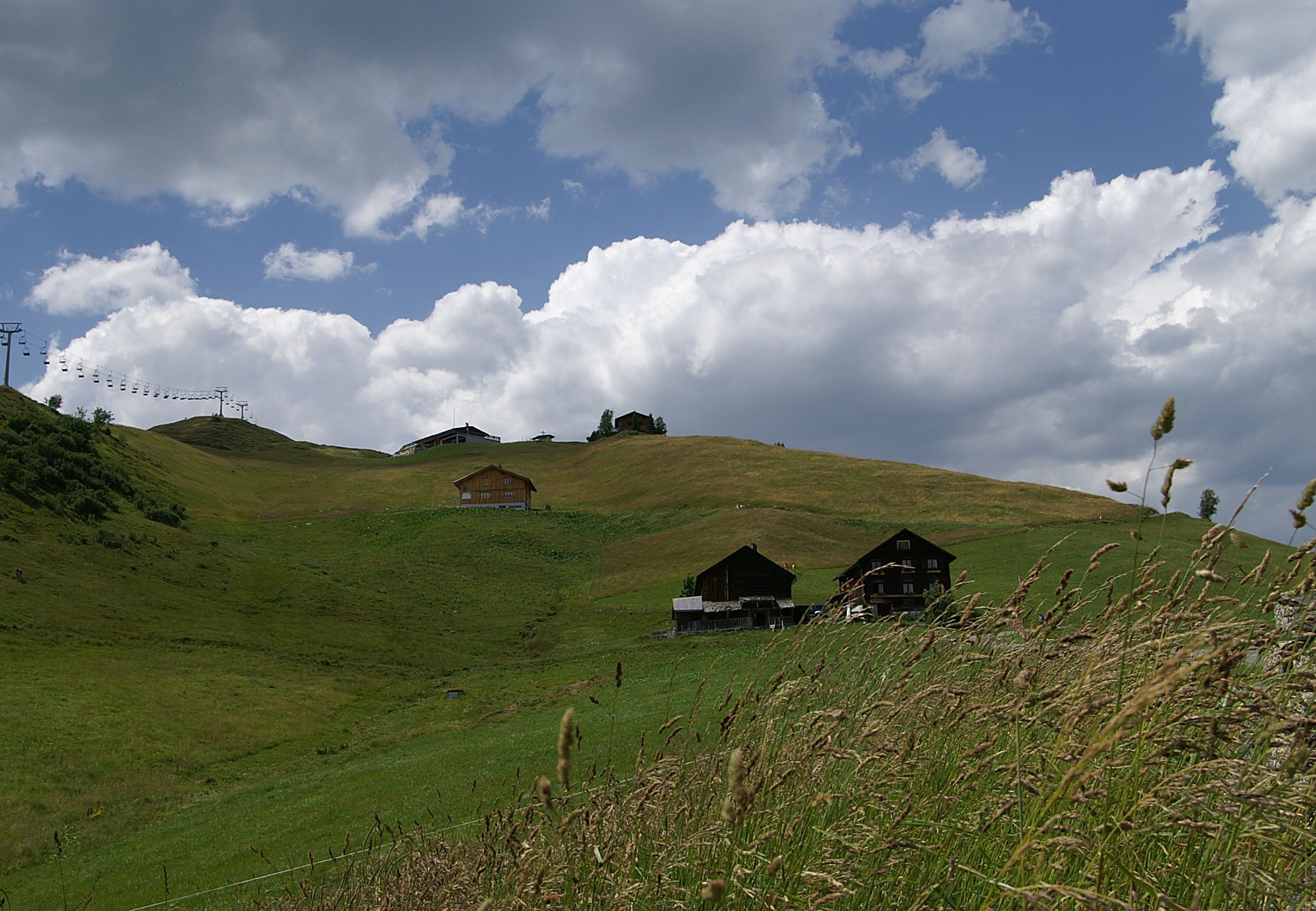
Damüls in the summer time
