= Alpine skiing at the 2019 European Youth Olympic Winter Festival =

- Venue: Jahorina ski resort Bjelašnica
- Date: 11–15 February
- Website: eyof2019.net

Locations in Bosnia and Herzegovina

Alpine skiing at the 2019 European Youth Olympic Winter Festival was held from 11 to 15 February at Jahorina ski resort (slalom and giant slalom) and Bjelašnica (mixed team), Bosnia and Herzegovina.

== Competition schedule ==
Date	Time	Event
11 February	10:00; 13:15	Girls' slalom
12 February	09:30; 13:15	Boys' slalom
13 February	10:00; 12:30	Girls' giant slalom
14 February	10:00; 12:30	Boys' giant slalom
15 February	09:00	Mixed team
Source: All times are (UTC+1)

=== Course information ===
Date	Race	Start elevation	Finish elevation	Vertical drop
11 February	Slalom – girls	1,655 m (5,430 ft)	1,485 m (4,872 ft)	170 m (560 ft)
12 February	Slalom – boys	1,655 m (5,430 ft)	1,480 m (4,860 ft)	175 m (574 ft)
13 February	Giant slalom – girls	1,655 m (5,430 ft)	1,326 m (4,350 ft)	329 m (1,079 ft)
14 February	Giant slalom – boys	1,655 m (5,430 ft)	1,326 m (4,350 ft)	329 m (1,079 ft)
15 February	Team event	0 m (0 ft)	0 m (0 ft)	0 m (0 ft)

== Medal summary ==
=== Medal table ===
Rank	Nation	Gold	Silver	Bronze	Total
1	Austria	3	1	1	5
2	France	1	1	3	5
3	Norway	1	0	2	3
4	Italy	0	1	1	2
5	Russia	0	1	0	1
5	Slovenia	0	1	0	1
Totals (6 entries)		5	5	7	17

=== Boys' events ===
Event	Gold		Silver		Bronze	
Giant slalom	Andreas Sønsterud Amdahl; Norway	2:09.95	Nikita Kazazaev; Russia	2:10.02	Pablo Banfi; France Matteo Bendotti; Italy	2:10.23
Slalom	Joshua Sturm; Austria	1:52.05	Manuel Ploner; Italy	1:53.39	Lukas Feurstein; Austria Oscar Zimmer; Norway	1:53.42

=== Girls' events ===
Event	Gold		Silver		Bronze	
Giant slalom	Magdalena Egger; Austria	2:16.38	Rebeka Oblak; Slovenia	2:19.00	Axelle Chevrier; France	2:19.02
Slalom	Magdalena Egger; Austria	1:40.70	Marie Lamure; France	1:41.10	Marion Chevrier; France	1:43.43

=== Team event ===
Event	Gold	Silver	Bronze
Mixed team	France; Marie Lamure; Pablo Banfi; Léo Ducros; Caitlin McFarlane	Austria; Magdalena Egger; Joshua Sturm; Lukas Feurstein; Amanda Salzgeber	Norway; Sofie Aam Olsen; Oscar Zimmer; Andreas Sønsterud Amdahl; Anna Bryn Mørkeset
