= Noel Zwischenbrugger =

Austrian alpine ski racer

Personal information
- Born: 24 March 2001 (age 25)

Skiing career
- Sport: Alpine skiing
- Club: SV Mellau - Vorarlberg
- Disciplines: Giant slalom
- World Cup debut: 9 December 2023
- Updated on 27 February 2024

Noel Zwischenbrugger (born 24 March 2001) is an Austrian World Cup alpine ski racer who specializes in giant slalom.

Zwischenbrugger was raised in the village of Mellau. He debuted as a junior on 1 December 2017. He was removed from the Austrian national skiing team due to a lack of results in 2020, but continued to train on his own. He gave his debut at the FIS Alpine Ski Europa Cup in December 2021, but shortly afterwards suffered a tear of the syndesmotic ligament.

On 9 December 2023, Zwischenbrugger gave his World Cup Debut at Val-d'Isère, where he immediately scored points, finishing 13th with the best time in the second run. His debut only came about because the originally qualified Joshua Sturm had to withdraw due to illness.

Zwischenbrugger's uncle Jan Zwischenbrugger is a soccer player.
