= 2024 Alpine Skiing World Cup – Men's overall =

Alpine ski discipline year standings

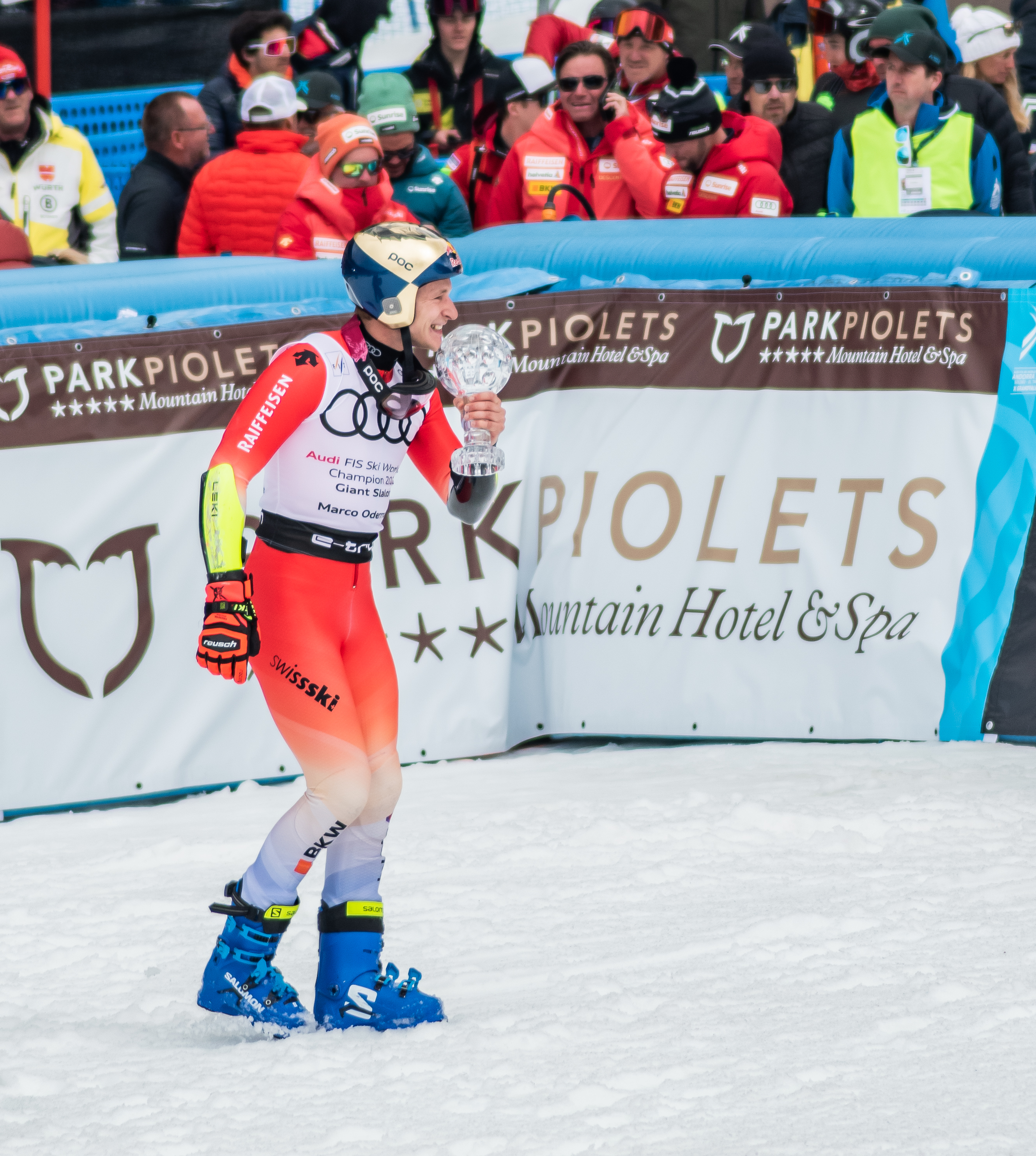
2024 Men's Overall World Cup: Marco Odermatt of Switzerland, overall champion for the third straight season.; 2024 Men's World Cup; Overall • Downhill • Super-G; Giant slalom • Slalom
Previous: 2023	Next: 2025

The men's overall in the 2024 FIS Alpine Skiing World Cup consisted of 35 events in four disciplines: downhill (DH) (8 races), super-G (SG) (7 races), giant slalom (GS) (10 races), and slalom (SL) (10 races). The season was originally scheduled with 45 events, but the first three events of the season (a giant slalom on the glacier at Sölden and two downhills on the Matterhorn) were cancelled due to high winds and heavy snowfall. The cancelled giant slalom was subsequently rescheduled for Aspen on 1 March, and one of the canceled races from Zermatt-Cervinia (the Matterhorn) was rescheduled to Val Gardena/Gröden on 12 December. As discussed under "Season Summary" below, there were additional cancellations and reschedulings after the opening races.

As is the case every fourth year, there were no other major FIS events (world championships or Olympics) taking place during this season. The fifth and sixth current FIS disciplines, parallel (PAR) and Alpine combined (AC), were eliminated from future World Cup schedules due to a lack of participation or interest in staging these events, and a new event that had been contemplated on the tentative schedule for the season, a team combined (which had been planned for 20 January 2024 at Kitzbühel), was also eliminated and replaced with an additional downhill. Thus, for the second straight season, only the four major disciplines were contested.

== Season summary ==
Because of the three straight cancellations to start the season, the only race held before December 2023 was a slalom at Gurgl, won by the Austrian skier Manuel Feller, who thus held the overall lead. The next three races after that, speed events scheduled for Beaver Creek in the U.S., were also cancelled due to high winds and heavy snowfall, bringing the total to six cancellations with only one race held. When the second race was finally contested, all-discipline skier (and 2021 slalom champion) Marco Schwarz of Austria took over the overall lead by finishing second again, with Feller in second overall. However, the very next race, a slalom, was again cancelled due to overnight rains followed by new snow and high winds, bringing the number of cancelled races to seven (and now including each of the four disciplines).

The first speed races were finally held on 14–16 December, and the "battle of the Marcos" was finally underway. Swiss two-time defending overall champion Marco Odermatt's two third-place finishes in the first two speed races propelled him past Schwarz, who only managed a fifth, and into the overall lead by 15 points. At Alta Badia, Odermatt extended his dominance in giant slalom to six in a row, winning both races and jumping out to a lead over Schwarz of 92 points, with everyone else at least 250 points down. However, Schwarz's victory in the next race, a slalom (the only discipline in which Odermatt does not compete) moved Schwarz into the overall lead for the season by 8 points. In the very next race, a downhill in Bormio, the "Battle of the Marcos" came to an end for the season, when Schwarz suffered a season-ending knee injury, while Odermatt finished second and reclaimed the lead. Odermatt's victory in a super-G the next day gave him the season lead in every discipline except slalom and a lead of almost 400 points over his closest competitor who was still active, Aleksander Aamodt Kilde of Norway. Odermatt continued his season-long giant slalom winning streak at Adelboden, extending his lead over Kilde to over 400 points.

The men's tour then headed to the classic courses of Wengen for the Lauberhorn races (two downhills, a super-G, and a slalom) and Kitzbühel for the Hahnenkamm races (two downhills and a slalom). In Wengen, Odermatt increased his lead by winning both downhills and finishing second in the super-G, but the bigger news were season-ending crashes for two former overall season champions: first, in the super-G, Alexis Pinturault of France, and then, in the second downhill, Kilde, which put the second of Odermatt's main rivals out for the season and left Cyprien Sarrazin of France, a former giant slalom skier turned speed specialist, in second place among Odermatt's still-active rivals. In the five speed races in Wengen and Kitzbühel, Sarrazin won three and finished second in the other two, drawing him to within 500 points of Odermatt – but no closer, because Odermatt won the other two, finished second twice and third once, thus allowing Sarrazin an overall gain of only 40 points. When Odermatt won the super-G at Garmisch-Partenkirchen and Sarrazin failed to finish, Odermatt's lead over Sarrazin in the overall championship went back over 600 points. Odermatt also won the giant slalom at Bansko, while the slalom scheduled the next day was rained out and not rescheduled.

Unfortunately for Sarrazin, he then became the latest skier to suffer an injury, this time in training, which forced him to miss at least the next two speed races on the World Cup circuit and for all intents and purposes ended his chances to catch Odermatt. After the races in Kvitfjell, with only 11 races (maximum 1,100 points) remaining in the season, Odermatt held a lead of over 900 points against all competitors. When Odermatt then won the next race, a giant slalom at Palisades Tahoe, USA (his 10th consecutive victory in the discipline), he clinched the overall championship for the season -- his third straight -- with a month (10 races) still to go. The following week at Aspen, Odermatt won two more giant slaloms, but the best performance of the weekend was turned in by his Swiss teammate Loïc Meillard, who placed second in both giant slaloms and then won the slalom on Sunday to move into third place overall for the season, just 3 points behind slalom season champion Manuel Feller. However, the last races before the finals, the technical races scheduled for Kranjska Gora, were cancelled due to a lack of snow (giant slalom) and heavy rains (slalom), which pushed the showdown for second place to the finals.

== Finals ==
The last events of the season are scheduled for the World Cup finals at Saalbach-Hinterglemm, Austria. This season, for the first time, the finals will take place over two weekends—16-17 March 2024 for the technical events and 22–24 March 2024 for the speed events—with the last race for the men (the downhill) taking place on Sunday, 24 March. Only the top 25 in each discipline and the winner of the Junior World Championship in each discipline are eligible to compete in the finals, with the exception that any skier who has scored at least 500 points in the overall classification is eligible to participate in any discipline, regardless of his standing in that discipline for the season. However, only six racers (Odermatt, Feller, Meillard, Sarrazin, former overall champion Henrik Kristoffersen, and speed specialist Vincent Kriechmayr) were able to reach that 500-point threshold prior to the finals. Due to the reduced field, only the top 15 in each discipline will earn World Cup points.

Coming into the finals, Odermatt, with 9 victories in giant slalom and 2 in each of downhill and Super-G, had already tied the all-time men's record of victories in a season with 13. However, while leading the giant slalom final during his second run, Odermatt missed a gate, handing the victory (and overall second place for now) to his Swiss teammate Loïc Meillard. Meillard then finished fourth in slalom and second in super-G to clinch second place for the season, relegating Feller to third. Finally, continuing the season-long string of cancellations, the downhill final was also cancelled due to heavy snow and winds, meaning that ten men's races were cancelled and not made up during the season. However, the cancellation gave Odermatt the season title in downhill, and he had already won the titles in super-G and giant slalom, meaning that Odermatt became the fourth man to win four season-long titles, joining Jean-Claude Killy (1967), Pirmin Zurbriggen (1987, who won five titles if combined were included), and Hermann Maier (2000, 2001).

== Standings ==
#	Skier	DH; 8 races	SG; 7 races	GS; 10 races	SL; 10 races	Total
	(Switzerland) Marco Odermatt	552	495	900	0	1,947
2	(Switzerland) Loïc Meillard	0	196	468	409	1,073
3	(Austria) Manuel Feller	0	0	237	715	952
4	(Norway) Henrik Kristoffersen	0	0	395	359	754
5	(France) Cyprien Sarrazin	510	224	0	0	734
6	(Austria) Vincent Kriechmayr	298	409	0	0	707
7	(Norway) Timon Haugan	0	0	171	450	621
8	(Italy) Dominik Paris	342	197	0	0	539
9	(Germany) Linus Straßer	0	0	6	526	532
10	(Croatia) Filip Zubčić	0	0	402	64	466
11	(Austria) Marco Schwarz	29	45	210	180	464
12	(Norway) Atle Lie McGrath	0	0	244	215	459
13	(Norway) Alexander Steen Olsen	0	0	326	116	442
14	(Norway) Aleksander Aamodt Kilde	220	120	100	0	440
15	(Austria) Raphael Haaser	23	271	114	0	408
16	(France) Clément Noël	0	0	0	397	397
17	(France) Nils Allègre	201	193	0	0	394
18	(Switzerland) Stefan Rogentin	104	244	0	0	348
19	(Slovenia) Zan Kranjec	0	0	347	0	347
20	(Switzerland) Justin Murisier	139	119	77	0	335
21	(Italy) Mattia Casse	185	139	0	0	324
22	(Italy) Alex Vinatzer	0	0	178	145	323
23	(Canada) James Crawford	152	144	15	0	311
24	(United States) Ryan Cochran-Siegle	208	98	0	0	306
25	(Italy) Guglielmo Bosca	55	230	0	0	303
26	(Canada) Cameron Alexander	205	96	0	0	301
27	(Switzerland) Gino Caviezel	0	92	206	0	298
28	(Switzerland) Thomas Tumler	0	0	295	0	295
29	(Switzerland) Daniel Yule	0	0	0	288	288
	(United Kingdom) Dave Ryding	0	0	0	288	288
31	(United States) Bryce Bennett	257	23	0	0	280
32	(United States) River Radamus	0	46	217	12	275
33	(Switzerland) Niels Hintermann	229	31	0	0	260
34	(Switzerland) Marc Rochat	0	0	0	258	258
35	(Canada) Jeffrey Read	52	187	0	0	239
	(Switzerland) Arnaud Boisset	56	183	0	0	239
37	(Austria) Stefan Babinsky	109	128	0	0	237
38	(Switzerland) Franjo von Allmen	103	128	0	0	231
39	(Andorra) Joan Verdú	0	0	221	0	221
40	(Sweden) Kristoffer Jakobsen	0	0	0	217	217
41	(Austria) Dominik Raschner	0	0	29	179	208
42	(France) Alexis Pinturault	38	31	130	0	199
43	(Italy) Florian Schieder	194	2	0	0	196
44	(Austria) Fabio Gstrein	0	0	0	194	194
45	(Austria) Stefan Brennsteiner	0	0	184	0	184
	(Germany) Alexander Schmid	0	0	184	0	184
47	(Norway) Adrian Smiseth Sejersted	65	118	0	0	183
	(Austria) Johannes Strolz	0	0	0	183	183
	(France) Steven Amiez	0	0	0	183	183
50	(Italy) Luca De Aliprandini	0	0	172	0	172
51	(France) Thibaut Favrot	0	0	160	0	160
52	(Italy) Tommaso Sala	0	0	0	158	158
53	(United States) Jared Goldberg	70	78	0	0	148
54	(Switzerland) Luca Aerni	0	0	7	138	145
55	(Croatia) Samuel Kolega	0	0	0	134	134
56	(Belgium) Sam Maes	0	0	108	25	133
57	(Austria) Michael Matt	0	0	0	129	129
58	(France) Blaise Giezendanner	100	26	0	0	126
59	(Austria) Daniel Hemetsberger	26	94	0	0	120
60	(Switzerland) Alexis Monney	99	19	0	0	118
61	(Greece) AJ Ginnis	0	0	0	115	115
62	(Bulgaria) Albert Popov	0	0	0	111	111
63	(Austria) Daniel Danklmaier	56	53	0	0	109
64	(France) Maxence Muzaton	101	0	0	0	101
65	(France) Adrien Théaux	79	20	0	0	99
	(Austria) Otmar Striedinger	78	21	0	0	99
67	(Italy) Christof Innerhofer	69	28	0	0	97
68	(Italy) Giovanni Borsotti	0	9	86	0	95
69	(Finland) Elian Lehto	73	21	0	0	94
70	(Austria) Lukas Feurstein	0	48	45	0	93
71	(United States) Sam Morse	59	32	0	0	91
72	(Italy) Filippo Della Vite	0	0	87	0	87
73	(Germany) Sebastian Holzmann	0	0	0	86	86
	(France) Léo Anguenot	0	0	81	5	86
75	(Croatia) Istok Rodeš	0	0	0	85	85
76	(France) Matthieu Bailet	83	1	0	0	84
	(France) Nils Alphand	65	19	0	0	84
78	(Switzerland) Marco Kohler	58	25	0	0	83
79	(Norway) Rasmus Windingstad	0	0	81	0	81
80	(Slovenia) Miha Hrobat	80	0	0	0	80
	(Germany) Simon Jocher	33	47	0	0	80
82	(United States) Tommy Ford	0	0	79	0	79
83	(Switzerland) Fadri Janutin	0	0	71	0	71
84	(Switzerland) Ramon Zenhäusern	0	0	0	65	65
85	(Italy) Pietro Zazzi	22	42	0	0	64
86	(Austria) Patrick Feurstein	0	0	59	0	59
87	(Germany) Andreas Sander	46	12	0	0	58
88	(Germany) Romed Baumann	45	12	0	0	57
89	(Switzerland) Tanguy Nef	0	0	0	53	53
90	(Belgium) Armand Marchant	0	0	0	48	48
	(United Kingdom) Billy Major	0	0	0	48	48
92	(Austria) Adrian Pertl	0	0	0	47	47
	(Canada) Erik Read	0	0	30	17	47
94	(United States) Kyle Negomir	13	33	0	0	46
95	(Switzerland) Josua Mettler	45	0	0	0	45
96	(United Kingdom) Laurie Taylor	0	0	0	44	44
97	(Italy) Tobias Kastlunger	0	0	0	42	42
98	(United States) Wiley Maple	34	5	0	0	39
99	(France) Victor Muffat-Jeandet	0	0	35	0	35
100	(Spain) Juan del Campo	0	0	0	34	34
	(Norway) Sebastian Foss-Solevåg	0	0	0	34	34
102	(Switzerland) Livio Simonet	0	0	33	0	33
103	(France) Paco Rassat	0	0	0	31	31
104	(Italy) Stefano Gross	0	0	0	30	30
105	(Italy) Hannes Zingerle	0	0	29	0	29
106	(Denmark) Christian Borgnæs	0	0	27	0	27
	(Austria) Christoph Krenn	0	27	0	0	27
108	(Austria) Christopher Neumayer	26	0	0	0	26
109	(United States) Jett Seymour	0	0	0	25	25
	(Norway) Fredrik Møller	1	10	14	0	25
111	(Austria) Joshua Sturm	0	0	8	16	24
112	(Switzerland) Gilles Roulin	4	19	0	0	23
	(United States) Benjamin Ritchie	0	0	0	23	23
114	(Germany) Josef Ferstl	22	0	0	0	22
115	(Switzerland) Sandro Zurbrügg	0	0	21	0	21
	(Germany) Thomas Dreßen	8	13	0	0	21
117	(Austria) Noel Zwischenbrugger	0	0	20	0	20
118	(Germany) Dominik Schwaiger	18	0	0	0	18
	(Germany) Anton Tremmel	0	0	0	18	18
120	(Norway) Eirik Hystad Solberg	0	0	0	13	13
	(Japan) Seigo Kato	0	0	11	2	13
	(Germany) Anton Grammel	0	0	13	0	13
123	(Czech Republic) Jan Zabystřan	11	0	0	0	11
	(Sweden) Fabian Ax Swartz	0	0	0	11	11
	(Lithuania) Andrej Drukarov	0	0	11	0	11
	(France) Florian Loriot	0	11	0	0	11
	(Germany) Fabian Gratz	0	0	11	0	11
128	(France) Mathieu Faivre	0	0	9	0	9
	(Austria) Kilian Pramstaller	0	0	0	9	9
	(Switzerland) Lars Rösti	7	2	0	0	9
131	(Canada) Brodie Seger	5	3	0	0	8
132	(France) Hugo Desgrippes	0	0	0	7	7
	(Austria) Andreas Ploier	0	7	0	0	7
	(Norway) Halvor Hilde Gunleiksrud	0	0	7	0	7
	(United States) Patrick Kenney	0	0	7	0	7
	(Slovakia) Andreas Žampa	0	0	7	0	7
137	(Spain) Joaquim Salarich	0	0	0	6	6
	(Slovenia) Martin Čater	1	5	0	0	6
	(Norway) Theodor Brækken	0	0	0	6	6
140	(Sweden) Mattias Rönngren	0	0	5	0	5
	(Sweden) William Hansson	0	0	5	0	5
	(Italy) Giovanni Franzoni	0	5	0	0	5
143	(Canada) Riley Seger	0	4	0	0	4
	(Australia) Louis Muhlen-Schulte	0	0	4	0	4
	(Spain) Albert Ortega	0	0	4	0	4
	(Austria) Simon Rüland	0	0	0	4	4
147	(France) Sam Alphand	0	3	0	0	3
	(United States) George Steffey	0	0	3	0	3
	(Germany) Jonas Stockinger	0	0	3	0	3
150	(France) Adrien Fresquet	0	2	0	0	2
151	(Germany) Luis Vogt	1	0	0	0	1
	(Canada) Kyle Alexander	0	1	0	0	1

- Leader
- 2nd place
- 3rd place
- Updated on 24 March 2024, after all events.

== See also ==
- 2024 Alpine Skiing World Cup – Men's summary rankings
- 2024 Alpine Skiing World Cup – Men's downhill
- 2024 Alpine Skiing World Cup – Men's super-G
- 2024 Alpine Skiing World Cup – Men's giant slalom
- 2024 Alpine Skiing World Cup – Men's slalom
- 2024 Alpine Skiing World Cup – Women's overall
- World Cup scoring system
