= Patrick Feurstein =

Austrian alpine skier (born 1996)

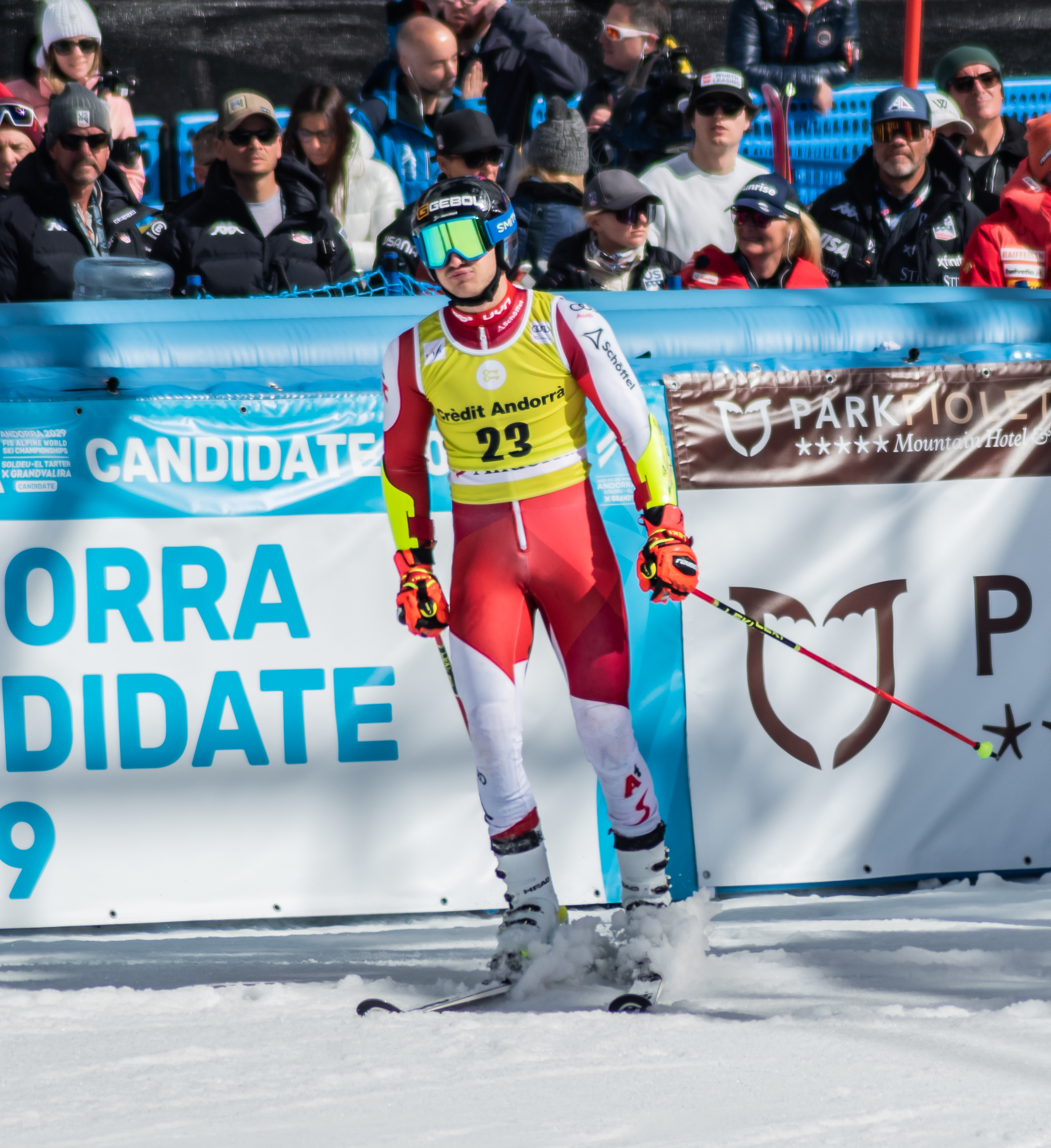
- At Soldeu in March 2023

Personal information
- Born: 1 December 1996 (age 29) Austria
- Family: Lukas Feurstein (cousin)

Skiing career
- Country: Austria
- Sport: Alpine skiing
- Club: SV Mellau - Vorarlberg
- Disciplines: Giant slalom
- World Cup debut: 19 December 2018 (age 23)

Olympics
- Teams: 1 – (2026)
- Medals: 0

World Championships
- Teams: 1 – (2025)
- Medals: 0

World Cup
- Seasons: 3 – (2019–2020, 2022–2026)
- Wins: 0
- Podiums: 1 – (1 GS)
- Overall titles: 0 – (44th in 2025)
- Discipline titles: 0 – (13th in GS, 2025)
- Updated on 28 February 2026

Patrick Feurstein (born December 1, 1996) is an Austrian World Cup alpine ski racer who specializes in giant slalom.

== Career ==
Feurstein was raised in the village of Mellau. He debuted as a junior on December 6, 2011. He competed in his first world cup race on December 19, 2018, at Saalbach-Hinterglemm. A few weeks later, he managed to achieve his first top 30 result, finishing 29th at the giant slalom at Adelboden, but would be later disqualified. The same happened at the slalom two years later at the same location.

He had to leave out on the following 2020/21 season due to suffering from chronic headache, caused by a Neuritis. Feurstein scored his first world cup points on November 14, 2021, at the parallel race at Lech-Zürs. His best result of the season came at the giant slalom of Alta Badia where he finished fourth, narrowly missing out on a podium finish. He would finish second with the Austrian team at the team event at the season finale in Méribel.

On September 10, 2024, Feurstein narrowly avoided a crash with a course worker while competing at the South American Cup at Cerro Castor.

He attained his first World Cup podium on December 14, 2024, in giant slalom at Val d'Isère, France, making up 22 positions after the first run.

== World Cup results ==
=== Season standings ===
Season
Season	Age	Overall	Slalom	Giant slalom	Super-G	Downhill	Combined
2022	25	63	—	18	—	—	29
2023	26	81	—	24	—	—	—N/a
2024	27	86	—	31	—	—	—N/a
2025	28	44	—	13	—	—	—N/a
2026	29	73	—	24	—	—	—N/a

=== Top-ten results ===
- 0 wins
- 1 podium – (1 GS), 6 top tens (6 GS)

Season
Season	Date	Location	Discipline	Place
2022	19 December 2021	Alta Badia, Italy	Giant slalom	4th
2022	19 March 2022	Méribel, France	Giant slalom	7th
2025	27 October 2024	Sölden, Austria	Giant slalom	8th
2025	14 December 2024	Val d'Isère, France	Giant slalom	2nd
2026	13 December 2025	Val d'Isère, France	Giant slalom	9th
2026	21 December 2025	Alta Badia, Italy	Giant slalom	8th

== World Championship results ==
Year
Year	Age	Slalom	Giant slalom	Super-G	Downhill	Team combined	Team event
2025	28	—	16	—	—	—	—

== Olympic results ==
Year
Year	Age	Slalom	Giant slalom	Super-G	Downhill	Team combined
2026	29	—	16	—	—	—

== Personal life ==
Feurstein is a graduate of the Stams Ski Academy. His cousin Lukas Feurstein (b. 2001) is also a World Cup alpine ski racer, specializing in super-G and giant slalom.
