= Lukas Feurstein =

Austrian alpine ski racer

Personal information
- Born: 18 May 2001 (age 25) Austria
- Height: 1.83 m (6 ft 0 in)
- Family: Patrick Feurstein (cousin)

Skiing career
- Country: Austria
- Sport: Alpine skiing
- Club: SV Mellau - Vorarlberg
- Disciplines: Super-G, Giant slalom
- World Cup debut: 20 March 2021 (age 19)

World Championships
- Teams: 1 – (2025)
- Medals: 0

World Cup
- Seasons: 6 – (2021–2026)
- Wins: 1 – (1 SG)
- Podiums: 2 – (2 SG)
- Overall titles: 0 – (34th in 2025)
- Discipline titles: 0 – (9th in SG, 2025)
Medal record
Men's alpine skiing
Representing Austria
International alpine ski competitions
Junior World Championships
Gold medal – first place	2021 Bansko	Giant Slalom
Silver medal – second place	2021 Bansko	Super-G
European Youth Olympic Festival
Silver medal – second place	2019 Sarajevo	Mixed team
Bronze medal – third place	2019 Sarajevo	Slalom
- Updated on 28 February 2026

Lukas Feurstein (born 18 May 2001) is an Austrian World Cup alpine ski racer who specializes in super-G and giant slalom.

== Career ==
Feurstein was raised in the village of Mellau in Vorarlberg, and debuted as a junior in November 2017. In February 2019, he won two medals at the 2019 European Youth Olympic Winter Festival in Sarajevo, finishing second in the mixed team event and third in the slalom.

At the 2021 Junior World Championships in Bansko, Bulgaria, Feurstein secured a win in the giant slalom as well as a silver medal in the super-G. This earned an invitation to compete in the super-G event of the World Cup finals at Lenzerheide, where he finished 19th.

In December 2021, Feurstein suffered bilateral tibial contusion when he crashed at race in Zinal, Switzerland. He was able to return into racing a few weeks later and was third in the super-G standings for the Europa Cup season, which secured a spot for the next World Cup season.

On 28 January 2023, Feurstein achieved his first top ten result in the World Cup, finishing sixth in the super-G at Cortina d'Ampezzo, Italy. He crashed out in the following race, suffering from a medial ligament tear and missing out on the remainder of the season.

Feurstein achieved his first World Cup podium on 7 December 2024, in a super-G at Beaver Creek, Colorado, US. His first win (and second podium) came a few months later at the World Cup finals in March, taking the super-G at Sun Valley, Idaho, US.

== World Cup results ==
=== Season standings ===
Season
Season	Age	Overall	Slalom	Giant slalom	Super-G	Downhill
2023	21	100	—	—	32	—
2024	22	70	—	32	25	—
2025	23	34	—	35	9	—
2026	24	56	—	31	19	—

=== Top-ten results ===
- 1 win – (1 SG)
- 2 podiums – (2 SG), 8 top tens (6 SG, 2 GS)

Season
Season	Date	Location	Discipline	Place
2023	28 January 2023	Cortina d'Ampezzo, Italy	Super-G	6th
2024	24 February 2024	Palisades Tahoe, United States	Giant slalom	10th
2025	7 December 2024	Beaver Creek, United States	Super-G	3rd
2025	17 January 2025	Wengen, Switzerland	Super-G	10th
2025	23 February 2025	Crans-Montana, Switzerland	Super-G	9th
2025	23 March 2025	Sun Valley, United States	Super-G	1st
2026	27 November 2025	Copper Mountain, United States	Super-G	6th
2026	7 December 2025	Beaver Creek, United States	Super-G	10th

== World Championship results ==
Year
Year	Age	Slalom	Giant slalom	Super-G	Downhill	Team combined	Team event
2025	23	—	—	11	—	—	—

== Personal life ==
His cousin Patrick Feurstein (b.1996) is also a World Cup alpine ski racer, specializing in giant slalom.
