= Roselda Joux =

Italian alpine skier (born 1950)

Roselda Joux (born 31 March 1950 in Aosta) is an Italian former alpine skier who competed several years in the FIS World Cup, earning as her career best result a 5th place in a slalom race held at Abetone in 1968.

Her daughter Sonia Viérin (born 1977) and her granddaughter Sophie Mathiou (born 2002) are world-class Alpine skiers as well.
