= World Junior Alpine Skiing Championships 2020 =

International skiing competition

FIS Alpine Junior World Ski Championships 2020

The World Junior Alpine Skiing Championships 2020 were the 39th World Junior Alpine Skiing Championships, held between 7 and 11 March 2020 in Narvik, Norway.

== Schedule ==
All times are local (UTC+1).

Date	Time	Events
7 March	10:30	Ladies downhill
7 March	12:00	Men downhill
8 March	11:30	Ladies Super-G
8 March	13:30	Men Super-G
9 March	10:30	Ladies combined – Super-G
9 March	13:00	Ladies combined – Slalom
10 March		Men combined – Super-G
10 March		Men combined – Slalom
11 March	10:00	Ladies giant slalom first run
11 March	13:30	Ladies giant slalom second run
12 March	10:00	Men giant slalom first run
12 March	13:30	Men giant slalom second run
13 March	12:00	Ladies slalom first run
13 March	13:30	Men slalom first run
13 March	18:00	Ladies slalom second run
13 March	19:15	Men slalom second run
14 March
14 March	12:00	Team event

== Medal summary ==
=== Men's events ===
Event	Gold		Silver		Bronze	
Downhill	Alexis Monney; Switzerland	1:02.38	Simon Talacci; Italy	1:02.55	Stefan Rieser; Austria	1:02.61
Super-G	Stefan Rieser; Austria	1:06.47	Armin Dornauer; Austria	1:06.98	Yannick Chabloz; Switzerland	1:07.01
Giant Slalom	Cancelled due to the COVID-19 pandemic					
Slalom	Cancelled due to the COVID-19 pandemic					
Combined	Cancelled due to the COVID-19 pandemic					

=== Ladies events ===
Event	Gold		Silver		Bronze	
Downhill	Magdalena Egger; Austria	1:03.87	Lisa Grill; Austria	1:03.96	Monica Zanoner; Italy	1:04.53
Super-G	Magdalena Egger; Austria	1:08.10	Lisa Grill; Austria	1:08.38	Karen Smadja-Clément; France	1:08.39
Giant Slalom	Sara Rask; Sweden	2:04.91	Neja Dvornik; Slovenia	2:05.39	Kaja Norbye; Norway	2:05.53
Slalom	Cancelled due to the COVID-19 pandemic					
Combined	Magdalena Egger; Austria	1:39.23	Lisa Grill; Austria	1:39.76	Keely Cashman; United States	1:40.33

=== Team event ===
Event	Gold	Silver	Bronze
Team event	Cancelled due to the COVID-19 pandemic		

=== Medal table ===
* Host nation (Norway)

Rank	Nation	Gold	Silver	Bronze	Total
1	Austria (AUT)	4	4	1	9
2	Switzerland (SUI)	1	0	1	2
3	Sweden (SWE)	1	0	0	1
4	Italy (ITA)	0	1	1	2
5	Slovenia (SLO)	0	1	0	1
6	France (FRA)	0	0	1	1
6	Norway (NOR)*	0	0	1	1
6	United States (USA)	0	0	1	1
Totals (8 entries)		6	6	6	18
