= Sophie Mathiou =

Italian alpine skier (born 2002)

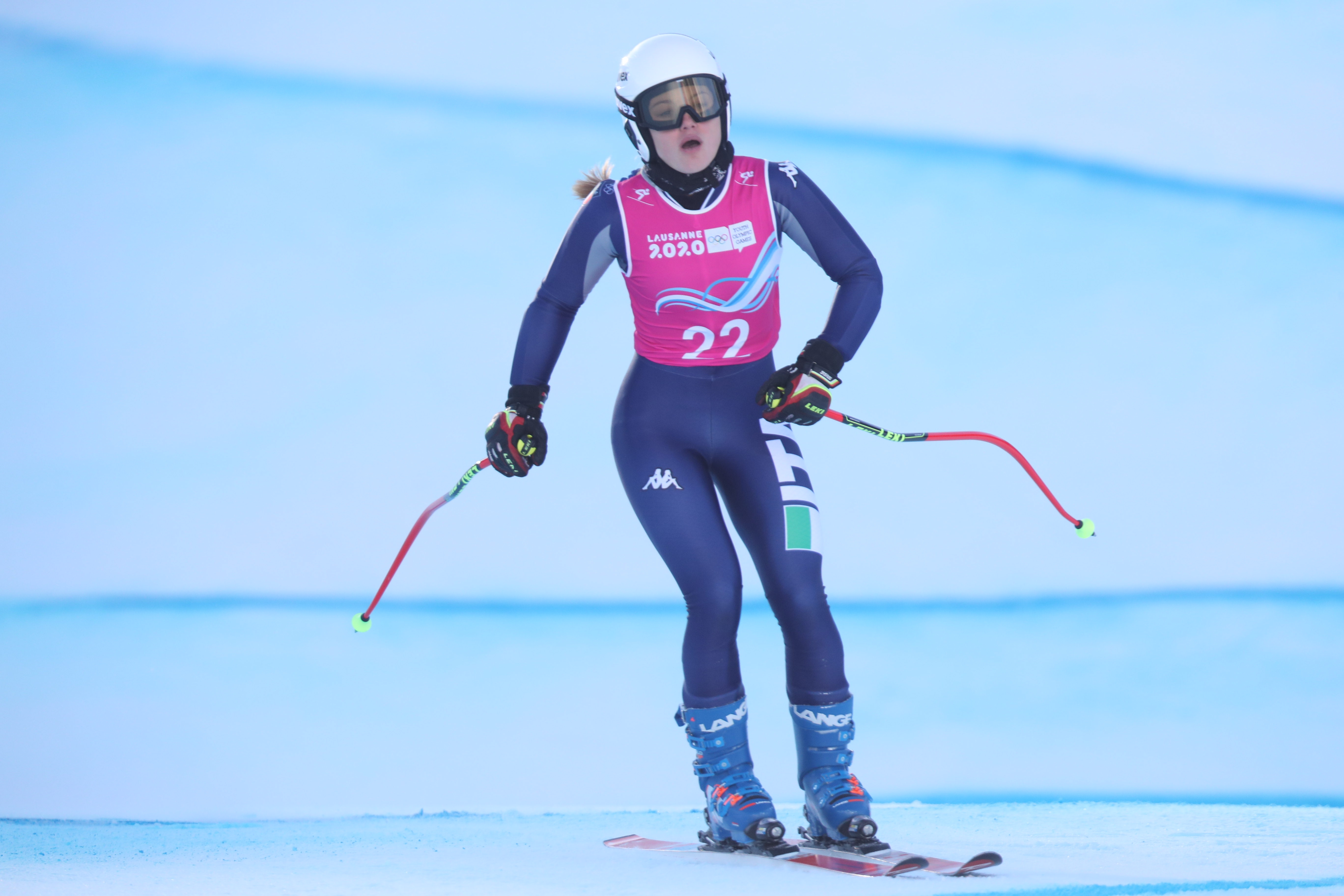
- Sophie Mathiou competing at the 2020 Winter Youth Olympics in Lausanne

Personal information
- Born: 5 February 2002 (age 24) Aosta, Aosta Valley, Italy
- Website: sophiemathiou.com

Skiing career
- Sport: Alpine skiing
- Club: CS Carabinieri
- Disciplines: Slalom, giant slalom, super-G, combined
- World Cup debut: 19 March 2021 (age 19)

Olympics
- Teams: 0

World Championships
- Teams: 0
- Medals: 0

World Cup
- Seasons: 1
- Wins: 0
- Podiums: 0
- Overall titles: 0
- Discipline titles: 0
Medal record
Junior World Championships
Gold medal – first place	2021 Bansko	Slalom

Sophie Mathiou (born 5 February 2002 in Aosta) is an Italian alpine skier, competing in almost all disciplines, with a focus in slalom, in which she has won the 2021 world junior title.

Mathiou made her World Cup debut in March 2021 at age 19. She lives in Gressan, Aosta Valley.

Two Alpine skiers from her family have previously participated in world-class competitions: her grandmother Roselda Joux (born 1950) and her aunt Sonia Viérin (born 1977).
