= Tifany Roux =

French alpine skier (born 1997)

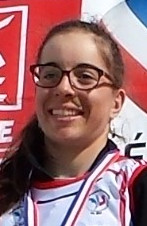

Personal information
- Born: 29 September 1997 (age 28) France

Skiing career
- Sport: Alpine skiing
- Disciplines: Super-G, Alpine combined

World Championships
- Teams: 1 - (2021)

World Cup
- Seasons: 3 – (2019-2021)
- Wins: 0
- Podiums: 0
- Overall titles: 0 – (89th in 2020)
- Discipline titles: 0 – (16th in AC, 2020)

Tifany Roux (born 29 September 1997) is a French World Cup alpine ski racer. She made her World Cup debut on 24 February 2019 in Crans-Montana, Switzerland.

== World Cup results ==
=== Season standings ===
Season	Age	Overall	Slalom	Giant slalom	Super-G	Downhill	Combined
2019	21	124	—	—	—	—	24
2020	22	89	—	—	—	—	16
2021	23	95	—	—	39	—	—

Standings through 13 February 2021

== World Championship results ==
Year	Age	Slalom	Giant slalom	Super-G	Downhill	Combined
2021	23			34	–	
