= Sonia Viérin =

Italian alpine skier (born 1977)

Sonia Viérin (born 25 October 1977 in Aosta) is an Italian former alpine skier who competed in the 2002 Winter Olympics.

Her mother Roselda Joux (born 1950) and her nephew Sophie Mathiou (born 2002) are world-class Alpine skiers as well.
