= Damüls-Mellau =

Ski resort Vorarlberg, Austria

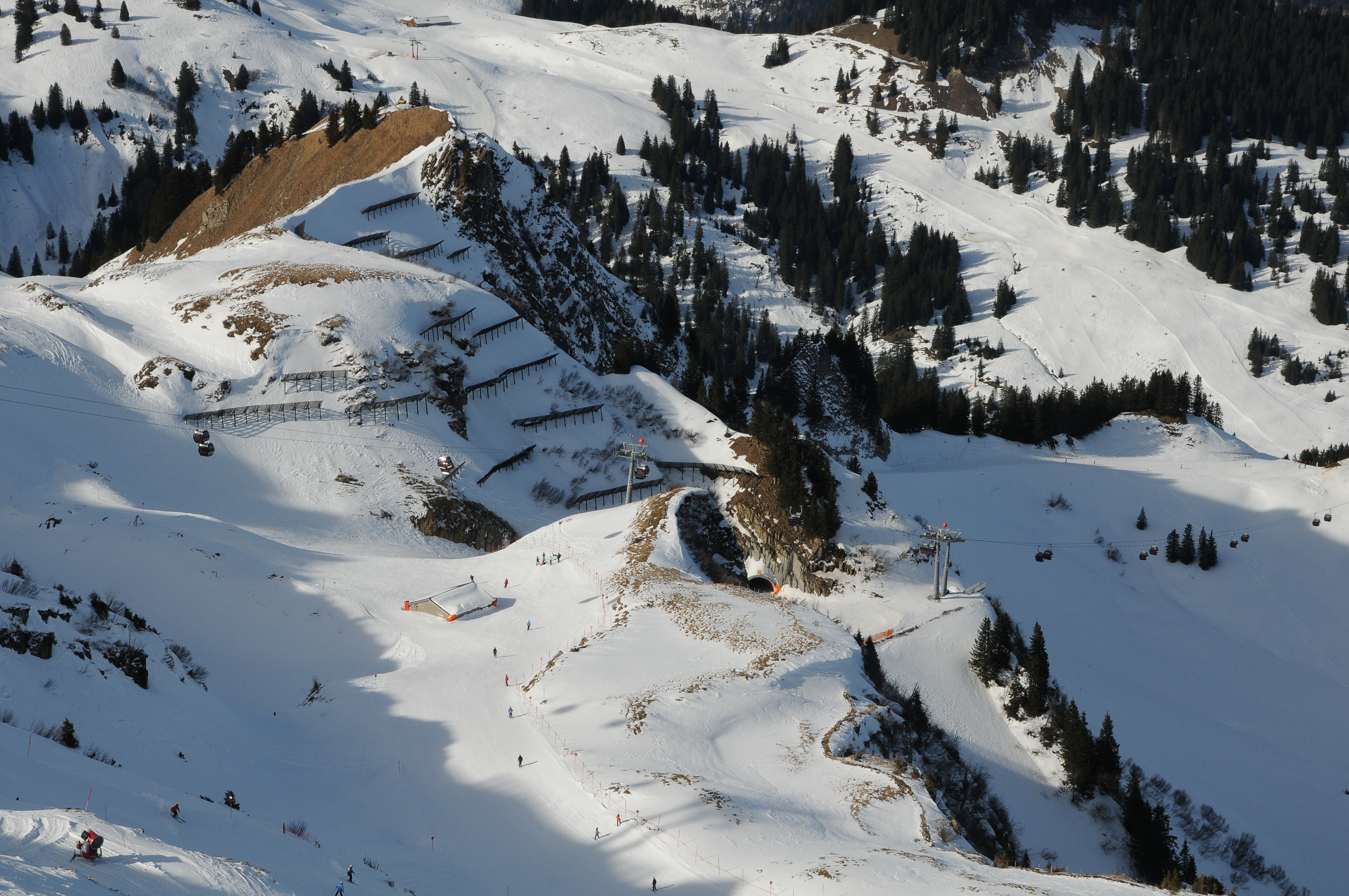
- Interactive map of Damüls-Mellau
- Location: Vorarlberg, Austria
- Nearest city: Feldkirch (40 km), Dornbirn (42 km)
- Coordinates: 47.2801°N 9.890°E
- Top elevation: 2,050 m (6,730 ft)
- Base elevation: 690 m (2,260 ft)
- Skiable area: 109 km
- Lift system: 2 cable cars; 15 chairlifts; 10 practice lifts
- Snowfall: Guaranteed snow with an average of over 9 m of new snow per year and snow-making equipment, snow safety from the beginning of December to April
- Website: https://www.damuels.travel/en/skiarea

Damüls-Mellau is a ski resort in Vorarlberg, Austria. It is most popular for its snow safety. In 2006, the village Damüls was awarded the honorary title 'snowiest village of the world'.

== Geography ==
The ski area Damüls-Mellau extends at an altitude between 700 m (village Mellau) and 2,050 m (mountain station Ragazer Blanken) in the rear Bregenzerwald. The villages in and around the ski resort are Damüls (1,430 m) and Mellau (688m).

From Mellau, a detachable 10-seater gondola lift leads up to the ski area and the Roßstelle. From Damüls, ski lifts lead directly into the ski area. About 80% of the houses in Damüls are located on the slopes or a maximum of 100 m away of a slope. This makes Damüls popular for "ski-in ski-out".

== Pistes ==
In Damüls-Mellau, there are 27.6km of easy pistes (blue), 50.5km pistes of medium difficulty (red), 9.7km of difficult (black) as well as 21.2km of freeride routes.

=== Snow park ===
The snow park consists of several snowparks, which are connected with each other (Mainpark, UGA-park, Kidspark, uga-all-MTN-line, Ragaz Pro Line). In total, the snowparks have a size of approximately 85,000 m^{2} with approximately 2000m of freestyle slopes. There are a total of 40 freeride elements, including a halfpipe, waverides, jumps, corners and boxes.

=== Cross-country trails ===
The ski area offers 2 cross-country trails (11km) at an altitude between 1,500m and 1,700m. The Unterdamüls trail is about 6 km long and hardly varies in height. The sunny cross-country trail Stofel in Oberdamüls is about 5km long.

=== Tobogganing ===
The toboggan run has a length of 2,5km and is illuminated for tobogganing two nights a week.

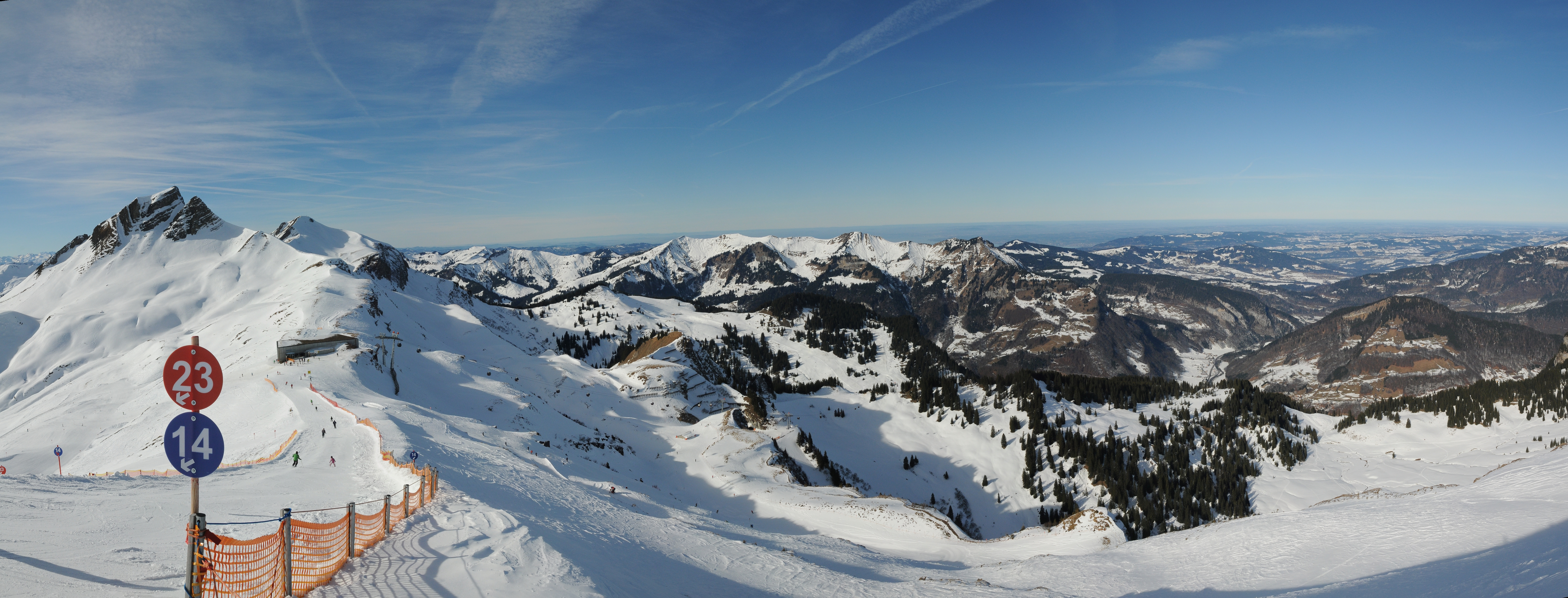
Panoramic view of the Mittagsspitze in the Damüls-Mellau ski area

== Lift system ==
The area provides 29 lifts and cable cars, one of the best snowparks in western Austria and a 120 m illuminated ski tunnel. Moreover, there are 5 practice areas with child-friendly lifts and conveyor belts.

	Name	Length	Type	Capacity (number of people per hour)
1	Mellaubahn	2,040 m	10-seater gondola (detachable)	3146
2	Gipfelbahn	1,851 m	8-seater gondola (detachable)	2400
3	Roßstellenbahn	638 m	8-seater chair lift (detachable)	3400
4	Sunneggbahn	1,119 m	6-seater chair lift (detachable)	2400
5	Ragazer Bahn	1,404	6-seater chair lift (detachable)	2400
6	Elsenkopfbahn	750 m	6-seater chair lift (detachable)	2600
7	Hohe Wacht Bahn	1,060 m	6-seater chair lift (detachable)	2400
8	Hasenbühel	1,900 m	6-seater chair lift (detachable)	2400
9	Suttisbahn	1,150 m	6-seater chair lift (detachable)	2214
10	Wildgunten	1,210 m	6-seater chair lift (detachable)	2400
11	Uga-Express	1,600 m	4-seater chair lift (detachable)	2200
12	Furkalift	600 m	4-seater chair lift	1800
13	Walisgaden Lift	600 m	double chair lift	1440
14	Oberdamülser Lift	1,400 m	double chair lift	1440
15	Hohes Licht Lift	1,200 m	double chair lift	1440
16	SL KItzebühel	490 m	double drag lift	800
17	SL Sunnegg	220 m	drag lift	800
18	Easy Cheesy Lift	100 m	kids' drag lift	720
19	Hasenlift	112 m	kids' drag lift	800
20	Riedboden Indianer 1	50 m	conveyor belt	
21	Riedboden Indianer 2	30 m	conveyor belt	
22	Alpenblume Bunny	30 m	conveyor belt	

== Photo gallery ==
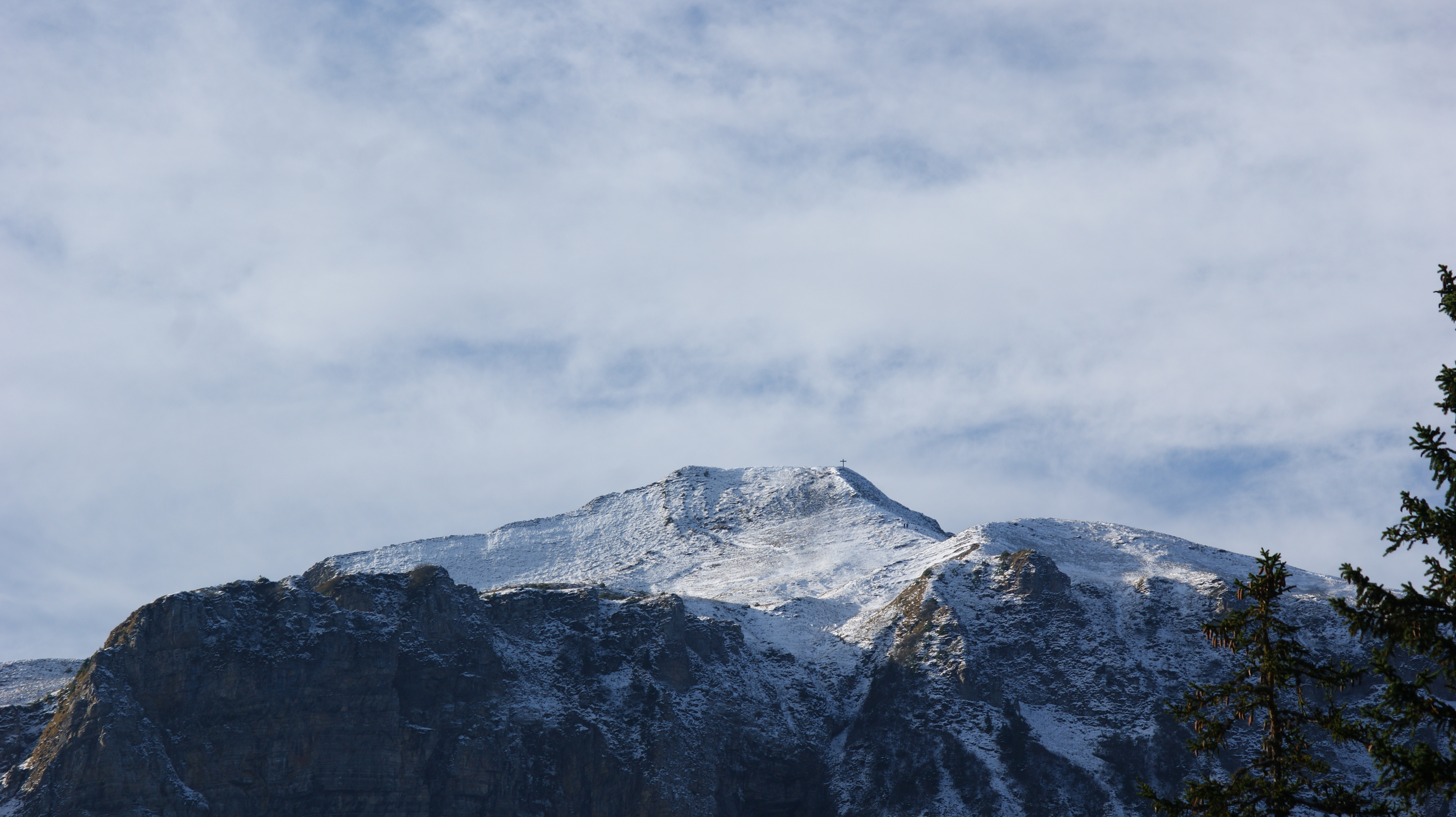
View to the Hochblanken mountain, standing at the Alpe Roßstelle in Mellau

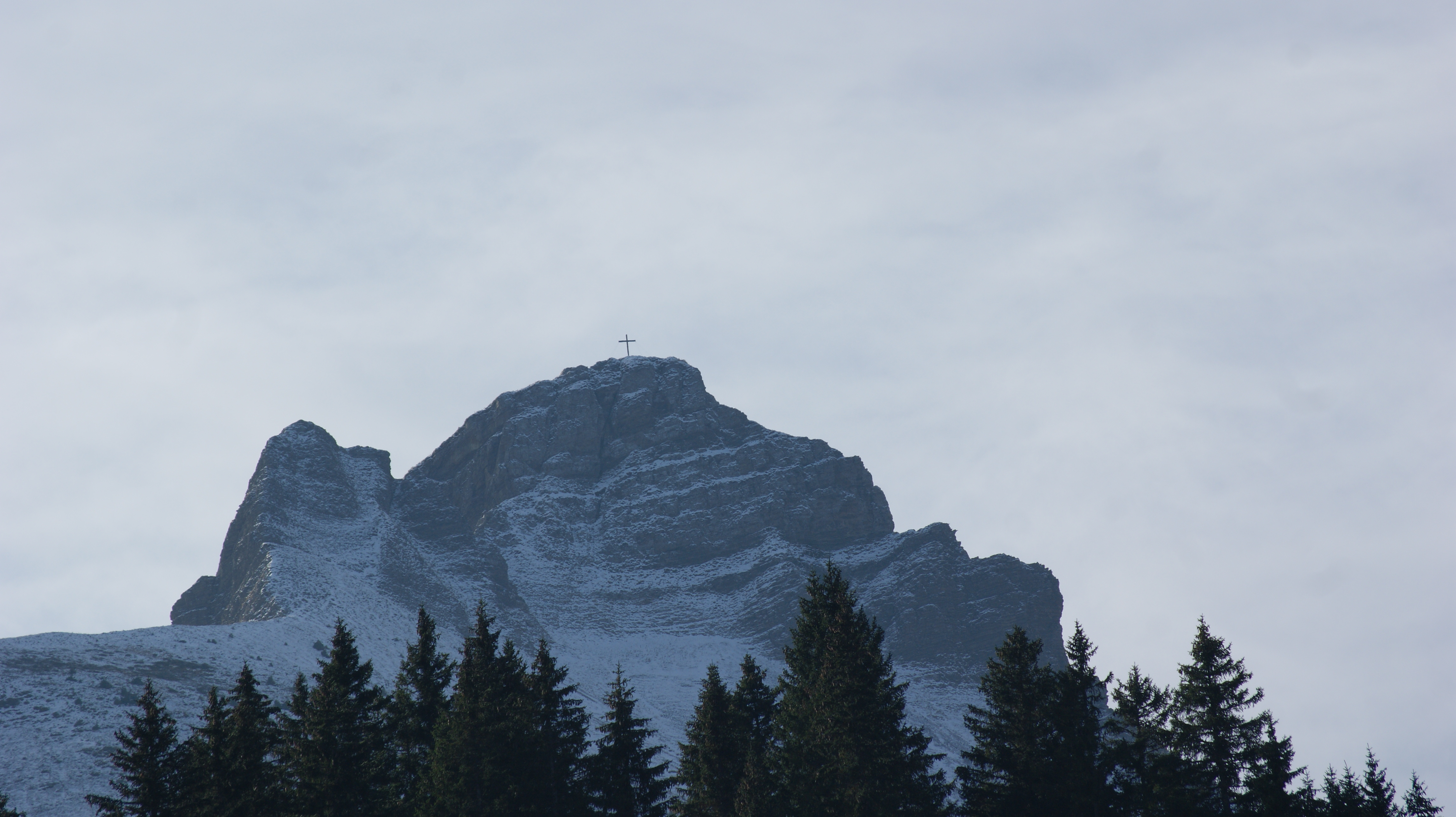
Damülser Mittagsspitze (standing at the Alpe Roßstelle in Mellau)

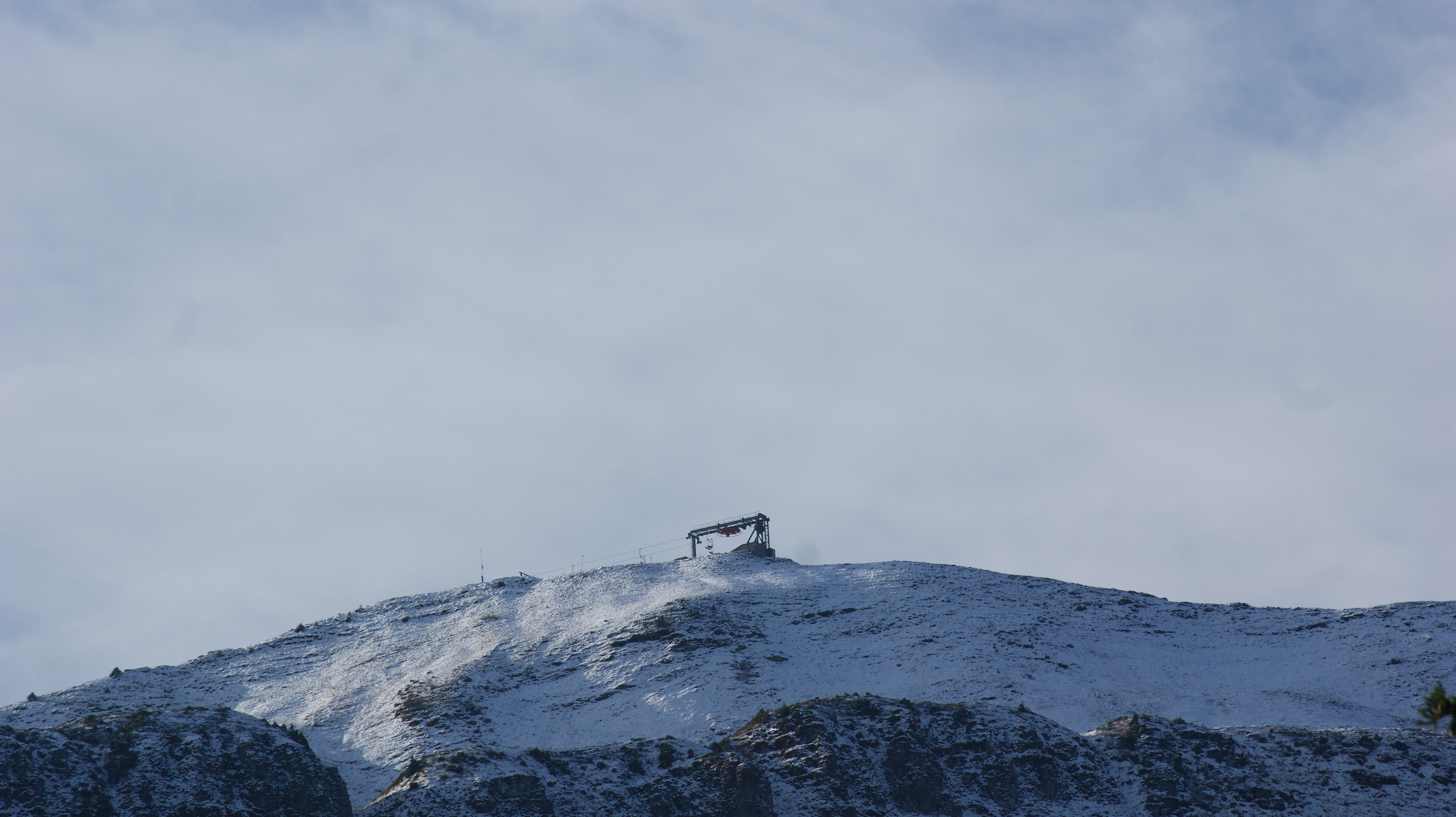
The top station of the chairlift "Hohes Licht" in Damüls
