= Norbert Bischofberger =

Austrian scientist

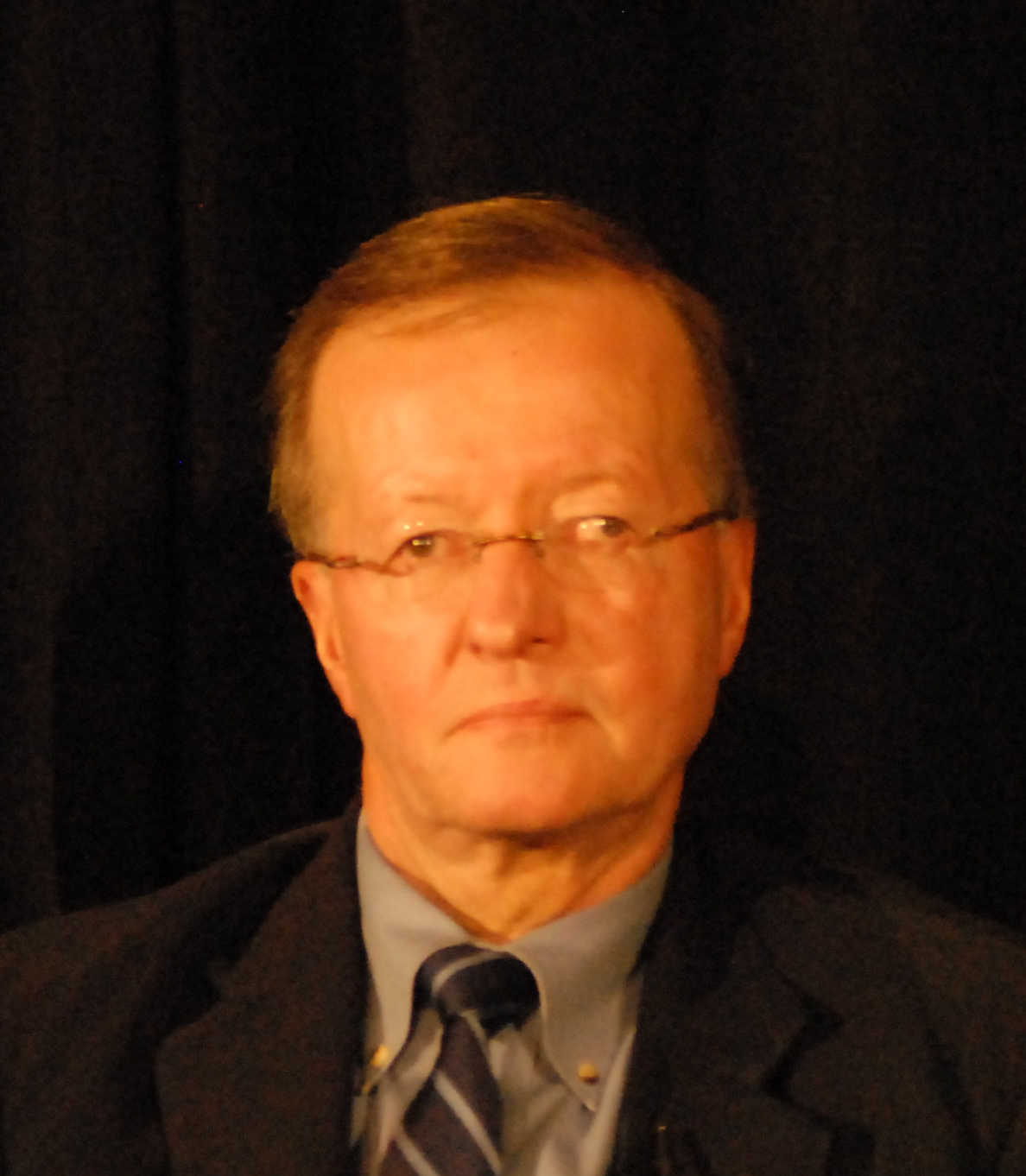
- Born: January 10, 1956 (age 70); Mellau, Austria
- Education: University of Innsbruck, ETH Zurich
- Known for: antiviral drugs
- Scientific career
- Doctoral advisor: Oskar Jeger
- Other academic advisors: George M. Whitesides

Dr. Norbert Bischofberger (born 10 January 1956 in Mellau, Austria) is an Austrian scientist. He is one of the inventors of the antiviral drug Tamiflu generically known as oseltamivir, to treat influenza A and B as well as the 2009 Pandemic H1N1 (swine flu), the spread of which caused an ongoing pandemic in 2009. During his tenure at Gilead Sciences, Bischofberger helped lead the development of other antiviral drugs for infectious diseases, such as Truvada for HIV and Sovaldi for hepatitis C. Bischofberger was the President & Chief Executive Officer of Kronos Bio, and previously was the Executive Vice President, Research and Development and Chief Scientific Officer at Gilead Sciences, a biopharmaceutical company specializing in antivirals.

== Education ==
Bischofberger has received a Bachelor of Science in Chemistry from the University of Innsbruck, a Ph.D. in Organic Chemistry at the ETH Zurich with Oskar Jeger, and has done postdoctoral work at Harvard University with George M. Whitesides and Syntex Research.

== Tamiflu ==
He worked as part of the DNA synthesis group at Genentech from 1986 to 1990, before joining Gilead in 1990 as Director of Organic Chemistry. In 1993, he began work, as head of a team, to create Tamiflu. In 1996, clinical studies were carried out on the drug, which was the first orally active commercially developed anti-influenza medication. Explaining the motivation behind this, he said, "We decided to create a pill and not a medication to inhale because especially people who suffer from influenza struggle with breathing difficulties. And the agent would only reach the lung," Three years later, the right to market and develop Tamiflu were sold to Roche, with Bischofberger and Gilead retaining the intellectual rights to it.

Bischofberger has publicly displayed pessimism over the risk viruses pose, saying, "I think the threat by new bacterial or viral agents is higher than the potential of a nuclear war."

== Other activities ==
- Kronos Bio, President & Chief Executive Officer, Member of the Board of Directors (since 2018)
- Morphic Therapeutics, Member of the Board of Directors (since 2019)
- Bayer, Member of the supervisory board (since 2017)
- InCarda Therapeutics, Member of the Board of Directors (since 2016)
