= World Junior Alpine Skiing Championships 2021 =

International skiing competition

FIS Alpine Junior World Ski Championships 2021
- Location: Bansko, Bulgaria
- Dates: 3–10 March

The 2021 World Junior Alpine Skiing Championships were held from 3 to 10 March 2021 in Bansko, Bulgaria.

== Schedule ==
All times are local (UTC+2).

| Date | Time | Events |
|---|---|---|
| 3 March | 11:00 | Men's super-G |
| 4 March | 10:00; 13:00 | Men's giant slalom |
| 5 March | 09:00; 11:30 | Men's slalom |
| 8 March | 11:00 | Women's super-G |
| 9 March | 10:00; 13:00 | Women's giant slalom |
| 10 March | 09:00; 11:30 | Women's slalom |

== Medal summary ==
=== Men's events ===
| Event | Gold | | Silver | | Bronze | |
|---|---|---|---|---|---|---|
| Super-G | Giovanni Franzoni; Italy | 49.70 | Lukas Feurstein; Austria | 49.74 | Gaël Zulauf; Switzerland | 49.75 |
| Giant slalom | Lukas Feurstein; Austria | 1:45.33 | Giovanni Franzoni; Italy | 1:46.05 | Kaspar Kindem; Norway | 1:46.22 |
| Slalom | Benjamin Ritchie; United States | 1:40.36 | Fadri Janutin; Switzerland | 1:40.84 | Joshua Sturm; Austria | 1:41.06 |

=== Women's events ===
| Event | Gold | | Silver | | Bronze | |
|---|---|---|---|---|---|---|
| Super-G | Lena Wechner; Austria | 53.32 | Magdalena Kappaurer; Austria | 53.56 | Magdalena Egger; Austria | 53.69 |
| Giant slalom | Hanna Aronsson Elfman; Sweden | 1:46.54 | Marte Monsen; Norway | 1:47.29 | Neja Dvornik; Slovenia | 1:47.42 |
| Slalom | Sophie Mathiou; Italy | 1:40.24 | Moa Boström Müssener; Sweden | 1:40.44 | AJ Hurt; United States | 1:40.45 |

=== Medal table ===
| Rank | Nation | Gold | Silver | Bronze | Total |
|---|---|---|---|---|---|
| 1 | Austria | 2 | 2 | 2 | 6 |
| 2 | Italy | 2 | 1 | 0 | 3 |
| 3 | Sweden | 1 | 1 | 0 | 2 |
| 4 | United States | 1 | 0 | 1 | 2 |
| 5 | Norway | 0 | 1 | 1 | 2 |
| 5 | Switzerland | 0 | 1 | 1 | 2 |
| 7 | Slovenia | 0 | 0 | 1 | 1 |
| Totals (7 entries) | | 6 | 6 | 6 | 18 |
