= FIS Skimuseum Damüls =

Skiing museum in Austria

- Established: 2013
- Location: Damüls, Vorarlberg, Austria
- Type: Skiing, local history
- Collection size: 3,000
- Curator: Christian Lingenhöle

The FIS Skimuseum Damüls is a skiing museum located in Damüls in Vorarlberg (Austria).

It is accommodated in the Kulisse Pfarrhof and displays exhibitions about local history and winter sports. After the exhibition was completely redesigned in the summer of 2017, it was certified by the International Ski Federation (FIS) and remains Vorarlberg's only FIS ski museum.

== The building ==
The Damüls parsonage is located directly below the church of St. Nikolaus in Damüls and had been empty for several years. On the basis of an initiative of Christian Lingenhöle, the two buildings (house and stable) were adapted accordingly and opened after minor alterations in the summer of 2013 as "Kulisse Pfarrhof".

== The exhibition ==
The museum tackles the village's 700-year history as well as its 120-year history of skiing. Damüls is one of the few original settlements of the Walser people, dating back to the 14th century. Exhibits, primarily collected by Christian Lingenhöle, provide insights into the rich history of skiing in the village.

The museum features an extensive collection of historic and modern skis including original racing skis from 1957 by ski legend Toni Sailer. In addition to skis, the focus is also on winter-sports equipment and memorabilia, clothing, photographs, literature and documents. Some curiosities illustrate the way in which past generations have experimented with skiing. A library and a historical archive are currently being built.

=== Special exhibitions ===
- 2019: "Pioneering spirit – how people shaped tourism" (portrayals of people who were active in the founding years of tourism in Damüls)
- 2020: "Second home – Damüls regulars tell stories"
- 2021: "Reinhold Simma and Damüls" (Reinhold Simma, who came from the Bregenzerwald, was the last pastor of Damüls. Father Simma is still remembered by many people in Damüls and far beyond. He was a formative personality of the place, which influenced some developments, not least in tourism.)
