= Eirik Hystad Solberg =

Norwegian alpine skier (born 2002)

Personal information
- Born: 14 October 2002 (age 24)

Skiing career
- Country: Norway
- Sport: Alpine skiing
- Club: Skiforeningen Stavanger
- Disciplines: Slalom, Giant slalom
- World Cup debut: 21 January 2024 (age 21)

Olympics
- Teams: 1 – (2026)
- Medals: 0

World Cup
- Seasons: 3 – (2024–2026)
- Podiums: 1
- Overall titles: 0 – (29th in 2026)
- Discipline titles: 0 – (16th in SL, 2026)

Eirik Hystad Solberg (born 14 October 2002) is a Norwegian World Cup alpine ski racer who specializes in the slalom and giant slalom disciplines. He represented Norway at the 2026 Winter Olympics.

== Career ==
Hystad Solberg made his World Cup debut on 21 January 2024.

In January 2026, he was selected to represent Norway at the 2026 Winter Olympics. He competed in the giant slalom and slalom events.

On 22 November 2026, during the 2026–27 FIS Alpine Ski World Cup, he earned his first career World Cup podium, finishing in second in the slalom.

== World Cup results ==
=== Season standings ===
Season
| Season | Age | Overall | Slalom | Giant slalom | Super-G | Downhill |
| 2024 | 21 | 120 | 45 | — | — | — |
| 2025 | 22 | 142 | 52 | — | — | — |
| 2026 | 23 | 29 | 16 | 28 | — | — |
| 2027 | 24 | 8 | — | 8 | — | — |

Standings through 26 October 2026

=== Top-ten finishes ===
- 0 podiums, 5 top tens (4 SL, 1 GS)

Season
| Season | Date | Location | Discipline | Place |
| 2026 | 7 January 2026 | Madonna di Campiglio, Italy | Slalom | 5th |
| 2026 | 18 January 2026 | Wengen, Switzerland | Slalom | 10th |
| 2026 | 28 January 2026 | Schladming, Austria | Slalom | 8th |
| 2026 | 8 March 2026 | Kranjska Gora, Slovenia | Slalom | 8th |
| 2027 | 25 October 2026 | Sölden, Austria | Giant slalom | 8th |

== Olympic results ==
Year
| Year | Age | Slalom | Giant; Slalom | Super G | Downhill | Team combined |
| 2026 | 23 | 7 | DNF1 | — | — | — |
