= World Junior Alpine Skiing Championships 2022 =

International skiing competition

- Location: Invermere, Canada
- Dates: 3–9 March

The 2022 World Junior Alpine Skiing Championships was held from 3rd to 9th March, 2022 in Panorama Ski Resort in Invermere, Canada.

== Medal summary ==
=== Men's events ===
| Event | Gold | | Silver | | Bronze | |
|---|---|---|---|---|---|---|
| Downhill | Giovanni Franzoni; Italy | 1:25.56 | Franjo von Allmen; Switzerland | 1:25.80 | Luis Vogt; Germany | 1:26.15 |
| Super-G | Isaiah Nelson; United States | 1:06.57 | Franjo von Allmen; Switzerland | 1:06.70 | Giovanni Franzoni; Italy | 1:06.98 |
| Combined | Giovanni Franzoni; Italy | 2:02.88 | Marco Abbruzzese; Italy | 2:02.94 | Not awarded | |
| Combined | Giovanni Franzoni; Italy | 2:02.88 | Franjo von Allmen; Switzerland | 2:02.94 | Not awarded | |
| Giant Slalom | Alexander Steen Olsen; Norway | 2:39.24 | Filippo Della Vite; Italy | 2:39.84 | Lukas Paßrugger; Austria | 2:40.14 |
| Slalom | Alexander Steen Olsen; Norway | 1:33.11 | Fabian Ax Swartz; Sweden | 1:34.12 | Linus Witte; Germany | 1:34.25 |

=== Women's events ===
| Event | Gold | | Silver | | Bronze | |
|---|---|---|---|---|---|---|
| Downhill | Magdalena Egger; Austria | 1:28.33 | Emma Aicher; Germany | 1:28.46 | Lauren Macuga; United States | 1:28.58 |
| Super-G | Magdalena Egger; Austria | 1:08.34 | Ava Sunshine Jemison; United States | 1:08.79 | Victoria Olivier; Austria | 1:09.05 |
| Combined | Marie Lamure; France | 2:03.73 | Magdalena Egger; Austria | 2:04.10 | Aline Höpli; Switzerland | 2:04.37 |
| Giant Slalom | Magdalena Egger; Austria | 2:31.02 | Emma Aicher; Germany | 2:31.24 | Zrinka Ljutić; Croatia | 2:32.03 |
| Slalom | Zrinka Ljutić; Croatia | 1:39.88 | Emma Aicher; Germany | 1:40.72 | Moa Boström Müssener; Sweden | 1:41.09 |

=== Mixed events ===
| Event | Gold | Silver | Bronze |
|---|---|---|---|
| Team parallel | Canada; Cassidy Gray; Étienne Mazellier; Justine Lamontagne; Raphaël Lessard | Austria; Victoria Olivier; Joshua Sturm; Magdalena Egger; Lukas Paßrugger | Switzerland; Delphine Darbellay; Reto Mächler; Delia Durrer; Eric Wyler |

=== Medal table ===
* Host nation (Canada)

| Rank | Nation | Gold | Silver | Bronze | Total |
|---|---|---|---|---|---|
| 1 | Austria | 3 | 2 | 2 | 7 |
| 2 | Italy | 2 | 2 | 1 | 5 |
| 3 | Norway | 2 | 0 | 0 | 2 |
| 4 | United States | 1 | 1 | 1 | 3 |
| 5 | Croatia | 1 | 0 | 1 | 2 |
| 6 | Canada* | 1 | 0 | 0 | 1 |
| 6 | France | 1 | 0 | 0 | 1 |
| 8 | Germany | 0 | 3 | 2 | 5 |
| 8 | Switzerland | 0 | 3 | 2 | 5 |
| 10 | Sweden | 0 | 1 | 1 | 2 |
| Totals (10 entries) | | 11 | 12 | 10 | 33 |
