= Magdalena Egger =

Austrian alpine skier (born 2001)

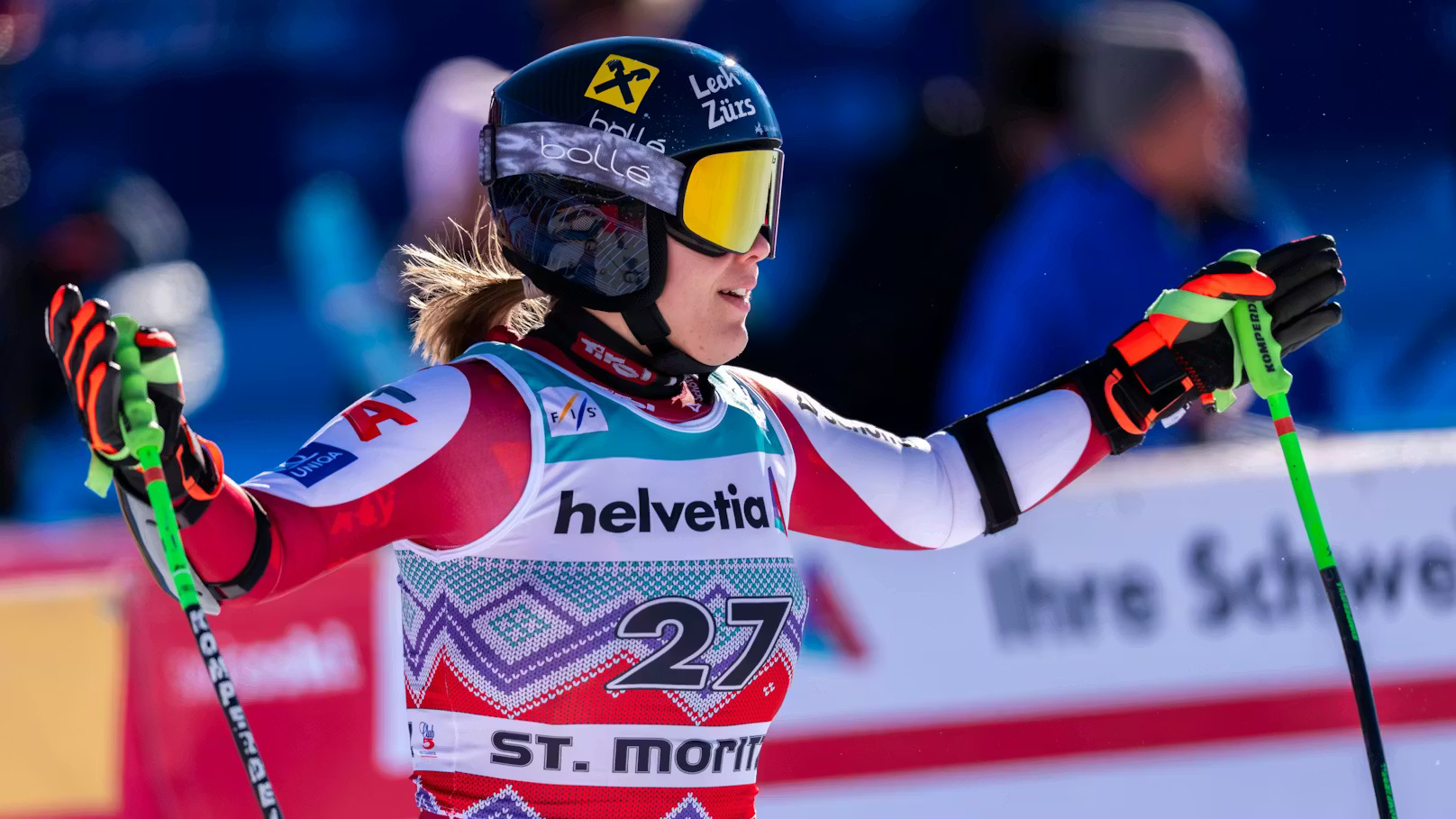
- Egger in 2025

Personal information
- Nickname: Mäggy
- Born: 22 January 2001 (age 25) Lech, Vorarlberg, Austria
- Website: magdalena-egger.at

Skiing career
- Country: Austria
- Sport: Alpine skiing
- Club: Ski Club Arlberg Lech
- Disciplines: Downhill, super-G, giant slalom, slalom
- World Cup debut: 14 January 2020 (age 19)

World Cup
- Seasons: 6 – (2020–2023, 2025–2026)
- Wins: 0
- Podiums: 1 – (1 DH)
- Overall titles: 0 – (49th in 2026)
- Discipline titles: 0 – (18th in DH, 2026)
Medal record
Women's alpine skiing
Representing Austria
Junior World Championships
Gold medal – first place	2020 Narvik	Downhill
Gold medal – first place	2020 Narvik	Super-G
Gold medal – first place	2020 Narvik	Combined
Gold medal – first place	2022 Panorama	Downhill
Gold medal – first place	2022 Panorama	Super-G
Gold medal – first place	2022 Panorama	Giant slalom
Silver medal – second place	2022 Panorama	Combined
Silver medal – second place	2022 Panorama	Team event
Bronze medal – third place	2021 Bansko	Super-G

Magdalena Egger (born 22 January 2001) is an Austrian World Cup alpine ski racer who competes in all disciplines. She holds the record for most medals won at the World Junior Alpine Skiing Championships with nine (six gold, two silver, and one bronze).

== Early life ==
Egger grew up in the winter resort town of Lech am Arlberg, Vorarlberg, with her twin brother, Christoph. She was on skis before her third birthday and started race training in grade school. She attended the Stams Ski Academy and joined the Austrian ski team in 2017 at age sixteen.

== Career ==
The Austrian Ski Association named Egger their "Rookie of the Year" after her initial 2017–18 season. The following season saw Egger's first victories at the international level, an invitation to the 2019 Junior World Championships in Val di Fassa, Italy, and winning the Austrian Junior Championship in giant slalom.

After several starts on the Europa Cup in the first half of the 2019–20 season, Egger made her World Cup debut in the night slalom in Flachau, Austria, on 14 January 2020. That March, Egger competed in all four of the women's races contested at the 2020 Junior World Championships in Narvik, Norway (the slalom was cancelled due to the COVID-19 pandemic), and won gold in the downhill, super-G, and combined.

The 2020–21 season began with Egger earning her first-ever World Cup points at the slalom in Levi, Finland. She only had two more World Cup starts that season however, with most of the season spent racing on the Europa Cup. The season was capped off with her third trip to the Junior World Championships, this time in Bansko, Bulgaria, where she took the bronze in the super-G but skied off in both the giant slalom and slalom.

Success on the World Cup circuit eluded Egger in 2021–22; she failed to qualify for a second run in any of the four events (all slalom) she entered. Her results improved at the 2022 Junior World Championships held at the Panorama Mountain Resort in British Columbia, Canada, where Egger made history as she claimed three gold medals (in downhill, super-G, and giant slalom) along with two silvers (in combined and the team parallel event) to break the record for most medals won at the Junior World Championships. The wins in Panorama earned her a spot at the World Cup finals in Courchevel and Méribel, France, but she was not able to place high enough to earn World Cup points in those races. The season concluded with the Austrian National Championships where Egger topped the field in the super-G to take the title.

Egger was again unable to earn any World Cup points in five starts in technical events to kick off the 2022–23 season, then spent the rest of that season and all of 2023–24 on the Europa Cup. On the lower tour she made the podium three times in speed events and finished the 2024 season second in the super-G standings and fourth in downhill and overall.

In her return to World Cup events for the 2024–25 season, Egger only entered races in the speed disciplines and was able to secure points in six of the thirteen races she entered.

Egger attained her first World Cup podium in December 2025 at St. Moritz, Switzerland, where she was runner-up to Lindsey Vonn in the opening downhill of the 2025–26 season. She followed that up with a seventh-place finish in another downhill in St. Moritz the next day, and by earning points in each of the subsequent three speed races that December. In January, Egger crashed during the downhill in Zauchensee, Austria, and tore the anterior cruciate ligament in her right knee, resulting in her having to sit out the rest of the season and the 2026 Winter Olympics. Egger had been ranked sixth in the downhill standings and twentieth in super-G going in to the race, and Roland Assinger, the head coach of the Austrian women's team, considered her loss to be a significant setback for the team going into the Olympics.

== World Cup results ==
=== Season standings ===
Season
Season	Age	Overall	Slalom	Giant slalom	Super-G	Downhill
2021	20	108	44	—	—	—
2022	21	no World Cup points earned				
2023	22	no World Cup points earned				
2024	23	did not compete				
2025	24	79	—	—	37	33
2026	25	49	—	—	32	18

=== Top-ten finishes ===
- 0 wins
- 1 podium – (1 DH); 2 top tens

Season
Season	Date	Location	Discipline	Place
2026	12 December 2025	St. Moritz, Switzerland	Downhill	2nd
2026	13 December 2025	St. Moritz, Switzerland	Downhill	7th
