= Joshua Sturm =

Austrian alpine ski racer

Personal information
- Born: 6 May 2001 (age 25) St. Leonhard im Pitztal, Tyrol, Austria

Skiing career
- Country: Austria
- Sport: Alpine skiing
- Club: SC St. Leonhard - St. Leonhard im Pitztal
- Disciplines: Slalom, Giant slalom
- World Cup debut: 12 December 2021 (age 20)

Olympics
- Teams: 0

World Championships
- Teams: 0

World Cup
- Seasons: 5 – (2022–2026)
- Podiums: 0
- Overall titles: 0 – (41st in 2026)
- Discipline titles: 0 – (23rd in GS, 2026)
Medal record
Men's alpine skiing
Representing Austria
International alpine ski competitions
Junior World Championships
Silver medal – second place	2022 Panorama	Team parallel
Bronze medal – third place	2021 Bansko	Slalom
European Youth Olympic Festival
Gold medal – first place	2019 Sarajevo	Slalom
Silver medal – second place	2019 Sarajevo	Mixed team
- Updated on 25 March 2026

Joshua Sturm (born 6 May 2001) is an Austrian World Cup alpine ski racer who specializes in slalom and giant slalom.

== Career ==
Sturm was born in St. Leonhard im Pitztal. He was very prominent in the youth categories of alpine skiing, winning silver and bronze medals at the Junior World Championships and winning gold and silver medals at the European Youth Olympic Festival in Sarajevo 2019, and in both events he won medals in slalom and mixed teams.

Sturm made his World Cup debut at age 20 in December 2021 at Val d'Isère. Unlike the success achieved in the youth category, the trajectory in the adult category has been discreet and marked by injuries: as on 24 September 2024, months before the start of the 2024–25 FIS Alpine Ski World Cup, when Sturm suffered a serious thigh injury, with a partial rupture of the semimembranosus muscle.

== World Cup results ==
=== Season standings ===
Season
Season	Age	Overall	Slalom	Giant slalom	Super-G	Downhill
2024	22	111	44	48	—	—
2025	23	109	41	—	—	—
2026	24	41	28	23	—	—

=== Top-ten results ===
- 0 podiums, 1 top ten

Season
Season	Date	Location	Discipline	Place
2026	24 March 2026	Hafjell, Norway	Giant slalom	7th
