= Mellau =

- Municipality
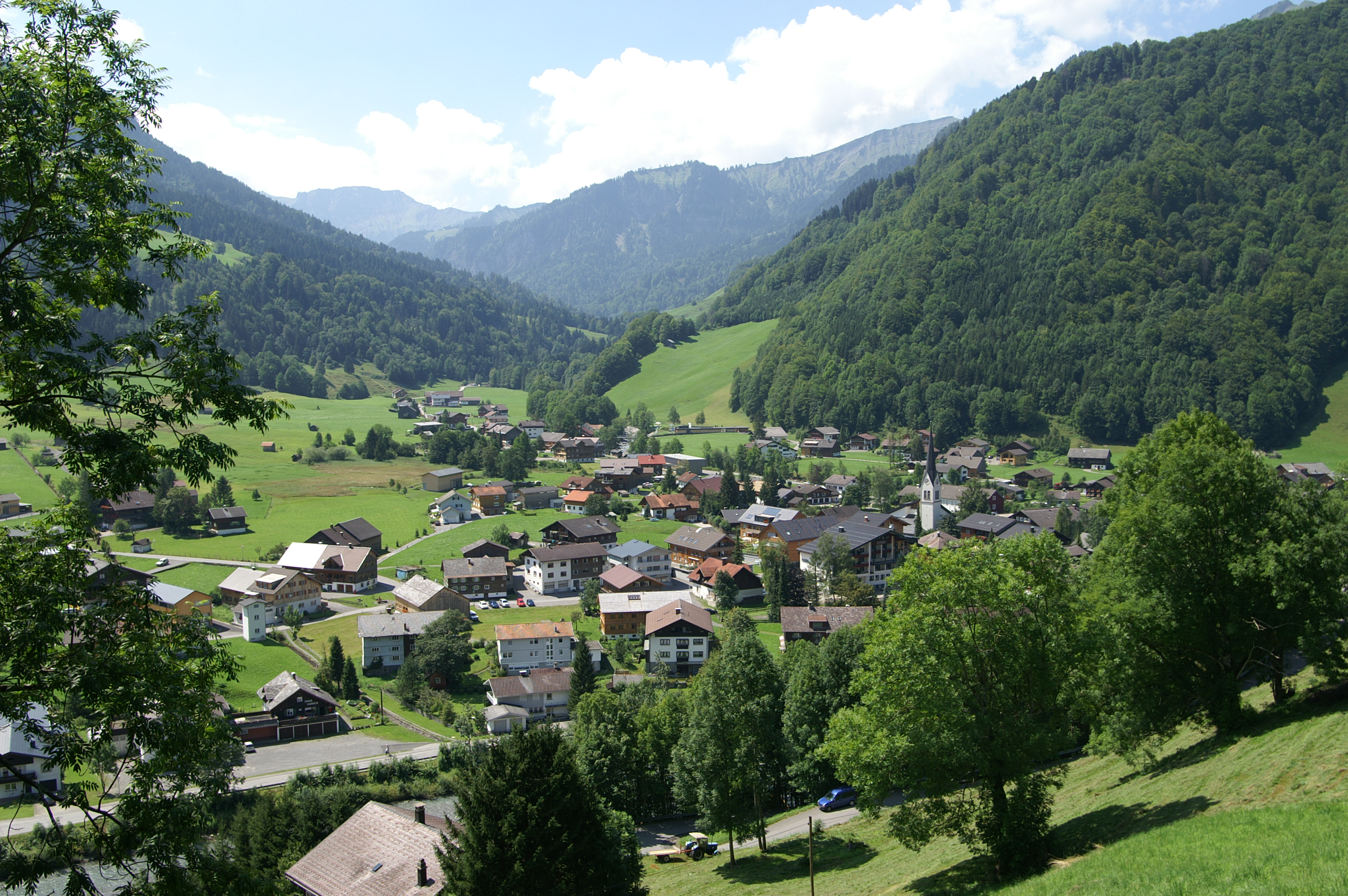

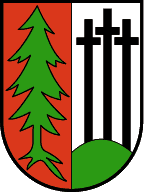
- Coat of arms

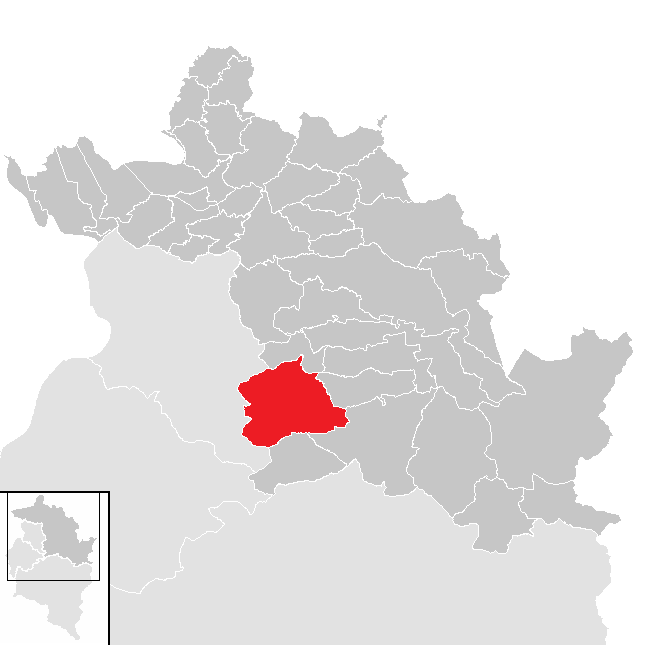
- Location in the district

- Location within Austria
- Coordinates: 47°21′04″N 09°52′55″E
- Country: Austria
- State: Vorarlberg
- District: Bregenz

Government
  - Mayor: Tobias Bischofberger

Area
  - Total: 40.55 km^{2} (15.66 sq mi)
- Elevation: 688 m (2,257 ft)

Population (2018-01-01)
  - Total: 1,301
  - Density: 32.08/km^{2} (83.10/sq mi)
- Time zone: UTC+1 (CET)
  - Summer (DST): UTC+2 (CEST)
- Postal code: 6881
- Area code: 05518
- Vehicle registration: B
- Website: www.mellau.at

Mellau is a town in the Bregenz Forest in the westernmost Austrian state of Vorarlberg, part of the district of Bregenz.

== Geography ==
Mellau covers an area of 40.55 km^{2}. Mellau lies at the foot of the Kanisfluh mountain which is considered to be the Bregenz Forest's landmark.

== History ==
From 1805 to 1814 Mellau belonged to Bavaria but then reverted to Austria. In 1870 there was a great fire in Mellau: The church, the school, the rectory and 18 other houses were razed. After the Second World War, from 1945 to 1955 the town was in the French zone of occupation.

== Population ==
The municipality has about 1300 inhabitants.

Historical population
Year	Pop.	±%
1869	650	—
1880	627	−3.5%
1890	583	−7.0%
1900	616	+5.7%
1910	620	+0.6%
1923	645	+4.0%
1934	749	+16.1%
1939	704	−6.0%
1951	871	+23.7%
1961	922	+5.9%
1971	1,058	+14.8%
1981	1,088	+2.8%
1991	1,171	+7.6%
2001	1,282	+9.5%
2011	1,308	+2.0%

== Coat of arms ==
The coat of arms was designed by the artist Hubert Dietrich in 1962. It shows an uprooted fir tree, which symbolises the affiliation to the Bregenz Forest, and three crosses, which are a remembrance of the plague.

== Tourism ==
Thanks to the merging of the two ski areas Damüls and Mellau in 2010, the largest ski area in the Bregenz Forest and one of the largest ski regions in the state of Vorarlberg was created: The ski resort area Damüls-Mellau.

In the summer and autumn of 2015, the Mellau cable car was rebuilt in the form of a monocable.

Bregenzerwald Umgang

This "Bregenz Forest Walking Tour" offers insights into the architecture and community planning of 12 traditional villages in the Bregenzerwald. While walking over various landscapes, visiting public buildings, homes and everyday objects, walkers gain a comprehensive overview of typical Bregenzerwald architectural styles as they developed throughout the ages.

== Trivia ==
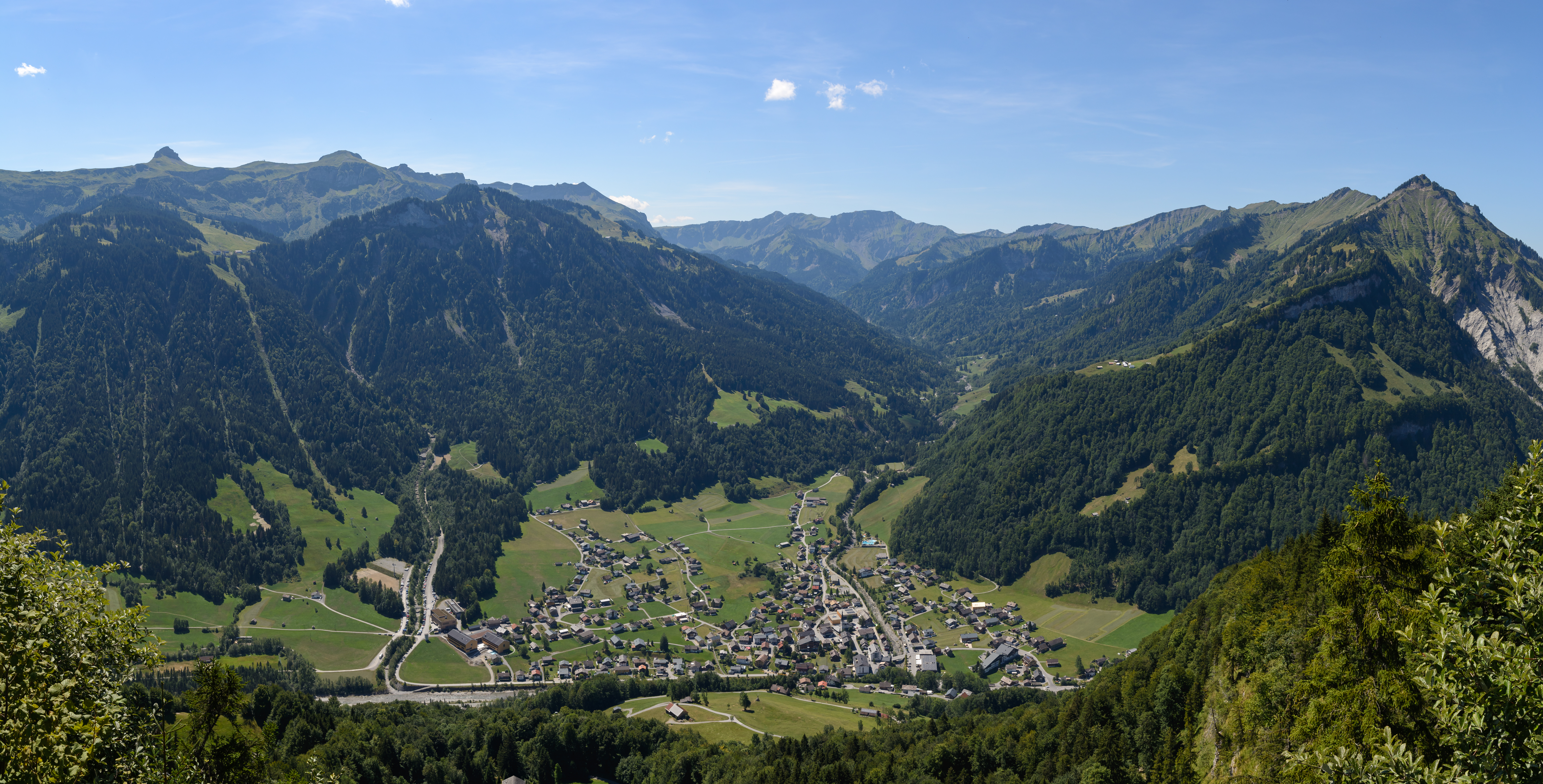
Mellau

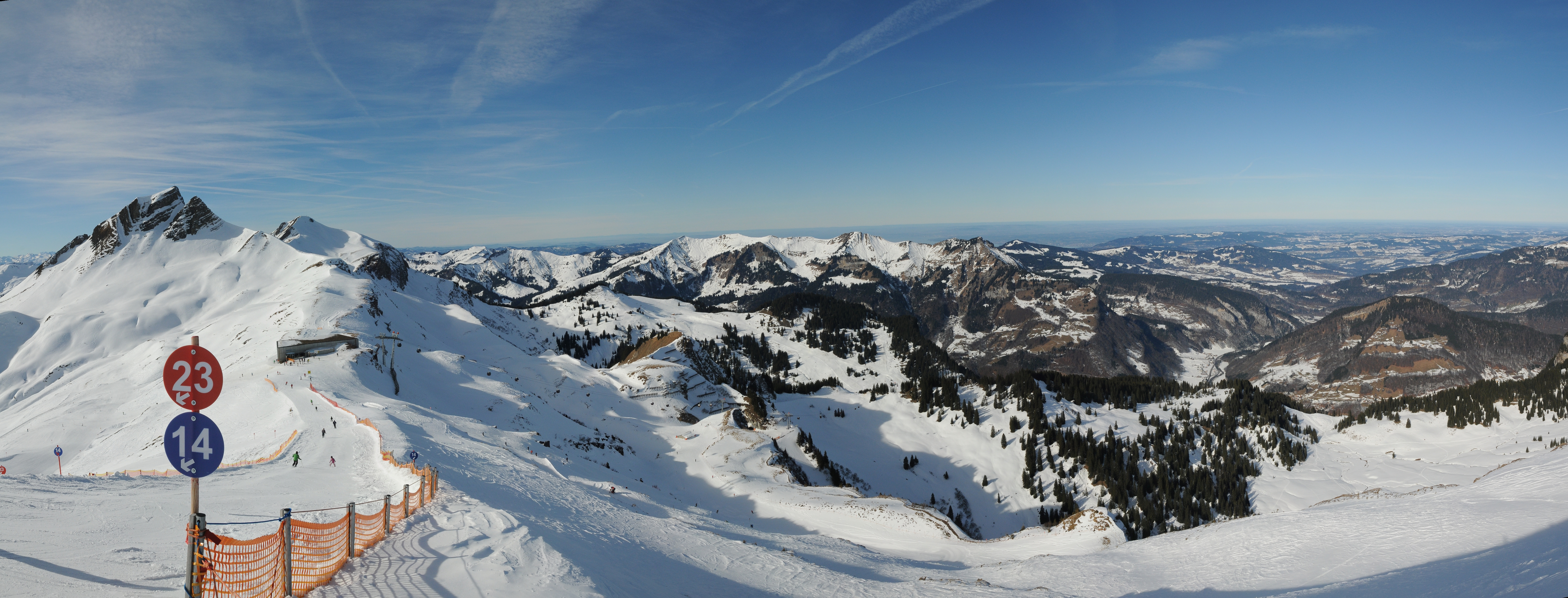
Panoramic view of the ski area Mellau-Damüls

In Austria, Mellau is known for the song "Vo Mello bis ge Schoppornou" (Alemannic for "From Mellau to Schoppernau") by the Bregenz Forest band Holstuonarmusigbigbandclub.

== See also ==
- Horizon Field

== Notable people ==
- Norbert Bischofberger (born 1954), scientist, co-developer of the influenza vaccination Tamiflu.
- Hubert Dietrich (1930-2006), painter and painting restorer.
- Hermann Rützler (1883-1960), photographer and author.
