= 2016–17 FIS Freestyle Ski World Cup =

Freestyle skiing competitive season

Freestyle Ski World Cup 2016/17
Discipline	Men	Women
Overall	(Canada) Mikaël Kingsbury (6)	(Australia) Britteny Cox
Moguls	(Canada) Mikaël Kingsbury (6)	(Australia) Britteny Cox
Aerials	(China) Qi Guangpu (2)	(China) Xu Mengtao (3)
Ski Cross	(France) Jean Frederic Chapuis (3)	(Canada) Marielle Thompson (3)
Halfpipe	(France) Kevin Rolland (3)	(France) Marie Martinod (2)
Slopestyle	(United States) McRae Williams	(Switzerland) Sarah Höfflin
Big Air	(Sweden) Henrik Harlaut	(Sweden) Emma Dahlström
FIS Super Series	(Switzerland) Kai Mahler	(Switzerland) Mathilde Gremaud
Cross Alps Tour	(France) Jean Frederic Chapuis	(Canada) Marielle Thompson
- Nations Cup: Canada (9)

Competition
Locations	32	32
Individual	45	45
Team	2	2
Cancelled	1	2
Rescheduled	1	1

The 2016/17 FIS Freestyle Ski World Cup was the thirty eighth World Cup season in freestyle skiing organised by International Ski Federation. The season started on 3 September 2016 and ended on 26 March 2017. This season included six disciplines: moguls, aerials, ski cross, halfpipe, slopestyle and big air.

== Map of world cup hosts ==
All 33 locations hosting world cup events both for men and ladies.

2016–17 FIS Freestyle Ski World Cup (Europe)	2016–17 FIS Freestyle Ski World Cup (Asia) 2016–17 FIS Freestyle Ski World Cup (North America) 2016–17 FIS Freestyle Ski World Cup (South America)

== Men ==
=== Ski Cross ===
Num	Season	Date	Place	Event	Winner	Second	Third	Ref.
119	1	9 December 2016	(France) Val Thorens	SX	(France) Jean Frederic Chapuis	(France) Sylvain Miaillier	(Sweden) Victor Öhling Norberg	
120	2	10 December 2016	(France) Val Thorens	SX	(Switzerland) Alex Fiva	(Canada) Brady Leman	(Sweden) Viktor Andersson	
121	3	13 December 2016	(Switzerland) Arosa (night)	SX	(Switzerland) Romain Détraz	(Canada) Brady Leman	(France) Jean Frederic Chapuis	
122	4	17 December 2016	(Austria) Montafon	SX	(France) Jean Frederic Chapuis	(France) Jonas Devouassoux	(Switzerland) Marc Bischofberger	
123	5	21 December 2016	(Italy) Innichen	SX	(Slovenia) Filip Flisar	(Germany) Tim Hronek	(Switzerland) Alex Fiva	
124	6	22 December 2016	(Italy) Innichen	SX	(Slovenia) Filip Flisar	(Austria) Christoph Wahrstötter	(France) Arnaud Bovolenta	
1st Cross Alps Tour Overall (9–22 December 2016)					(France) Jean Frederic Chapuis	(Slovenia) Filip Flisar	(Switzerland) Alex Fiva	
125	7	14 January 2017 (Note: Ski Cross lack of snow event for men from Megève rescheduled to Watles on 14 January 2017.)	(Italy) Watles	SX	(Switzerland) Armin Niederer	(Canada) Brady Leman	(France) Jean Frederic Chapuis	
126	8	15 January 2017	(Italy) Watles	SX	(Switzerland) Alex Fiva	(Canada) Brady Leman	(Switzerland) Armin Niederer	
		22 January 2017	(France) Megève	SX	lack of snow; rescheduled to the first event in Watles			
127	9	4 February 2017	(Germany) Feldberg	SX	(France) Jean Frederic Chapuis	(Canada) Brady Leman	(Switzerland) Alex Fiva	
128	10	5 February 2017	(Germany) Feldberg	SX	(France) Jean Frederic Chapuis	(Slovenia) Filip Flisar	(Switzerland) Alex Fiva	
129	11	11 February 2017	(Sweden) Idre	SX	(Switzerland) Alex Fiva	(Switzerland) Marc Bischofberger	(Russia) Igor Omelin	
130	12	12 February 2017	(Sweden) Idre	SX	(Canada) Brady Leman	(France) Arnaud Bovolenta	(France) Jonas Devouassoux	
131	13	25 February 2017	(Russia) Sunny Valley	SX	(France) Arnaud Bovolenta	(Germany) Tim Hronek	(Germany) Daniel Bohnacker	
132	14	5 March 2017	(Canada) Blue Mountain	SX	(Canada) Brady Leman	(Canada) Christopher Del Bosco	(Slovenia) Filip Flisar	

=== Moguls ===
Num	Season	Date	Place	Event	Winner	Second	Third	Ref.
65	1	4 February 2017	(United States) Deer Valley	DM	(Canada) Mikaël Kingsbury	(Canada) Marc-Antoine Gagnon	(Australia) Brodie Summers	
66	2	19 February 2017	(Japan) Tazawako	DM	(Canada) Mikaël Kingsbury	(France) Benjamin Cavet	(Australia) Matt Graham	
67	3	26 February 2017	(China) Thaiwoo	DM	(Canada) Mikaël Kingsbury	(Switzerland) Marco Tadé	(United States) Bradley Wilson	
317	1	10 December 2016	(Finland) Ruka	MO	(Canada) Mikaël Kingsbury	(Australia) Matt Graham	(France) Benjamin Cavet	
318	2	14 January 2017	(United States) Lake Placid	MO	(Kazakhstan) Dmitriy Reiherd	(France) Benjamin Cavet	(United States) Bradley Wilson	
319	3	22 January 2017	(Canada) Val St. Come	MO	(Canada) Mikaël Kingsbury	(France) Sacha Theocharis	(Sweden) Walter Wallberg	
320	4	28 January 2017	(Canada) Calgary	MO	(Australia) Matt Graham	(Canada) Mikaël Kingsbury	(France) Benjamin Cavet	
321	5	2 February 2017	(United States) Deer Valley	MO	(Canada) Mikaël Kingsbury	(France) Benjamin Cavet	(Canada) Philippe Marquis	
322	6	11 February 2017	(South Korea) Bogwang/Pyeongchang	MO	(Canada) Mikaël Kingsbury	(Kazakhstan) Dmitriy Reiherd	(Canada) Philippe Marquis	
323	7	18 February 2017	(Japan) Tazawako	MO	(Canada) Mikaël Kingsbury	(Canada) Philippe Marquis	(France) Benjamin Cavet	
324	8	25 February 2017	(China) Thaiwoo	MO	(Canada) Mikaël Kingsbury	(Australia) Brodie Summers	(Australia) Matt Graham	

=== Aerials ===
Num	Season	Date	Place	Event	Winner	Second	Third	Ref.
318	1	17 December 2016	(China) Beida Lake	AE	(Belarus) Anton Kushnir	(China) Qi Guangpu	(China) Zhou Hang	
319	2	18 December 2016	(China) Beida Lake	AE	(China) Qi Guangpu	(China) Liu Zhongqing	(Belarus) Maxim Gustik (China) Wang Xindi	
320	3	14 January 2017	(United States) Lake Placid	AE	(Belarus) Anton Kushnir	(United States) Mac Bohonnon	(Russia) Maxim Burov	
321	4	3 February 2017	(United States) Deer Valley	AE	(China) Qi Guangpu	(Belarus) Stanislau Hladchenko	(Russia) Stanislav Nikitin	
322	5	10 February 2017	(South Korea) Bogwang/Pyeongchang	AE	(Belarus) Anton Kushnir	(China) Qi Guangpu	(United States) Mac Bohonnon	
323	6	25 February 2017	(Belarus) Minsk	AE	(China) Wang Xindi	(China) Qi Guangpu	(China) Zhou Hang	
324	7	4 March 2017	(Russia) Moscow (night)	AE	(China) Zhou Hang	(Belarus) Maxim Gustik	(Russia) Maxim Burov	

=== Big Air ===
Num	Season	Date	Place	Event	Winner	Second	Third	Ref.
2	1	3 September 2016	(Chile) El Colorado	BA	(Sweden) Henrik Harlaut	(Switzerland) Fabian Bösch	(Switzerland) Luca Schuler	
3	2	11 November 2016	(Italy) Milan	BA	(Switzerland) Kai Mahler	(Norway) Øystein Bråten	(Norway) Eirik Sateroy	
4	3	2 December 2016	(Germany) Mönchengladbach	BA	(Sweden) Henrik Harlaut	(Switzerland) Luca Schuler	(Norway) Eirik Sateroy	
5	4	11 February 2017	(Canada) Quebec City	BA	(Switzerland) Kai Mahler	(Sweden) Henrik Harlaut	(Switzerland) Andri Ragettli	
FIS Super Series (11 November 2016 – 11 February 2017)					(Switzerland) Kai Mahler	(Sweden) Henrik Harlaut	(Switzerland) Andri Ragettli	
6	5	24 March 2017	(Norway) Myrkdalen-Voss	BA	(Norway) Christian Nummedal	(Norway) Birk Ruud	(Norway) Ferdinand Dahl	
7	6	25 March 2017	(Norway) Myrkdalen-Voss	BA	(Norway) Birk Ruud	(France) Antoine Adelisse	(Norway) Felix Stridsberg-Usterud	

=== Slopestyle ===
Num	Season	Date	Place	Event	Winner	Second	Third	Ref.
18	1	14 January 2017	(France) Font Romeu	SS	(United States) McRae Williams	(Sweden) Jesper Tjader	(Canada) Alex Bellemare	
19	2	28 January 2017	(Italy) Seiser Alm	SS	(United States) Colby Stevenson	(Switzerland) Colin Wili	(Australia) Russell Henshaw	
		5 February 2017	(United States) Mammoth Mountain	SS	cancelled due to weather conditions: high winds and driving snow			
21	3	12 February 2017	(Canada) Quebec City	SS	(Switzerland) Andri Ragettli	(United Kingdom) James Woods	(Canada) Alex Beaulieu-Marchand	
22	4	3 March 2017	(Switzerland) Silvaplana	SS	(Canada) Teal Harle	(United States) McRae Williams	(United States) Gus Kenworthy	

=== Halfpipe ===
Num	Season	Date	Place	Event	Winner	Second	Third	Ref.
34	1	17 December 2016	(United States) Copper Mountain	HP	(France) Kevin Rolland	(France) Benoit Valentin	(United States) Aaron Blunck	
35	2	4 February 2017	(United States) Mammoth Mountain	HP	(United States) Torin Yater-Wallace	(United States) Gus Kenworthy	(United States) Taylor Seaton	
36	3	18 February 2017	(South Korea) Bogwang/Pyeongchang	HP	(United States) Torin Yater-Wallace	(United States) Aaron Blunck	(France) Benoit Valentin	
37	4	7 March 2017	(France) Tignes (night)	HP	(United States) Alex Ferreira	(United States) Taylor Seaton	(France) Kevin Rolland	

== Women ==
=== Ski Cross ===
Num	Season	Date	Place	Event	Winner	Second	Third	Ref.
120	1	9 December 2016	(France) Val Thorens	SX	(Canada) Marielle Thompson	(Switzerland) Fanny Smith	(Sweden) Sandra Näslund	
121	2	10 December 2016	(France) Val Thorens	SX	(Sweden) Anna Holmlund	(Sweden) Sandra Näslund	(Germany) Daniela Maier	
122	3	13 December 2016	(Switzerland) Arosa (night)	SX	(Canada) Marielle Thompson	(Poland) Karolina Riemen	(France) Ophélie David	
123	4	17 December 2016	(Austria) Montafon	SX	(Canada) Marielle Thompson	(France) Marielle Berger-Sabbatel	(Germany) Heidi Zacher	
124	5	21 December 2016	(Italy) Innichen	SX	(Germany) Heidi Zacher	(Canada) Marielle Thompson	(Canada) Georgia Simmerling	
125	6	22 December 2016	(Italy) Innichen	SX	(Germany) Heidi Zacher	(Switzerland) Fanny Smith	(France) Marielle Berger-Sabbatel	
1st Cross Alps Tour Overall (9–22 December 2016)					(Canada) Marielle Thompson	(Germany) Heidi Zacher	(Switzerland) Fanny Smith	
126	7	14 January 2017 (Note: Ski Cross lack of snow event for ladies from Megève is rescheduled to Watles on 14 January 2017.)	(Italy) Watles	SX	(Sweden) Sandra Näslund	(Canada) Georgia Simmerling	(Germany) Heidi Zacher	
127	8	15 January 2017	(Italy) Watles	SX	(Canada) Marielle Thompson	(Switzerland) Fanny Smith	(France) Marielle Berger-Sabbatel	
		22 January 2017	(France) Megève	SX	lack of snow; rescheduled to the first event in Watles			
128	9	4 February 2017	(Germany) Feldberg	SX	(Germany) Heidi Zacher	(Switzerland) Fanny Smith	(Sweden) Sandra Näslund	
		5 February 2017	(Germany) Feldberg	SX	cancelled due to heavy snow			
130	10	11 February 2017	(Sweden) Idre	SX	(Sweden) Sandra Näslund	(Australia) Sami Kennedy-Sim	(Austria) Katrin Ofner	
131	11	12 February 2017	(Sweden) Idre	SX	(Canada) Marielle Thompson	(Sweden) Sandra Näslund	(Switzerland) Fanny Smith	
132	12	25 February 2017	(Russia) Sunny Valley	SX	(Canada) Marielle Thompson	(Sweden) Sandra Näslund	(France) Ophélie David	
133	13	5 March 2017	(Canada) Blue Mountain	SX	(Canada) Marielle Thompson	(Sweden) Sandra Näslund	(Switzerland) Fanny Smith	

=== Moguls ===
Num	Season	Date	Place	Event	Winner	Second	Third	Ref.
64	1	4 February 2017	(United States) Deer Valley	DM	(Australia) Britteny Cox	(Canada) Andi Naude	(United States) Jaelin Kauf	
65	2	19 February 2017	(Japan) Tazawako	DM	(United States) Jaelin Kauf	(Kazakhstan) Yuliya Galysheva	(United States) Olivia Giaccio	
66	3	26 February 2017	(China) Thaiwoo	DM	(Australia) Britteny Cox	(France) Perrine Laffont	(Canada) Justine Dufour-Lapointe	
318	1	10 December 2016	(Finland) Ruka	MO	(Australia) Britteny Cox	(France) Perrine Laffont	(United States) Keaton McCargo	
319	2	13 January 2017	(United States) Lake Placid	MO	(Australia) Britteny Cox	(France) Perrine Laffont	(United States) Morgan Schild	
320	3	21 January 2017	(Canada) Val St. Come	MO	(Canada) Justine Dufour-Lapointe	(Canada) Andi Naude	(Canada) Chloe Dufour-Lapointe	
321	4	28 January 2017	(Canada) Calgary	MO	(Australia) Britteny Cox	(Canada) Justine Dufour-Lapointe	(Canada) Chloe Dufour-Lapointe	
322	5	2 February 2017	(United States) Deer Valley	MO	(United States) Morgan Schild	(Canada) Justine Dufour-Lapointe	(Australia) Britteny Cox	
323	6	11 February 2017	(South Korea) Bogwang/Pyeongchang	MO	(Australia) Britteny Cox	(Canada) Justine Dufour-Lapointe	(Canada) Andi Naude	
324	7	18 February 2017	(Japan) Tazawako	MO	(Australia) Britteny Cox	(France) Perrine Laffont	(Canada) Andi Naude	
325	8	25 February 2017	(China) Thaiwoo	MO	(France) Perrine Laffont	(Canada) Justine Dufour-Lapointe	(Australia) Britteny Cox	

=== Aerials ===
Num	Season	Date	Place	Event	Winner	Second	Third	Ref.
321	1	17 December 2016	(China) Beida Lake	AE	(China) Xu Mengtao	(Australia) Danielle Scott	(Russia) Liubov Nikitina	
322	2	18 December 2016	(China) Beida Lake	AE	(Australia) Danielle Scott	(China) Xu Mengtao	(Australia) Samantha Wells	
323	3	14 January 2017	(United States) Lake Placid	AE	(United States) Ashley Caldwell	(Australia) Danielle Scott	(Russia) Kristina Spiridonova	
324	4	3 February 2017	(United States) Deer Valley	AE	(Australia) Lydia Lassila	(United States) Kiley McKinnon	(China) Xu Mengtao	
325	5	10 February 2017	(South Korea) Bogwang/Pyeongchang	AE	(China) Xu Mengtao	(China) Shen Xiaoxue	(China) Yang Yu	
326	6	25 February 2017	(Belarus) Minsk	AE	(Australia) Lydia Lassila	(Australia) Danielle Scott	(China) Xu Mengtao	
327	7	4 March 2017	(Russia) Moscow	AE	(Australia) Lydia Lassila	(China) Xu Mengtao	(Australia) Laura Peel	

=== Big Air ===
Num	Season	Date	Place	Event	Winner	Second	Third	Ref.
2	1	3 September 2016	(Chile) El Colorado	BA	(Sweden) Emma Dahlström	(Switzerland) Giulia Tanno	(Chile) Melanie Kraizel	
3	2	11 November 2016	(Italy) Milan	BA	(Germany) Lisa Zimmermann	(Switzerland) Mathilde Gremaud	(Sweden) Emma Dahlström	
4	3	2 December 2016	(Germany) Mönchengladbach	BA	(Italy) Silvia Bertagna	(Sweden) Emma Dahlström	(Germany) Lisa Zimmermann	
5	4	11 February 2017	(Canada) Quebec City	BA	(Switzerland) Mathilde Gremaud	(Switzerland) Giulia Tanno	(Switzerland) Sarah Höfflin	
FIS Super Series (11 November 2016 – 11 February 2017)					(Switzerland) Mathilde Gremaud	(Italy) Silvia Bertagna	(Germany) Lisa Zimmermann	
6	5	24 March 2017	(Norway) Myrkdalen-Voss	BA	(Sweden) Emma Dahlström	(Italy) Silvia Bertagna	(Norway) Tora Johansen	
7	6	25 March 2017	(Norway) Myrkdalen-Voss	BA	(Sweden) Emma Dahlström	(Italy) Silvia Bertagna	(Germany) Kea Kühnel	

=== Slopestyle ===
Num	Season	Date	Place	Event	Winner	Second	Third	Ref.
18	1	14 January 2017	(France) Font Romeu	SS	(France) Tess Ledeux	(Norway) Johanne Killi	(Canada) Anouk Purnelle-Faniel	
19	2	28 January 2017	(Italy) Seiser Alm	SS	(Switzerland) Sarah Höfflin	(France) Coline Ballet Baz	(United States) Caroline Claire	
20	3	5 February 2017	(United States) Mammoth Mountain	SS	(United States) Maggie Voisin	(Switzerland) Mathilde Gremaud	(Norway) Johanne Killi	
21	4	12 February 2017	(Canada) Quebec City	SS	(Norway) Johanne Killi	(Switzerland) Sarah Höfflin	(Switzerland) Giulia Tanno	
22	5	3 March 2017	(Switzerland) Silvaplana	SS	(United Kingdom) Isabel Atkin	(Sweden) Emma Dahlström	(Switzerland) Mathilde Gremaud	

=== Halfpipe ===
Num	Season	Date	Place	Event	Winner	Second	Third	Ref.
34	1	17 December 2016	(United States) Copper Mountain	HP	(France) Marie Martinod	(United States) Annalisa Drew	(United States) Devin Logan	
35	2	4 February 2017	(United States) Mammoth Mountain	HP	(France) Marie Martinod	(United States) Maddie Bowman	(Japan) Ayana Onozuka	
36	3	18 February 2017	(South Korea) Bogwang/Pyeongchang	HP	(France) Marie Martinod	(United States) Devin Logan	(Japan) Ayana Onozuka	
37	4	7 March 2017	(France) Tignes (night)	HP	(Canada) Cassie Sharpe	(Japan) Ayana Onozuka	(France) Marie Martinod	

== Team ==
Num	Season	Date	Place	Event	Winner	Second	Third	Ref.
4	1	18 December 2016	(China) Beida Lake	AET	Russia Alexandra Orlova; Liubov Nikitina; Maxim Burov	Canada Catrine Lavallee; Travis Gerrits; Lewis Irving	Australia Samantha Wells; Danielle Scott; David Morris	

== Men's standings ==
=== Overall ===
Rank		Points
1	(Canada) Mikaël Kingsbury	92.73
2	(Sweden) Henrik Harlaut	65.67
3	(China) Qi Guangpu	62.86
4	(France) Jean Frederic Chapuis	54.50
5	(France) Benjamin Cavet	52.18

- Standings after 46 races.

=== Ski Cross ===
Rank		Points
1	(France) Jean Frederic Chapuis	763
2	(Canada) Brady Leman	721
3	(Switzerland) Alex Fiva	639
4	(Slovenia) Filip Flisar	525
5	(Switzerland) Armin Niederer	489

- Standings after 14 races.

=== Moguls ===
Rank		Points
1	(Canada) Mikaël Kingsbury	1020
2	(France) Benjamin Cavet	574
3	(Australia) Matt Graham	554
4	(Canada) Philippe Marquis	499
5	(Kazakhstan) Dmitriy Reiherd	372

- Standings after 11 races.

=== Aerials ===
Rank		Points
1	(China) Qi Guangpu	440
2	(United States) Mac Bohonnon	328
3	(Belarus) Anton Kushnir	308
4	(China) Zhou Hang	296
5	(Belarus) Maxim Gustik	275

- Standings after 7 events.

=== Big Air ===
Rank		Points
1	(Sweden) Henrik Harlaut	394
2	(Norway) Birk Ruud	251
3	(Norway) Øystein Bråten	242
4	(Switzerland) Kai Mahler	240
5	(Norway) Christian Nummedal	229

- Standings after 6 races.

=== Slopestyle ===
Rank		Points
1	(United States) McRae Williams	180
2	(Switzerland) Andri Ragettli	172
3	(Switzerland) Colin Wili	144
4	(Sweden) Jesper Tjader	136
5	(Canada) Teal Harle	135

- Standings after 4 races.

=== Halfpipe ===
Rank		Points
1	(France) Kevin Rolland	239
2	(France) Benoit Valentin	235
3	(United States) Aaron Blunck	219
4	(United States) Torin Yater-Wallace	218
5	(United States) Taylor Seaton	182

- Standings after 4 races.

=== Cross Alps Tour ===
Rank		Points
1	(France) Jean Frederic Chapuis	359
2	(Slovenia) Filip Flisar	282
3	(Switzerland) Alex Fiva	255
4	(Canada) Brady Leman	247
5	(Switzerland) Marc Bischofberger	220

- Standings after 6 races.

=== FIS Super Series ===
Rank		Points
1	(Switzerland) Kai Mahler	216
2	(Sweden) Henrik Harlaut	209
3	(Switzerland) Andri Ragettli	155
4	(Norway) Øystein Bråten	152
5	(Norway) Eirik Sateroy	125

- Standings after 3 races.

== Women's standings ==
=== Overall ===
Rank		Points
1	(Australia) Britteny Cox	81.27
2	(Sweden) Emma Dahlström	75.50
3	(Canada) Marielle Thompson	74.23
4	(France) Marie Martinod	72.00
5	(China) Xu Mengtao	68.57

- Standings after 46 races.

=== Ski Cross ===
Rank		Points
1	(Canada) Marielle Thompson	965
2	(Sweden) Sandra Näslund	790
3	(Switzerland) Fanny Smith	683
4	(Germany) Heidi Zacher	656
5	(France) Ophelie David	469

- Standings after 13 races.

=== Moguls ===
Rank		Points
1	(Australia) Britteny Cox	894
2	(France) Perrine Laffont	655
3	(Canada) Justine Dufour-Lapointe	596
4	(Canada) Andi Naude	470
5	(Canada) Chloe Dufour-Lapointe	440

- Standings after 11 races.

=== Aerials ===
Rank		Points
1	(China) Xu Mengtao	480
2	(Australia) Danielle Scott	447
3	(Australia) Lydia Lassila	354
4	(China) Shen Xiaoxue	240
5	(Russia) Liubov Nikitina	240

- Standings after 7 events.

=== Big Air ===
Rank		Points
1	(Sweden) Emma Dahlström	453
2	(Italy) Silvia Bertagna	360
3	(Switzerland) Mathilde Gremaud	225
4	(Switzerland) Giulia Tanno	186
5	(Germany) Kea Kühnel	166

- Standings after 6 races.

=== Slopestyle ===
Rank		Points
1	(Switzerland) Sarah Höfflin	281
2	(Norway) Johanne Killi	280
3	(France) Coline Ballet Baz	196
4	(United Kingdom) Isabel Atkin	182
5	(Sweden) Emma Dahlström	176

- Standings after 5 races.

=== Halfpipe ===
Rank		Points
1	(France) Marie Martinod	360
2	(Japan) Ayana Onozuka	250
3	(United States) Annalisa Drew	225
4	(Canada) Cassie Sharpe	185
5	(United States) Maddie Bowman	156

- Standings after 4 races.

=== Cross Alps Tour ===
Rank		Points
1	(Canada) Marielle Thompson	475
2	(Germany) Heidi Zacher	324
3	(Switzerland) Fanny Smith	293
4	(Germany) Daniela Maier	256
5	(Sweden) Sandra Näslund	240

- Standings after 6 races.

=== FIS Super Series ===
Rank		Points
1	(Switzerland) Mathilde Gremaud	225
2	(Italy) Silvia Bertagna	200
3	(Germany) Lisa Zimmermann	160
4	(Sweden) Emma Dahlström	153
5	(Switzerland) Sarah Höfflin	146

- Standings after 3 races.

== Nations Cup ==
=== Overall ===
Rank		Points
1	Canada	7697
2	France	5757
3	United States	5300
4	Switzerland	4865
5	Australia	3517

- Standings after 92 events.

=== Men's overall ===
Rank		Points
1	Canada	4101
2	France	3248
3	Switzerland	3031
4	United States	2588
5	Sweden	1636

- Standings after 46 events.

=== Ladies' overall ===
Rank		Points
1	Canada	3596
2	United States	2712
3	France	2509
4	Australia	2381
5	Switzerland	1834

- Standings after 46 events.

=== Ski Cross ===
Rank		Points
1	Canada	2888
2	France	2451
3	Switzerland	2178
4	Sweden	1659
5	Germany	1582

- Standings after 27 events.

=== Moguls ===
Rank		Points
1	Canada	2872
2	Australia	1969
3	United States	1812
4	France	1544
5	Russia	652

- Standings after 22 events.

=== Aerials ===
Rank		Points
1	China	1690
2	United States	1116
3	Australia	1063
4	Belarus	1052
5	Russia	1010

- Standings after 14 events.

=== Big Air ===
Rank		Points
1	Switzerland	1046
2	Sweden	1010
3	Norway	835
4	Italy	519
5	Germany	462

- Standings after 12 events.

=== Slopestyle ===
Rank		Points
1	Switzerland	861
2	United States	796
3	Canada	646
4	Great Britain	517
5	Norway	492

- Standings after 9 events.

=== Halfpipe ===
Rank		Points
1	United States	1135
2	France	904
3	Canada	576
4	Japan	344
5	New Zealand	338

- Standings after 8 events.

=== Cross Alps Tour Overall ===
Rank		Points
1	Canada	1270
2	France	1080
3	Switzerland	923
4	Sweden	792
5	Germany	781

- Standings after 12 events.

=== Men's Cross Alps Tour ===
Rank		Points
1	France	667
2	Switzerland	608
3	Canada	547
4	Austria	318
5	Sweden	317

- Standings after 6 events.

=== Ladies' Cross Alps Tour ===
Rank		Points
1	Canada	723
2	Germany	580
3	Sweden	475
4	France	413
5	Switzerland	315

- Standings after 6 events.
