= 2015–16 FIS Freestyle Skiing World Cup =

Freestyle skiing competitive season

Freestyle Skiing World Cup 2015/16
Discipline	Men	Women
Overall	(Canada) Mikaël Kingsbury (5)	(United States) Devin Logan
Moguls	(Canada) Mikaël Kingsbury (5)	(Canada) Chloé Dufour-Lapointe
Aerials	(Ukraine) Oleksandr Abramenko	(United States) Ashley Caldwell
Ski Cross	(France) Jean-Frédéric Chapuis (2)	(Sweden) Anna Holmlund (3)
Halfpipe	(France) Kevin Rolland (2)	(Japan) Ayana Onozuka (2)
Slopestyle/Big Air	(Switzerland) Andri Ragettli	(Norway) Tiril Sjåstad Christiansen
- Nations Cup: Canada (8)

Competition
Locations	28	28
Individual	35	35
Team	2	2
Cancelled	11	11

The 2015/16 FIS Freestyle Skiing World Cup was the thirty seventh World Cup season in freestyle skiing organised by International Ski Federation. The season started on 23 August 2015 and ended on 19 March 2016. This season included six disciplines: moguls, aerials, ski cross, halfpipe, slopestyle and big air.

== Men ==
=== Ski Cross ===
Num	Season	Date	Place	Event	Winner	Second	Third	Ref.
107	1	5 December 2015	(Austria) Montafon	SX	(Canada) Christopher Delbosco	(Canada) Brady Leman	(Slovenia) Filip Flisar	
108	2	11 December 2015	(France) Val Thorens	SX	(Canada) Christopher Delbosco	(Slovenia) Filip Flisar	(Canada) Brady Leman	
109	3	12 December 2015	(France) Val Thorens	SX	(France) Jean-Frédéric Chapuis	(Austria) Thomas Harasser	(Canada) Christopher Delbosco	
110	4	19 December 2015	(Italy) Innichen	SX	(France) Jean-Frédéric Chapuis	(Canada) Brady Leman	(Austria) Johannes Rohrweck	
111	5	20 December 2015	(Italy) Innichen	SX	(Sweden) Victor Öhling Norberg	(France) Jean-Frédéric Chapuis	(France) Sylvain Miaillier	
		16 January 2016	(France) La Plagne	SX	lack of snow; rescheduled to Watles			
112	6	16 January 2016	(Italy) Watles	SX	(France) Jean-Frédéric Chapuis	(France) Sylvain Miaillier	(France) Jonas Devouassoux	
113	7	17 January 2016 (Note: Ski Cross event for men from La Plagne rescheduled to Watles on 17 January.)	(Italy) Watles	SX	(Switzerland) Jonas Lenherr	(Switzerland) Alex Fiva	(Canada) Brady Leman	
114	8	23 January 2016	(Canada) Nakiska	SX	(France) Jean-Frédéric Chapuis	(Switzerland) Armin Niederer	(Canada) Brady Leman	
		6 February 2016	(Switzerland) Arosa	SX	lack of snow; postponed to March			
115	9	13 February 2016	(Sweden) Idre	SX	(Slovenia) Filip Flisar	(Canada) Christopher Delbosco	(Austria) Christoph Wahrstötter	
116	10	14 February 2016	(Sweden) Idre	SX	(Sweden) Victor Öhling Norberg	(Austria) Thomas Zangerl	(Switzerland) Jonas Lenherr	
		20 February 2016	(Germany) Tegernsee	SX	warm weather			
		21 February 2016	(Germany) Tegernsee	SX	warm weather			
117	11	28 February 2016	(South Korea) Bokwang/Pyeongchang	SX	(France) Bastien Midol	(Germany) Paul Eckert	(France) Jean-Frédéric Chapuis	
118	12	4 March 2016 (Note: Ski Cross event for men from Arosa postponed from 6 February to 4 March.)	(Switzerland) Arosa	SX	(Russia) Semen Denshchikov	(Sweden) Victor Öhling Norberg	(Canada) Christopher Delbosco	
		13 March 2016	(United States) Squaw Valley	SX	cancelled in January			
		19 March 2016	(Canada) Blue Mountain	SX	cancelled			

=== Moguls ===
Num	Season	Date	Place	Event	Winner	Second	Third	Ref.
61	1	12 December 2015	(Finland) Ruka	DM	(Canada) Mikaël Kingsbury	(France) Benjamin Cavet	(Japan) Ikuma Horishima	
62	2	6 February 2016	(United States) Deer Valley	DM	(France) Anthony Benna	(Finland) Jimi Salonen	(Kazakhstan) Dmitriy Reiherd	
63	3	28 February 2016	(Japan) Tazawako	DM	(Canada) Mikaël Kingsbury	(United States) Thomas Rowley	(France) Benjamin Cavet	
64	4	5 March 2016	(Russia) Moscow	DM	(Canada) Mikaël Kingsbury	(France) Benjamin Cavet	(Canada) Philippe Marquis	
		14 January 2016	(United States) Lake Placid	MO	lack of snow			
313	1	23 January 2016	(Canada) Val St. Come	MO	(Canada) Mikaël Kingsbury	(Australia) Matt Graham	(Canada) Laurent Dumais	
314	2	30 January 2016	(Canada) Calgary	MO	(Canada) Mikaël Kingsbury	(Canada) Philippe Marquis	(Japan) Sho Endo	
315	3	4 February 2016	(United States) Deer Valley	MO	(Australia) Matt Graham	(Canada) Mikaël Kingsbury	(Sweden) Ludvig Fjällström	
316	4	27 February 2016	(Japan) Tazawako	MO	(United States) Bradley Wilson	(Canada) Mikaël Kingsbury	(Australia) Matt Graham	

=== Aerials ===
Num	Season	Date	Place	Event	Winner	Second	Third	Ref.
312	1	19 December 2015	(China) Beijing	AE	(China) Qi Guangpu	(Russia) Petr Medulich	(Australia) David Morris	
313	2	20 December 2015	(China) Beijing	AE	(Belarus) Maxim Gustik	(Australia) David Morris	(Ukraine) Oleksandr Abramenko	
		15 January 2016	(United States) Lake Placid	AE	lack of snow; rescheduled to Deer Valley			
		16 January 2016	(United States) Lake Placid	AE	lack of snow; rescheduled to Deer Valley			
314	3	4 February 2016 (Note: One aerial event for men cancelled on 15/16 January in Lake Placid was rescheduled to Deer Valley on 4 February.)	(United States) Deer Valley	AE	(China) Qi Guangpu	(Canada) Olivier Rochon	(Ukraine) Oleksandr Abramenko	
315	4	5 February 2016	(United States) Deer Valley	AE	(Russia) Petr Medulich	(Ukraine) Oleksandr Abramenko	(Japan) Naoya Tabara	
316	5	13 February 2016	(Russia) Moscow	AE	(United States) Mac Bohonnon	(United States) Jonathon Lillis	(Russia) Ilya Burov	
317	6	20 February 2016	(Belarus) Minsk	AE	(United States) Christopher Lillis	(Belarus) Maxim Gustik	(Russia) Ilya Burov	
		27 February 2016	(Spain) Sierra Nevada	AE	cancelled			

=== Slopestyle/Big Air ===
Num	Season	Date	Place	Event	Winner	Second	Third	Ref.
14	1	28 August 2015 (Note: Slopestyle event in Cardrona rescheduled from 29 to 28 August.)	(New Zealand) Cardrona	SS	(United Kingdom) James Woods	(Norway) Øystein Bråten	(United States) Joss Christensen	
15	2	24 January 2016	(United States) Mammoth Mountain	SS	(United States) Joss Christensen	(United States) McRae Williams	(Norway) Øystein Bråten	
		6 February 2016	(United States) Park City	SS	cancelled			
16	3	21 February 2016	(South Korea) Bokwang/Pyeongchang	SS	(Canada) Alex Bellemare	(Sweden) Henrik Harlaut	(New Zealand) Jossi Wells	
17	4	5 March 2016	(Switzerland) Silvaplana	SS	(Switzerland) Andri Ragettli	(Switzerland) Fabian Boesch	(Norway) Øystein Bråten	
1	1	12 February 2016	(United States) Boston	BA	(Canada) Vincent Gagnier	(Switzerland) Andri Ragettli	(Switzerland) Jonas Hunziker	

=== Halfpipe ===
Num	Season	Date	Place	Event	Winner	Second	Third	Ref.
30	1	23 August 2015	(New Zealand) Cardrona	HP	(France) Kevin Rolland	(France) Thomas Krief	(France) Benoît Valentin	
31	2	23 January 2016	(United States) Mammoth Mountain	HP	(United States) Gus Kenworthy	(United States) David Wise	(United States) Aaron Blunck	
32	3	5 February 2016	(United States) Park City	HP	(United States) Aaron Blunck	(France) Benoît Valentin	(France) Kevin Rolland	
33	4	10 March 2016	(France) Tignes	HP	(France) Kevin Rolland	(United States) Lyman Currier	(France) Benoît Valentin	

== Ladies ==
=== Ski Cross ===
Num	Season	Date	Place	Event	Winner	Second	Third	Ref.
108	1	5 December 2015	(Austria) Montafon	SX	(Canada) Marielle Thompson	(Sweden) Anna Holmlund	(Austria) Katrin Ofner	
109	2	11 December 2015	(France) Val Thorens	SX	(Sweden) Anna Holmlund	(Sweden) Sandra Näslund	(France) Ophélie David	
110	3	12 December 2015	(France) Val Thorens	SX	(Sweden) Anna Holmlund	(France) Alizée Baron	(Austria) Andrea Limbacher	
111	4	19 December 2015	(Italy) Innichen	SX	(Germany) Heidi Zacher	(Sweden) Anna Holmlund	(Sweden) Sandra Näslund	
112	5	20 December 2015	(Italy) Innichen	SX	(Austria) Andrea Limbacher	(Canada) Kelsey Serwa	(France) Alizée Baron	
		16 January 2016	(France) La Plagne	SX	lack of snow; rescheduled to Watles			
113	6	16 January 2016	(Italy) Watles	SX	(Sweden) Anna Holmlund	(France) Alizée Baron	(Austria) Andrea Limbacher	
114	7	17 January 2016 (Note: Ski Cross event for ladies from La Plagne rescheduled to Watles on 17 January.)	(Italy) Watles	SX	(Canada) Marielle Thompson	(Sweden) Anna Holmlund	(Germany) Heidi Zacher	
115	8	23 January 2016	(Canada) Nakiska	SX	(Canada) Marielle Thompson	(Sweden) Anna Holmlund	(Austria) Andrea Limbacher	
		6 February 2016	(Switzerland) Arosa	SX	lack of snow; postponed to March			
116	9	13 February 2016	(Sweden) Idre	SX	(Sweden) Anna Holmlund	(Canada) Marielle Thompson	(Sweden) Sandra Näslund	
117	10	14 February 2016	(Sweden) Idre	SX	(Canada) Marielle Thompson	(Sweden) Sandra Näslund	(France) Alizée Baron	
		20 February 2016	(Germany) Tegernsee	SX	warm weather			
		21 February 2016	(Germany) Tegernsee	SX	warm weather			
118	11	28 February 2016	(South Korea) Bokwang/Pyeongchang	SX	(Austria) Andrea Limbacher	(Canada) Kelsey Serwa	(Sweden) Anna Holmlund	
119	12	4 March 2016 (Note: Ski Cross event for ladies from Arosa postponed from 6 February to 4 March.)	(Switzerland) Arosa	SX	(Sweden) Anna Holmlund	(Canada) Marielle Thompson	(France) Alizée Baron	
		13 March 2016	(United States) Squaw Valley	SX	cancelled in January			
		19 March 2016	(Canada) Blue Mountain	SX	cancelled			

=== Moguls ===
Num	Season	Date	Place	Event	Winner	Second	Third	Ref.
60	1	12 December 2015	(Finland) Ruka	DM	(United States) Mikaela Matthews	(Russia) Regina Rakhimova	(Canada) Chloé Dufour-Lapointe	
61	2	6 February 2016	(United States) Deer Valley	DM	(Canada) Justine Dufour-Lapointe	(Kazakhstan) Yuliya Galysheva	(United States) Jaelin Kauf	
62	3	28 February 2016	(Japan) Tazawako	DM	(Switzerland) Deborah Scanzio	(Canada) Audrey Robichaud	(Canada) Chloé Dufour-Lapointe	
63	4	5 March 2016	(Russia) Moscow	DM	(France) Perrine Laffont	(Canada) Andi Naude	(Norway) Wessel Hedvig	
		14 January 2016	(United States) Lake Placid	MO	lack of snow			
314	1	23 January 2016	(Canada) Val St. Come	MO	(Canada) Justine Dufour-Lapointe	(Canada) Chloé Dufour-Lapointe	(Canada) Maxime Dufour-Lapointe	
315	2	30 January 2016	(Canada) Calgary	MO	(Canada) Chloé Dufour-Lapointe	(Canada) Justine Dufour-Lapointe	(Canada) Andi Naude	
316	3	4 February 2016	(United States) Deer Valley	MO	(Canada) Justine Dufour-Lapointe	(Kazakhstan) Yuliya Galysheva	(Canada) Chloé Dufour-Lapointe	
317	4	27 February 2016	(Japan) Tazawako	MO	(France) Perrine Laffont	(Canada) Chloé Dufour-Lapointe	(Canada) Audrey Robichaud	

=== Aerials ===
Num	Season	Date	Place	Event	Winner	Second	Third	Ref.
315	1	19 December 2015	(China) Beijing	AE	(United States) Ashley Caldwell	(China) Zhang Xin	(United States) Kiley McKinnon	
316	2	20 December 2015	(China) Beijing	AE	(China) Fanyu Kong	(United States) Ashley Caldwell	(China) Huilin Quan	
		15 January 2016	(United States) Lake Placid	AE	lack of snow; rescheduled to Deer Valley			
		16 January 2016	(United States) Lake Placid	AE	lack of snow; rescheduled to Deer Valley			
317	3	4 February 2016 (Note: One aerial event for ladies cancelled on 15/16 January in Lake Placid was rescheduled to Deer Valley on 4 February.)	(United States) Deer Valley	AE	(China) Yu Yang	(Australia) Samantha Wells	(Russia) Alexandra Orlova	
318	4	5 February 2016	(United States) Deer Valley	AE	(China) Zhang Xin	(Australia) Danielle Scott	(United States) Ashley Caldwell	
319	5	13 February 2016	(Russia) Moscow	AE	(Russia) Alina Gridneva	(Kazakhstan) Zhanbota Aldabergenova	(United States) Madison Olsen	
320	6	20 February 2016	(Belarus) Minsk	AE	(United States) Ashley Caldwell	(Australia) Danielle Scott	(Belarus) Aliaksandra Ramanouskaya	
		27 February 2016	(Spain) Sierra Nevada	AE	cancelled			

=== Slopestyle/Big Air ===
Num	Season	Date	Place	Event	Winner	Second	Third	Ref.
14	1	28 August 2015 (Note: Slopestyle event in Cardrona rescheduled from 29 to 28 August.)	(New Zealand) Cardrona	SS	(Norway) Tiril Sjåstad Christiansen	(Italy) Silvia Bertagna	(Germany) Lisa Zimmermann	
15	2	24 January 2016	(United States) Mammoth Mountain	SS	(Canada) Yuki Tsubota	(Switzerland) Giulia Tanno	(Sweden) Emma Dahlström	
		6 February 2016	(United States) Park City	SS	cancelled			
16	3	21 February 2016	(South Korea) Bokwang/Pyeongchang	SS	(Norway) Tiril Sjåstad Christiansen	(United States) Maggie Voisin	(Sweden) Emma Dahlström	
17	4	5 March 2016	(Switzerland) Silvaplana	SS	(Sweden) Emma Dahlström	(Switzerland) Giulia Tanno	(United States) Maggie Voisin	
1	1	12 February 2016	(United States) Boston	BA	(Germany) Lisa Zimmermann	(Sweden) Emma Dahlström	(Norway) Tiril Sjåstad Christiansen	

=== Halfpipe ===
Num	Season	Date	Place	Event	Winner	Second	Third	Ref.
30	1	23 August 2015	(New Zealand) Cardrona	HP	(United States) Devin Logan	(New Zealand) Janina Kuzma	(Japan) Ayana Onozuka	
31	2	22 January 2016	(United States) Mammoth Mountain	HP	(Japan) Ayana Onozuka	(United States) Devin Logan	(New Zealand) Janina Kuzma	
32	3	5 February 2016	(United States) Park City	HP	(United States) Maddie Bowman	(Japan) Ayana Onozuka	(France) Marie Martinod	
33	4	12 March 2016	(France) Tignes	HP	(United States) Maddie Bowman	(United States) Annalisa Drew	(France) Marie Martinod	

== Team ==
=== Mixed ===
Num	Season	Date	Place	Event	Winner	Second	Third	Ref.
3	1	20 December 2015	(China) Beijing	AET	China I Fanyu Kong; Guangpu Qi; Zhongqing Liu	Belarus I Aliaksandra Ramanouskaya; Denis Osipau; Maxim Gustik	Russia II Alexandra Orlova; Pavel Krotov; Vasily Polenov	
		16 January 2016	(United States) Lake Placid	SXT	lack of snow			

== Men's standings ==
=== Overall ===
Rank		Points
1	(Canada) Mikaël Kingsbury	88.13
2	(France) Kevin Rolland	59.20
3	(France) Jean-Frédéric Chapuis	57.83
4	(Switzerland) Andri Ragettli	52.40
5	(Ukraine) Oleksandr Abramenko	51.67

- Standings after 35 events.

=== Moguls ===
Rank		Points
1	(Canada) Mikaël Kingsbury	705
2	(Australia) Matt Graham	378
3	(France) Benjamin Cavet	378
4	(Canada) Philippe Marquis	348
5	(Finland) Jimi Salonen	272

- Standings after 8 races.

=== Aerials ===
Rank		Points
1	(Ukraine) Oleksandr Abramenko	310
2	(Belarus) Maxim Gustik	276
3	(Russia) Petr Medulich	244
4	(China) Guangpu Qi	226
5	(Russia) Ilya Burov	214

- Standings after 6 races.

=== Ski Cross ===
Rank		Points
1	(France) Jean-Frédéric Chapuis	694
2	(Canada) Christopher Delbosco	554
3	(Canada) Brady Leman	523
4	(Sweden) Victor Öhling Norberg	413
5	(Slovenia) Filip Flisar	379

- Standings after 12 races.

=== Halfpipe ===
Rank		Points
1	(France) Kevin Rolland	296
2	(United States) Aaron Blunck	245
3	(France) Benoit Valentin	245
4	(United States) Lyman Currier	162
5	(United States) Broby Leeds	136

- Standings after 4 races.

=== Slopestyle/Big Air ===
Rank		Points
1	(Switzerland) Andri Ragettli	262
2	(Norway) Øystein Bråten	248
3	(United States) Mcrae Williams	222
4	(United Kingdom) James Woods	221
5	(United States) Joss Christensen	160

- Standings after 5 races.

== Ladies' standings ==
=== Overall ===
Rank		Points
1	(United States) Devin Logan	88.20
2	(Sweden) Anna Holmlund	81.25
3	(Norway) Tiril Sjåstad Christiansen	69.00
4	(United States) Ashley Caldwell	68.17
5	(Canada) Chloé Dufour-Lapointe	61.75

- Standings after 35 events.

=== Moguls ===
Rank		Points
1	(Canada) Chloé Dufour-Lapointe	494
2	(Canada) Justine Dufour-Lapointe	471
3	(France) Perrine Laffont	414
4	(Kazakhstan) Yulia Galysheva	318
5	(Canada) Andi Naude	306

- Standings after 8 races.

=== Aerials ===
Rank		Points
1	(United States) Ashley Caldwell	409
2	(Australia) Danielle Scott	325
3	(Russia) Alina Gridneva	247
4	(Russia) Alexandra Orlova	242
5	(China) Zhang Xin	232

- Standings after 6 races.

=== Ski Cross ===
Rank		Points
1	(Sweden) Anna Holmlund	975
2	(Canada) Marielle Thompson	737
3	(France) Alizée Baron	612
4	(Sweden) Sandra Naslund	556
5	(Austria) Andrea Limbacher	527

- Standings after 12 races.

=== Halfpipe ===
Rank		Points
1	(Japan) Ayana Onozuka	290
2	(United States) Devin Logan	260
4	(United States) Maddie Bowman	245
3	(New Zealand) Janina Kuzma	214
5	(United States) Annalisa Drew	159

- Standings after 4 races.

=== Slopestyle/Big Air ===
Rank		Points
1	(Norway) Tiril Sjåstad Christiansen	345
2	(Sweden) Emma Dahlström	300
3	(Germany) Lisa Zimmermann	224
4	(Canada) Yuki Tsubota	210
5	(Switzerland) Giulia Tanno	208

- Standings after 5 races.

== Nations Cup ==
=== Ski Cross ===
Rank		Points
1	Canada	2390
2	France	2276
3	Sweden	2042
4	Austria	1893
5	Germany	1429

- Standings after 24 events.

=== Moguls ===
Rank		Points
1	Canada	2224
2	United States	1149
3	France	1071
4	Russia	979
5	Japan	709

- Standings after 16 events.

=== Aerials ===
Rank		Points
1	United States	1170
2	China	1113
3	Russia	1082
4	Belarus	875
5	Australia	711

- Standings after 12 events.

=== Slopestyle ===
Rank		Points
1	United States	905
2	Norway	883
3	Canada	779
4	Switzerland	719
5	Sweden	601

- Standings after 8 events.

=== Halfpipe ===
Rank		Points
1	United States	1136
2	France	798
3	New Zealand	459
4	Japan	452
5	Canada	307

- Standings after 8 events.

=== Overall ===
Rank		Points
1	Canada	6131
2	United States	4579
3	France	4185
4	Russia	2921
5	Sweden	2845

- Standings after 68 events.

=== Men overall ===
Rank		Points
1	Canada	3163
2	France	2591
3	United States	2104
4	Switzerland	1600
5	Russia	1469

- Standings after 34 events.

=== Ladies overall ===
Rank		Points
1	Canada	2968
2	United States	2475
3	Sweden	1831
4	France	1594
5	Russia	1452

- Standings after 34 events.
