= Brittany Phelan =

Canadian freestyle skier (born 1991)

Personal information
- Born: September 24, 1991 (age 34) Sainte-Agathe-des-Monts, Quebec
- Height: 1.71 m (5 ft 7 in)

Skiing career
- Sport: Alpine skiing
- Club: Mont Tremblant
- Disciplines: Slalom, Combined

Olympics
- Teams: 2 – (2014, 2018)
- Medals: 1

World Cup
- Seasons: 3
Medal record
Women's freestyle skiing
Representing Canada
Olympic Games
Silver medal – second place	2018 Pyeongchang	Ski cross

Brittany Phelan (born September 24, 1991) is a Canadian freestyle skier who competes in ski cross. She was formerly an alpine skier, specializing in slalom skiing. She won the silver medal in women's ski cross at the 2018 Winter Olympics in Pyeongchang.

== Career ==
Phelan represented Canada at the 2014 Winter Olympics, where she finished 15th in the slalom. However, she suffered injuries during the following season, which led to a drop in her World Cup ranking, and led her to follow in the footsteps of several other Canadian alpine skiers such as Louis-Pierre Hélie, Brady Leman, Kelsey Serwa and Georgia Simmerling by switching to ski cross.

In December 2016, she set a new personal best in ski cross when she finished eleventh at a World Cup competition in Val Thorens, following it up by setting another personal best by finishing seventh in the first of two rounds at Innichen later that month. Since 2013, Brittany is part of the Tremblant athletes ambassadors program.

At the 2018 Winter Olympics, Phelan made it to the final race of the ski cross event. At one point in fourth place, she passed Sandra Näslund and Fanny Smith to finish in second place behind teammate Serwa.

== Results ==
=== Olympic Winter Games ===
Year	Age	Slalom	Ski Cross
(Russia) 2014 Sochi	22	15	—N/a
(South Korea) 2018 Pyeongchang	26	—N/a	2
(China) 2022 Beijing	30	—N/a	5
(Italy) 2026 Milano Cortina	34	—N/a	16

=== World Championships ===
Year	Age	Slalom	Ski Cross
(Germany) 2011 Garmisch-Partenkirchen	19	DNF	—N/a
(Austria) 2013 Schladming	21	30	—N/a
(Spain) 2017 Sierra Nevada	25	—N/a	DNS
(United States) 2019 Deer Valley	27	—N/a	6

=== World Cup ===
==== Season standings ====
Season	Age	Overall	Slalom	Ski Cross
2013	21	67	26	—N/a
2014	22	86	33	—N/a
2016	23	141	—N/a	30
2017	24	43	—N/a	10
2018	25	10	—N/a	3rd place, bronze medalist(s)
2019	26	18	—N/a	5
2020	27	18	—N/a	6
2022	28	—N/a	—N/a	4
2023	29	—N/a	—N/a	24
2024	30	—N/a	—N/a	3rd place, bronze medalist(s)
2025	31	—N/a	—N/a	24
