= FIS Freestyle Ski and Snowboarding World Championships 2023 – Women's ski cross =

Women's ski cross at the FIS Freestyle Ski and Snowboarding World Championships 2023
- Location: Bakuriani, Georgia
- Dates: 24 February (qualification); 26 February
- Competitors: 21 from 10 nations

Medalists
gold medal	Sandra Näslund	Sweden
silver medal	Katrin Ofner	Austria
bronze medal	Fanny Smith	Switzerland

The Women's ski cross competition at the FIS Freestyle Ski and Snowboarding World Championships 2023 was held on 24 and 26 February 2023.

== Qualification ==
The qualification was held on 24 February.

Rank	Bib	Name	Country	Time	Notes
1	3	Marielle Thompson	Canada	1:25.52	Q
2	5	Sandra Näslund	Sweden	1:25.76	Q
3	2	Daniela Maier	Germany	1:26.60	Q
4	15	Sixtine Cousin	Switzerland	1:26.62	Q
5	14	Alizée Baron	France	1:26.90	Q
6	17	Saskja Lack	Switzerland	1:27.15	Q
7	6	Fanny Smith	Switzerland	1:27.28	Q
8	8	Sonja Gigler	Austria	1:27.34	Q
9	1	Katrin Ofner	Austria	1:27.43	Q
10	16	Johanna Holzmann	Germany	1:27.50	Q
11	10	Talina Gantenbein	Switzerland	1:27.69	Q
12	7	Marielle Berger Sabbatel	France	1:27.80	Q
13	19	Stephanie Joffroy	Chile	1:27.84	Q
14	9	Jole Galli	Italy	1:28.01	Q
15	18	Nikol Kučerová	Czech Republic	1:28.45	Q
16	12	Andrea Limbacher	Austria	1:28.57	Q
17	13	Courtney Hoffos	Canada	1:28.58	
18	11	Tiana Gairns	Canada	1:28.84	
19	4	Hannah Schmidt	Canada	1:29.30	
20	20	Diana Cholenská	Czech Republic	1:29.73	
21	21	Sakurako Mukogawa	Japan	1:34.16	

== Elimination round ==
=== Quarterfinals ===
Heat 1

Rank	Bib	Name	Country	Notes
1	1	Marielle Thompson	Canada	Q
2	9	Katrin Ofner	Austria	Q
3	8	Sonja Gigler	Austria	
4	16	Andrea Limbacher	Austria	

Heat 3

Rank	Bib	Name	Country	Notes
1	14	Talina Gantenbein	Switzerland	Q
2	6	Daniela Maier	Germany	Q
3	2	Jole Galli	Italy	
4	11	Saskja Lack	Switzerland	

Heat 2

Rank	Bib	Name	Country	Notes
1	5	Alizée Baron	France	Q
2	4	Sixtine Cousin	Switzerland	Q
3	12	Marielle Berger Sabbatel	France	
4	13	Stephanie Joffroy	Chile	

Heat 4

Rank	Bib	Name	Country	Notes
1	2	Sandra Näslund	Sweden	Q
2	7	Fanny Smith	Switzerland	Q
3	15	Nikol Kučerová	Czech Republic	
4	10	Johanna Holzmann	Germany	

=== Semifinals ===
Heat 1

Rank	Bib	Name	Country	Notes
1	1	Marielle Thompson	Canada	Q
2	9	Katrin Ofner	Austria	Q
3	4	Sixtine Cousin	Switzerland	
4	5	Alizée Baron	France	

Heat 2

Rank	Bib	Name	Country	Notes
1	2	Sandra Näslund	Sweden	Q
2	7	Fanny Smith	Switzerland	Q
3	3	Daniela Maier	Germany	
4	11	Talina Gantenbein	Switzerland	

=== Finals ===
==== Small final ====
Rank	Bib	Name	Country	Notes
5	4	Sixtine Cousin	Switzerland	
6	11	Talina Gantenbein	Switzerland	
7	3	Daniela Maier	Germany	
8	5	Alizée Baron	France	DNS

==== Big final ====
Rank	Bib	Name	Country	Notes
1st place, gold medalist(s)	2	Sandra Näslund	Sweden	
2nd place, silver medalist(s)	9	Katrin Ofner	Austria	
3rd place, bronze medalist(s)	7	Fanny Smith	Switzerland	
4	1	Marielle Thompson	Canada	
