= Freestyle skiing at the 2026 Winter Olympics – Women's ski cross =

Women's ski cross at the XXV Olympic Winter Games
- Freestyle skiing
- Venue: Livigno Snow Park , Valtellina
- Date: 20 February 2026

Medalists
1st place, gold medalist(s)		Daniela Maier	Germany
2nd place, silver medalist(s)		Fanny Smith	Switzerland
3rd place, bronze medalist(s)		Sandra Näslund	Sweden

The women's ski cross competition in freestyle skiing at the 2026 Winter Olympics will be held on 20 February at the Livigno Snow Park in Valtellina. Daniela Maier of Germany won the event, getting her first Olympic gold. Fanny Smith of Switzerland won the silver medal, and the defending champion, Sandra Näslund, won bronze.

== Background ==
The defending champion, Sandra Näslund, qualified for the event, as did the silver medalist, Marielle Thompson, and the bronze medalists, Daniela Maier and Fanny Smith. In 2022, Smith and Maier were awarded two bronze medals after several rounds of disqualifications and appeals. Näslund was leading the 2025–26 FIS Freestyle Ski World Cup standings in ski cross before the Olympics. Smith was the 2025 World champion.

== Results ==
=== Seeding run ===
Rank	Bib	Name	Country	Time	Difference
1	16	Daniela Maier	Germany	1:11.12	—
2	6	Sandra Näslund	Sweden	1:11.33	+0.21
3	12	Fanny Smith	Switzerland	1:12.14	+1.02
4	14	Saskja Lack	Switzerland	1:12.36	+1.24
5	15	Talina Gantenbein	Switzerland	1:12.78	+1.66
6	7	Jade Grillet-Aubert	France	1:12.89	+1.77
7	1	Katrin Ofner	Austria	1:13.00	+1.88
8	2	Marielle Thompson	Canada	1:13.27	+2.15
9	18	Linnea Mobärg	Sweden	1:13.39	+2.27
10	8	Jole Galli	Italy	1:13.53	+2.41
11	3	Sonja Gigler	Austria	1:13.55	+2.43
12	19	Anouck Errard	France	1:13.67	+2.55
13	13	Sixtine Cousin	Switzerland	1:13.92	+2.80
14	9	Hannah Schmidt	Canada	1:13.92	+2.80
15	4	Veronika Redder	Germany	1:14.00	+2.88
16	17	Luisa Klapprott	Germany	1:14.07	+2.95
17	10	Marielle Berger Sabbatel	France	1:14.23	+3.11
18	11	Mylène Ballet-Baz	France	1:14.27	+3.15
19	20	Leonie Bachl-Staudinger	Germany	1:14.36	+3.24
20	22	Stephanie Joffroy	Chile	1:15.70	+4.58
21	23	Christina Födermayr	Austria	1:15.72	+4.60
22	5	Brittany Phelan	Canada	1:15.87	+4.75
23	25	Kyra Wheatley	Australia	1:16.25	+5.13
24	21	Lin Nakanishi	Japan	1:16.26	+5.14
25	24	Andrea Chesi	Italy	1:16.61	+5.49
26	28	Diana Cholenská	Czech Republic	1:17.02	+5.90
27	26	Sakurako Mukogawa	Japan	1:18.88	+7.76
28	29	Nikola Fričová	Slovakia	1:20.24	+9.12
29	31	Lucie Krausová	Czech Republic	1:20.27	+9.15
30	30	Zhang Xuelian	China	1:23.16	+12.04
31	27	Makiko Arai	Japan	DNF	
32	32	Li Wenwen	China	DNS	

=== Elimination round ===
==== 1/8 finals ====
Heat 1

Rank	Bib	Name	Country	Notes
1	1	Daniela Maier	Germany	Q
2	17	Marielle Berger Sabbatel	France	Q
3	16	Luisa Klapprott	Germany	
4	32	Li Wenwen	China	DNS

Heat 2

Rank	Bib	Name	Country	Notes
1	8	Marielle Thompson	Canada	Q
2	9	Linnea Mobärg	Sweden	Q
3	25	Andrea Chesi	Italy	
4	24	Lin Nakanishi	Japan	

Heat 3

Rank	Bib	Name	Country	Notes
1	5	Talina Gantenbein	Switzerland	Q
2	12	Anouck Errard	France	Q
3	21	Christina Födermayr	Austria	
4	28	Nikola Fričová	Slovakia	

Heat 4

Rank	Bib	Name	Country	Notes
1	4	Saskja Lack	Switzerland	Q
2	13	Sixtine Cousin	Switzerland	Q
3	20	Stephanie Joffroy	Chile	
4	29	Lucie Krausová	Czech Republic	

Heat 5

Rank	Bib	Name	Country	Notes
1	14	Hannah Schmidt	Canada	Q
2	3	Fanny Smith	Switzerland	Q
3	19	Leonie Bachl-Staudinger	Germany	
4	30	Zhang Xuelian	China	

Heat 6

Rank	Bib	Name	Country	Notes
1	6	Jade Grillet-Aubert	France	Q
2	22	Brittany Phelan	Canada	Q
3	11	Sonja Gigler	Austria	
4	27	Sakurako Mukogawa	Japan	

Heat 7

Rank	Bib	Name	Country	Notes
1	10	Jole Galli	Italy	Q
2	7	Katrin Ofner	Austria	Q
3	26	Diana Cholenská	Czech Republic	
4	23	Kyra Wheatley	Australia	

Heat 8

Rank	Bib	Name	Country	Notes
1	2	Sandra Näslund	Sweden	Q
2	18	Mylène Ballet-Baz	France	Q
3	15	Veronika Redder	Germany	
4	31	Makiko Arai	Japan	

==== Quarterfinals ====
Heat 1

Rank	Bib	Name	Country	Notes
1	1	Daniela Maier	Germany	Q
2	17	Marielle Berger Sabbatel	France	Q
3	9	Linnea Mobärg	Sweden	
4	8	Marielle Thompson	Canada	

Heat 2

Rank	Bib	Name	Country	Notes
1	5	Talina Gantenbein	Switzerland	Q
2	13	Sixtine Cousin	Switzerland	Q
3	12	Anouck Errard	France	
4	4	Saskja Lack	Switzerland	

Heat 3

Rank	Bib	Name	Country	Notes
1	3	Fanny Smith	Switzerland	Q
2	6	Jade Grillet-Aubert	France	Q
3	14	Hannah Schmidt	Canada	
4	22	Brittany Phelan	Canada	

Heat 4

Rank	Bib	Name	Country	Notes
1	2	Sandra Näslund	Sweden	Q
2	10	Jole Galli	Italy	Q
3	7	Katrin Ofner	Austria	
4	18	Mylène Ballet-Baz	France	

==== Semifinals ====
Heat 1

Rank	Bib	Name	Country	Notes
1	1	Daniela Maier	Germany	BF
2	17	Marielle Berger Sabbatel	France	BF
3	5	Talina Gantenbein	Switzerland	SF
4	13	Sixtine Cousin	Switzerland	SF

Heat 2

Rank	Bib	Name	Country	Notes
1	2	Sandra Näslund	Sweden	BF
2	3	Fanny Smith	Switzerland	BF
3	10	Jole Galli	Italy	SF
4	6	Jade Grillet-Aubert	France	SF

==== Finals ====
Small final

Rank	Bib	Name	Country	Notes
5	5	Talina Gantenbein	Switzerland	
6	6	Jade Grillet-Aubert	France	
7	13	Sixtine Cousin	Switzerland	
8	10	Jole Galli	Italy	DNF

Big final

Rank	Bib	Name	Country	Notes
1st place, gold medalist(s)	1	Daniela Maier	Germany	
2nd place, silver medalist(s)	3	Fanny Smith	Switzerland	
3rd place, bronze medalist(s)	2	Sandra Näslund	Sweden	
4	17	Marielle Berger Sabbatel	France	
