= Marielle Thompson =

Canadian freestyle skier (born 1992)

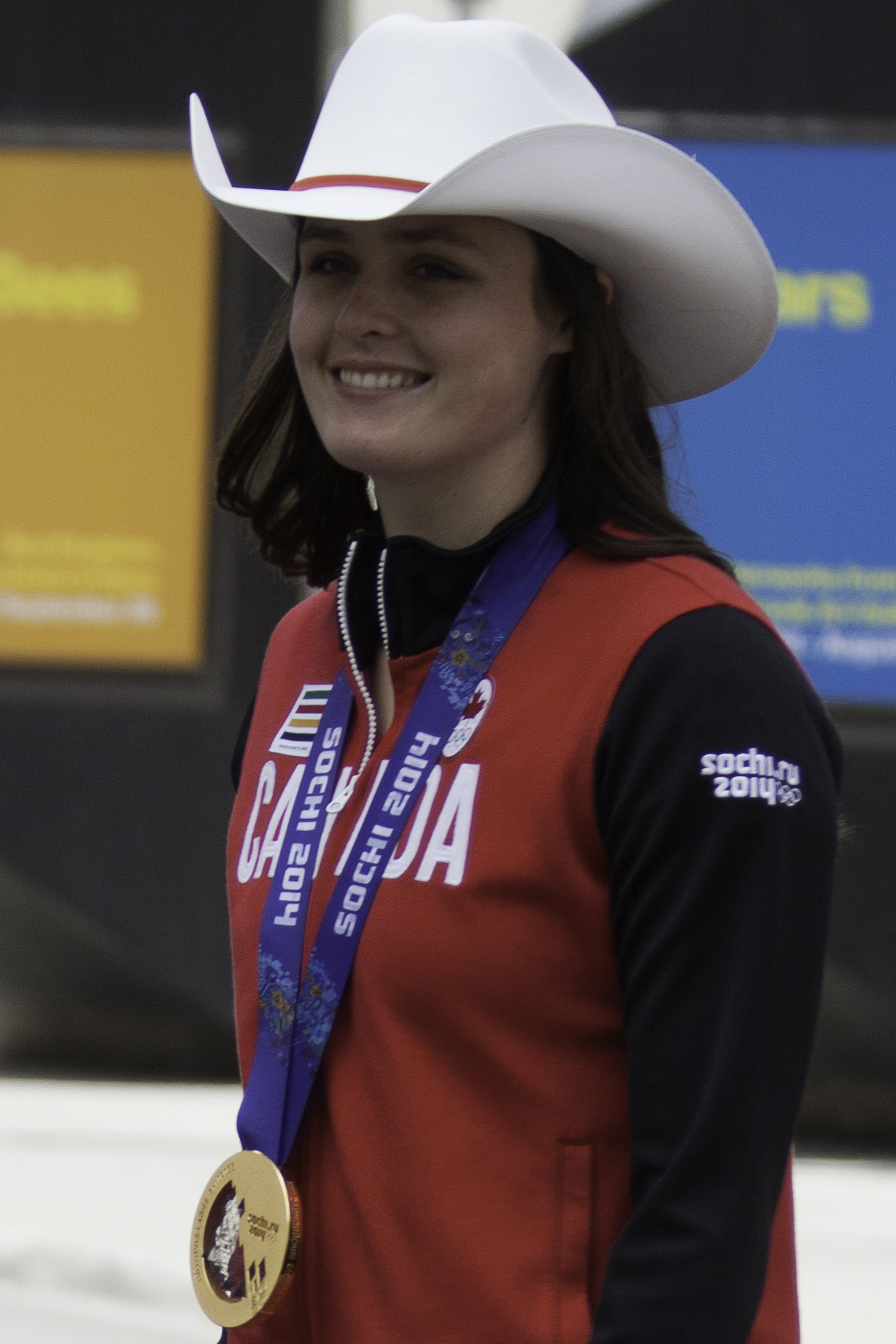

Personal information
- Nationality: Canada
- Born: 15 June 1992 (age 34) North Vancouver, B.C., Canada

Sport
- Sport: Skiing
- Club: BC Ski Cross; Whistler Mountain SC

World Cup career
- Seasons: 13 – (2011–2017, 2019–present)
- Indiv. starts: 136
- Indiv. podiums: 67
- Indiv. wins: 31
- Team starts: 1
- Team podiums: 0
- Overall titles: 0 – (3rd in 2012, 2017)
- Discipline titles: 4 – (Ski cross: 2012, 2014, 2017, 2024)
Medal record
Women's freestyle skiing
Representing Canada
Olympic Games
Gold medal – first place	2014 Sochi	Ski cross
Silver medal – second place	2022 Beijing	Ski cross
World Championships
Gold medal – first place	2019 Deer Valley	Ski cross
Silver medal – second place	2013 Voss	Ski cross
Silver medal – second place	2023 Bakuriani	Mixed team ski cross
Winter X Games
Silver medal – second place	2016 Aspen	Ski cross
Junior World Championships
Gold medal – first place	2013 Valmalenco	Ski cross
- Updated on 29 March 2024

Marielle Thompson (born June 15, 1992) is a Canadian freestyle skier specializing in ski cross. She is the 2014 Winter Olympic and 2019 World champion in women's ski cross, as well as a three-time FIS World Cup Crystal Globe winner as the top-ranked athlete in that discipline (for the 2011–2012, 2013–2014, and 2016–17 seasons) and the 2013 Junior World champion.

== Career ==
She debuted in the World Cup on December 18, 2010. Thompson placed third on December 17, 2011 in San Candido, Italy. In the 2010–11 World Cup season she placed 50th in Overall Freestyle standings and at 17th place in ski cross standings. Thompson was again a strong contender during the 2013–14 season going into the Winter Olympics, leading the way in the standings again. At the end of the 2014 season, she won the World Cup Overall title in an exciting finish in La Plagne, France. Marielle is still the only Canadian to win a Crystal Globe, and now she has received the prestigious award twice.

At the 2014 Winter Olympics, Thompson qualified third, going into the elimination rounds for ski cross. Her teammate and compatriot, Kelsey Serwa, qualified in first place just ahead of Ophelie David of France. Thompson made her way into the finals, where Serwa also made the final in a near photo finish. In the big final, Thompson led nearly the entire way, and Serwa trailed just behind after a fall by David. The Canadians would end the race in the one and two positions, securing gold and silver. After the race, Thompson said that "It's crazy. I don't think it's even sunk in yet. I just had a big wave of emotion. I'm so, so happy, especially to be up there with my teammate. We're just having fun all day. I know Kelsey, and we tried to help each other all the way down the course."

While training for the 2018 Winter Olympics in October 2017, Thompson crashed and ruptured her ACL and injured her MCL, putting her participation in the games in jeopardy. However, she ultimately was able to participate in the Olympic ski cross event, having undergone an accelerated rehabilitation program. Thompson placed first in the seeding runs on February 22. She was eliminated in the first heat after falling and finishing third. The event was instead won by teammate Serwa, with another teammate, Brittany Phelan, taking the silver medal.

Thompson finished third in the standings in the following two seasons on the World Cup circuit, and in 2019 won the women's ski cross title at the 2019 World Championships in Deer Valley.

On January 24, 2022, Thompson was named to Canada's 2022 Olympic team. She won the silver medal in the women's ski cross event.

Named to the Canadian team for the 2026 Winter Olympics in northern Italy, Thompson served as one of Canada's flag bearers at the opening ceremony, alongside fellow freestyle skier Mikaël Kingsbury. .

== Personal life ==
She is the sister of alpine skier Broderick Thompson.

== Results ==
=== Olympic results ===
Year	Ski Cross
2014 Sochi	1
2018 Pyeongchang	17
2022 Beijing	2
2026 Milano, Cortina	14

=== World Championships results ===
Year	Ski Cross
2011 Deer Valley	15
2013 Voss	2
2015 Kreischberg	8
2017 Sierra Nevada	5
2019 Deer Valley	1

=== World Cup results ===
All results are sourced from the International Ski Federation (FIS).

==== Season standings ====
Season	Overall	Ski Cross	Cross Alps Tour
2011	50	16	—N/a
2012	3	1	—N/a
2013	36	7	—N/a
2014	4	1	—N/a
2015	34	8	—N/a
2016	6	2	—N/a
2017	3	1	1
2018	injured: did not compete		
2019	8	3	3
2020	6	3	3
2021	—N/a	3	2
2022	—N/a	3	3
2023	—N/a	3	2
2024	—N/a	1	—N/a

==== Race Podiums ====
- 36 wins – (36 SX)
- 73 podiums – (73 SX)

No.	Season	Date	Location	Discipline	Place
1	2011–12	December 17, 2011	Innichen, Italy	Ski Cross	3rd
2	2011–12	January 11, 2012	Alpe d'Huez, France	Ski Cross	2nd
3	2011–12	January 19, 2012	Blue Mountain, Canada	Ski Cross	1st
4	2011–12	February 26, 2012	Bischofswiesen, Germany	Ski Cross	3rd
5	2011–12	March 3, 2012	Branäs, Sweden	Ski Cross	1st
6	2011–12	March 10, 2012	Grindelwald, Switzerland	Ski Cross	1st
7	2012–13	February 19, 2013	Sochi, Russia	Ski Cross	2nd
8	2012–13	March 17, 2013	Åre, Sweden	Ski Cross	2nd
9	2013–14	December 7, 2013	Nakiska, Canada	Ski Cross	1st
10	2013–14	December 22, 2013	Innichen, Italy	Ski Cross	2nd
11	2013–14	January 17, 2014	Val Thorens, France	Ski Cross	1st
12	2013–14	January 25, 2014	Kreischberg, Austria	Ski Cross	3rd
13	2013–14	March 15, 2014	Åre, Sweden	Ski Cross	2nd
14	2013–14	March 23, 2014	La Plagne, France	Ski Cross	1st
15	2014–15	December 6, 2014	Nakiska, Canada	Ski Cross	1st
16	2014–15	January 9, 2015	Val Thorens, France	Ski Cross	1st
17	2014–15	January 10, 2015	Val Thorens, France	Ski Cross	1st
18	2015–16	December 5, 2015	Montafon, Austria	Ski Cross	1st
19	2015–16	January 17, 2016	Watles, Italy	Ski Cross	1st
20	2015–16	January 23, 2016	Nakiska, Canada	Ski Cross	1st
21	2015–16	February 13, 2016	Idre Fjäll, Sweden	Ski Cross	2nd
22	2015–16	February 14, 2016	Idre Fjäll, Sweden	Ski Cross	1st
23	2015–16	March 4, 2016	Arosa, Switzerland	Ski Cross	2nd
24	2016–17	December 9, 2016	Val Thorens, France	Ski Cross	1st
25	2016–17	December 12, 2016	Arosa, Switzerland	Ski Cross	1st
26	2016–17	December 17, 2016	Montafon, Austria	Ski Cross	1st
27	2016–17	December 21, 2016	Innichen, Italy	Ski Cross	2nd
28	2016–17	January 15, 2017	Watles, Italy	Ski Cross	1st
29	2016–17	February 12, 2017	Idre Fjäll, Sweden	Ski Cross	1st
30	2016–17	February 25, 2017	Sunny Valley, Russia	Ski Cross	1st
31	2016–17	March 5, 2017	Blue Mountain, Canada	Ski Cross	1st
32	2018–19	December 17, 2018	Arosa, Switzerland	Ski Cross	3rd
33	2018–19	December 22, 2018	Innichen, Italy	Ski Cross	2nd
34	2018–19	January 19, 2019	Idre Fjäll, Sweden	Ski Cross	2nd
35	2018–19	January 26, 2019	Blue Mountain, Canada	Ski Cross	2nd
36	2018–19	March 17, 2019	Veysonnaz, Switzerland	Ski Cross	1st
37	2019–20	December 14, 2019	Montafon, Austria	Ski Cross	1st
38	2019–20	December 17, 2019	Arosa, Switzerland	Ski Cross	1st
39	2019–20	December 22, 2019	Innichen, Italy	Ski Cross	2nd
40	2019–20	January 26, 2020	Idre Fjäll, Sweden	Ski Cross	3rd
41	2019–20	February 1, 2020	Megève, France	Ski Cross	1st
42	2020–21	December 16, 2020	Arosa, Switzerland	Ski Cross	2nd
43	2020–21	December 20, 2020	Val Thorens, France	Ski Cross	3rd
44	2020–21	December 21, 2020	Val Thorens, France	Ski Cross	3rd
45	2020–21	January 20, 2021	Idre Fjäll, Sweden	Ski Cross	2nd
46	2020–21	January 24, 2021	Idre Fjäll, Sweden	Ski Cross	3rd
47	2021–22	December 12, 2021	Val Thorens, France	Ski Cross	3rd
48	2021–22	December 14, 2021	Arosa, Switzerland	Ski Cross	1st
49	2021–22	December 20, 2021	Innichen, Italy	Ski Cross	3rd

Olympic Games
Preceded by Maude Charron; Andre De Grasse	Flagbearer for Canada; 2026 Milano Cortina (with Mikaël Kingsbury)	Next: Most recent
