= Sandra Näslund =

Swedish freestyle skier (born 1996)

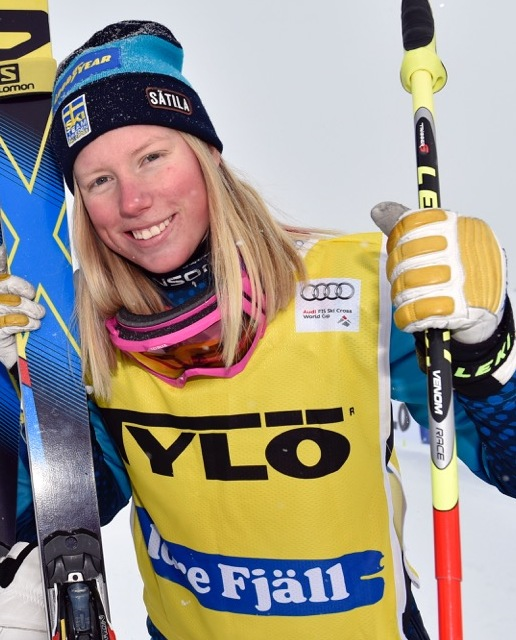
- Sandra Näslund during February 2016 World Cup competitions in Idre Fjäll, Sweden

Personal information
- Nationality: Sweden
- Born: 6 July 1996 (age 30) Kramfors, Sweden
- Height: 1.67 m (5 ft 6 in)

Sport
- Sport: Skiing
- Club: Kramfors Alpina

World Cup career
- Seasons: 15 – (2012–present)
- Indiv. starts: 128
- Indiv. podiums: 78
- Indiv. wins: 50
- Team starts: 2
- Team podiums: 2
- Team wins: 1
- Overall titles: 1 – (2018)
- Discipline titles: 5 – Ski cross (2018, 2020, 2022, 2023, 2026)
Medal record
Women's freestyle skiing
Representing Sweden
Olympic Games
Gold medal – first place	2022 Beijing	Ski cross
Bronze medal – third place	2026 Milano Cortina	Ski cross
World Championships
Gold medal – first place	2017 Sierra Nevada	Ski cross
Gold medal – first place	2021 Idre	Ski cross
Gold medal – first place	2023 Bakuriani	Ski cross
Gold medal – first place	2023 Bakuriani	Mixed team ski cross
Junior World Championships
Gold medal – first place	2016 Val Thorens	Ski cross
Gold medal – first place	2017 Chiesa in Valmalenco	Ski cross
Silver medal – second place	2014 Chiesa in Valmalenco	Ski cross
- Updated on 10 April 2026

Sandra Catrin Näslund (born 6 July 1996) is a Swedish freestyle skier, specializing in ski cross and alpine skiing. She is the 2022 ski cross Olympic champion, the 2017, 2021 and 2023 ski cross World Champion, winner of the 2018, 2020, 2022, 2023 and 2026 ski cross World Cups, and the overall winner of the 2018 FIS Freestyle Ski World Cup.

== Career ==
Näslund made her Freestyle World Cup debut in March 2012. As of the 2025–26 season, she has won the Ski cross World Cup five times and has won a total of 50 individual World Cup races.

Näslund competed at the 2014 Winter Olympics for Sweden. She finished 10th in the seeding run for the ski cross event. In the first round, she won in her heat, advancing. In the quarterfinals, she finished second, again advancing. She failed to finish her semi-final, ending up in the B final, which she won, to secure 5th place.

She became Sweden's first world champion in ski cross when she won the FIS Freestyle Ski and Snowboarding World Championships 2017 in Sierra Nevada.

During the 2017–2018 season, she won both the skicross and the freestyle skiing world cups for women.

Näslund injured her right knee during practice, in November 2020, before the World Cup season premiere in Arosa. She spent the following eleven weeks rehabilitating her injury, before making her season debut at the World Championships in Idre. Näslund placed second in the qualification run and three days later she won each of the elimination heats, including the big final, to claim her second World Championships gold medal.

Näslund won a gold medal at the 2022 Winter Olympics, where she won the qualification run and each of the following elimination heats, including the big final, becoming the first Swedish skier to win the Ski cross event. Näslund also dominated the Ski cross World Cup over the 2021–22 season, winning eleven out of twelve races.

She won the bronze medal at the 2026 Winter Olympics.

== Personal life ==
Näslund is openly lesbian.

== World Cup results ==
=== Season titles ===
6 titles (1 overall, 5 ski cross)

Season
Season	Discipline
2017–18	Overall
2017–18	Ski cross
2019–20	Ski cross
2021–22	Ski cross
2022–23	Ski cross
2025–26	Ski cross

=== Season standings ===
Season
Season	Age	Overall	Ski cross	Cross; Alps Tour
2011–12	15	169	44	N/A
2012–13	16	122	26	N/A
2013–14	17	22	5	N/A
2014–15	18	89	21	N/A
2015–16	19	14	4	N/A
2016–17	20	7	2	5
2017–18	21	1	1	1
2018–19	22	4	2	1
2019–20	23	2	1	1
2020–21	24	N/A	8	injured: did not compete
2021–22	25	N/A	1	1
2022–23	26	N/A	1	1
2023–24	27	N/A	11	N/A
2024–25	28	N/A	30	N/A
2025–26	29	N/A	1	N/A

=== Ski cross individual victories ===
- 50 wins
- 78 podiums

Season
Season	Date	Location
2016–2017; 2 victories	14 January 2017	Watles, Italy
2016–2017; 2 victories	11 February 2017	Idre, Sweden
2017–2018; 7 victories	7 December 2017	Val Thorens, France
2017–2018; 7 victories	12 December 2017	Arosa, Graubünden, Switzerland
2017–2018; 7 victories	22 December 2017	Innichen, Italy
2017–2018; 7 victories	13 January 2018	Idre, Sweden
2017–2018; 7 victories	14 January 2018	Idre, Sweden
2017–2018; 7 victories	20 January 2018	Nakiska, Alberta, Canada
2017–2018; 7 victories	4 March 2018	Sunny Valley, Russia
2018–2019; 3 victories	22 December 2018	Innichen, Italy
2018–2019; 3 victories	16 February 2019	Feldberg, Baden-Württemberg, Germany
2018–2019; 3 victories	17 February 2019	Feldberg, Baden-Württemberg, Germany
2019–2020; 3 victories	6 December 2019	Val Thorens, France
2019–2020; 3 victories	18 January 2020	Nakiska, Alberta, Canada
2019–2020; 3 victories	26 January 2020	Idre, Sweden
2020–2021; 2 victories	19 February 2021	Reiteralm, Austria
2020–2021; 2 victories	21 March 2021	Veysonnaz, Switzerland
2021–2022; 11 victories	27 November 2021	Secret Garden, China
2021–2022; 11 victories	11 December 2021	Val Thorens, France
2021–2022; 11 victories	12 December 2021	Val Thorens, France
2021–2022; 11 victories	19 December 2021	Innichen, Italy
2021–2022; 11 victories	20 December 2021	Innichen, Italy
2021–2022; 11 victories	14 January 2022	Nakiska, Alberta, Canada
2021–2022; 11 victories	15 January 2022	Nakiska, Alberta, Canada
2021–2022; 11 victories	22 January 2022	Idre, Sweden
2021–2022; 11 victories	23 January 2022	Idre, Sweden
2021–2022; 11 victories	13 March 2022	Reiteralm, Austria
2021–2022; 11 victories	19 March 2022	Veysonnaz, Switzerland
2022–2023; 9 victories	8 December 2022	Val Thorens, France
2022–2023; 9 victories	9 December 2022	Val Thorens, France
2022–2023; 9 victories	12 December 2022	Arosa, Switzerland
2022–2023; 9 victories	21 December 2022	Innichen, Italy
2022–2023; 9 victories	22 December 2022	Innichen, Italy
2022–2023; 9 victories	21 January 2023	Idre, Sweden
2022–2023; 9 victories	22 January 2023	Idre, Sweden
2022–2023; 9 victories	16 February 2023	Reiteralm, Austria
2022–2023; 9 victories	17 February 2023	Reiteralm, Austria
2023–2024; 2 victories
2023–2024; 2 victories	7 December 2023	(France) Val Thorens
2023–2024; 2 victories	21 December 2023	(Italy) Innichen
2025–2026; 11 victories
2025–2026; 11 victories	11 December 2025	(France) Val Thorens
2025–2026; 11 victories	12 December 2025	(France) Val Thorens
2025–2026; 11 victories	16 December 2025	(Switzerland) Arosa
2025–2026; 11 victories	21 December 2025	Innichen, Italy
2025–2026; 11 victories	23 January 2026	Veysonnaz, Switzerland
2025–2026; 11 victories	27 February 2026	Kopaonik, Serbia
2025–2026; 11 victories	28 February 2026	Kopaonik, Serbia
2025–2026; 11 victories	12 March 2026	Montafon, Austria
2025–2026; 11 victories	22 March 2026	Craigleith, Canada
2025–2026; 11 victories	28 March 2026	Gällivare, Sweden
2025–2026; 11 victories	29 March 2026	Gällivare, Sweden

=== Ski cross mixed team victories ===
- 1 win
- 2 podiums

Season
Season	Date	Location	Teammate
2021–2022	15 December 2021	Arosa, Graubünden, Switzerland	David Mobärg

== World Championship results ==
Year
Year	Age	Ski cross	Team Ski cross
2013	16	14	—N/a
2015	18	injured: did not compete	—N/a
2017	20	1	—N/a
2019	22	9	—N/a
2021	24	1	—N/a
2023	26	1	1
2025	28	injured: did not compete	injured: did not compete

== Olympic results ==
Year
Year	Age	Ski cross
2014	17	5
2018	21	4
2022	25	1
2026	29	3
