= FIS Freestyle Ski and Snowboarding World Championships 2017 – Women's ski cross =

The women's ski cross competition of the FIS Freestyle Ski and Snowboarding World Championships 2017 was held at Sierra Nevada, Spain on March 18 (qualifying and finals). 21 athletes from 13 countries competed.

== Results ==
=== Qualification ===
The following are the results of the qualification.

Rank	Bib	Name	Country	Time	Notes
1	12	Marte Høie Gjefsen	Norway	1:08.16	Q
2	9	Sandra Näslund	Sweden	1:08.36	Q
3	16	Marielle Thompson	Canada	1:08.55	Q
4	15	Marielle Berger Sabbatel	France	1:09.55	Q
5	11	Fanny Smith	Switzerland	1:09.71	Q
6	3	Heidi Zacher	Germany	1:09.88	Q
7	13	Anastasiia Chirtcova	Russia	1:10.37	Q
8	2	Georgia Simmerling	Canada	1:10.48	Q
9	10	Ophélie David	France	1:10.76	Q
10	5	Katrin Ofner	Austria	1:10.86	Q
11	17	India Sherret	Canada	1:11.01	Q
12	7	Sami Kennedy-Sim	Australia	1:11.54	Q
13	14	Christina Staudinger	Austria	1:11.65	Q
14	4	Nikol Kučerová	Czech Republic	1:11.94	Q
15	8	Reina Umehara	Japan	1:11.97	Q
16	18	Victoria Zavadovskaya	Russia	1:13.09	Q
17	1	Tania Prymak	United States	1:13.72	
18	21	Mayya Averyanova	Russia	1:14.32	
19	19	Pamela Thorburn	Great Britain	1:58.26	
	6	Brittany Phelan	Canada	DNS	
	20	Ekaterina Maltseva	Russia	DNS	

=== Elimination round ===
The following are the results of the elimination round.

==== Quarterfinals round ====
Heat 1

Rank	Bib	Name	Country	Notes
1	8	Georgia Simmerling	Canada	Q
2	9	Ophélie David	France	Q
3	1	Marte Høie Gjefsen	Norway	
4	16	Victoria Zavadovskaya	Russia	

Heat 3

Rank	Bib	Name	Country	Notes
1	6	Heidi Zacher	Germany	Q
2	3	Marielle Thompson	Canada	Q
3	11	India Sherret	Canada	
4	14	Nikol Kučerová	Czech Republic	

Heat 2

Rank	Bib	Name	Country	Notes
1	4	Marielle Berger Sabbatel	France	Q
2	5	Fanny Smith	Switzerland	Q
3	12	Sami Kennedy-Sim	Australia	
4	13	Christina Staudinger	Austria	

Heat 4

Rank	Bib	Name	Country	Notes
1	2	Sandra Näslund	Sweden	Q
2	15	Reina Umehara	Japan	Q
3	7	Anastasiia Chirtcova	Russia	
4	10	Katrin Ofner	Austria	

==== Semifinals round ====
Heat 1

Rank	Bib	Name	Country	Notes
1	5	Fanny Smith	Switzerland	Q
2	9	Ophélie David	France	Q
3	8	Georgia Simmerling	Canada	
4	4	Marielle Berger Sabbatel	France	

Heat 2

Rank	Bib	Name	Country	Notes
1	2	Sandra Näslund	Sweden	Q
2	6	Heidi Zacher	Germany	Q
3	3	Marielle Thompson	Canada	
4	15	Reina Umehara	Japan	

==== Final round ====
Small final

Rank	Bib	Name	Country	Notes
5	3	Marielle Thompson	Canada	
6	4	Marielle Berger Sabbatel	France	
7	8	Georgia Simmerling	Canada	
8	15	Reina Umehara	Japan	

Final

Rank	Bib	Name	Country	Notes
1st place, gold medalist(s)	2	Sandra Näslund	Sweden	
2nd place, silver medalist(s)	5	Fanny Smith	Switzerland	
3rd place, bronze medalist(s)	9	Ophélie David	France	
4	6	Heidi Zacher	Germany	
