= Orso Grigio =

Historic hotel in Italy

Grauer Bär
- Industry: Hotel
- Founded: 1300
- Headquarters: P. Rainer Str. 2, I-39038 Innichen, Italy
- Website: www.orsohotel.it/en

Grauer Bär (Italian: Orso Grigio) is a traditional hotel in South Tyrol with origins dating back to 1300. It is located in the historic center of Innichen town in Italy.

== See also ==
- List of oldest companies
