= FIS Freestyle Ski and Snowboarding World Championships 2025 – Women's ski cross =

Women's ski cross at the FIS Freestyle Ski and Snowboarding World Championships 2025
- Location: Corviglia, Switzerland
- Dates: 20 March (qualification); 21 March (final)
- Competitors: 28 from 11 nations

Medalists
| gold medal | Fanny Smith | Switzerland |
| silver medal | Courtney Hoffos | Canada |
| bronze medal | Daniela Maier | Germany |

The Women's ski cross competition at the FIS Freestyle Ski and Snowboarding World Championships 2025 was held on 20 and 21 March 2025.

== Qualification ==
The qualification was held on 20 March at 15:00.

| Rank | Bib | Name | Country | Time | Notes |
|---|---|---|---|---|---|
| 1 | 1 | Fanny Smith | Switzerland | 1:02.67 | Q |
| 2 | 8 | India Sherret | Canada | 1:02.89 | Q |
| 3 | 5 | Courtney Hoffos | Canada | 1:03.19 | Q |
| 4 | 7 | Marielle Berger Sabbatel | France | 1:03.56 | Q |
| 5 | 9 | Jade Grillet-Aubert | France | 1:03.68 | Q |
| 6 | 14 | Anouck Errard | France | 1:03.77 | Q |
| 7 | 4 | Jole Galli | Italy | 1:03.81 | Q |
| 8 | 21 | Linnea Mobärg | Sweden | 1:03.93 | Q |
| 9 | 12 | Mylène Ballet-Baz | France | 1:03.97 | Q |
| 10 | 2 | Daniela Maier | Germany | 1:03.99 | Q |
| 11 | 6 | Talina Gantenbein | Switzerland | 1:04.15 | Q |
| 12 | 10 | Saskja Lack | Switzerland | 1:04.25 | Q |
| 13 | 24 | Katrin Ofner | Austria | 1:04.26 | Q |
| 14 | 11 | Luisa Klapprott | Germany | 1:04.43 | Q |
| 15 | 22 | Morgan Shute | United States | 1:04.48 | Q |
| 16 | 13 | Veronika Redder | Germany | 1:05.21 | Q |
| 17 | 15 | Christina Födermayr | Austria | 1:05.53 | |
| 18 | 19 | Stephanie Joffroy | Chile | 1:05.57 | |
| 19 | 3 | Abby McEwen | Canada | 1:05.63 | |
| 20 | 16 | Lin Nakanishi | Japan | 1:05.68 | |
| 21 | 17 | Natalie Schär | Switzerland | 1:06.14 | |
| 22 | 27 | Makiko Arai | Japan | 1:06.21 | |
| 23 | 18 | Uma Kruse Een | Sweden | 1:06.37 | |
| 24 | 28 | Pan Yuchen | China | 1:08.13 | |
| 25 | 23 | Maggie Swain | United States | 1:08.28 | |
| 26 | 29 | Li Wenwen | China | 1:08.92 | |
| 27 | 25 | Zhang Xuelian | China | 1:09.94 | |
| | 20 | Sakurako Mukogawa | Japan | Did not finish | |
| | 26 | Aymara Viel | Chile | Did not start | |
| | 30 | Fanni Szeghalmi | Hungary | Did not start | |

== Elimination round ==
=== Quarterfinals ===
Heat 1

| Rank | Bib | Name | Country | Notes |
|---|---|---|---|---|
| 1 | 1 | Fanny Smith | Switzerland | Q |
| 2 | 9 | Mylène Ballet-Baz | France | Q |
| 3 | 16 | Veronika Redder | Germany | |
| 4 | 8 | Linnea Mobärg | Sweden | |

Heat 3

| Rank | Bib | Name | Country | Notes |
|---|---|---|---|---|
| 1 | 3 | Courtney Hoffos | Canada | Q |
| 2 | 6 | Anouck Errard | France | Q |
| 3 | 11 | Talina Gantenbein | Switzerland | |
| 4 | 14 | Luisa Klapprott | Germany | |

Heat 2

| Rank | Bib | Name | Country | Notes |
|---|---|---|---|---|
| 1 | 5 | Jade Grillet-Aubert | France | Q |
| 2 | 4 | Marielle Berger Sabbatel | France | Q |
| 3 | 12 | Saskja Lack | Switzerland | |
| 4 | 13 | Katrin Ofner | Austria | |

Heat 4

| Rank | Bib | Name | Country | Notes |
|---|---|---|---|---|
| 1 | 2 | India Sherret | Canada | Q |
| 2 | 10 | Daniela Maier | Germany | Q |
| 3 | 7 | Jole Galli | Italy | |
| 4 | 15 | Morgan Shute | United States | |

=== Semifinals ===
Heat 1

| Rank | Bib | Name | Country | Notes |
|---|---|---|---|---|
| 1 | 4 | Marielle Berger Sabbatel | France | Q |
| 2 | 1 | Fanny Smith | Switzerland | Q |
| 3 | 5 | Jade Grillet-Aubert | France | |
| 4 | 9 | Mylène Ballet-Baz | France | |

Heat 2

| Rank | Bib | Name | Country | Notes |
|---|---|---|---|---|
| 1 | 3 | Courtney Hoffos | Canada | Q |
| 2 | 10 | Daniela Maier | Germany | Q |
| 3 | 6 | Anouck Errard | France | |
| 4 | 2 | India Sherret | Canada | |

=== Finals ===
==== Small final ====
| Rank | Bib | Name | Country | Notes |
|---|---|---|---|---|
| 5 | 5 | Jade Grillet-Aubert | France | |
| 6 | 6 | Anouck Errard | France | |
| 7 | 9 | Mylène Ballet-Baz | France | |
| 8 | 2 | India Sherret | Canada | DNF |

==== Big final ====
| Rank | Bib | Name | Country | Notes |
|---|---|---|---|---|
| 1st place, gold medalist(s) | 1 | Fanny Smith | Switzerland | |
| 2nd place, silver medalist(s) | 3 | Courtney Hoffos | Canada | |
| 3rd place, bronze medalist(s) | 10 | Daniela Maier | Germany | |
| 4 | 4 | Marielle Berger Sabbatel | France | |
