= Sæterøy =

Sæterøy is a Norwegian surname. Notable people with the surname include:

- Anders Sæterøy (1901–1991), Norwegian politician
- Eirik Sæterøy (born 1997), Norwegian freestyle skier
- John Arne Sæterøy (born 1965), Norwegian cartoonist
