= Daniela Maier =

German freestyle skier (born 1996)

Personal information
- Nationality: Germany
- Born: 4 March 1996 (age 30) Furtwangen, Germany

Sport
- Sport: Freestyle skiing
- Event: Ski cross
- Club: SC Urach

World Cup career
- Seasons: 10 – (2016–2017, 2019–present)
- Indiv. starts: 97
- Indiv. podiums: 22
- Indiv. wins: 6
- Team starts: 1
- Team podiums: 0
Medal record
Women's freestyle skiing
Representing Germany
Olympic Games
Gold medal – first place	2026 Milano Cortina	Ski cross
Bronze medal – third place	2022 Beijing	Ski cross
World Championships
Bronze medal – third place	2025 Engadin	Ski cross
Junior World Championships
Silver medal – second place	2015 Chiesa in Valmalenco	Ski cross
- Updated on 31 January 2026

Daniela Maier (born 4 March 1996) is a German freestyle skier. She represented Germany at the 2022 and 2026 Winter Olympics.

== Career ==
Maier competed at the 2015 FIS Freestyle Junior World Ski Championships and won a silver medal in the ski cross event.

Maier represented Germany at the 2022 Winter Olympics in the ski cross event and finished in fourth place in the final. Fanny Smith received a yellow card, and Maier was initially awarded the bronze medal. The Freestyle and Freeski Appeals Commission later overturned this. It was decided that Maier officially finished in fourth place because "the close proximity of the racers at that moment resulted in action that was neither intentional or avoidable". This decision was reflected on the FIS website. FIS has no right to decide on the return and redistribution of medals, as this issue is in the exclusive competence of the IOC; therefore, in its decision, the FIS Appeals Commission did not mention any words about the medals and their redistribution. The IOC has the last word on this issue. On 13 December 2022 the Court of Arbitration for Sport announced an agreement to share the third place between Smith and Maier with two bronze medals allocated by the IOC.

During the opening weekend of the 2023–24 FIS Freestyle Ski World Cup, she earned her first career World Cup victory on 8 December 2023. During the 2024–25 FIS Freestyle Ski World Cup, she had her first World Cup victory of the season on 20 December 2024. The next day she earned her third career World Cup victory. She finished the season with seven World Cup podium finishes, including three victories, and finished in second place in the ski cross World Cup standings.

Maier represented Germany at the 2026 Winter Olympics and won a gold medal in the ski cross event.
