= Yang Yu (skier) =

Chinese freestyle skier

Yang Yu (Chinese: 杨雨; pinyin: Yáng Yǔ, born May 4, 1991) is a Chinese freestyle skier. She specializes in the discipline of aerials (jumping).

== Biography ==
Yang's first participation in an international competition was at the 2007 Junior World Championships in Airolo, where she won the silver medal. She made her debut in the World Cup on December 21, 2007, in Lianhua, where she finished 13th. After the 2007/08 season, her sporting career was interrupted for about three years due to her studies. At the 2011 Winter Asian Games in Almaty, Yang won the bronze medal. On February 11, 2012, she returned to the World Cup and immediately placed fourth in Beida Lake. Six days later, her first podium finish followed with third place on the Kreischberg. She achieved her first World Cup victory on February 25, 2012, in Minsk.

In the 2012/13 World Cup season, Yang reached the podium three times, including the win in Lake Placid. This earned her sixth place in the aerials discipline rankings. After another two-year break, she returned to the World Cup in the 2015/16 season, achieving her third World Cup victory in February 2016 at Deer Valley Resort. A third place was her best World Cup result of the 2016/17 winter, while she achieved only 20th place at the 2017 Freestyle Skiing World Championships in Sierra Nevada (Spain).
