= Eirik Sæterøy =

Norwegian freestyle skier

Eirik Sæterøy (born 26 June 1997) is a Norwegian freestyle skier.

Sæterøy grew up in Drammen Municipality, resided only 100 metres (330 ft) from the local skiing slope, and joined the local club Aron SK.

Sæterøy made his FIS Freestyle Ski World Cup debut in February 2015 in Park City. His breakthrough came in the early stages of the 2016–17 FIS Freestyle Ski World Cup, when he managed back-to-back 3rd places in big air events in Milan and Mönchengladbach. Following a string of lower placements, he reached the top 10 again in March 2017, when he recorded 10th and 7th places in Voss. Moreover, he won the silver medal at the Winter X Games event in Hafjell in March 2017.

A major injury, breaking one of his legs, led to Sæterøy losing his berth on the national team ahead of the 2018–19 season. He returned in 2019, and in January 2019 he managed a 5th place at the World Cup event in Seiser Alm, but after that, Sæterøy would mostly place below top 20 in the World Cup. Among others, he lost consciousness in a crash at the big air event in January 2021 in Kreischberg.
