= Alina Gridneva =

Russian freestyle skier

Personal information
- Born: 2 March 1992 (age 33)

Sport
- Country: Russia
- Sport: Freestyle skiing
- Event: Aerials

Alina Sergeyevna Gridneva (Russian: Алина Сергеевна Гриднева, born 2 March 1992) is a Russian freestyle skier who competes internationally.

She participated at the 2018 Winter Olympics.
