= Fanny Smith =

Swiss freestyle skier (born 1992)

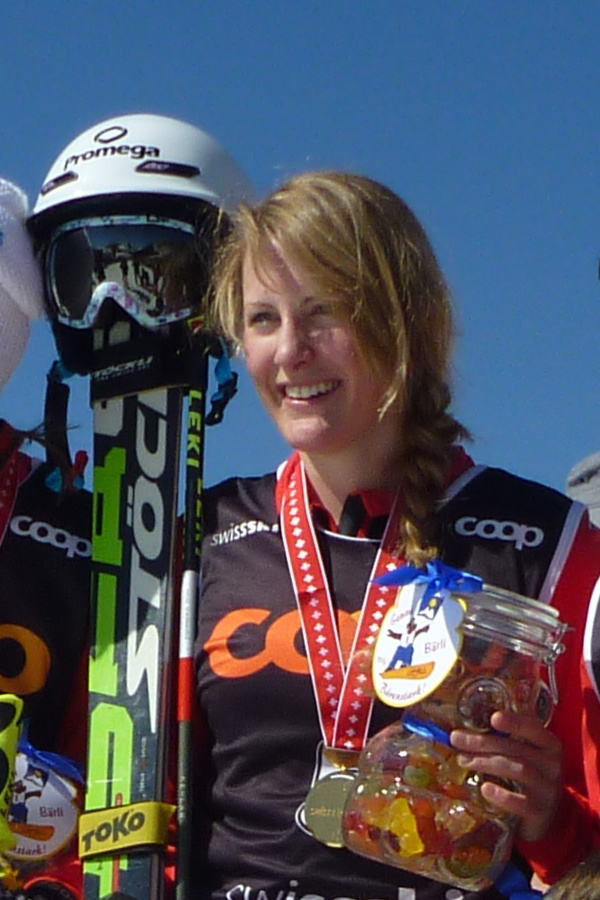
- Fanny Smith in 2011

Personal information
- Nationality: Switzerland
- Born: 20 May 1992 (age 34) Aigle, Switzerland

Sport
- Sport: Skiing
- Club: Villars-Gryon

World Cup career
- Seasons: 15 – (2008–present)
- Indiv. starts: 131
- Indiv. podiums: 67
- Indiv. wins: 29
- Team starts: 2
- Team podiums: 1
- Team wins: 1
- Overall titles: 0 – (3rd in 2019, 2020)
- Discipline titles: 3 – Ski cross (2013, 2019, 2021)
Medal record
Women's freestyle skiing
Representing Switzerland
Olympic Games
Silver medal – second place	2026 Milano Cortina	Ski cross
Bronze medal – third place	2018 Pyeongchang	Ski cross
Bronze medal – third place	2022 Beijing	Ski cross
World Championships
Gold medal – first place	2013 Voss	Ski cross
Gold medal – first place	2025 Engadin	Ski cross
Gold medal – first place	2025 Engadin	Mixed team ski cross
Silver medal – second place	2017 Sierra Nevada	Ski cross
Silver medal – second place	2019 Deer Valley	Ski cross
Silver medal – second place	2021 Idre	Ski cross
Bronze medal – third place	2015 Kreischberg	Ski cross
Bronze medal – third place	2023 Bakuriani	Ski cross
Winter X Games
Bronze medal – third place	2011 Aspen	Ski cross
New Zealand Winter Games
Gold medal – first place	2011 Cardrona	Ski cross
- Updated on 22 January 2023

Fanny Smith (born 20 May 1992) is a Swiss freestyle skier. She represented Switzerland at the 2010, 2014, 2018, and 2022 Winter Olympics. As of January 2023, she has 29 victories and 67 podiums on the World Cup circuit. She won gold at the World Championships in Voss in 2013. Smith won a bronze medal at the 2018 Winter Olympics in Pyeongchang.

== Career ==
Born in Aigle to an American father and an English mother, she was brought up in the Swiss ski resort of Villars. Smith has been skiing since the age of two. At the age of 14, she was selected into the Swiss National Educational Performance Center of Brig. When she graduated in 2009, there was no Swiss junior ski cross program, so with the assistance of family and sponsors, Smith created her own program. Smith started to train with Guillaume Nantermod, the Boardercross World Champion. After their partnership immediately showed signs of success, they were integrated into the Swiss National Team.

At just 17 years old, Smith secured her first World Cup podium position with second place at the Lake Placid World Cup in January 2010. Her first win came a year later in Innichen/San Candido. She took two more second places in the 2010–11 season but fell and tore her anterior cruciate ligament, forcing her out of competition for 11 months.

She returned to competition aged 22 and dominated the 2012–13 season, winning the first three races of the year, taking four victories, on the podium in six out of the ten races, and won the Crystal Globe as the world's top-ranked ski cross racer. To top her return to ski cross, she took the gold medal at the World Championships in Voss Municipality, Norway.

The 2013–2014 season began well, with Smith securing second place in the first race in Nakiska. She won the title in Innichen and was beaten into second place in a photo finish in Kreischberg by Ophélie David. Smith finished in second place in the 2014 overall World Cup standings.

In the 2018 Winter Olympics in Pyeongchang, Smith won the bronze medal in the women's ski cross competition.

== 2022 Winter Olympics bronze medal controversy ==
In the 2022 Winter Olympics in Beijing, Smith initially finished third place in the women's ski cross final and thought she had won the bronze medal. However, she was demoted to fourth place after receiving a yellow card as Smith was deemed to have moved her left ski directly into the line of her competitor, Daniela Maier of Germany, who finished fourth.

Nine days after the race, Smith was promoted to third place after a successful appeal with the International Ski Federation (FIS), which was reflected on the FIS website. The FIS stated that Smith should have been issued a warning instead of a yellow card.

Despite the publications in some media about awarding of Smith with a bronze medal as a result of the appeal, FIS has no right to decide on the return and redistribution of medals, as this issue is in the exclusive competence of the IOC, therefore, in its decision, the FIS Appeals Commission did not mention any words about the medals and their redistribution, and the IOC has the last word in this issue. On 13 December 2022 the Court of Arbitration for Sport announced an agreement to share the third place between Smith and Maier with two bronze medals allocated by the IOC.
