= Christina Staudinger =

Austrian freestyle skier

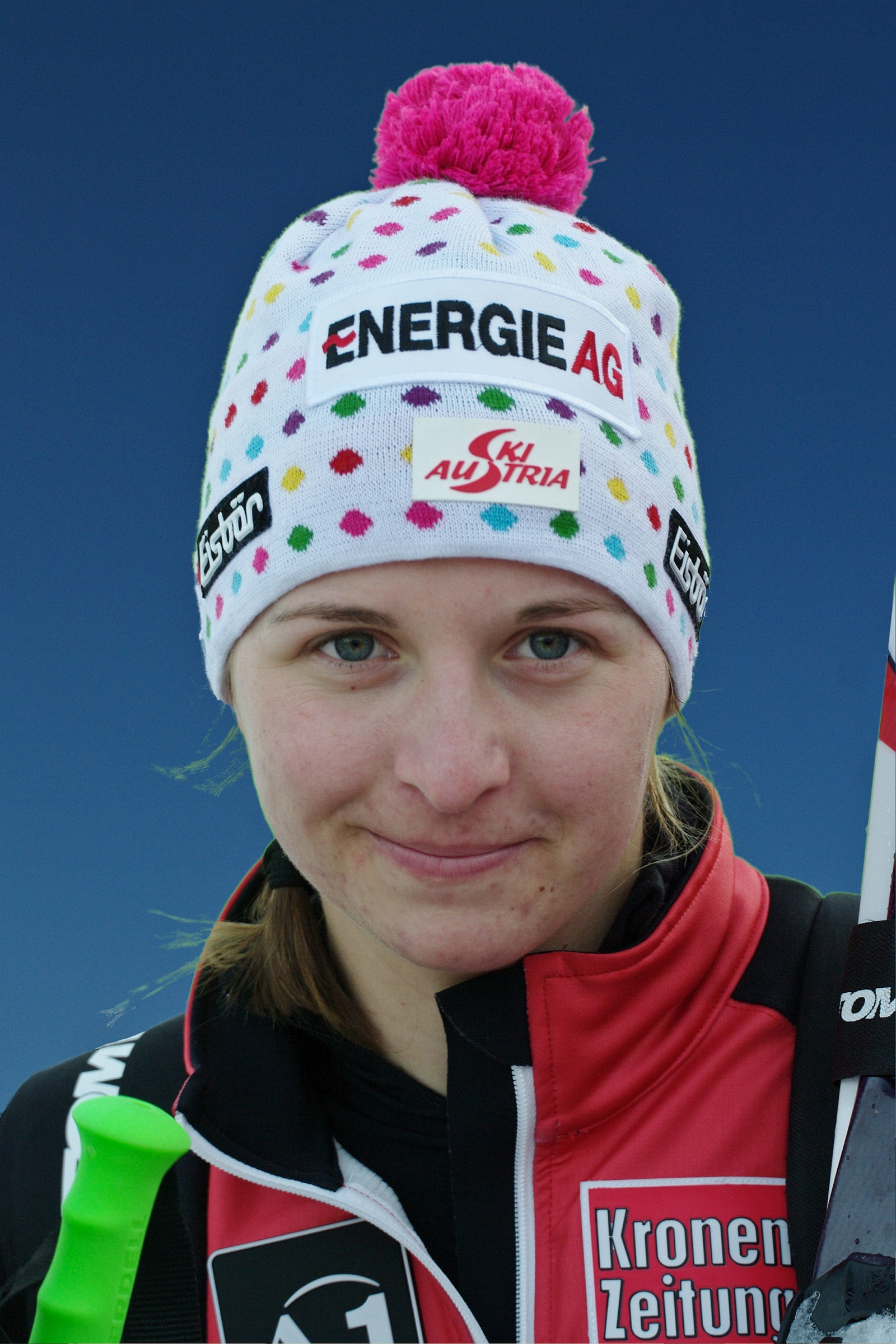

Personal information
- Born: 23 February 1987 (age 39) Steyr, Austria

Sport
- Sport: Skiing

Christina Staudinger (born 23 February 1987 in Steyr) is an Austrian freestyle skier, specializing in ski cross and former alpine skier.

Staudinger competed at the 2014 Winter Olympics for Austria. She placed 24th in the seeding run for the ski cross event. In the first round, she finished third in her heat, failing to advance.

As of September 2015, her best showing at the Freestyle World Championships is 11th, in the 2015 ski cross.

Staudinger made her Freestyle World Cup debut in December 2012. As of September 2015, her best finish at a World Cup event is 12th, at a pair of events. Her best Freestyle World Cup overall finish in ski cross is 23rd, in 2012–13.

Staudinger made her Alpine World Cup debut in February 2009. As of September 2015, her best finish at an Alpine World Cup event is 1st, at Zauchensee in 2010–11. Her best Alpine World Cup overall finish is 95th, in 2010–11 and her best finish in an Alpine World Cup discipline is 41st, in the 2010–11 downhill.
