= Sixtine Cousin =

Swiss freestyle skier (born 1999)

Personal information
- Born: 23 October 1999 (age 26) Geneva, Switzerland

Sport
- Sport: Freestyle skiing
- Event: Ski cross

Sixtine Cousin (born 23 October 1999) is a Swiss freestyle skier specializing in ski cross. She represented Switzerland at the 2026 Winter Olympics.

== Career ==
In January 2026, she was selected to represent Switzerland at the 2026 Winter Olympics. She competed in the ski cross event and advanced to the semifinals.
