= Sylvain Miaillier =

French freestyle skier

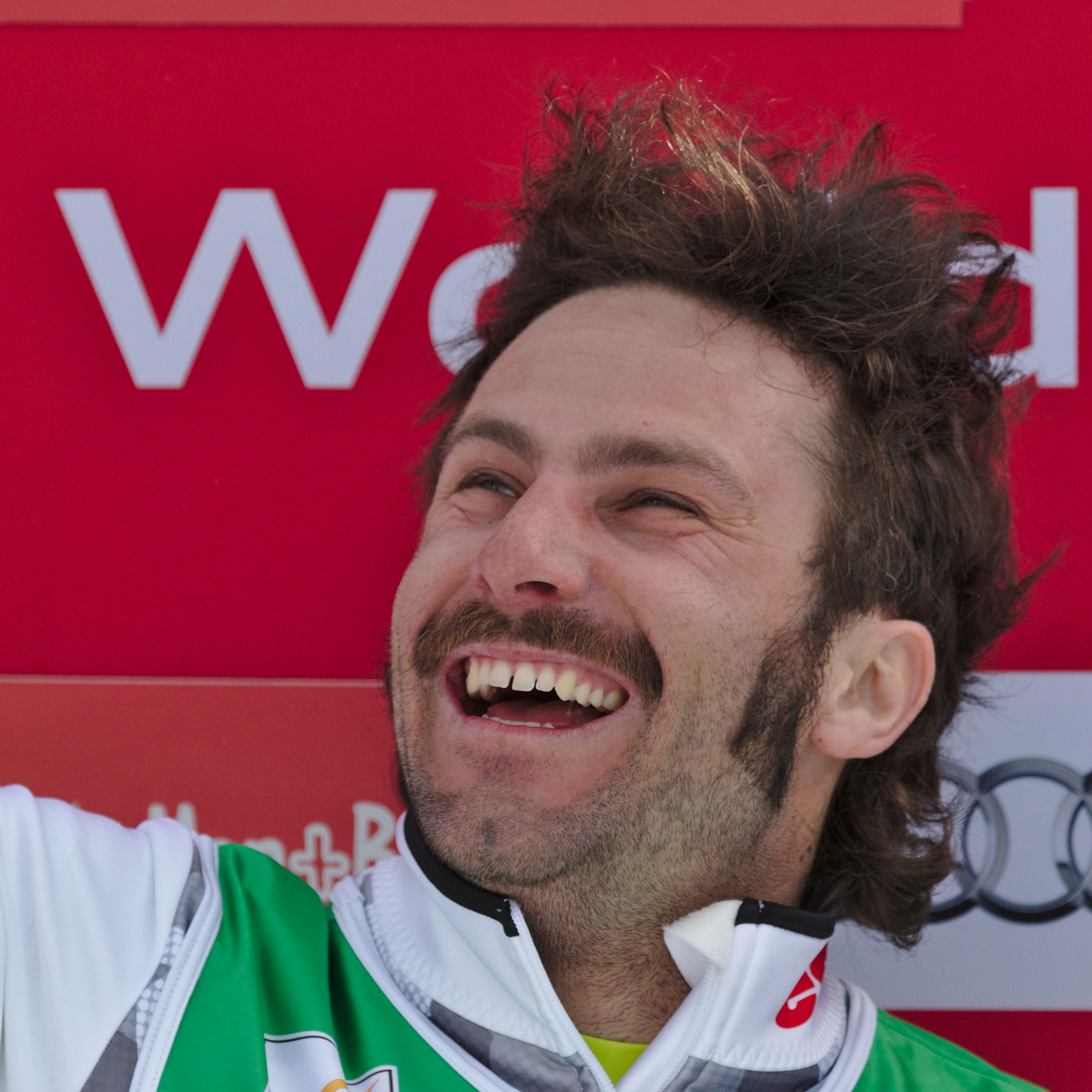

Personal information
- Nationality: French
- Born: 25 September 1986 (age 39)

Sport
- Sport: Freestyle skiing

Sylvain Miaillier (born 25 September 1986) is a French freestyle skier. He represented France at the 2010 Winter Olympics in Vancouver.
