= Maggie Voisin =

American freeskier (born 1998)

Personal information
- Full name: Maggie Rae Voisin
- Born: December 14, 1998 (age 27) Whitefish, Montana, U.S.
- Height: 5 ft 3 in (1.60 m)
- Weight: 126 lb (57 kg)

Sport
- Sport: Skiing
Medal record
Women's freestyle skiing
Representing the United States
Winter X Games
Gold medal – first place	2023 Aspen	Slopestyle
Gold medal – first place	2019 Norway	Slopestyle
Silver medal – second place	2014 Aspen	Slopestyle
Silver medal – second place	2016 Norway	Big air
Bronze medal – third place	2014 Norway	Big air
Bronze medal – third place	2012 Aspen	Slopestyle
Bronze medal – third place	2020 Aspen	Slopestyle

Maggie Rae Voisin (born December 14, 1998, in Whitefish, Montana) is an American freeskier. She was selected for the U.S. Olympic team to compete in the women's slopestyle event at the 2014 Winter Olympics, but she fractured her right fibula above her ankle and was unable to compete. During the 2013–14 FIS Freestyle Skiing World Cup season, Voisin finished in fourth in events in both Cardona, New Zealand and Copper Mountain in Colorado. At the 2014 Winter X Games, Voisin won the slopestyle silver medal, becoming the youngest skier to medal in X Games history.

Having turned 15 less than two months before the opening of the Sochi Olympics, Voisin would have been the youngest American to compete at the Winter Olympics since 1972.

During the summer, Voisin can be found at Mt. Hood, Oregon, where she hosts a Takeover Session at Windells Camp.
