= Anouck Errard =

French freestyle skier (born 1999)

Personal information
- Born: 25 February 1999 (age 27) Sallanches, France

Sport
- Sport: Freestyle skiing
- Event: Ski cross

Anouck Errard (born 25 February 1999) is a French freestyle skier specializing in ski cross. She represented France at the 2026 Winter Olympics.

== Career ==
Errard began her career as an alpine skier before retiring during the 2023–24 FIS Alpine Ski World Cup. She then transitioned to freestyle skiing. In January 2026, she was selected to represent France at the 2026 Winter Olympics.
