= McRae Williams =

American freestyle skier (born 1990)

Personal information
- Nationality: United States
- Born: October 23, 1990 (age 35) Park City, Utah, U.S.

Sport
- Sport: Skiing
Medal record
Winter X Games
Silver medal – second place	2017 Aspen	Slopestyle
FIS Freestyle World Ski Championships
Gold medal – first place	2017 Sierra Nevada	Slopestyle

McRae Williams (born October 23, 1990) is an American freestyle skier who competes internationally. He competed for the United States at the FIS Freestyle Ski and Snowboarding World Championships 2017 in Sierra Nevada, Spain, where he won a gold medal in Slopestyle. McRae represented the United States in slopestyle at the 2018 Winter Olympics in PyeongChang, where he finished 15th.

During the summer, Williams can be found at Mt. Hood, Oregon, where he hosts a Takeover Session at Windells Camp.
