= Benoit Valentin =

French freestyle skier (born 1992)

Personal information
- Born: 8 December 1992 (age 33) Écully, France

Sport
- Sport: Skiing

World Cup career
- Indiv. podiums: 4
Medal record
Men's freestyle skiing
Representing France
X Games
Bronze medal – third place	2016 Aspen	SuperPipe

Benoit Valentin (born 8 December 1992 in Écully) is a French freestyle skier, specializing in halfpipe.

Valentin competed at the 2014 Winter Olympics for France. He placed 3rd in the qualifying round in the halfpipe, advancing to the final. He finished 10th in the final, with a best run of 61.00 points.

As of April 2014, his best showing at the World Championships is 8th, in the 2011 halfpipe.

Valentin made his World Cup debut in January 2008. As of April 2014, he has four World Cup podium finishes, with his best results a pair of silver medals in 2010–11. He won the World Cup Crystal Globe, finishing 1st in halfpipe in 2010–11.

== World Cup podiums ==
Date	Location	Rank	Event
21 January 2011	Kreischberg	2nd place, silver medalist(s)	Halfpipe
20 March 2011	La Plagne	2nd place, silver medalist(s)	Halfpipe
4 March 2012	Mammoth	3rd place, bronze medalist(s)	Halfpipe
22 August 2012	Cardrona	3rd place, bronze medalist(s)	Halfpipe
