= Emma Dahlström =

Swedish freestyle skier

Personal information
- Born: 19 July 1992 (age 33) Torsby
- Height: 1.68 m (5 ft 6 in)
- Weight: 61 kg (134 lb)

Sport
- Country: Sweden
Medal record
Women's freestyle skiing
Representing Sweden
World Championships
Silver medal – second place	2017 Sierra Nevada	Slopestyle
Winter X Games
Gold medal – first place	2015 Aspen	Slopestyle

Emma Dahlström (born 19 July 1992) is a Swedish freestyle skier. Dahlström competed at the 2014 Winter Olympics. She was 112th at the 2012–13 FIS Freestyle Skiing World Cup.

She won a silver medal in the slopestyle event during the FIS Freestyle Ski and Snowboarding World Championships 2017 in Sierra Nevada.
