= Aleksandra Orlova =

Russian freestyle skier

Alexandra Orlova
Personal information
- Native name: Александра Андреевна Орлова
- Full name: Alexandra Andreyevna Orlova
- Born: 28 August 1997 (age 27); Moscow, Russia

Sport
- Country: Russia
- Sport: Freestyle Skiing

Alexandra Andreyevna Orlova (Russian: Александра Андреевна Орлова, born 28 August 1997 in Moscow) is a Russian freestyle skier who competed at the 2014 Winter Olympics for Russia. Orlova finished 20th in the Women's Aerials.

She participated at the 2018 Winter Olympics.
