= Silvia Bertagna =

Italian freestyle skier (born 1986)

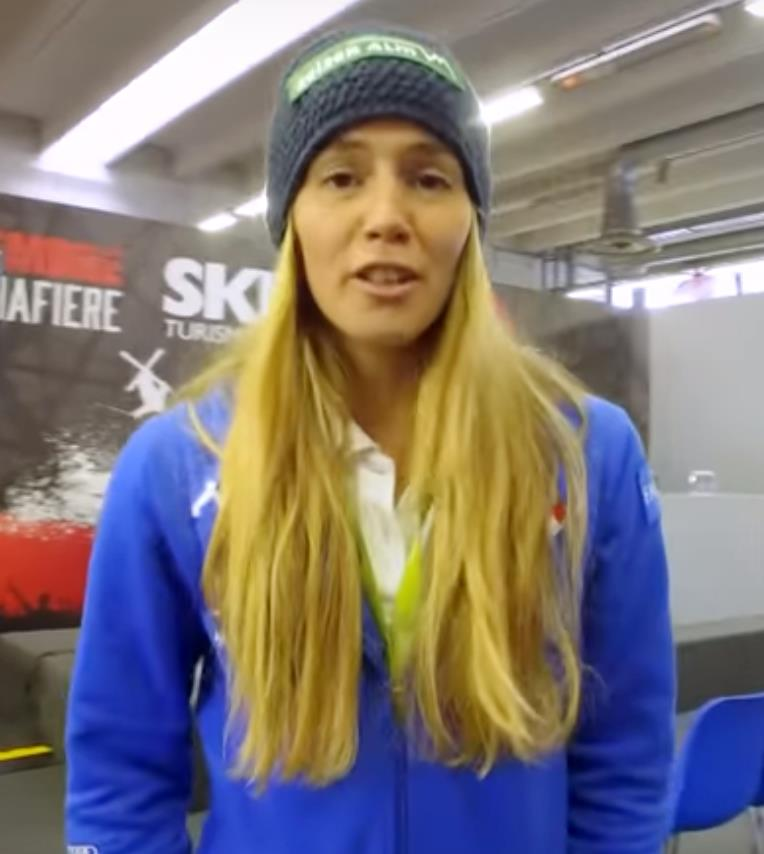

Personal information
- Born: 30 November 1986 (age 39) Bolzano, Italy
- Height: 1.70 m (5 ft 7 in)
- Weight: 50 kg (110 lb)

Sport
- Country: Italy

Silvia Bertagna (born 30 November 1986) is an Italian freestyle skier. Silvia Bertagna competed at the 2014 Winter Olympics. She was 160th at the 2012–13 FIS Freestyle Skiing World Cup.
