= Marielle Berger Sabbatel =

French freestyle skier (born 1990)

Marielle Berger
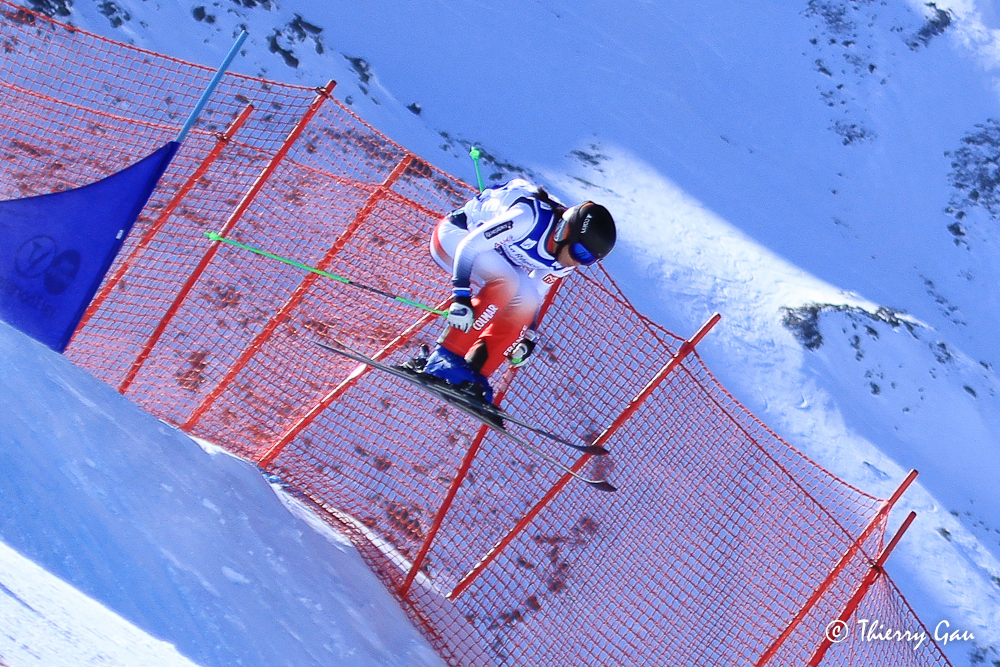

Personal information
- Full name: Marielle Berger Sabbatel
- Born: 29 January 1990 (age 36) Bourg-Saint-Maurice, France

Sport
- Sport: Skiing

World Cup career
- Indiv. podiums: 25

Marielle Berger Sabbatel (born 29 January 1990) is a French freestyle skier, specializing in ski cross and alpine skier.

Berger Sabbatel competed at the 2014 Winter Olympics and 2018 Winter Olympics for France. She finished 17th in the seeding run for the ski cross event. In the first round, she finished third in her heat, failing to advance.

Berger Sabbatel made her Freestyle World Cup debut in December 2011. As of February 2024, she has twenty-five World Cup podium finishes, with her best a gold medal at Innichen in December 2019 and a gold medal at Craigleight in March 2023. Her best Freestyle World Cup overall finish in ski cross is 3rd, in 2012–13.

== World Cup podiums ==
Date	Location	Rank	Event
3 February 2013	Grasgehren	3rd place, bronze medalist(s)	Ski Cross
16 March 2013	Åre	2nd place, silver medalist(s)	Ski Cross
17 December 2016	Montafon	3rd place, bronze medalist(s)	Ski Cross
22 December 2016	Innichen	3rd place, bronze medalist(s)	Ski Cross
15 January 2017	Watles	3rd place, bronze medalist(s)	Ski Cross
22 December 2017	Innichen	2nd place, silver medalist(s)	Ski Cross
13 January 2018	Idre Fjall	2nd place, silver medalist(s)	Ski Cross
20 January 2018	Nakiska	2nd place, silver medalist(s)	Ski Cross
21 December 2018	Innichen	3rd place, bronze medalist(s)	Ski Cross
21 December 2019	Innichen	1st place, gold medalist(s)	Ski Cross
22 February 2020	Sunny Valley	2nd place, silver medalist(s)	Ski Cross
23 January 2021	Idre Fjall	2nd place, silver medalist(s)	Ski Cross
27 February 2021	Bakuriani	3rd place, bronze medalist(s)	Ski Cross
27 November 2021	Secret Garden	3rd place, bronze medalist(s)	Ski Cross
11 December 2021	Val Thorens	3rd place, bronze medalist(s)	Ski Cross
18 March 2023	Craigleith	1st place, gold medalist(s)	Ski Cross
7 December 2023	Val Thorens	2nd place, silver medalist(s)	Ski Cross
8 December 2023	Val Thorens	3rd place, bronze medalist(s)	Ski Cross
12 December 2023	Arosa	2nd place, silver medalist(s)	Ski Cross
22 December 2023	Innichen	2nd place, silver medalist(s)	Ski Cross
21 January 2024	Nakiska	2nd place, silver medalist(s)	Ski Cross
3 February 2024	Alleghe	3rd place, bronze medalist(s)	Ski Cross
10 February 2024	Bakuriani	3rd place, bronze medalist(s)	Ski Cross
11 February 2024	Bakuriani	2nd place, silver medalist(s)	Ski Cross
25 February 2024	Reiteralm	2nd place, silver medalist(s)	Ski Cross

== National Championships Podiums ==
Date	Location	Rank	Event
20 March 2018	Val Thorens	1st place, gold medalist(s)	Ski Cross
6 January 2019	Val Thorens	1st place, gold medalist(s)	Ski Cross
10 January 2020	Val Thorens	1st place, gold medalist(s)	Ski Cross
19 April 2023	Avoriaz	1st place, gold medalist(s)	Ski Cross
5 March 2024	Les Saisies	1st place, gold medalist(s)	Ski Cross
