= Saskja Lack =

Swiss freestyle skier (born 2000)

Personal information
- Born: 18 April 2000 (age 26) Kappel, Switzerland

Sport
- Sport: Freestyle skiing
- Event: Ski cross

Saskja Lack (born 18 April 2000) is a Swiss freestyle skier specializing in ski cross. She represented Switzerland at the 2022 and 2026 Winter Olympics.

== Career ==
During the 2023–24 FIS Freestyle Ski World Cup, Lack earned her first career World Cup podium on 2 February 2024, finishing in second place. On 22 March 2024, she earned her second career podium, finishing in third place.

On 31 January 2026, she earned her third World Cup podium, and first of the 2025–26 FIS Freestyle Ski World Cup season. She was then selected to represent Switzerland at the 2026 Winter Olympics.
