= Val Thorens =

Ski resort in the French Alps

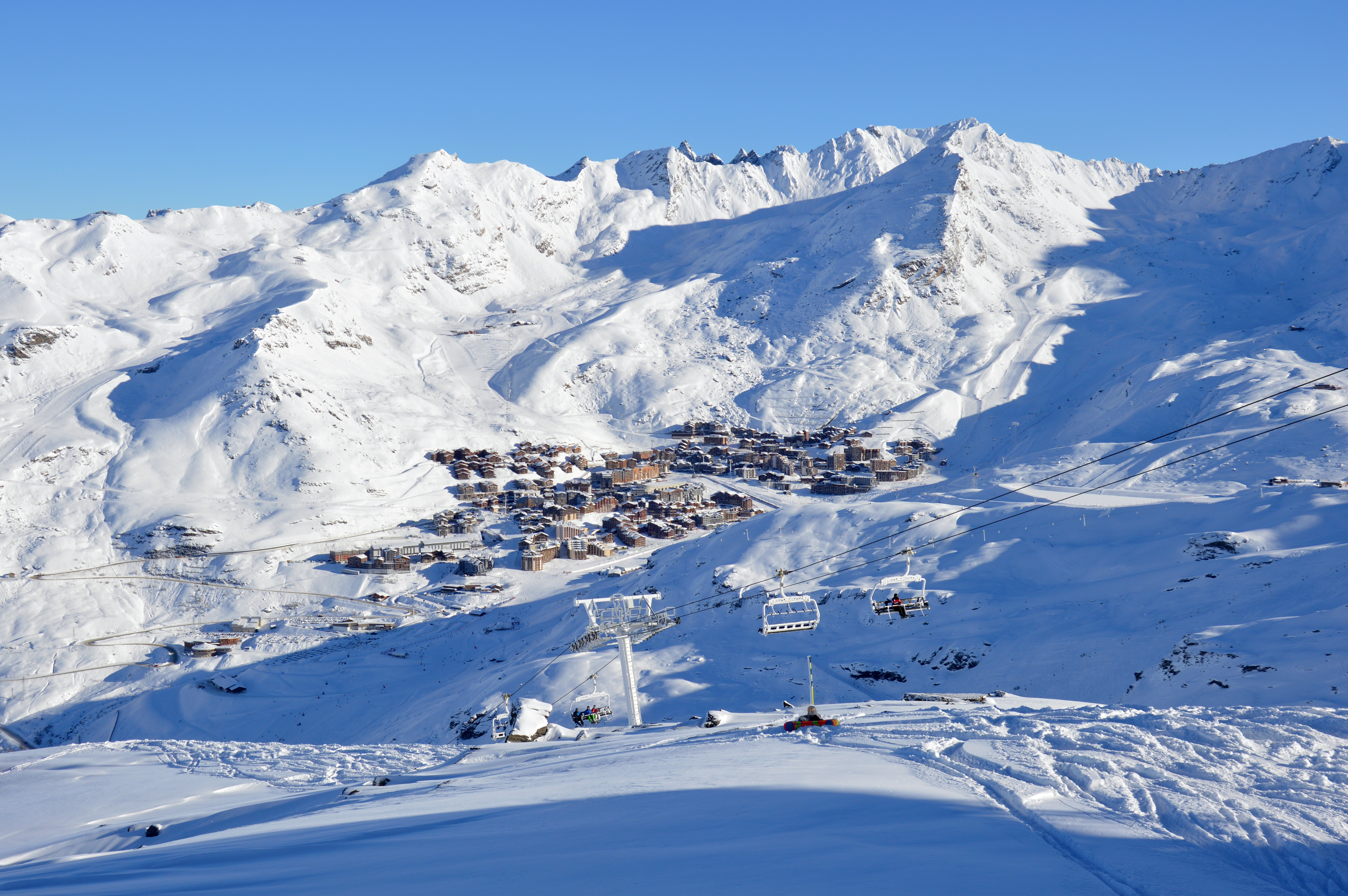
- Val Thorens

- Location within Alps
- Location: Savoie, France
- Nearest city: Chambéry
- Coordinates: 45°17′53″N 6°34′48″E
- Top elevation: 3,230 m (10,600 ft)
- Base elevation: 1,825 m (5,988 ft)
- Trails: 68
- Lift system: 31 lifts
- Terrain parks: 4
- Website: www.valthorens.com

Val Thorens ([val tɔʁɑ̃]) is a ski town in the Tarentaise Valley in the French Alps at an altitude of 2,300 m (7,500 ft). It is located in the commune of Les Belleville in the Savoie department. The resort forms part of the Les Trois Vallées ski area which, with over 600 km of slopes, is one of the largest linked ski areas in the world.

== Resort ==
In 1971 the first of three drag lifts was installed, followed in 1972 by the opening of the first ski school.

== Skiing ==
The resort is usually open from mid-November until early May. The highest ski-able peaks are Pointe du Bouchet (3230 m) and Cime de Caron (3200 m).

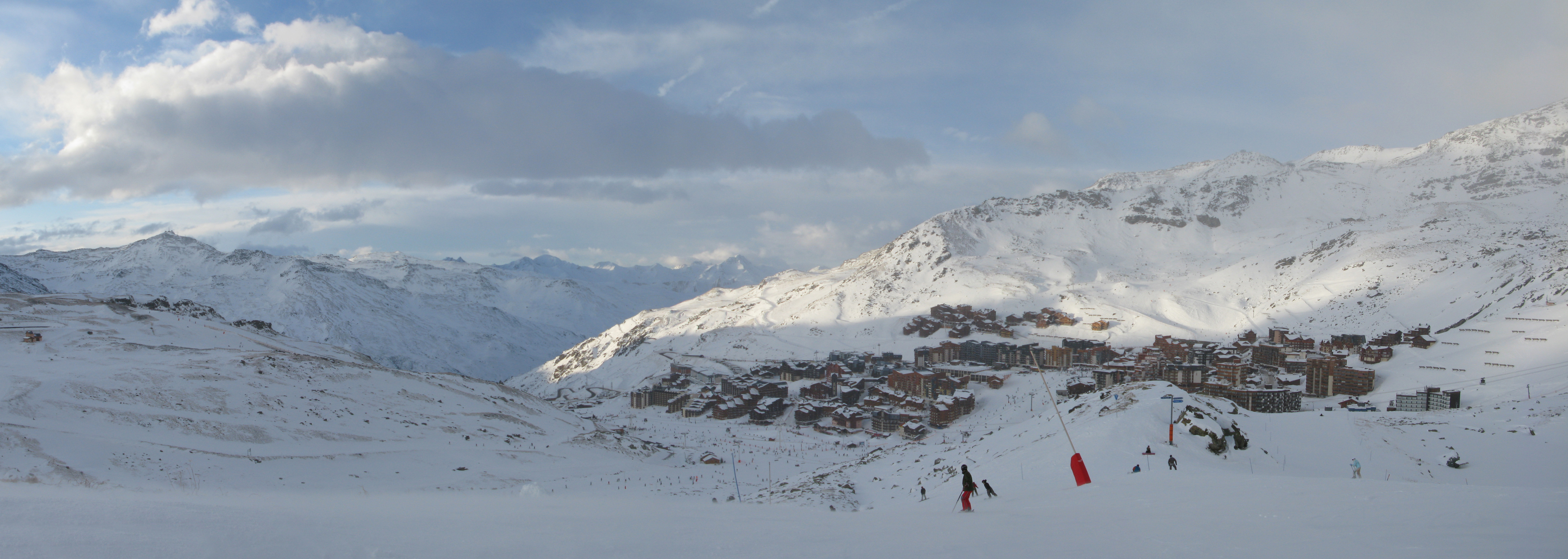
Val Thorens panorama

Many of the slopes in Val Thorens face north and north-west. However, the resort itself faces south. Val Thorens has a total of 68 marked runs, and several terrain parks. The main snow park hosts a stage of the national SFR Slopestyle Tour, and the ski cross arena is frequently visited by the FIS Skier X World Cup.

Val Thorens is part of the 3 vallées ski domain, which is connected by a common ski pass.

=== Summer skiing ===
Beginning in 1973 Val Thorens operated ski lifts all year round on the Peclet glacier. Low visitations and melting glacier concerns led to a complete removal by 2002.

== Lift system ==
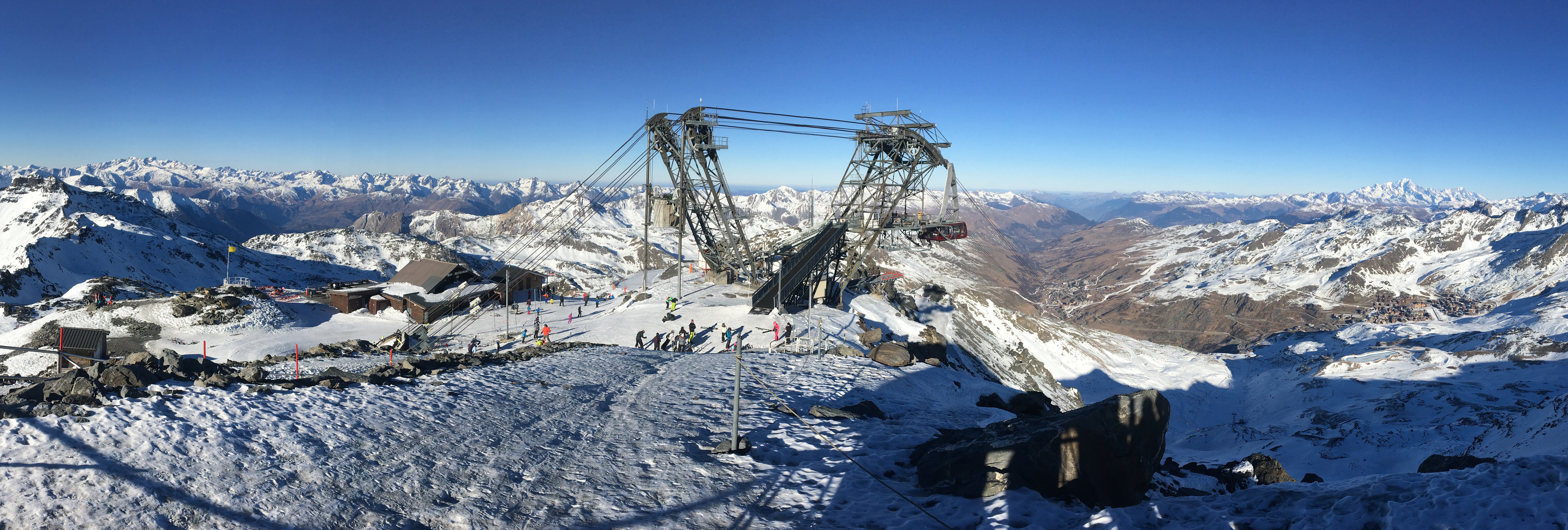
Cime Caron summit (3200 m) in December 2016

Val Thorens has 31 lifts, which include magic carpets, draglifts, chairlifts, gondolas, funitels, and a cable car.

== Accident ==
In January 2015, Israeli Guy Sasson was paralyzed from the knees down in a snowboarding accident in Val Thorens in which he fell 10 meters and injured his back and leg vertebrae; he became a Paralympian and won the 2024 French Open Quad Singles event.

== Notable persons ==
- Christine Goitschel
- Adrien Theaux
- Jean-Frédéric "JF" Chapuis
- Chloé Trespeuch

== Sports competitions ==
=== Tour de France ===
The resort hosted a Tour de France stage finish in 1994. Nelson Rodríguez of Colombia won the stage, which had the second highest elevation for a stage finish in the history of the Tour de France.

The Tour de France returned to Val Thorens for the Stage 20 finish on 27 July 2019 and won by Vincenzo Nibali.

=== Ski competitions ===
In December 2017, Val Thorens is host city for snowboard cross during the 2017–18 FIS Snowboard World Cup.

== See also ==
- List of highest towns by country
- List of ski areas and resorts in Europe
