= Innichen =

- Comune
- Marktgemeinde Innichen; Comune di San Candido; Comun da Sanciana
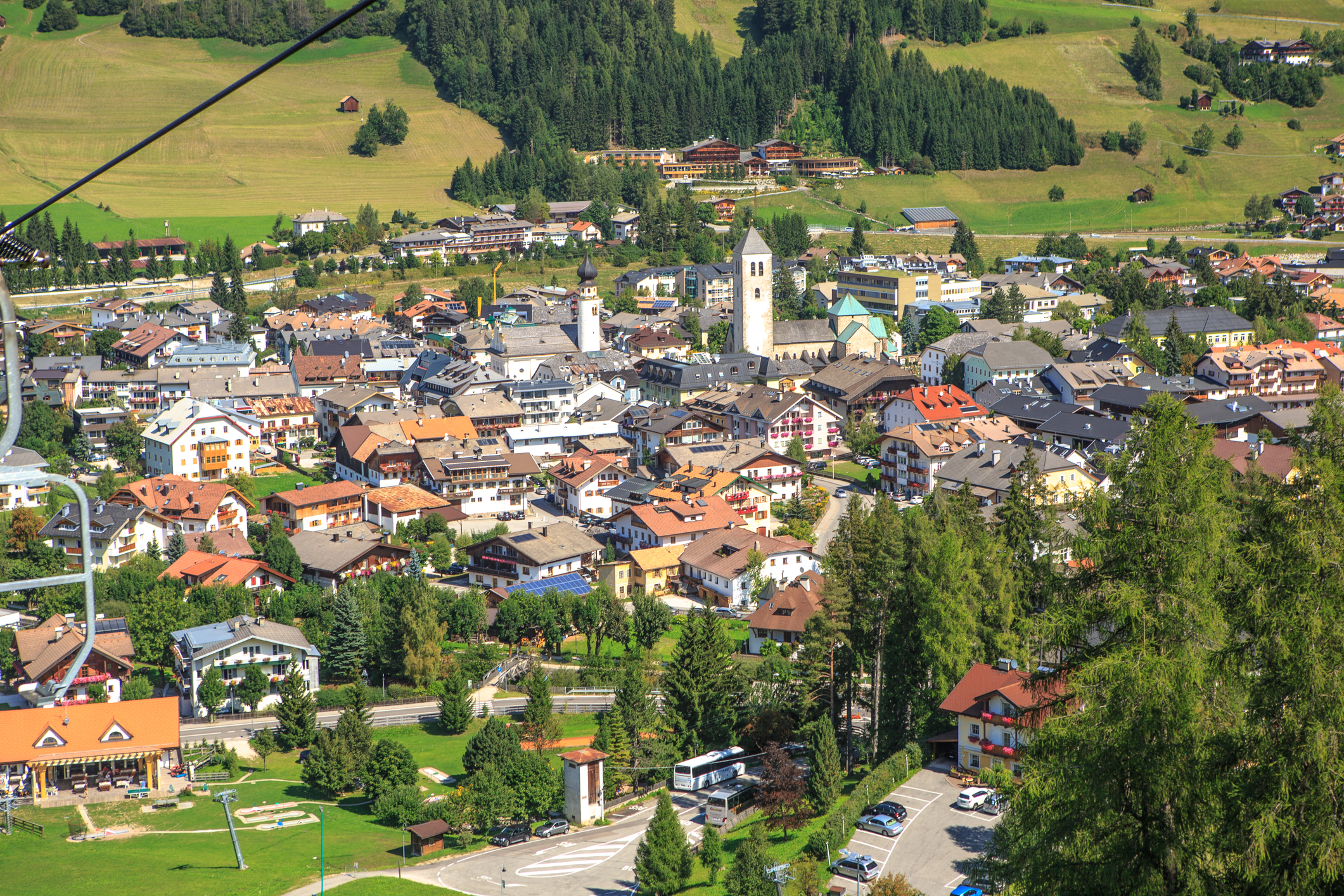
- View of Innichen

- Coat of arms

- Location within South Tyrol Location within Trentino-Alto Adige/Südtirol Location within Italy
- Coordinates: 46°44′N 12°17′E
- Country: Italy
- Region: Trentino-Alto Adige/Südtirol
- Province: South Tyrol (BZ)
- Frazioni: Innichberg (Monte San Candido), Obervierschach (Versciaco di Sopra), Untervierschach (Versciaco di Sotto), Winnebach (Prato alla Drava)

Government
  - Mayor: Klaus Rainer (SVP)

Area
  - Total: 80.1 km^{2} (30.9 sq mi)
- Elevation: 1,175 m (3,855 ft)

Population (31-12-2025)
  - Total: 3,300
  - Density: 41/km^{2} (110/sq mi)
- Demonym(s): German: Innichner; Italian: Sancandidesi
- Time zone: UTC+1 (CET)
  - Summer (DST): UTC+2 (CEST)
- Postal code: 39038
- Dialing code: 0474
- Patron saint: Saint Candidus, Saint Corbinian
- Website: Official website

Innichen (German: [ˈɪnɪçn̩]; Italian: San Candido [saŋ ˈkandido]; Ladin: Sanciana, all tied to Saint Candidus) is a municipality and a village in South Tyrol in northern Italy.

It is located in the Puster Valley on the Drava River, on Italy's border with Austria. It hosts Italy’s International Snow Sculpture Festival each year.

Innichen is known for its ski resorts, and it includes the natural park of Drei Zinnen–Tre Cime di Lavaredo.

== Geography ==
Innichen borders the municipalities of Toblach, Innervillgraten (Austria), Sexten, and Sillian (Austria).

== History ==
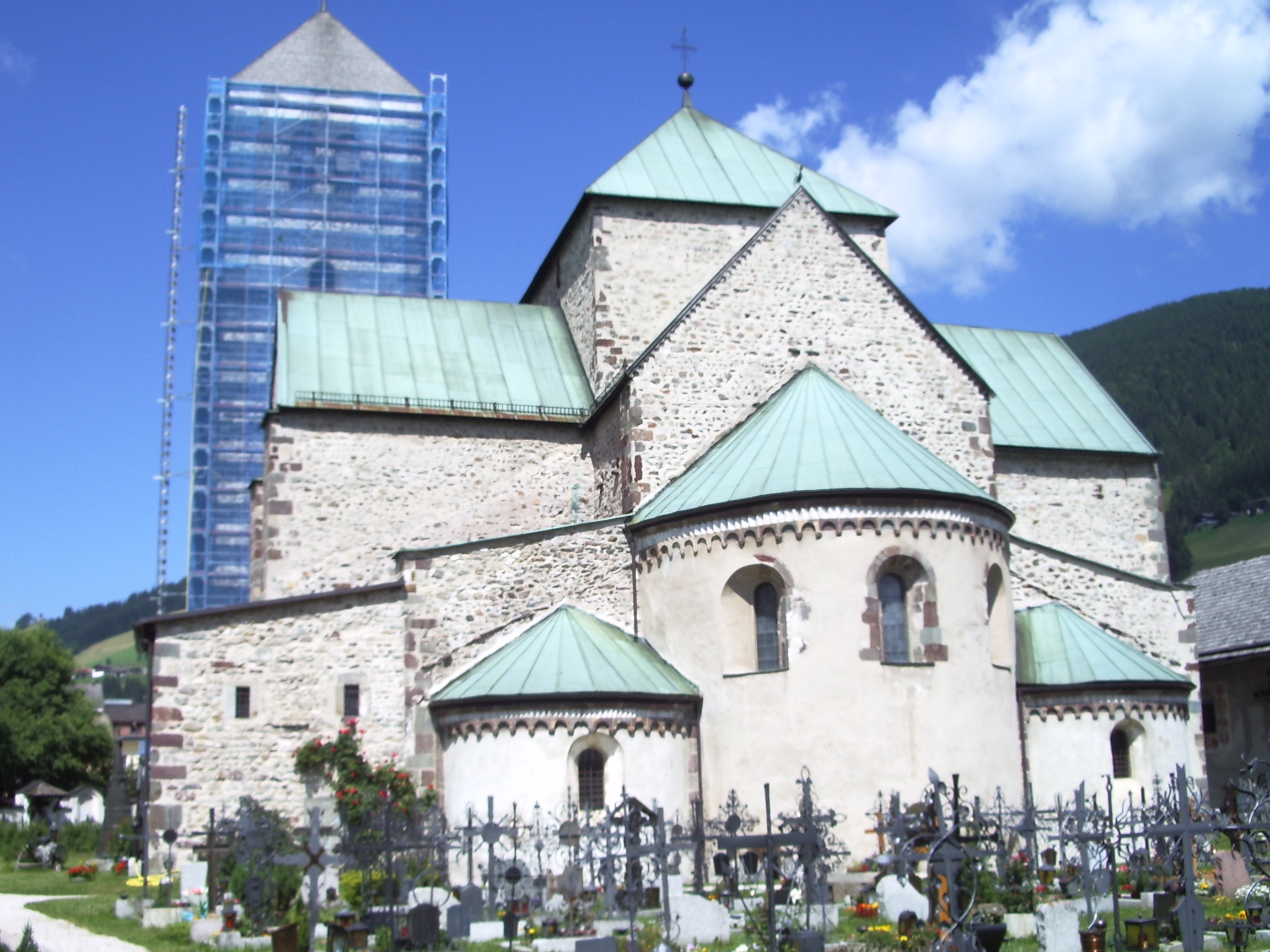
Innichen Abbey

Innichen is home to the Innichen Abbey, founded in the late 8th century (769) by duke Tassilo III of Bavaria, belonging to the Prince-Bishopric of Freising. The abbey itself was disestablished in 1785, while the surrounding estates were acquired by the County of Tyrol after the Mediatisation of 1803 (Reichsdeputationshauptschluss). According to the terms of the Treaty of Saint-Germain, Innichen became part of the then Kingdom of Italy in 1919. Innichen is still the site of a Franciscan monastery founded in 1691.

=== Coat-of-arms ===
The emblem shows an argent tower with the Ghibelline merlon on two levels, with the portal and the portcullis; above the door a coat of arms showing the head of a Moor, crowned with an or diadem on azure. The tower has settled on vert countryside and gules. This kind of representation points out that the site was once under the rule of the Bishops of Freising owners of a large area in the region from 769 to 1803. The coat of arms was granted by King Albert I of Germany in 1303.

== Linguistic distribution ==
According to the 2024 census, 82.39% of the population spoke German, 17.21% Italian and 0.40% Ladin as their first language.

== Twin towns ==
Innichen is twinned with:

- Freising, Germany, since 1969

== People ==
- Beatrice Borromeo (born 1985), journalist
- Hans Glauber (1933–2008), sociologist
- Daniel Glira (born 1994), ice hockey player
- Marion Oberhofer (born 2000), luger, 2026 Winter Olympics gold medallist
- Jannik Sinner (born 2001), professional tennis player

== Media ==
The Italian television series Un passo dal cielo was partially set in Innichen.

== Transports ==
The Innichen railway station is one of the border stations between Italy and Austria.
