= 2015–16 in skiing =

From July 30, 2015 to March 20, 2016, the following skiing events took place at various locations around the world.

== Alpine skiing ==
=== 2016 Winter Youth Olympics (FIS) and World Championships ===
- February 13 – 20: 2016 Winter Youth Olympics in (Norway) Lillehammer
  - Boy's Slalom winners: (gold) (Austria) Manuel Traninger; (silver) (Sweden) Filip Vennerstroem; (bronze) (Norway) Odin Vassbotn Breivik
  - Boy's Giant Slalom winners: (gold) (United States) River Radamus; (silver) (Japan) Yohei Koyama; (bronze) (Germany) Anton Grammel
  - Boy's Super G winners: (gold) (United States) River Radamus; (silver) (Italy) Pietro Canzio; (bronze) (Austria) Manuel Traninger
  - Men's Alpine Combined winners: (gold) (United States) River Radamus; (silver) (Austria) Manuel Traninger; (bronze) (Italy) Pietro Canzio
  - Girl's Slalom winners: (gold) (Switzerland) Aline Danioth; (silver) (Canada) Ali Nullmeyer; (bronze) (Slovenia) Meta Hrovat
  - Girl's Giant Slalom winners: (gold) (Switzerland) Mélanie Meillard; (silver) (Germany) Katrin Hirtl-Stanggassinger; (bronze) (Switzerland) Aline Danioth
  - Girl's Super G winners: (gold) (Austria) Nadine Fest; (silver) (Austria) Julia Scheib; (bronze) (Switzerland) Aline Danioth
  - Girl's Alpine Combined winners: (gold) (Switzerland) Aline Danioth; (silver) (Switzerland) Mélanie Meillard; (bronze) (Germany) Kathrin Hirtl-Stanggassinger
  - Parallel Mixed Team winners: (gold) Germany; (silver) Russia; (bronze) Finland
- February 25 – March 5: 2016 FIS Alpine Junior World Ski Championships in (Russia) Sochi
  - Men's Downhill winner: (United States) Erik Arvidsson
  - Women's Downhill winner: (Canada) Valérie Grenier
  - Men's Super G winner: (France) Matthieu Bailet
  - Women's Super G winner: (Austria) Nina Ortlieb
  - Men's Alpine Combined winner: (Slovenia) Stefan Hadalin
  - Women's Alpine Combined winner: (Switzerland) Aline Danioth
  - Men's Giant Slalom winner: (Switzerland) Marco Odermatt
  - Women's Giant Slalom winner: (Switzerland) Jasmina Suter
  - Men's Slalom winner: (Croatia) Istok Rodes
  - Women's Slalom winner: (Germany) Elisabeth Willibald
  - Team winners: Slovenia

=== 2016 Alpine Skiing World Cup ===
- October
  - October 24 & 25, 2015: FIS AS World Cup #1 in (Austria) Sölden
    - Men's Giant Slalom winner: (United States) Ted Ligety
    - Women's Giant Slalom winner: (Italy) Federica Brignone
- November
  - November 14 & 15, 2015: FIS AS World Cup #2 in (Finland) Levi, Kittilä
    - Event cancelled, due to lack of snow and unfavorable weather conditions.
  - November 25 – 29, 2015: FIS AS World Cup #3 in (Canada) Lake Louise Ski Resort #1
    - Men's Downhill winner: (Norway) Aksel Lund Svindal
    - Men's Super G winner: (Norway) Aksel Lund Svindal
  - November 28 & 29, 2015: FIS AS World Cup #4 in (United States) Aspen, Colorado
    - Women's Giant Slalom winner: (Switzerland) Lara Gut
    - Women's Slalom winner #1: (United States) Mikaela Shiffrin
    - Women's Slalom winner #2: (United States) Mikaela Shiffrin
- December
  - December 1 – 6, 2015: FIS AS World Cup #5 in (Canada) Lake Louise Ski Resort #2
    - Women's Downhill #1 winner: (United States) Lindsey Vonn
    - Women's Downhill #2 winner: (United States) Lindsey Vonn
    - Women's Super G winner: (United States) Lindsey Vonn
  - December 1 – 6, 2015: FIS AS World Cup #6 in (United States) Beaver Creek Resort, Avon, Colorado
    - Men's Downhill winner: (Norway) Aksel Lund Svindal
    - Men's Super G winner: (Austria) Marcel Hirscher
    - Men's Giant Slalom winner: (Austria) Marcel Hirscher
  - December 12 & 13, 2015: FIS AS World Cup #7 in (France) Val-d'Isère #1
    - Men's Slalom winner: (Norway) Henrik Kristoffersen
    - Men's Giant Slalom winner: (Austria) Marcel Hirscher
  - December 12 & 13, 2015: FIS AS World Cup #8 in (Sweden) Åre Ski Area, Jämtland
    - Women's Slalom winner: (Slovakia) Petra Vlhová
    - Women's Giant Slalom winner: (United States) Lindsey Vonn
  - December 16 – 19, 2015: FIS AS World Cup #9 in (Italy) Val Gardena
    - Men's Super G winner: (Norway) Aksel Lund Svindal
    - Men's Downhill winner: (Norway) Aksel Lund Svindal
  - December 16 – 19, 2015: FIS AS World Cup #10 in (France) Val-d'Isère #2
    - Women's Alpine Combined winner: (Switzerland) Lara Gut
    - Women's Combined Disciplines Downhill winner: (United States) Lindsey Vonn
    - Women's Downhill winner: (Switzerland) Lara Gut
  - December 20, 2015: FIS AS World Cup #11 in (France) Courchevel
    - Women's Giant Slalom winner: (Austria) Eva-Maria Brem
  - December 20 & 21, 2015: FIS AS World Cup #12 in (Italy) Alta Badia
    - Men's Giant Slalom winner: (Austria) Marcel Hirscher
    - Men's Parallel Giant Slalom winner: (Norway) Kjetil Jansrud
  - December 22, 2015: FIS AS World Cup #13 in (Italy) Madonna di Campiglio
    - Men's Slalom winner: (Norway) Henrik Kristoffersen
  - December 27 – 29, 2015: FIS AS World Cup #14 in (Italy) Santa Caterina di Valfurva #1
    - Men's Downhill winner: (France) Adrien Théaux
  - December 28 & 29, 2015: FIS AS World Cup #15 in (Austria) Lienz
    - Women's Giant Slalom winner: (Switzerland) Lara Gut
    - Women's Slalom winner: (Sweden) Frida Hansdotter
- January
  - January 1: FIS AS World Cup #16 in (Germany) Munich
    - Events cancelled.
  - January 5 & 6: FIS AS World Cup #17 in (Italy) Santa Caterina di Valfurva #2
    - Men's Slalom winner: (Austria) Marcel Hirscher
    - Women's Slalom winner: (Norway) Nina Løseth
  - January 7 – 10: FIS AS World Cup #18 in (Austria) Altenmarkt–Zauchensee
    - Women's Downhill winner: (United States) Lindsey Vonn
    - Women's Super G winner: (United States) Lindsey Vonn
  - January 9 & 10: FIS AS World Cup #19 in (Switzerland) Adelboden
    - Note: The Men's Giant Slalom event here was cancelled.
    - Men's Slalom winner: (Norway) Henrik Kristoffersen
    - Men's Downhill winner: (Norway) Aksel Lund Svindal
  - January 12: FIS AS World Cup #20 in (Austria) Flachau #1
    - Women's Slalom winner: (Slovakia) Veronika Velez-Zuzulová
  - January 12 – 17: FIS AS World Cup #21 in (Switzerland) Wengen
    - Men's Alpine Combined winner: (Norway) Kjetil Jansrud
    - Men's Combined Disciplines Downhill winner: (Norway) Aksel Lund Svindal
    - Men's Downhill winner: (Norway) Aksel Lund Svindal
    - Men's Slalom winner: (Norway) Henrik Kristoffersen
  - January 15 & 17: FIS AS World Cup #22 in (Austria) Flachau #2
    - Note: Was supposed to be held in Ofterschwang, but was cancelled, due to warm weather and lack of snow.
    - Women's Slalom winner: (Slovakia) Veronika Velez-Zuzulová
    - Women's Giant Slalom winner: (Germany) Viktoria Rebensburg
  - January 19 – 24: FIS AS World Cup #23 in (Austria) Kitzbühel
    - Men's Super G winner: (Norway) Aksel Lund Svindal
    - Men's Alpine Combined winner: (France) Alexis Pinturault
    - Men's Downhill winner: (Italy) Peter Fill
    - Men's Slalom winner: (Norway) Henrik Kristoffersen
  - January 21 – 24: FIS AS World Cup #24 in (Italy) Cortina d'Ampezzo
    - Women's Super G winner: (United States) Lindsey Vonn
    - Women's Downhill winner: (United States) Lindsey Vonn
  - January 26: FIS AS World Cup #25 in (Austria) Schladming
    - Men's Slalom winner: (Norway) Henrik Kristoffersen
  - January 28 – 31: FIS AS World Cup #26 in (Germany) Garmisch-Partenkirchen #1
    - Note: The Men's Giant Slalom event here was cancelled.
    - Men's Downhill winner: (Norway) Aleksander Aamodt Kilde
  - January 30 & 31: FIS AS World Cup #27 in (Slovenia) Maribor
    - Note: The Women's slalom event here was cancelled.
    - Women's Giant Slalom winner: (Germany) Viktoria Rebensburg
- February
  - February 3 – 7: FIS AS World Cup #28 in (South Korea) Jeongseon Alpine Centre (Olympic Test Event for 2018)
    - Men's Downhill winner: (Norway) Kjetil Jansrud
    - Men's Super G winner: (Switzerland) Carlo Janka
  - February 4 – 7: FIS AS World Cup #29 in (Germany) Garmisch-Partenkirchen #2
    - Women's Downhill winner: (United States) Lindsey Vonn
    - Women's Super G winner: (Switzerland) Lara Gut
  - February 11 – 15: FIS AS World Cup #30 in (Switzerland) Crans-Montana
    - Note: The two Women's Downhill events and the Women's Combined Downhill event cancelled.
    - Women's Slalom winner: (United States) Mikaela Shiffrin
  - February 13 & 14: FIS AS World Cup #31 in (Japan) Naeba Ski Resort
    - Men's Giant Slalom winner: (France) Alexis Pinturault
    - Men's Slalom winner: (Germany) Felix Neureuther
  - February 17 – 20: FIS AS World Cup #34 in (France) Chamonix
    - Men's Combined Disciplines Downhill winner: (France) Blaise Giezendanner
    - Men's Alpine Combined winner: (France) Alexis Pinturault
    - Men's Downhill winner: (Italy) Dominik Paris
  - February 18 – 21: FIS AS World Cup #35 in (Italy) La Thuile, Aosta Valley
    - Women's Downhill #1 winner: (Switzerland) Lara Gut
    - Women's Downhill #2 winner: (Italy) Nadia Fanchini
    - Women's Super G winner: (Liechtenstein) Tina Weirather
  - February 23: FIS AS World Cup #36 in (Sweden) Stockholm
    - Men's City Event winner: (Austria) Marcel Hirscher
    - Women's City Event winner: (Switzerland) Wendy Holdener
  - February 26 – 28: FIS AS World Cup #37 in (Austria) Hinterstoder
    - Men's Giant Slalom #1 winner: (France) Alexis Pinturault
    - Men's Giant Slalom #2 winner: (France) Alexis Pinturault
    - Men's Super G winner: (Norway) Aleksander Aamodt Kilde
  - February 27 & 28: FIS AS World Cup #38 in (Andorra) Soldeu-El Tarter
    - Women's Alpine Combined winner: (Canada) Marie-Michèle Gagnon
    - Women's Combined Disciplines Super G winner: (United States) Lindsey Vonn
    - Women's Super G winner: (Italy) Federica Brignone
- March
  - March 4 – 6: FIS AS World Cup #39 in (Slovenia) Kranjska Gora
    - Men's Giant Slalom #1 winner: (France) Alexis Pinturault
    - Men's Giant Slalom #2 winner: (Austria) Marcel Hirscher
    - Men's Slalom winner: (Austria) Marcel Hirscher
  - March 6 & 7: FIS AS World Cup #40 in (Slovakia) Jasná
    - Women's Slalom winner: (United States) Mikaela Shiffrin
    - Women's Giant Slalom winner: (Austria) Eva-Maria Brem
  - March 10 – 13: FIS AS World Cup #41 in (Norway) Kvitfjell
    - Men's Downhill winner: (Italy) Dominik Paris
    - Men's Super G winner: (Norway) Kjetil Jansrud
  - March 12 & 13: FIS AS World Cup #42 in (Switzerland) Lenzerheide
    - Women's Super G winner: (Austria) Cornelia Hütter
    - Women's Alpine Combined winner: (Switzerland) Wendy Holdener
    - Women's Combined Disciplines Super G winner: (United States) Laurenne Ross
  - March 14 – 20: FIS AS World Cup #43 (final) in St. Moritz
    - Men's Downhill winner: (Switzerland) Beat Feuz
    - Men's Super G winner: (Switzerland) Beat Feuz
    - Men's Slalom winner: (Sweden) André Myhrer
    - Men's Giant Slalom winner: (France) Thomas Fanara
    - Women's Downhill winner: (Austria) Mirjam Puchner
    - Women's Super G winner: (Liechtenstein) Tina Weirather
    - Women's Slalom winner: (United States) Mikaela Shiffrin
    - Women's Giant Slalom winner: (Germany) Viktoria Rebensburg
    - Women's Team Grand Prix winners: Switzerland (Wendy Holdener, Daniel Yule, Michelle Gisin, Reto Schmidiger, Charlotte Chable, Justin Murisier)

=== 2015–16 FIS European Cup ===
- Events in (Sweden) Åre was cancelled
- December 2 & 3: European Cup #2 in (Norway) Hemsedal
  - Men's Slalom #1 winner: (Switzerland) Ramon Zenhäusern
  - Men's Slalom #2 winner: (Austria) Marco Schwarz
- December 5 & 6: European Cup #3 in (Norway) Trysil
  - Men's Giant Slalom #1 winner: (Austria) Manuel Feller
  - Men's Giant Slalom #2 winner: (Austria) Manuel Feller
- December 7 & 8: European Cup #4 in (Norway) Trysil
  - Women's Slalom winner: (Slovakia) Petra Vlhova
  - Women's Giant Slalom winner: (Austria) Stephanie Brunner
- December 10–12: European Cup #5 in (Norway) Kvitfjell
  - Women's Giant Slalom winner: (Italy) Laura Pirovano
  - Women's Super G #1 winner: (Austria) Michaela Heider
  - Women's Super G #2 winner: (Austria) Michaela Heider
  - Women's Alpine combined winner: (Norway) Maren Skjoeld
- December 10 & 11: European Cup #6 in (Austria) Sölden
  - Men's Super G #1 winner: (Austria) Christopher Neumayer
  - Men's Super G #2 winner: (Austria) Christian Walder
  - Men's Alpine Combined winner: (Norway) Bjørnar Neteland
- December 15 – 18: European Cup #7 in (Switzerland) St. Moritz
  - This stage was cancelled
- December 16: European Cup #8 in (Italy) Obereggen
  - Men's Slalom winner: (France) Robin Buffet
- December 19: European Cup #9 in (Italy) Kronplatz
  - Men's Parallel Slalom winner: (Austria) Christian Hirschbuehl
- December 21: European Cup #10 in (Italy) Pozza di Fassa
  - Men's Slalom winner: (Switzerland) Marc Gini
- January 3 & 4: European Cup #11 in (France) Val Cenis
  - Men's Slalom winner: (Switzerland) Marc Gini
  - Men's Slalom winner: (France) Robin Buffet
- January 4–7: European Cup #12 in (Switzerland) Zinal
  - Women's Giant Slalom #1 winner: (Italy) Karoline Pichler
  - Women's Giant Slalom #2 winner: (Austria) Stephanie Brunner
  - Women's Slalom #1 winner: (Slovenia) Ana Bucik
  - Women's Slalom #2 winner: (Slovenia) Ana Bucik
- January 6–9: European Cup #13 in (Switzerland) Wengen
  - This stage was cancelled
- January 11–15: European Cup #14 in (Austria) Altenmarkt im Pongau
  - Women's Downhill #1 winner: (United States) Breezy Johnson
  - Women's Downhill #2 winner: (Switzerland) Joana Hählen
  - Women's Super G it's cancelled
  - Women's Downhill #3 winner: (Germany) Kira Weidle
- January 13: European Cup #15 in (Italy) Folgaria–Lavarone
  - Men's Giant Slalom #1 winner: (Italy) Riccardo Tonetti
  - Men's Giant Slalom #2 winner: (Italy) Simon Maurberger
- January 14 & 15: European Cup #16 in (Austria) Radstadt–Reiteralm
  - Men's Super G #1 winner: (Italy) Emanuele Buzzi
  - Men's Super G #2 winner: (Norway) Marcus Monsen / (Norway) Bjørnar Neteland
- January 16 & 17: European Cup #17 in (Austria) Zell am See
  - Men's Slalom #1 winner: (France) François Place
  - Men's Slalom #2 winner: (Croatia) Matej Vidović
- January 16 & 17: European Cup #18 in (Austria) Hochkar–Göstling
  - Women's Giant Slalom winner: (Austria) Stephanie Brunner
  - Women's Slalom winner: (Germany) Elisabeth Willibald
- January 20 & 21: European Cup #19 in (France) Val-d'Isère
  - Men's Giant Slalom #1 winner: (Switzerland) Loïc Meillard
  - Men's Giant Slalom #2 winner: (Switzerland) Loïc Meillard
- January 21 & 22: European Cup #20 in (Germany) Bad Hindelang–Oberjoch #1
  - Women's Slalom #1 winner: (Austria) Katharina Gallhuber
  - Women's Slalom #2 winner: (Norway) Maren Skjoeld
- January 23 – 26: European Cup #21 in (France) Méribel
  - Event's cancelled
- January 25 & 26: European Cup #22 in (France) Châtel
  - Women's Super G #1 winner: (France) Romane Miradoli
  - Women's Super G #2 winner: (Italy) Lisa Magdalena Agerer
  - Women's Alpine combined winner: (Switzerland) Rahel Kopp
- January 25 – 27: European Cup #23 in (Switzerland) Davos
  - Men's Downhill #1 winner: (Italy) Emanuele Buzzi
  - Men's Downhill #2 winner: (Switzerland) Ralph Weber
- January 28 & 29: European Cup #24 in (Italy) Sestriere
  - Women's Giant Slalom winner: (Austria) Stephanie Brunner
  - Women's Slalom winner: (Germany) Elisabeth Willibald
- January 28 & 29: European Cup #25 in (Switzerland) Zuoz
  - Men's Giant Slalom #1 winner: (Germany) Benedikt Staubitzer
  - Men's Giant Slalom #2 winner: (Finland) Eemeli Pirinen
- February 1 – 5: European Cup #26 in (Switzerland) Davos
  - Women's Downhill #1 winner: (Switzerland) Beatrice Scalvedi
  - Women's Downhill #2 winner: (Italy) Anna Hofer
  - Women's Super G winner: (Italy) Verena Gasslitter
- February 1 – 5: European Cup #27 in (Italy) Sarntal–Reinswald
  - Men's Downhill #1 winner: (Austria) Frederic Berthold
  - Men's Downhill #2 winner: (France) Nicolas Raffort
  - Men's Alpine combined winner: (Italy) Paolo Pangrazzi
  - Men's Super G winner: (Norway) Stian Saugestad
- February 9 & 10: European Cup #28 in (Bulgaria) Pamporovo
  - Women's Slalom #1 winner: (Russia) Ksenia Alopina
  - Women's Slalom #2 winner: (Sweden) Anna Swenn-Larsson
- February 12 & 13: European Cup #29 in (Bulgaria) Borovets
  - Women's Giant Slalom #1 winner: (Austria) Stephanie Brunner
  - Women's Giant Slalom #2 winner: (Switzerland) Simone Wild
- March 8 – 12: European Cup #30 in (Bulgaria) Saalbach-Hinterglemm
- March 12 & 13: European Cup #31 in (Germany) Bad Hindelang–Oberjoch #2
- March 15 – 17: European Cup #32 (final) in (Spain) La Molina

=== 2015–16 FIS North America Cup of Alpine Skiing ===
- November 24 – 27: FIS North America Cup #1 in (United States) Jackson
  - Women's Slalom #1 winner: (Canada) Marie-Michèle Gagnon
  - Women's Slalom #2 winner: (Canada) Erin Mielzynski
  - Men's Slalom #1 winner: (Italy) Andrea Ballerini
  - Men's Slalom #2 winner: (Norway) Espen Lysdahl
- November 30 – December 3: FIS North America Cup #2 in (United States) Copper Mountain
  - Men's Giant Slalom #1 winner: (United States) Tommy Ford
  - Men's Giant Slalom #2 winner: (United States) Tommy Ford
  - Women's Giant Slalom #1 winner: (Canada) Marie-Michèle Gagnon
  - Women's Giant Slalom #2 winner: (Canada) Marie-Michèle Gagnon
- December 7–11: FIS North America Cup #3 in (Canada) Lake Louise
  - Men's Downhill #1 winner: (Canada) Jeffrey Frisch
  - Men's Downhill #2 winner: (Croatia) Natko Zrnčić-Dim
  - Women's Downhill #1 winner: (United States) Cecily Decker
  - Women's Downhill #2 winner: (United States) Breezy Johnson
- December 12–17: FIS North America Cup #4 in (Canada) Panorama
  - Men's Super G winner: (Canada) Tyler Werry
  - Men's Alpine combined winner: (Canada) Erik Read
  - Women's Super G winner: (United States) Anna Marno
  - Women's Alpine combined winner: (United States) Megan McJames
  - Men's Giant Slalom #1 winner: (Canada) Erik Read
  - Men's Giant Slalom #2 winner: (Andorra) Joan Verdu Sanchez
  - Women's Giant Slalom #1 winner: (Norway) Kristine Gjelsten Haugen
  - Women's Giant Slalom #2 winner: (Norway) Kristine Gjelsten Haugen
  - Women's Slalom #1 winner: (United States) Lila Lapanja
  - Women's Slalom #2 winner: (United States) Lila Lapanja
  - Men's Slalom #1 winner: (Canada) Erik Read
  - Men's Slalom #2 winner: (Canada) Erik Read
- February 4 & 5, 2016: FIS North America Cup #5 in (Canada) Mont Garceau
  - Women's Giant Slalom #1 winner: (United States) Megan McJames
  - Women's Giant Slalom #2 winner: (United States) Paula Moltzan
- February 4 – 7, 2016: FIS North America Cup #6 in (Canada) Mont-Sainte-Anne
  - Men's Giant Slalom #1 winner: (United States) Brennan Rubie
  - Men's Giant Slalom #2 winner: (United States) Brennan Rubie
  - Men's Slalom #1 winner: (United States) Tim Kelley
  - Men's Slalom #2 winner: (Austria) Michael Matt
- February 6 & 7, 2016: FIS North America Cup #7 in (Canada) Mont Tremblant Resort
  - Women's Slalom #1 winner: (United States) Lila Lapanja
  - Women's Slalom #2 winner: (United Kingdom) Alexandra Tilley
- February 9 – 12, 2016: FIS North America Cup #8 in (United States) Whiteface Mountain
  - Men's Giant Slalom winner: (Austria) Stefan Brennsteiner
  - Women's Giant Slalom winner: (United States) Megan McJames
  - Men's Alpine combined winner: (Canada) James Crawford
  - Women's Alpine combined winner: (United States) Megan McJames
  - Men's Super G #1 winner: (United States) Erik Arvidsson
  - Men's Super G #2 winner: (Canada) James Crawford
  - Women's Super G #1 winner: (United States) Megan McJames
  - Women's Super G #2 winner: (Canada) Candace Crawford

=== Alpine Skiing FIS Far East Cup 2015–2016 ===
- December 15–18, 2015: FIS Far East Cup #1 in (China) Zhangjiakou
  - Men's Slalom #1 winner: (South Korea) Kim Hyeon-tae
  - Men's Slalom #2 winner: (Japan) Ryunosuke Ohkoshi
  - Women's Slalom #1 winner: (Czech Republic) Martina Dubovská
  - Women's Slalom #2 winner: (Czech Republic) Martina Dubovská
  - Men's Giant Slalom #1 winner: (Russia) Dmitrij Ulyanov
  - Men's Giant Slalom #2 winner: (Japan) Hideyuki Narita
  - Women's Giant Slalom #1 winner: (Czech Republic) Martina Dubovská
  - Women's Giant Slalom #2 winner: (Japan) Asa Ando
- January 14–16, 2016: FIS Far East Cup #2 in (South Korea) Bear's Town–Seoul
  - Women's Slalom winner: (Russia) Daria Ovchinikova
  - Men's Slalom winner: (Japan) Ryunosuke Ohkoshi
  - Women's Slalom winner: (Japan) Asa Ando
  - Men's Slalom winner: (South Korea) Jung Dong-hyun
- January 18 & 19, 2016: FIS Far East Cup #3 in (South Korea) Jisan Resort
  - Women's Slalom #1 winner: (Slovenia) Maruša Ferk
  - Women's Slalom #2 winner: (Slovenia) Maruša Ferk
  - Men's Slalom #1 winner: (Japan) Ryunosuke Ohkoshi
  - Men's Slalom #2 winner: (South Korea) Jung Dong-hyun
- January 20 – 22, 2016: FIS Far East Cup #4 in (South Korea) Yongpyong Ski Resort
  - Women's Giant Slalom #1 winner: (Japan) Emi Hasegawa
  - Women's Giant Slalom #2 winner: (Japan) Emi Hasegawa
  - Men's Giant Slalom #1 winner: (Russia) Evgenij Pyasik
  - Men's Giant Slalom #2 winner: (Russia) Evgenij Pyasik
  - Men's Slalom winner: (Russia) Sergei Maitakov
  - Women's Slalom winner: (South Korea) Kang Young-seo
- January 25 – 28, 2016: FIS Far East Cup #5 in (South Korea) Jeongseon Alpine Centre
  - Events cancelled
- February 29 – March 1, 2016: FIS Far East Cup #6 in (Japan) Hakuba
  - Men's Slalom #1 winner: (South Korea) Jung Dong-hyun
  - Men's Slalom #2 winner: (Japan) Ryunosuke Ohkoshi
  - Women's Slalom #1 winner: (Japan) Emi Hasegawa
  - Women's Slalom #2 winner: (Japan) Emi Hasegawa

=== 2016 IPC Alpine Skiing World Cup ===
- January 15 & 16: IPC AS World Cup #1 in (Slovenia) Kranjska Gora
  - Note: Event was moved from Abtenau, Austria, due to lack of snow.
  - For results, click here.
- January 18 & 19: IPC AS World Cup #2 in (Italy) Tarvisio
  - For results, click here.
- January 21 – 23: IPC AS World Cup #3 in (Switzerland) St. Moritz
  - For results, click here.
- January 25 – 29: IPC AS World Cup #4 in (France) Tignes
  - For results, click here.
- February 24 – 26: IPC AS World Cup #5 in (United States) Aspen Mountain
  - For results, click here.
- February 28 – March 4: IPC AS World Cup #6 (final) in (United States) Aspen Buttermilk
  - For results, click here.

=== Alpine Skiing FIS South American Cup ===
- August 7 – : Alpine Skiing FIS South American Cup 2015
  - August 7: FIS South American Cup #1 in (Argentina) Chapelco
    - Men's Giant Slalom winner: (Chile) Henrik von Appen
    - Women's Giant Slalom winner: (Slovakia) Barbara Kantorová
  - August 11 – 12: FIS South American Cup #2 in (Argentina) Cerro Catedral
    - Men's Slalom winner: (Argentina) Tomas Birkner De Miguel
    - Women's Slalom winner: (Argentina) Salomé Báncora
    - Men's Giant Slalom winner: (Argentina) Sebastiano Gastaldi
    - Women's Giant Slalom winner: (Chile) Noelle Barahona
  - August 15: FIS South American Cup #3 in (Chile) Antillanca
    - Men's Slalom winner: (Italy) Federico Vietti
    - Women's Slalom winner: (Slovakia) Barbara Kantorová
  - August 27: FIS South American Cup #4 in (Chile) Valle Nevado
    - Men's Super G winner: (Germany) Klaus Brandner
    - Women's Super G winner: (Chile) Noelle Barahona
  - August 29: FIS South American Cup #5 in (Chile) El Colorado
    - Men's Giant Slalom winner: (Norway) Aleksander Aamodt Kilde
    - Women's Giant Slalom winner: (Chile) Noelle Barahona
  - August 30 – September 4: FIS South American Cup #6 in (Chile) La Parva
    - Men's Slalom winner: (Slovenia) Štefan Hadalin
    - Women's Slalom winner: (Argentina) Salomé Báncora
    - Men's Downhill #1 winner: (France) Blaise Giezendanner
    - Men's Downhill #2 winner: (Slovenia) Boštjan Kline
    - Women's Downhill #1 winner: (Slovenia) Ilka Štuhec
    - Women's Downhill #2 winner: (Slovenia) Ilka Štuhec
    - Men's Super G winner: (Germany) Andreas Sander
    - Women's Super G winner: (Slovenia) Ilka Štuhec
  - September 14 – 16: FIS South American Cup #7 in (Chile) El Colorado
    - Men's Downhill (Downhill in two runs) winner: (Russia) Artem Borodaykin
    - Women's Downhill #1 winner: (Czech Republic) Ester Ledecká
    - Women's Downhill #2 winner: (Czech Republic) Ester Ledecká
    - Men's Super G #1 winner: (Germany) Josef Ferstl
    - Men's Alpine Combined #1 winner: (Russia) Pavel Trikhichev
    - Men's Super G #2 winner: (Germany) Klaus Brandner
    - Men's Alpine Combined #2 winner: (Russia) Pavel Trikhichev
    - Women's Alpine Combined #1 winner: (Czech Republic) Ester Ledecká
    - Women's Super G #1 winner: (Czech Republic) Ester Ledecká
    - Women's Alpine Combined #2 winner: (Czech Republic) Ester Ledecká
    - Women's Super G #2 winner: (Czech Republic) Ester Ledecká
  - September 21 – 24: FIS South American Cup #8 in (Argentina) Cerro Castor
    - Men's Giant Slalom winner: (Russia) Aleksander Andrienko
  - Women's Giant Slalom winner: (France) Coralie Frasse Sombet
  - Men's slalom winner: (Argentina) Cristian Javier Simari Birkner
  - Women's slalom winner: (Argentina) Salome Bancora

=== Alpine Skiing FIS Australian New Zealand Cup ===
- August 22 – : Alpine Skiing FIS Australian New Zealand Cup 2015
  - 22 – 26 August: FIS Australian New Zealand Cup #1 in (Australia) Perisher
    - Men's Slalom #1 winner: (United States) Robby Kelley
    - Women's Slalom #1 winner: (New Zealand) Piera Hudson
    - Men's Slalom #2 winner: (Slovakia) Adam Žampa
    - Women's Slalom #2 winner: (United States) Madison Lord
    - Men's Giant Slalom winner: (Slovakia) Adam Žampa
    - Women's Giant Slalom #1 winner: (New Zealand) Piera Hudson
    - Women's Giant Slalom #2 winner: (New Zealand) Eliza Grigg
  - 24 – 30 August: FIS Australian New Zealand Cup #2 in Coronet Peak
    - Men's Slalom winner: (Slovakia) Adam Žampa
    - Women's Slalom winner: (Austria) Katharina Truppe
    - Men's Giant Slalom winner: (Slovakia) Adam Žampa
    - Women's Giant Slalom winner: (Austria) Chiara Mair
  - 26 August – 2 September: FIS Australian New Zealand Cup #3 in Coronet Peak
    - Women's Giant Slalom #1 winner: (Norway) Mina Fürst Holtmann
    - Men's Slalom winner: (Austria) Marco Schwarz
    - Women's Slalom winner: (Norway) Mina Fürst Holtmann
    - Men's Giant Slalom #1 winner: (Austria) Christian Hirschbuehl
    - Men's Giant Slalom #2 winner: (Slovakia) Adam Žampa
  - 4 – 5 September: FIS Australian New Zealand Cup #4 in Treble Cone
    - Men's Slalom winner: (Poland) Michał Jasiczek
    - Women's Slalom winner: (United Kingdom) Charlotte Guest
    - Men's Giant Slalom winner: (Canada) Kevyn Read
    - Women's Giant Slalom winner: (Austria) Elisabeth Kappaurer

=== Grass Skiing World Championships ===
- September 2–5: Grass Skiing FIS World Championships 2015 in (Italy) Tambre (Non-Olympic Event)
  - Men's Grass Super G winner: (Italy) Mattia Arrigoni
  - Women's Grass Super G winner: (Slovakia) Barbara Míková
  - Men's Grass Super Combined winner: (Czech Republic) Jan Němec
  - Women's Grass Super Combined winner: (Slovakia) Barbara Míková
  - Men's Grass Slalom winner: (Austria) Michael Stocker
  - Women's Grass Slalom winner: (Japan) Chisaki Maeda
  - Men's Grass Giant Slalom winner: (Italy) Fausto Cerentin
  - Women's Grass Giant Slalom winner: (Slovakia) Barbara Míková

== Biathlon ==
=== International biathlon championships and Winter Youth Olympics ===
- January 26 – February 2: 2016 IBU Youth/Junior World Championships in (Romania) Cheile–Grădiștei (Brașov)
  - Norway and Russia won 4 gold medals each. Norway won the overall medal tally.
- February 14 – 21: 2016 Winter Youth Olympics in Lillehammer
  - Boy's 7.5 km Sprint winners: (gold) (France) Emilien Claude; (silver) (Norway) Sivert Guttorm Bakken; (bronze) (Russia) Egor Tutmin
  - Girl's 6 km Sprint winners: (gold) (Germany) Juliane Frühwirt; (silver) (Norway) Marthe Kråkstad Johansen; (bronze) (Kazakhstan) Arina Pantova
  - Boy's 10 km Pursuit winners: (gold) (Norway) Sivert Guttorm Bakken; (silver) (Russia) Egor Tutmin; (bronze) (Russia) Said Karimulla Khalili
  - Girl's 7.5 km Pursuit winners: (gold) (Ukraine) Khrystyna Dmytrenko; (silver) (Norway) Marthe Kråkstad Johansen; (bronze) (France) Lou Jeanmonnot-Laurent
  - Regular Mixed Relay winners: (gold) Norway; (silver) Germany; (bronze) Italy
  - Single Mixed Relay winners (debut event):
    - (gold) (China) ZHU Zhenyu and MENG Fanqi
    - (silver) (Norway) Fredrik Qvist Buchen-Johannessen and Marthe Krakstad Johansen
    - (bronze) (Russia) Egor Tutmin and Ekaterina Ponedelko
- February 22 – 28: 2016 IBU Open European Championships in Tyumen
  - Men's 10 km Sprint winner: (Russia) Evgeniy Garanichev
  - Women's 7.5 km Sprint winner: (Germany) Nadine Horchler
  - Men's 12.5 km Pursuit winner: (Russia) Anton Babikov
  - Women's 10 km Pursuit winner: (Belarus) Nadezhda Skardino
  - Men's 15 km Mass Start winner: (Germany) Florian Graf
  - Women's 12.5 km Mass Start winner: (Germany) Luise Kummer
  - Single Mixed Relay winners: Russia (Victoria Slivko, Anton Babikov)
  - Mixed 2x6+2x7.5 km Team Relay winners: Russia (Anastasia Zagoruiko, Olga Iakushova, Matvey Eliseev, Evgeniy Garanichev)
- March 2 – 13: Biathlon World Championships 2016 in Oslo–Holmenkollen
  - Men's 10 km Sprint winner: (France) Martin Fourcade
  - Women's 7.5 km Sprint winner: (Norway) Tiril Eckhoff
  - Men's 12.5 km Pursuit winner: (France) Martin Fourcade
  - Women's 10 km Pursuit winner: (Germany) Laura Dahlmeier
  - Men's 20 km Individual winner: (France) Martin Fourcade
  - Women's 15 km Individual winner: (France) Marie Dorin Habert
  - Men's 15 km Mass Start winner: (Norway) Johannes Thingnes Bø
  - Women's 12.5 km Mass Start winner: (France) Marie Dorin Habert
  - Men's 4x7.5 km Relay winner: Norway (Ole Einar Bjørndalen, Tarjei Bø, Johannes Thingnes Bø, Emil Hegle Svendsen)
  - Women's 4x6 km Relay winner: Norway (Synnøve Solemdal, Fanny Horn Birkeland, Tiril Eckhoff, Marte Olsbu)
  - Mixed 2x6+2x7.5 km Team Relay winners: France (Anaïs Bescond, Marie Dorin Habert, Quentin Fillon Maillet, Martin Fourcade)
- March 16 – 20: 2016 IBU Junior Open European Championships in (Slovenia) Pokljuka
  - Junior Men's 15 km Individual winner: (Belarus) Viktar Kryuko
  - Junior Women's 12.5 km Individual winner: (Ukraine) Anastasiya Merkushyna
  - Junior Men's 10 km Sprint winner: (Belarus) Viktar Kryuko
  - Junior Women's 7.5 km Sprint winner: (France) Lena Arnaud
  - Junior Men's 12.5 km Pursuit winner: (Germany) David Zobel
  - Junior Women's 10 km Pursuit winner: (France) Julia Simon

=== 2015–16 Biathlon World Cup ===
- November 30 – December 6, 2015: IBU World Cup #1 in (Sweden) Östersund
  - Men's 12.5 km Pursuit winner: (France) Martin Fourcade
  - Women's 10 km Pursuit winner: (Finland) Kaisa Mäkäräinen
  - Men's 10 km Sprint winner: (France) Martin Fourcade
  - Women's 7.5 km Sprint winner: (Czech Republic) Gabriela Soukalová
  - Men's 20 km Individual winner: (Norway) Ole Einar Bjørndalen
  - Women's 15 km Individual winner: (Italy) Dorothea Wierer
  - Mixed 2x6 km+2x7.5 km Team Relay winners: Norway (Fanny Horn Birkeland, Tiril Eckhoff, Johannes Thingnes Bø, Tarjei Bø)
  - Mixed Single Team Relay winners: Norway (Kaia Wøien Nicolaisen, Lars Helge Birkeland)
- December 7 – 13, 2015: IBU World Cup #2 in (Austria) Hochfilzen
  - Men's 10 km Sprint winner: (Germany) Simon Schempp
  - Women's 7.5 km Sprint winner: (Germany) Franziska Hildebrand
  - Men's 12.5 km Pursuit winner: (France) Martin Fourcade
  - Women's 10 km Pursuit winner: (Germany) Laura Dahlmeier
  - Men's 4x7.5 km Team Relay winners: Russia (Alexey Volkov, Evgeniy Garanichev, Dmitry Malyshko, Anton Shipulin)
  - Women's 4x6km Team Relay winners: Italy (Lisa Vittozzi, Karin Oberhofer, Federica Sanfilippo, Dorothea Wierer)
- December 14 – 20, 2015: IBU World Cup #3 in (Slovenia) Pokljuka
  - Men's 10 km Sprint winner: (Germany) Simon Schempp
  - Women's 7.5 km Sprint winner: (France) Marie Dorin Habert
  - Men's 12.5 km Pursuit winner: (Germany) Simon Schempp
  - Women's 10 km Pursuit winner: (Germany) Laura Dahlmeier
  - Men's 15 km Μass Start winner: (France) Jean-Guillaume Béatrix
  - Women's 12.5 km Μass Start winner: (Finland) Kaisa Mäkäräinen
- January 7 – 10: IBU World Cup #4 in (Germany) Ruhpolding #1
  - Men's 10 km Sprint winner: (Norway) Johannes Thingnes Bø
  - Women's 7.5 km Sprint winner: (Germany) Franziska Hildebrand
  - Men's 12.5 km Pursuit winner: (Austria) Simon Eder
  - Women's 10 km Pursuit winner: (Germany) Laura Dahlmeier
  - Men's 15 km Mass Start winner: (France) Martin Fourcade
  - Women's 12.5 km Mass Start winner: (Germany) Laura Dahlmeier
- January 12 – 17: IBU World Cup #5 in (Germany) Ruhpolding #2
  - Men's 20 km Individual winner: (France) Martin Fourcade
  - Women's 15 km Individual winner: (Italy) Dorothea Wierer
  - Men's 15 km Mass Start winner: (Germany) Erik Lesser
  - Women's 12.5 km Mass Start winner: (Czech Republic) Gabriela Soukalová
  - Men's 4x7.5 km Team Relay winners: Norway (Ole Einar Bjørndalen, Johannes Thingnes Bø, Tarjei Bø, Emil Hegle Svendsen)
  - Women's 4x6 km Team Relay winners: Ukraine (Iryna Varvynets, Yuliia Dzhima, Valj Semerenko, Olena Pidhrushna)
- January 20 – 24: IBU World Cup #6 in (Italy) Antholz-Anterselva
  - Men's 10 km Sprint winner: (Germany) Simon Schempp
  - Women's 7.5 km Sprint winner: (Russia) Olga Podchufarova
  - Men's 12.5 km Pursuit winner: (Russia) Anton Shipulin
  - Women's 10 km Pursuit winner: (Russia) Ekaterina Yurlova
  - Men's 4x7.5 km Team Relay winners: Russia (Maxim Tsvetkov, Evgeniy Garanichev, Dmitry Malyshko, Anton Shipulin)
  - Women's 4x6 km Team Relay winners: France (Justine Braisaz, Anaïs Bescond, Anaïs Chevalier, Marie Dorin Habert)
- February 1 – 7: IBU World Cup #7 in (Canada) Canmore, Alberta
  - Men's 10 km Sprint winner: (France) Martin Fourcade
  - Women's 7.5 km Sprint winner: (Ukraine) Olena Pidhrushna
  - Men's 15 km Mass Start winner: (Italy) Dominik Windisch
  - Women's 12.5 km Mass Start winner: (Italy) Dorothea Wierer
  - Mixed Single Team Relay winners: France (Marie Dorin Habert, Martin Fourcade)
  - Mixed 2x6 km+2x7.5 km Team Relay winners: Germany (Franziska Hildebrand, Franziska Preuß, Arnd Peiffer, Simon Schempp)
- February 8 – 14: IBU World Cup #8 in (United States) Presque Isle, Maine
  - Men's 10 km Sprint winner: (Norway) Johannes Thingnes Bø
  - Women's 7.5 km Sprint winner: (Czech Republic) Gabriela Soukalová
  - Men's 12.5 km Pursuit winner: (France) Martin Fourcade
  - Women's 10 km Pursuit winner: (Czech Republic) Gabriela Soukalová
  - Men's 4x7.5 km Team Relay winners: Norway (Lars Helge Birkeland, Erlend Bjoentegaard, Johannes Thingnes Bø, Tarjei Bø)
  - Women's 4x6 km Team Relay winners: Czech Republic (Eva Puskarčíková, Lucie Charvatova, Gabriela Soukalová, Veronika Vítková)
- March 16 – 20: IBU World Cup #9 (final) in (Russia) Khanty-Mansiysk
  - Note: Both men's and women's mass start events were cancelled.
  - Men's 10 km Sprint winner: (Austria) Julian Eberhard
  - Women's 7.5 km Sprint winner: (Finland) Kaisa Mäkäräinen
  - Men's 12.5 km Pursuit winner: (Germany) Simon Schempp
  - Women's 10 km Pursuit winner: (Finland) Kaisa Mäkäräinen

=== 2015–16 Winter IBU Cup ===
- November 27 – 29, 2015: Cup #1 in (Sweden) Idre
  - Men's 10 km Sprint #1 winner: (Russia) Petr Pashchenko
  - Men's 10 km Sprint #2 winner: (Russia) Matvey Eliseev
  - Women's 7.5 km Sprint #1 winner: (Poland) Magdalena Gwizdoń
  - Women's 7.5 km Sprint #2 winner: (Norway) Bente Landheim
- December 10 – 13, 2015: Cup #2 in (Italy) Ridnaun-Val Ridanna
  - Men's 10 km Sprint winner: (Russia) Anton Babikov
  - Women's 7.5 km Sprint winner: (Ukraine) Iryna Varvynets
  - Men's 12.5 Pursuit winner: (Russia) Anton Babikov
  - Women's 10 km Pursuit winner: (Russia) Galina Nechkasova
  - Mixed Single Team Relay winners: France (Anaïs Chevalier, Aristide Bègue)
  - Mixed 2x6 km+2x7.5 km Team Relay winners: Russia (Victoria Slivko, Uliana Kaisheva, Matvey Eliseev, Alexey Volkov)
- December 17 – 19, 2015: Cup #3 in (Austria) Obertilliach
  - Men's 20 km Individual winner: (Russia) Matvey Eliseev
  - Women's 15 km Individual winner: (Russia) Svetlana Sleptsova
  - Men's 10 km Sprint winner: (Russia) Timofey Lapshin
  - Women's 7.5 km Sprint winner: (Russia) Tatiana Akimova
- January 8 – 10: Cup #4 in (Czech Republic) Nové Město na Moravě
  - Men's 10 km Sprint #1 winner: (France) Fabien Claude
  - Men's 10 km Sprint #2 winner: (Russia) Petr Pashchenko
  - Women's 7.5 km Sprint #1 winner: (Russia) Olga Iakushova
  - Women's 7.5 km Sprint #2 winner: (France) Anaïs Chevalier
- January 13 – 17: Cup #5 in (Italy) Ridnaun–Val Ridanna
  - Men's 10 km Sprint winner: (Russia) Anton Babikov
  - Women's 7.5 km Sprint winner: (France) Coline Varcin
  - Men's 12.5 km Pursuit winner: (Russia) Alexey Slepov
  - Women's 10 km Pursuit winner: (Russia) Svetlana Sleptsova
  - Mixed 2x6km+2x7.5 km Team Relay winners: Ukraine (Yuliya Zhuravok, Nadiia Bielkina, Andriy Dotsenko, Artem Pryma)
- January 20 – 23: Cup #6 in (Germany) Großer Arber
  - Men's 10 km Sprint winner: (Russia) Matvey Eliseev
  - Women's 7.5 km Sprint winner: (Russia) Olga Iakushova
  - Men's 12.5 km Pursuit winner: (Russia) Yury Shopin
  - Women's 10 km Pursuit winner: (Russia) Olga Iakushova
  - Mixed Single Mixed Relay winners: Ukraine (Anastasiya Merkushyna, Artem Tyshchenko)
  - Mixed 2x6+2x7.5 km Team Relay winners: Ukraine (Nadiia Bielkina, Iana Bondar, Ruslan Tkalenko, Dmytro Rusinov)
- February 12 – 14: Cup #7 in (Slovakia) Brezno–Osrblie
  - Men's 20 km Individual winner: (Russia) Matvey Eliseev
  - Women's 15 km Individual winner: (France) Marine Bolliet
  - Men's 10 km Sprint winner: (Russia) Eduard Latypov
  - Women's 7.5 km Sprint winner: (Norway) Tiril Eckhoff
- March 9 – 13: Cup #8 (final) in (Italy) Martell-Val Martello
  - Men's 10 km Sprint #1 winner: (France) Antonin Guigonnat
  - Women's 7.5 km Sprint #1 winner: (France) Marine Bolliet
  - Men's 10 km Sprint #2 winner: (Russia) Alexey Slepov
  - Women's 7.5 km Sprint #2 winner: (Ukraine) Nadiia Bielkina
  - Mixed Single Mixed Relay winners: Russia (Galina Nechkasova, Yury Shopin)
  - Mixed 2x6+2x7.5 km Team Relay winners: Russia (Svetlana Sleptsova, Anna Shcherbinina, Semen Suchilov, Alexey Slepov)

=== 2015–16 IPC Biathlon World Cup ===
- December 2 – 9, 2015: IPC Biathlon World Cup #1 in (Russia) Tyumen
  - For results, click here.
- February 21 – 28: IPC Biathlon World Cup #2 in (Germany) Finsterau
  - For results, click here.
- March 15 – 20: IPC Biathlon World Cup #3 (final) in (Finland) Vuokatti
  - For results, click here.

== Cross-country skiing ==
=== 2016 Winter Youth Olympics (CCS) ===
- February 10 – 16: 1st World University Ski Orienteering Championship in (Russia) Tula
  - Sprint winners: (Bulgaria) Stanimir Belomazhev (m) / (Finland) Sonja Morsky (f)
  - Pursuit winners: (Bulgaria) Stanimir Belomazhev (m) / (Norway) Anna Ulvensoen (f)
  - Mass Start winners: (Bulgaria) Stanimir Belomazhev (m) / (Finland) Mira Kaskinen (f)
  - Mixed Relay winners: Norway (Jørgen Madslien, Anna Ulvensoen)
- February 13 – 18: 2016 Winter Youth Olympics in (Norway) Lillehammer
  - Boy's Sprint Classic winners: (gold) (Norway) Thomas Helland Larsen; (silver) (South Korea) Magnus Kim; (bronze) (Norway) Vebjørn Hegdal
  - Girl's Sprint Classic winners: (gold) (Sweden) Johanna Hagström; (silver) (Russia) Yuliya Petrova; (bronze) (Norway) Martine Engebretsen
  - Boy's 10 km Freestyle winners: (gold) (South Korea) Magnus Kim; (silver) (Norway) Vebjørn Hegdal; (bronze) (Russia) Igor Fedotov
  - Girl's 5 km Freestyle winners: (gold) (Russia) Maya Yakunina; (silver) (China) Chi Chunxue; (bronze) (Finland) Rebecca Immonen
  - Boy's XC Cross Freestyle winners (debut event): (gold) (South Korea) Magnus Kim; (silver) (Norway) Thomas Helland Larsen; (bronze) (Finland) Lauri Mannila
  - Girl's XC Cross Freestyle winners (debut event): (gold) (Sweden) Moa Lundgren; (silver) (Sweden) Johanna Hagström; (bronze) (France) Laura Chamiot Maitral
- February 22 – 28: 2016 FIS Nordic Junior World Ski Championships in (Romania) Râșnov
  - Men's U23 1.3 km Sprint Freestyle winner: (France) Lucas Chanavat
  - Men's Junior 1.3 km Sprint Freestyle winner: (Norway) Johannes Hoesflot Klaebo
  - Men's U23 15 km Classic winner: (Sweden) Jens Burman
  - Men's Junior 10 km Classic (Norway) Johannes Hoesflot Klaebo
  - Women's U23 1.3 km Sprint Freestyle winner: (Sweden) Jonna Sundling
  - Women's Junior 1.3 km Sprint Freestyle winner: (Norway) Amalie Håkonsen Ous
  - Women's U23 10 km Classic winner: (Russia) Anastasia Sedova
  - Women's Junior 5 km Classic winner: (Norway) Marte Mæhlum Johansen
  - Men's U23 15 km Free winner: (Norway) Simen Hegstad Krüger
  - Women's U23 10 km Free winner: (Germany) Victoria Carl
  - Men's Junior 15 km winner: (Russia) Ivan Yakimushkin
  - Women's Junior 10 km Free winner: (Sweden) Ebba Andersson
  - Men's 4 x 5 km Relay winners: Norway (Mattis Stenshagen, Vebjørn Hegdal, Jan Thomas Jenssen, Johannes Hoesflot Klaebo)
  - Women's 4 x 2.5 km Relay winners: Sweden (Emma Ribom, Elina Roennlund, Ebba Andersson, Jenny Solin)

=== 2016 Tour de Ski ===
- January 1 – 3: TdS #1 in (Switzerland) Lenzerheide
  - Men's Sprint Freestyle winner: (Italy) Federico Pellegrino
  - Women's Sprint Freestyle winner: (Norway) Maiken Caspersen Falla
  - Men's 30 km Classical Mass Start winner: (Norway) Martin Johnsrud Sundby
  - Women's 15 km Classical Mass Start winner: (Norway) Therese Johaug
  - Men's 10 km Freestyle Pursuit winner: (Norway) Martin Johnsrud Sundby
  - Women's 5 km Freestyle Pursuit winner: (Norway) Ingvild Flugstad Østberg
- January 5 & 6: TdS #2 in (Germany) Oberstdorf
  - Men's Sprint Classical winner: (Norway) Emil Iversen
  - Women's Sprint Classical winner: (United States) Sophie Caldwell
  - Men's 15 km Classical Mass Start winner: (Kazakhstan) Alexey Poltoranin
  - Women's 10 km Classical Mass Start winner: (Norway) Therese Johaug
- January 8: TdS #3 in (Italy) Toblach
  - Men's 10 km Freestyle winner: (Norway) Finn Hågen Krogh
  - Women's 5 km Freestyle winner: (United States) Jessie Diggins
- January 9 & 10: TdS #4 (final) in (Italy) Fiemme Valley
  - Men's 15 km Classical Mass Start winner: (Norway) Martin Johnsrud Sundby
  - Women's 10 km Classical Mass Start winner: (Norway) Heidi Weng
  - Men's 9 km Freestyle Pursuit winner: (Norway) Martin Johnsrud Sundby
  - Women's 9 km Freestyle Pursuit winner: (Norway) Therese Johaug

=== 2016 Ski Tour Canada ===
- Note: This tour makes its debut in this 2015–16 FIS Cross-Country skiing season.
- March 1: STC #1 in (Quebec) Gatineau
  - Men's Sprint Freestyle winner: (Russia) Sergey Ustiugov
  - Women's Sprint Freestyle winner: (Norway) Maiken Caspersen Falla
- March 2: STC #2 in (Quebec) Montreal
  - Men's 17.5 km Classical Mass Start winner: (Norway) Emil Iversen
  - Women's 10.5 km Classical Mass Start winner: (Norway) Therese Johaug
- March 4 & 5: STC #3 and #4 in Quebec City
  - Men's Sprint Freestyle winner: (France) Baptiste Gros
  - Women's Sprint Freestyle winner: (Sweden) Stina Nilsson
  - Men's 15 km Freestyle Pursuit winner: (Russia) Sergey Ustiugov
  - Women's 10 km Freestyle Pursuit winner: (Norway) Heidi Weng
- March 8 – 12: STC #5, #6, #7, and #8 (final) in Canmore, Alberta
  - Men's Sprint Classical winner: (Italy) Federico Pellegrino
  - Women's Sprint Classical winner: (Norway) Maiken Caspersen Falla
  - Men's Skiathlon winner: (Norway) Martin Johnsrud Sundby
  - Women's Skiathlon winner: (Norway) Heidi Weng
  - Men's 15 km Freestyle winner: (Finland) Matti Heikkinen
  - Women's 10 km Freestyle winner: (Norway) Ingvild Flugstad Østberg
  - Men's 15 km Classical Pursuit winner: (Norway) Martin Johnsrud Sundby
  - Women's 10 km Classical Pursuit winner: (Norway) Therese Johaug

=== 2015–16 FIS Cross-Country World Cup ===
- November 27 – 29, 2015: FIS CC World Cup #1 in (Finland) Rukatunturi, Kuusamo
  - Men's 15 km Classical Pursuit winner: (Norway) Martin Johnsrud Sundby
  - Women's 10 km Classical Pursuit winner: (Norway) Therese Johaug
  - Men's 10 km Freestyle winner: (Norway) Martin Johnsrud Sundby
  - Women's 5 km Freestyle winner: (Norway) Therese Johaug
  - Men's Sprint Classical winner: (Norway) Sondre Turvoll Fossli
  - Women's Sprint Classical winner: (Norway) Maiken Caspersen Falla
- December 5 & 6, 2015: FIS CC World Cup #2 in Lillehammer
  - Men's 30 km Skiathlon winner: (Norway) Martin Johnsrud Sundby
  - Women's 15 km Skiathlon winner: (Norway) Therese Johaug
  - Men's 4x7.5 km Team Relay winners: Norway (Niklas Dyrhaug, Hans Christer Holund, Martin Johnsrud Sundby, Petter Northug)
  - Women's 4x5 km Team Relay winners: Norway (Maiken Caspersen Falla, Ingvild Flugstad Østberg, Therese Johaug, Heidi Weng)
- December 12 & 13, 2015: FIS CC World Cup #3 in (Switzerland) Davos
  - Men's Sprint Freestyle winner: (Italy) Federico Pellegrino
  - Women's Sprint Freestyle winner: (Sweden) Stina Nilsson
  - Men's 30 km Freestyle winner: (Norway) Martin Johnsrud Sundby
  - Women's 15 km Freestyle winner: (Norway) Therese Johaug
- December 19 & 20, 2015: FIS CC World Cup #4 in (Italy) Toblach
  - Men's Sprint Freestyle: (Italy) Federico Pellegrino
  - Women's Sprint Freestyle: (Norway) Maiken Caspersen Falla
  - Men's 15 km Classical winner: (Norway) Martin Johnsrud Sundby
  - Women's 10 km Classical winner: (Norway) Therese Johaug
- January 16 & 17: FIS CC World Cup #5 in (Slovenia) Planica
  - Men's Sprint Freestyle: (Italy) Federico Pellegrino
  - Women's Sprint Freestyle winner: (Sweden) Stina Nilsson
  - Men's Team Sprint Freestyle winners: Italy (Dietmar Nöckler, Federico Pellegrino)
  - Women's Team Sprint Freestyle winners: Sweden (Ida Ingemarsdotter, Stina Nilsson)
- January 23 & 24: FIS CC World Cup #6 in (Czech Republic) Nové Město na Moravě
  - Men's 15 km Freestyle winner: (France) Maurice Manificat
  - Women's 10 km Freestyle winner: (Norway) Therese Johaug
  - Men's 4x7.5 km Team Relay winners: Norway (Sjur Røthe, Martin Johnsrud Sundby, Mathias Rundgreen, Finn Hågen Krogh)
  - Women's 4x5 km Team Relay winners: Norway (Ingvild Flugstad Østberg, Heidi Weng, Therese Johaug, Astrid Uhrenholdt Jacobsen)
- February 3: FIS CC World Cup #7 in (Norway) Drammen
  - Men's Sprint Classical winner: (Norway) Petter Northug
  - Women's Sprint Classical winner: (Norway) Maiken Caspersen Falla
- February 6 & 7: FIS CC World Cup #8 in (Norway) Oslo
  - Men's 50 km Classical Mass Start winner: (Norway) Martin Johnsrud Sundby
  - Women's 30 km Classical Mass Start winner: (Norway) Therese Johaug
- February 11: FIS CC World Cup #9 in (Sweden) Stockholm
  - Men's Sprint Classical winner: (Russia) Nikita Kriukov
  - Women's Sprint Classical winner: (Norway) Maiken Caspersen Falla
- February 13 & 14: FIS CC World Cup #10 in (Sweden) Falun
  - Men's 10 km Classical winner: (Russia) Maxim Vylegzhanin
  - Women's 5 km Classical winner: (Norway) Therese Johaug
  - Men's 15 km Freestyle Mass Start winner: (Russia) Sergey Ustiugov
  - Women's 10 km Freestyle Mass Start winner: (Norway) Therese Johaug
- February 20 & 21: FIS CC World Cup #11 (final) in (Finland) Lahti
  - Men's Sprint Freestyle winner: (Norway) Emil Iversen
  - Women's Sprint Freestyle winner: (Norway) Maiken Caspersen Falla
  - Men's Skiathlon winner: (Norway) Martin Johnsrud Sundby
  - Women's Skiathlon winner: (Norway) Therese Johaug

=== Australia/New Zealand Cup ===
- July 25 & 26: Australia/New Zealand Cup #1 in Perisher Valley
  - Men's 1 km Free winner: (Australia) Phillip Bellingham
  - Women's 1 km Free winner: (Slovenia) Barbara Jezeršek
  - Women's 5 km Cross winner: (Slovenia) Barbara Jezeršek
  - Men's 10 km Cross winner: (Australia) Callum Watson
- August 15 & 16: Australia/New Zealand Cup #2 in Falls Creek
  - Men's 1 km Free winner: (Australia) Phillip Bellingham
  - Women's 1 km Free winner: (Australia) Katerina Paul
  - Women's 10 km Free winner: (Slovenia) Barbara Jezeršek
  - Men's 15 km Free winner: (Australia) Phillip Bellingham
- August 28 – 30: Australia/New Zealand Cup #3 in Snow Farm
  - Women's SP Cross winner: (Canada) Olivia Bouffard-Nesbitt
  - Men's SP Cross winner: (South Korea) Eun-Ho Kim
  - Women's 10 km Cross winner: (South Korea) Lee Chae-won
  - Men's 15 km Cross winner: (South Korea) Hwang Jun-ho
  - Women's 5 km Free winner: (Slovenia) Barbara Jezeršek
  - Men's 10 km Free winner: (South Korea) Seong-Beom Park

=== Eastern Europe Cup 2015–2016 ===
- November 20–24, 2015: Eastern Europe Cup #1 in (Russia) Vershina Tei
  - Men's 10 km winner: (Russia) Nikita Stupak
  - Women's 5 km winner: (Russia) Olga Kuziukova
  - Men's 15 km winner: (Russia) Dmitriy Rostovtsev
  - Women's 10 km winner: (Russia) Elena Soboleva
- December 23–27, 2015: Eastern Europe Cup #2 in (Russia) Krasnogorsk
  - This events was cancelled
- January 14–17, 2016: Eastern Europe Cup #3 in (Belarus) Raubichi–Minsk
  - Men's 10 km winner: (Russia) Nikita Stupak
  - Women's 5 km winner: (Russia) Daria Vedenina
  - Women's 1.2 km Freestyle winner: (Russia) Elena Soboleva
  - Men's 1.2 km Freestyle winner: (Russia) Andrey Parfenov
  - Women's Skiatlon winner: (Russia) Daria Vedenina
  - Men's Skiatlon winner: (Russia) Andrey Melnichenko
- February 12: Eastern Europe Cup #4 in (Russia) Krasnogorsk
  - Men's 15 km winner: (Russia) Dmitry Japarov
  - Women's 10 km winner: (Russia) Anastasia Vlasova
- February 14: Eastern Europe Cup #5 in (Russia) Moscow
  - Women's 1.4 km Freestyle winner: (Russia) Olga Tsareva
  - Men's 1.2 km Freestyle winner: (Russia) Nikolay Morilov
- February 25 – 29: Eastern Europe Cup #6 (final) in (Russia) Syktyvkar
  - Men's 15 km Free winner: (Russia) Ivan Arteev
  - Women's 10 km Free winner: (Russia) Olga Rocheva
  - Men's 1.4 Sprint Classic winner: (Russia) Ermil Vokuev
  - Women's 1.4 Sprint Classic winner: (Russia) Elena Soboleva
  - Men's Skiathlon winner: (Russia) Petr Sedov
  - Women's Skiathlon winner: (Russia) Olga Rocheva

=== US Super Tour 2015–2016 ===
- November 24–28, 2015: US Super Tour #1 in (United States) West Yellowstone
  - Women's 10 km Freestyle winner: (United States) Katharine Ogden
  - Men's 15 km Freestyle winner: (United States) Brian Gregg
  - Men's 1.3 km Freestyle winner: (United States) Logan Hanneman
  - Women's 1.3 km Freestyle winner: (United States) Jennie Bender
- December 5 & 6, 2015: US Super Tour #2 in (United States) Copper Basin
  - Women's 10 km winner: (United States) Chelsea Holmes
  - Men's 15 km winner: (United States) Scott Patterson
  - Men's 1.3 km Classic winner: (United States) Dakota Blackhorse-von Jess
  - Women's 1.3 km Classic winner: (United States) Becca Rorabaugh
- January 30 & 31: US Super Tour #3 in (United States) Mt. Van Hoevenberg Olympic Bobsled Run
  - Men's 10 km Classic winner: (United States) David Norris
  - Women's 10 km Classic winner: (United States) Caitlin Patterson
  - Men's 1.4 km Freestyle winner: (United States) David Norris
  - Women's 1.4 km Freestyle winner: (United States) Kelsey Phinney
- February 6 & 7: US Super Tour #4 in (United States) Craftsbury
  - Men's 10 km Classic winner: (United States) Patrick Caldwell
  - Women's 10 km winner (United States) Annie Hart
  - Men's 10 km Freestyle winner: (United States) Kris Freeman
  - Women's 5 km Freestyle winner: (United States) Erika Flowers

=== Scandinavian Cup 2015–2016 ===
- December 11–13, 2015: Scandinavian Cup #1 in (Finland) Vuokatti
  - Women's 10 km Classics winner: (Sweden) Sofia Henriksson
  - Men's 15 km Classics winner: (Norway) Emil Iversen
  - Women's 1,2 km Sprint Freestyle winner: (Sweden) Maja Dahlqvist
  - Men's 1,2 km Sprint Freestyle winner: (Sweden) Oskar Svensson
  - Women's 10 km Freestyle winner: (Norway) Maria Strøm Nakstad
  - Men's 15 km Freestyle winner: (Norway) Martin Løwstrøm Nyenget
- January 8–10, 2016: Scandinavian Cup #2 in (Sweden) Östersund
  - Women's 10 km Freestyle winner: (Norway) Maria Strøm Nakstad
  - Men's 15 km Freestyle winner: (Norway) Per Kristian Nygård
  - Women's 20 km Classics winner: (Sweden) Sofia Henriksson
  - Men's 30 km Classics winner: (Norway) Mikael Gunnulfsen

=== North American Cup 2015–2016 ===
- December 5–8, 2015: North American Cup #1 in (Canada) Canmore
  - Women's 5 km Classics winner: (Canada) Sophie Carrier-Laforte
  - Men's 10 km Classics winner: (Canada) Kevin Sandau
  - Women's 10 km Freestyle Mass Start winner: (Canada) Dahria Beatty
  - Women's 15 km Freestyle Mass Start winner: (Canada) Kevin Sandau
  - Women's 1.5 km Classics winner: (Canada) Dahria Beatty
  - Men's 1.5 km Classics winner: (Canada) Bob Thompson
- December 12 & 13, 2015: North American Cup #2 in (Canada) Vernon
  - Women's 1,5 km Sprint Freestyle winner: (Canada) Maya MacIsaac-Jones
  - Men's 1,2 km Sprint Freestyle winner: (Canada) Andy Shields
  - Women's 10 km Freestyle winner: (Canada) Dahria Beatty
  - Men's 15 km Freestyle winner: (Canada) Kevin Sandau
- January 14 & 17, 2016: North American Cup #3 in (Canada) Kaministiquia
  - Women's 10 km Classics winner: (Canada) Andrea Dupont
  - Men's 15 km Classics winner: (Canada) Kevin Sandau
  - Women's 1,4 km Sprint Freestyle winner: (Canada) Andrea Dupont
  - Men's 1,4 km Sprint Freestyle winner: (Canada) Julien Locke
- January 30 & 31, 2016: North American Cup #4 in (Canada) Mont-Sainte-Anne
  - Men's 10 km Classics winner: (Canada) Bob Thompson
  - Women's 5 km Classics winner: (Canada) Cendrine Browne
  - Men's 15 km Freestyle Pursuit winner: (Canada) Andy Shields
  - Women's 10 km Freestyle Pursuit winner: (Canada) Cendrine Browne
- February 5 – 7, 2016: North American Cup #5 in (Canada) Nakkertok Nordic Ski Centre
  - Women's 1,4 km Sprint Freestyle winner: (Canada) Maya MacIsaac-Jones
  - Men's 1,5 km Sprint Freestyle winner: (Canada) Julien Locke
  - Women's 10 km Freestyle winner: (Canada) Cendrine Browne
  - Men's 15 km Freestyle winner: (Canada) Michael Somppi
  - Women's 15 km Classics winner: (Canada) Dahria Beatty
  - Men's 20 km Classics winner: (Canada) Andy Shields
- February 19 – 21, 2016: North American Cup #6 in (Canada) Otway Nordic Ski Centre
  - Women's 1.4 km Sprint Classic winner: (Canada) Dahria Beatty
  - Men's 1.5 km Sprint Classic winner: (Canada) Bob Thompson
  - Women's 7.5 km Free winner: (Canada) Dahria Beatty
  - Men's 10 km Free winner: (Canada) Kennedy Russell
  - Women's 15 km Classics winner: (Canada) Cendrine Browne
  - Men's 20 km Classics winner: (Canada) Evan Palmer-Charrette

=== Slavic Cup 2015–2016 ===
- December 12 & 13, 2015: Slavic Cup #1 in (Slovakia) Štrbské Pleso
  - Women's 1,4 km Sprint Freestyle winner: (Poland) Marcela Marcisz-Niemczycka
  - Men's 1.6 km Sprint Freestyle winner: (Czech Republic) Jan Barton
  - Women's 5 km Classics winner: (Poland) Marcela Marcisz-Niemczycka
  - Men's 10 km Classics winner: (Slovakia) Andrej Segeč
- January 9 & 10, 2016: Slavic Cup #2 in (Slovakia) Štrbské Pleso
  - Women's 5 km Classics winner: (Slovakia) Barbora Klementová
  - Men's 10 km Classics winner: (Slovakia) Peter Mlynár
  - Women's 10 km Freestyle winner: (Poland) Martyna Galewicz
  - Men's 15 km Freestyle winner: (Slovakia) Peter Mlynár
- February 13 & 14, 2016: Slavic Cup #3 in (Czech Republic) Harrachov
  - This event was cancelled
- February 27 & 28, 2016: Slavic Cup #4 in (Slovakia) Kremnica
  - Women's 1.3 km Freestyle winner: (Czech Republic) Sandra Schuetzova
  - Men's 1.5 km Freestyle winner: (Czech Republic) Dušan Kožíšek
  - Women's 10 km Classics winner: (Czech Republic) Sandra Schuetzova
  - Men's 15 km Classics winner: (Slovakia) Peter Mlynár

=== Alpen Cup 2015–2016 ===
- December 12 & 13, 2015: Alpen Cup #1 in (France) Prémanon
  - Women's 10 km Freestyle winner: (Austria) Nathalie Schwarz
  - Men's 15 km Freestyle winner: (Italy) Giandomenico Salvadori
  - Women's 10 km Classics winner: (Germany) Julia Belger
  - Men's 15 km Classics winner: (Russia) Alexander Bessmertnykh
- December 18 – 20, 2015: Alpen Cup #2 in (Austria) Hochfilzen
  - Women's 1.2 km Sprint free winner: (Germany) Anne Winkler
  - Men's 1.4 km Sprint free winner: (Russia) Nikita Kriukov
  - Women's 10 km Freestyle winner: (France) Coraline Hugue
  - Men's 15 km Freestyle winner: (Italy) Giandomenico Salvadori
  - Women's 10 km Classics winner: (France) Anouk Faivre-Picon
  - Men's 15 km Classics winner: (Russia) Yevgeny Dementyev
- January 8 – 10, 2016: Alpen Cup #3 in (Slovenia) Planica
  - Women's 10 km Classics winner: (Germany) Victoria Carl
  - Men's 15 km Classics winner: (France) Alexis Jeannerod
  - Women's 1.2 km Freestyle winner: (Germany) Antonia Fraebel
  - Men's 1.4 km Freestyle winner: (France) Baptiste Gros
  - Women's 10 km Freestyle winner: (Italy) Giulia Stuerz
  - Men's 15 km Freestyle winner: (France) Clément Parisse
- February 5 – 7: Alpen Cup #4 in (Switzerland) Campra
  - Men's 1,4 km Sprint Classic winner: (Italy) Giandomenico Salvadori
  - Women's 1,2 km Sprint Classic winner: (Switzerland) Tatjana Stiffler
  - Men's 15 km Freestyle winner: (Switzerland) Roman Furger
  - Women's 10 km Freestyle winner: (Germany) Monique Siegel
  - Men's 15 km Pursuit Classic winner: (Italy) Giandomenico Salvadori
  - Women's 10 km Pursuit Classic winner: (Germany) Laura Gimmler

=== Far East Cup 2015–2016 ===
- December 16 & 17, 2015: Far East Cup #1 in (South Korea) Alpensia Resort
  - Women's 5 km Classics winner: (Japan) Chisa Obayashi
  - Women's 5 km Freestyle winner: (Japan) Sumiko Ishigaki
  - Men's 7,5 km Classics winner: (Japan) Takanori Ebina
  - Men's 7,5 km Freestyle winner: (Japan) Takanori Ebina
- December 25 – 27, 2015: Far East Cup #2 in (Japan) Otoineppu
  - Women's 5 km Classics winner: (Japan) Masako Ishida
  - Men's 10 km Classics winner: (Japan) Keishin Yoshida
  - Women's 5 km Freestyle winner: (Japan) Masako Ishida
  - Men's 10 km Freestyle winner: (Japan) Jun Ishikawa
- January 6 – 8, 2016: Far East Cup #3 in (Japan) Sapporo
  - Women's 5 km Classics winner: (Japan) Yuki Kobayashi
  - Men's 10 km Classics winner: (Japan) Keishin Yoshida
  - Women's 10 km Freestyle winner: (Japan) Yuki Kobayashi
  - Men's 15 km Freestyle winner: (Japan) Akira Lenting
- January 26 & 27, 2016: Far East Cup #4 in (South Korea) Alpensia Resort
  - Women's 5 km Classics winner: (South Korea) Da-Som Han
  - Men's 10 km Classics winner: (Japan) Akira Lenting
  - Women's 10 km Freestyle winner: (South Korea) Hye-Ri Ju
  - Men's 15 km Classics winner: (Japan) Akira Lenting

=== Balkan Cup 2016 ===
- January 19 & 20: Balkan Cup #1 in (Turkey) Gerede
  - Women's 5 km Classic winner: (Croatia) Vedrana Malec
  - Men's 5 km Classic winner: (Romania) Paul Constantin Pepene
  - Women's 5 km Freestyle winner: (Croatia) Vedrana Malec
  - Women's 10 km Freestyle winner: (Romania) Paul Constantin Pepene
- January 26 & 27: Balkan Cup #2 in (Serbia) Zlatibor
  - Event cancelled
- February 6 & 7: Balkan Cup #3 in (Croatia) Ravna Gora
  - Event cancelled
- February 27 & 28: Balkan Cup #4 in (Greece) Pigadia
  - Event cancelled
- February 27 & 28: Balkan Cup #5 in (Croatia) Ravna Gora
  - Women's 5 km Freestyle winner: (Croatia) Vedrana Malec
  - Men's 10 km Freestyle winner: (Croatia) Krešimir Crnkovic
  - Women's 10 km Freestyle winner: (Croatia) Vedrana Malec
  - Men's 15 km Freestyle winner: (Croatia) Krešimir Crnkovic

=== 2015–16 IPC Cross-Country Skiing World Cup ===
- December 2 – 9, 2015: IPC CC World Cup #1 in (Russia) Tyumen
  - For results, click here.
- February 21 – 28: IPC CC World Cup #2 in (Germany) Finsterau
  - For results, click here.
- March 15 – 20: IPC CC World Cup #3 (final) in (Finland) Vuokatti
  - For results, click here.

== Freestyle skiing ==
=== 2016 Winter Youth Olympics (FS) ===
- February 14 – 20: 2016 Winter Youth Olympics in (Norway) Lillehammer
  - Boy's Halfpipe winners: (gold) (United States) Birk Irving; (silver) (New Zealand) Finn Bilous; (bronze) (Norway) Trym Sunde Andreassen
  - Boy's Slopestyle winners: (gold) (Norway) Birk Ruud; (silver) (United States) Alexander Hall; (bronze) (New Zealand) Finn Bilous
  - Boy's Ski Cross winners: (gold) (Canada) Reece Howden; (silver) (Belgium) Xander Vercammen; (bronze) (Australia) Louis Muhlen
  - Girl's Halfpipe winners: (gold) (United Kingdom) Madison Rowlands; (silver) (United States) Paula Cooper; (bronze) (Austria) Lara Wolf
  - Girl's Slopestyle winners: (gold) (Russia) Lana Prusakova; (silver) (France) Lou Barin; (bronze) (United Kingdom) Madison Rowlands
  - Girl's Ski Cross winners: (gold) (Switzerland) Talina Gantenbein; (silver) (Australia) Zali Offord; (bronze) (Czech Republic) Klára Kašparová

=== Mogul skiing and Aerials ===
- December 12, 2015: FIS MS&A World Cup #1 in (Finland) Rukatunturi, Kuusamo
  - Men's Dual Moguls winner: (Canada) Mikaël Kingsbury
  - Women's Dual Moguls winner: (United States) Mikaela Matthews
- December 19 & 20, 2015: FIS MS&A World Cup #2 in (China) Beijing
  - Men's Aerials #1 winner: (China) Qi Guangpu
  - Men's Aerials #2 winner: (Belarus) Maxim Gustik
  - Women's Aerials #1 winner: (United States) Ashley Caldwell
  - Women's Aerials #2 winner: (China) Kong Fanyu
- January 14 – 16: FIS MS&A World Cup #3 in (United States) Lake Placid, New York
  - Events cancelled.
- January 23: FIS MS&A World Cup #4 in (Canada) Val Saint-Côme, Quebec
  - Men's Moguls winner: (Canada) Mikaël Kingsbury
  - Women's Moguls winner: (Canada) Justine Dufour-Lapointe
- January 30: FIS MS&A World Cup #5 in (Canada) Calgary
  - Men's Moguls winner: (Canada) Mikaël Kingsbury
  - Women's Moguls winner: (Canada) Chloé Dufour-Lapointe
- February 4 – 6: FIS MS&A World Cup #6 in (United States) Deer Valley
  - Men's Aerials #1 winner: (China) Qi Guangpu
  - Men's Aerials #2 winner: (Russia) Petr Medulich
  - Women's Aerials #1 winner: (China) YANG Yu
  - Women's Aerials #2 winner: (China) Zhang Xin
  - Men's Moguls winner: (Australia) Matt Graham
  - Women's Moguls winner: (Canada) Justine Dufour-Lapointe
  - Men's Dual Moguls winner: (France) Anthony Benna
  - Women's Dual Moguls winner: (Canada) Justine Dufour-Lapointe
- February 13: FIS MS&A World Cup #7 in (Russia) Moscow #1
  - Men's Aerials winner: (United States) Mac Bohonnon
  - Women's Aerials winner: (Russia) Alina Gridneva
- February 20: FIS MS&A World Cup #8 in (Belarus) Minsk
  - Men's Aerials winner: (United States) Christopher Lillis
  - Women's Aerials winner: (United States) Ashley Caldwell
- February 27: FIS MS&A World Cup #9 in (Spain) Sierra Nevada Ski Station
  - Events cancelled.
- February 27 & 28: FIS MS&A World Cup #10 in (Japan) Lake Tazawa, Semboku, Akita
  - Men's Moguls winner: (United States) Bradley Wilson
  - Women's Moguls winner: (France) Perrine Laffont
  - Men's Dual Moguls winner: (Canada) Mikaël Kingsbury
  - Women's Dual Moguls winner: (Switzerland) Deborah Scanzio
- March 5: FIS MS&A World Cup #11 (final) in (Russia) Moscow #2
  - Men's Dual Moguls winner: (Canada) Mikaël Kingsbury
  - Women's Dual Moguls winner: (France) Perrine Laffont

=== Half-pipe skiing and Slopestyle ===
- August 21, 23, 27, and 29, 2015: FIS HP&S World Cup #1 in (New Zealand) Cardrona Alpine Resort
  - Men's Halfpipe winner: (France) Kevin Rolland
  - Women's Halfpipe winner: (United States) Devin Logan
  - Men's Slopestyle winner: (United Kingdom) James Woods
  - Women's Slopestyle winner: (Norway) Tiril Sjåstad Christiansen
- January 21 – 24: FIS HP&S World Cup #2 in (United States) Mammoth Mountain Ski Area
  - Men's Halfpipe winner: (United States) Gus Kenworthy
  - Women's Halfpipe winner: (Japan) Ayana Onozuka
  - Men's Slopestyle winner: (United States) Joss Christensen
  - Women's Slopestyle winner: (Canada) Yuki Tsubota
- February 3 & 5: FIS HP&S World Cup #3 in (United States) Park City Mountain Resort
  - Men's Halfpipe winner: (United States) Aaron Blunck
  - Women's Halfpipe winner: (United States) Maddie Bowman
- February 12: FIS HP&S World Cup #4 in (United States) Boston
  - Men's Big Air winner: (Canada) Vincent Gagnier
  - Women's Big Air winner: (Germany) Lisa Zimmermann
- February 18 & 20: FIS HP&S World Cup #5 in (South Korea) Bokwang Phoenix Park
  - Men's Slopestyle winner: (Canada) Alex Bellemare
  - Women's Slopestyle winner: (Norway) Tiril Sjåstad Christiansen
- March 3 & 4: FIS HP&S World Cup #6 in (Switzerland) Silvaplana
  - Men's Slopestyle winner: (Switzerland) Andri Ragettli
  - Women's Slopestyle winner: (Sweden) Emma Dahlström
- March 9 & 10: FIS HP&S World Cup #7 (final) in (France) Tignes
  - Men's Halfpipe winner: (France) Kevin Rolland
  - Women's Halfpipe winner: (United States) Maddie Bowman

=== Ski cross ===
- December 4 & 5, 2015: FIS SC World Cup #1 in (Austria) Montafon
  - Men's Ski Cross winner: (Canada) Christopher Del Bosco
  - Women's Ski Cross winner: (Canada) Marielle Thompson
- December 10 – 12, 2015: FIS SC World Cup #2 in (France) Val Thorens
  - Men's Ski Cross #1 winner: (Canada) Christopher Del Bosco
  - Men's Ski Cross #2 winner: (France) Jean-Frédéric Chapuis
  - Women's Ski Cross #1 winner: (Sweden) Anna Holmlund
  - Women's Ski Cross #2 winner: (Sweden) Anna Holmlund
- December 18 – 20, 2015: FIS SC World Cup #3 in (Italy) Innichen
  - Men's Ski Cross #1 winner: (France) Jean-Frédéric Chapuis
  - Men's Ski Cross #2 winner: (Sweden) Victor Öhling Norberg
  - Women's Ski Cross #1 winner: (Germany) Heidi Zacher
  - Women's Ski Cross #2 winner: (Austria) Andrea Limbacher
- January 9 & 10: FIS SC World Cup #4 in (Italy) Watles
  - Events cancelled.
- January 15 – 17: FIS SC World Cup #5 in (Italy) Watles
  - Note: This event was slated for La Plagne, but was cancelled and replaced with Watles.
  - Men's Ski Cross #1 winner: (France) Jean-Frédéric Chapuis
  - Men's Ski Cross #2 winner: (Switzerland) Jonas Lenherr
  - Women's Ski Cross #1 winner: (Sweden) Anna Holmlund
  - Women's Ski Cross #2 winner: (Canada) Marielle Thompson
- January 22 & 23: FIS SC World Cup #6 in (Canada) Nakiska
  - Men's Ski Cross winner: (France) Jean-Frédéric Chapuis
  - Women's Ski Cross winner: (Canada) Marielle Thompson
- February 12 – 14: FIS SC World Cup #7 in (Sweden) Idre
  - Men's Ski Cross #1 winner: (Slovenia) Filip Flisar
  - Men's Ski Cross #2 winner: (Sweden) Victor Öhling Norberg
  - Women's Ski Cross #1 winner: (Sweden) Anna Holmlund
  - Women's Ski Cross #2 winner: (Canada) Marielle Thompson
- February 19 – 21: FIS SC World Cup #8 in (Germany) Tegernsee
  - Events cancelled.
- February 26 & 28: FIS SC World Cup #9 in (South Korea) Bokwang Phoenix Park
  - Men's Ski Cross winner: (France) Bastien Midol
  - Women's Ski Cross winner: (Austria) Andrea Limbacher
- March 4: FIS SC World Cup #10 (final) in (Switzerland) Arosa
  - Men's Ski Cross winner: (Russia) Semen Denshchikov
  - Women's Ski Cross winner: (Sweden) Anna Holmlund
- March 11 & 13: FIS SC World Cup #11 in (United States) Squaw Valley Ski Resort
  - Events cancelled.

=== Europa Cup 2015–2016 ===
- November 21 & 22, 2015: FIS Europa Cup #1 in (Austria) Pitztal
  - Men's Ski Cross #1 winner: (Canada) Louis-Pierre Hélie
  - Men's Ski Cross #2 winner: (Canada) Kevin Drury
  - Women's Ski Cross #1 winner: (Canada) Kelsey Serwa
  - Women's Ski Cross #2 winner: (Canada) Kelsey Serwa
- November 28, 2015: FIS Europa Cup #2 in (Austria) Kaunertal
  - This stage was cancelled
- December 4 & 5, 2015: FIS Europa Cup #3 in (Finland) Rukatunturi
  - Men's Aerials #1 winner: (Canada) Olivier Rochon
  - Men's Aerials #2 winner: (Russia) Pavel Krotov
  - Women's Aerials #1 winner: (Russia) Alina Gridneva
  - Women's Aerials #2 winner: (Australia) Danielle Scott
- December 17 & 18, 2015: FIS Europa Cup #4 in (France) Val Thorens
  - Men's Ski Cross #1 winner: (Switzerland) Ryan Regez
  - Men's Ski Cross #2 winner: (Switzerland) Ryan Regez
  - Women's Ski Cross #1 winner: (Russia) Ekaterina Maltseva
  - Women's Ski Cross #2 winner: (Germany) Nina Kloe
- January 23 & 24, 2016: FIS Europa Cup #5 in (France) Albiez-Montrond
  - Men's Moguls winner: (Sweden) Walter Wallberg
  - Women's Moguls winner: (Switzerland) Nicole Gasparini
  - Men's Dual Moguls winner: (Sweden) Walter Wallberg
  - Women's Dual Moguls winner: (Switzerland) Nicole Gasparini
- January 28 & 29, 2016: FIS Europa Cup #7 in (France) Albiez-Montrond
  - Men's Moguls winner: (Sweden) Walter Wallberg
  - Women's Moguls winner: (Russia) Ksenia Kuznetsova
  - Men's Dual Moguls winner: (Kazakhstan) Dmitriy Barmashov
  - Women's Dual Moguls winner: (Russia) Anastasia Pervushina
- January 28 & 29, 2016: FIS Europa Cup #8 in (Switzerland) Lenk im Simmental
  - Men's Ski Cross #1 winner: (Austria) Adam Kappacher
  - Men's Ski Cross #2 winner: (Italy) Stefan Thanei
  - Women's Ski Cross #1 winner: (Switzerland) Katrin Müller
  - Women's Ski Cross #2 winner: (Switzerland) Katrin Müller
- January 29 – 31, 2016: FIS Europa Cup #9 in (Belarus) Minsk
  - Men's Ski Cross #1 winner: (Switzerland) Nicolas Gygax
  - Men's Ski Cross #2 winner: (Switzerland) Nicolas Gygax
  - Women's Ski Cross #1 winner: (Russia) Kristina Spiridonova
  - Women's Ski Cross #2 winner: (Kazakhstan) Zhanbota Aldabergenova
  - Men's Team winner: Russia (Radmir Gareev, Ruslan Katmanov, Kristina Spiridonova)
  - Women's Team winners: Switzerland
- February 4 & 5, 2016: FIS Europa Cup #10 in (Italy) Chiesa in Valmalenco
  - Men's Moguls #1 winner: (Sweden) Walter Wallberg
  - Men's Moguls #2 winner: (Russia) Sergey Volkov
  - Women's Moguls #1 winner: (Russia) Yelizaveta Bezgodova
  - Women's Moguls #2 winner: (Norway) Nora Lodoen
- February 4 – 6, 2016: FIS Europa Cup #11 in (France) Orcières
  - Men's Ski Cross #1 winner: (Canada) Tristan Tafel
  - Men's Ski Cross #2 winner: (Canada) Tristan Tafel
  - Women's Ski Cross #1 winner: (Russia) Yulia Livinskaya
  - Women's Ski Cross #2 winner: (Italy) Sabine Wolfsgruber
- February 12 – 13, 2016: FIS Europa Cup #12 in (Austria) Sankt Gallenkirch
  - Men's Moguls #1 winner: (Russia) Andrey Uglovski
  - Men's Moguls #2 winner: (Russia) Sergey Volkov
  - Women's Moguls #1 winner: (Austria) Melanie Meilinger
  - Women's Moguls #2 winner: (Switzerland) Nicole Gasparini
- February 27 – 28, 2016: FIS Europa Cup #13 in (Italy) Seiser Alm
  - Men's Slopestyle #1 winner: (Germany) Florian Preuss
  - Men's Slopestyle #2 winner: (New Zealand) Finn Bilous
  - Women's Slopestyle #1 winner: (Slovakia) Zuzana Stromková
  - Women's Slopestyle #2 winner: (Chile) Dominique Ohaco
- February 27 – 28, 2016: FIS Europa Cup #14 in (Germany) Grasgehren
  - Men's Ski Cross #1 winner: (Switzerland) Joos Berry
  - Men's Ski Cross #1 winner: (Germany) Florian Wilmsmann
  - Women's Ski Cross #1 winner: (Switzerland) Katrin Müller
  - Women's Ski Cross #2 winner: (Switzerland) Katrin Müller

=== North American Cup 2015–2016 ===
- December 18 & 19, 2015: North American Cup #1 in (United States) Utah Olympic Park
  - Men's Aerials #1 winner: (United States) Harrison Smith
  - Men's Aerials #1 winner: (United States) Christopher Lillis
  - Women's Aerials #1 winner: (United States) Tyra Izor
  - Women's Aerials #2 winner: (United States) Winter Vinecki
- January 15 – 17, 2016: North American Cup #2 in (Canada) Taber
  - Women's Ski Cross #1 winner: (Canada) Tiana Gairns
  - Women's Ski Cross #2 winner: (Canada) Tiana Gairns
  - Men's Ski Cross #1 winner: (Canada) Mathieu Leduc
  - Men's Ski Cross #2 winner: (Canada) Trent McCarthy
- January 25 – 27, 2016: North American Cup #3 in (Canada) Nakiska
  - Women's Ski Cross #1 winner: (Canada) Brittany Phelan
  - Women's Ski Cross #2 winner: (Canada) Brittany Phelan
  - Men's Ski Cross #1 winner: (Canada) Kris Mahler
  - Men's Ski Cross #2 winner: (Canada) Kevin Drury
- February 13 & 14, 2016: North American Cup #4 in (United States) Lake Placid, New York
  - Men's Aerials #1 winner: (Canada) Lewis Irving
  - Men's Aerials #2 winner: (United States) Justin Schoenefeld
  - Women's Aerials #1 winner: (Canada) Catrine Lavallee
  - Women's Aerials #2 winner: (Canada) Catrine Lavallee
- February 13 & 14, 2016: North American Cup #5 in Canada Olympic Park
  - Women's Moguls winner: (United States) Sophia Schwartz
  - Men's Moguls winner: (United States) Joel Hedrick
  - Women's Dual Moguls winner: (United States) Tess Johnson
  - Men's Dual Moguls winner: (United States) Emerson Smith
- February 17 – 21, 2016: North American Cup #6 in (United States) Ski Cooper
  - Men's Ski Cross #1 winner: (Canada) Zach Belczyk
  - Men's Ski Cross #2 winner: (Canada) Zach Belczyk
  - Women's ski Cross #1 winner: (United States) Mara White
  - Women's ski Cross #2 winner: (United States) Leah Emaus
- February 18 – 20, 2016: North American Cup #7 in (United States) Buttermilk
  - Men's Slopestyle winner: (United States) Ethan Swadburg
  - Women's Slopestyle winner: (United States) Nadia Gonzales
  - Men's Big Air winner: (Canada) Taylor Wilson
  - Women's Big Air here is cancelled
  - Men's Halfpipe winner: (New Zealand) Byron Wells
  - Women's Halfpipe winner: (United States) Carly Margulies
- February 20 & 21, 2016: North American Cup #8 in (United States) Park City Mountain Resort
  - Men's Moguls winner: (United States) Emerson Smith
  - Men's Dual Moguls winner: (United States) Joel Hedrick
  - Women's Moguls winner: (United States) Tess Johnson
  - Women's Dual Moguls winner: (Australia) Taylah O'Neill
- February 27 & 28, 2016: North American Cup #9 in (Canada) Val Saint-Côme
  - Men's Aerials #1 winner: (United States) Christopher Lillis
  - Men's Aerials #2 winner: (Canada) Lewis Irving
  - Women's Aerials #1 winner: (Canada) Catrine Lavallee
  - Women's Aerials #2 winner: (United States) Winter Vinecki
  - Men's Moguls winner: (United States) Troy Tully
  - Women's Moguls winner: (Canada) Julie Bergeron
  - Men's Dual Moguls winner: (United States) Emerson Smith
  - Women's Dual Moguls winner: (United States) Kaitlyn Harrell
- February 27 & 28, 2016: North American Cup #10 in Canada Olympic Park
  - Men's Halfpipe winner: (New Zealand) Nico Porteous
  - Men's Slopestyle winner: (New Zealand) Nico Porteous
  - Women's Halfpipe winner: (United States) Jamie Crane-Mauzy
  - Women's Slopestyle winner: (Canada) Elena Gaskell

=== Oceania Continental Cup ===
- July 25 & 26: Oceania Continental Cup #1 in (New Zealand) Cardrona Alpine Resort
  - Men's Slopestyle winner: (New Zealand) Beau-James Wells
  - Women's Slopestyle winner: (United States) Keri Herman
  - Men's Halfpipe winner: (New Zealand) Beau-James Wells
  - Women's Halfpipe winner: (United States) Keri Herman
- August 1 – 3: Oceania Continental Cup #2 in (Australia) Mount Hotham
  - Men's Ski Cross winner: (Australia) Anton Grimus
  - Women's Ski Cross winner: (Australia) Katya Crema
- September 1 & 2: Oceania Continental Cup #3 in (Australia) Mount Hotham
  - Women's Ski Cross winner: (Australia) Sami Kennedy-Sim
  - Men's Ski Cross winner: (Australia) Anton Grimus
  - Women's Ski Cross winner: (Canada) Kelsey Serwa
  - Men's Ski Cross winner: (Canada) Brady Leman
- September 1 & 2: Oceania Continental Cup #4 in (Australia) Perisher Ski Resort
  - Women's Moguls winner: (Australia) Britteny Cox
  - Men's Moguls winner: (Canada) Mikaël Kingsbury
  - Women's Moguls winner: (Japan) Junko Hoshino
  - Men's Moguls winner: (Canada) Mikaël Kingsbury
- September 5: Oceania Continental Cup #5 in (Australia) Mount Buller
  - Women's Dual Moguls winner: (Australia) Britteny Cox
  - Men's Dual Moguls winner: (France) Benjamin Cavet

=== South American Continental Cup ===
- August 30 – September 1: South American Continental Cup #1 in (Chile) Antillanca ski resort
  - Women's Ski Cross winner: (United States) Tania Prymak
  - Men's Ski Cross winner: (Russia) Sergey Ridzik
  - Women's Ski Cross winner: (United States) Tania Prymak
  - Women's Ski Cross winner: (Russia) Roman Ilin
- September 10 – 12: South American Continental Cup #2 in (Chile) El Colorado Ski Center
  - Men's Big Air winner: (Chile) Matías Muñoz
  - Women's Big Air winner: (Chile) Dominique Ohaco
  - Men's Big Air winner: (Chile) Vincent Haller

== Nordic combined ==
=== 2016 Winter Youth Olympics (NC) and World Championships ===
- February 16 & 20: 2016 Winter Youth Olympics in Lillehammer
  - Boy's individual winners: (gold) (Germany) Tim Kopp; (silver) (United States) Ben Loomis; (bronze) (Czech Republic) Ondřej Pažout
  - Nordic Mixed Team winners: (gold) Russia; (silver) Norway; (bronze) Germany
- February 22 – 28: 2016 FIS Nordic Junior World Ski Championships in (Romania) Râșnov
  - Men's individual #1 winner: (Austria) Bernhard Flaschberger
  - Men's individual #2 winner: (Czech Republic) Tomáš Portyk
  - Men's team winners: Austria (Florian Dagn, Noa Ian Mraz, Samuel Mraz, Bernhard Flaschberger)

=== 2015–16 FIS Nordic Combined World Cup ===
- August 29 & 30, 2015: FIS NC World Cup #1 in (Germany) Oberwiesenthal
  - Winner: (Germany) Eric Frenzel
  - Team winners: Austria (Harald Lemmerer & Bernhard Gruber)
- September 2, 2015: FIS NC World Cup #2 in (Austria) Tschagguns / Partenen
  - Winner: (Austria) Mario Seidl
- September 4 & 5, 2015: FIS NC World Cup #3 in (Germany) Oberstdorf
  - Winner #1: (Germany) Johannes Rydzek
  - Winner #2: (Germany) Fabian Rießle
- November 28 & 29, 2015: FIS NC World Cup #4 in (Finland) Rukatunturi, Kuusamo
  - Events cancelled.
- December 5 & 6, 2015: FIS NC World Cup #5 in (Norway) Lillehammer
  - Winner #1: (Germany) Fabian Rießle
  - Winner #2: (Norway) Magnus Krog
- December 19 & 20, 2015: FIS NC World Cup #6 in (Austria) Ramsau am Dachstein
  - Winner #1: (Norway) Magnus Moan
  - Winner #2: (Germany) Eric Frenzel
- January 2 & 3: FIS NC World Cup #7 in (Germany) Klingenthal
  - Events cancelled.
- January 23 & 24: FIS NC World Cup #8 in (France) Chaux-Neuve
  - Winner #1: (Germany) Eric Frenzel
  - Winner #2: (Germany) Fabian Rießle
- January 29 – 31: FIS NC World Cup #9 in (Austria) Seefeld in Tirol
  - Winner #1: (Germany) Eric Frenzel
  - Winner #2: (Germany) Eric Frenzel
  - Winner #3: (Germany) Eric Frenzel
- February 6: FIS NC World Cup #10 in (Norway) Oslo
  - Winner: (Norway) Jarl Magnus Riiber
- February 9 & 10: FIS NC World Cup #11 in (Norway) Trondheim
  - Winner #1: (Norway) Jørgen Graabak
  - Winner #2: (Germany) Eric Frenzel
- February 19 – 21: FIS NC World Cup #12 in (Finland) Lahti
  - Winner #1: (Germany) Eric Frenzel
  - Winner #2: (Germany) Fabian Rießle
  - Team winners: Germany (Johannes Rydzek, Fabian Rießle)
- February 23: FIS NC World Cup #13 in (Finland) Kuopio
  - Winner: (Germany) Johannes Rydzek
- February 26 – 28: FIS NC World Cup #14 in (Italy) Fiemme Valley
  - Winner #1: (Austria) Bernhard Gruber
  - Winner #2: (Norway) Magnus Krog
  - Team winners: Norway (Magnus Krog, Jørgen Graabak)
- March 4 – 6: FIS NC World Cup #15 (final) in (Germany) Schonach
  - Winner #1: (Germany) Eric Frenzel
  - Winner #2: (Norway) Jørgen Graabak
  - Team winners: Norway (Magnus Moan, Jan Schmid, Magnus Krog, Jørgen Graabak)

=== Nordic Combined FIS Continental Cup 2015–2016 ===
- December 11–13, 2015: FIS Continental Cup #1 in (United States) Soldier Hollow
  - Winner #1: (Austria) David Pommer
  - Winner #2: (Austria) David Pommer
  - Winner #3: (United States) Taylor Fletcher
- December 15–16: FIS Continental Cup #2 in (United States) Lake Placid
  - This stage was cancelled
- January 8–10: FIS Continental Cup #3 in (Norway) Hoeydalsmo
  - One event in this stage cancelled
  - Winner #2: (Norway) Espen Andersen
  - Winner #3: (Austria) Franz-Josef Rehrl
- January 15–17: FIS Continental Cup #4 in (Finland) Rukatunturi
  - Winner #1: (Finland) Ilkka Herola
  - Winner #2: (Finland) Ilkka Herola
- January 23 & 24: FIS Continental Cup #5 in (South Korea) Pyeongchang
  - Winner #1: (Austria) Harald Lemmerer
  - Winner #2: (Germany) Tobias Simon
- February 6 & 7: FIS Continental Cup #6 in (Slovenia) Planica
  - Winner #1: (Austria) Lukas Greiderer
  - Winner #2: (Austria) Bernhard Flaschberger
- February 13 & 14: FIS Continental Cup #7 in (Austria) Ramsau am Dachstein
  - Winner #1: (Germany) Vinzenz Geiger
  - Winner #2: (Germany) Vinzenz Geiger

=== Alpen Cup 2015–2016 ===
- August 10, 2015: Alpen Cup #1 in (Germany) Klingenthal
  - Women's Individual winner: (Austria) Lisa Eder
- September 12 & 13, 2015: Alpen Cup #2 in (Germany) Winterberg
  - Men's Individual winner: (Germany) Vinzenz Geiger
  - Men's Individual winner: (Germany) Terence Weber
- September 26 & 27, 2015: Alpen Cup #3 in (Germany) Hinterzarten
  - Men's Individual winner: (France) Laurent Muhlethaler
  - Men's Individual winner: (France) Laurent Muhlethaler
- December 19 & 20, 2015: Alpen Cup #4 in (Austria) Seefeld in Tirol
  - Men's Individual winner (Germany) Vinzenz Geiger
- December 19 & 20, 2015: Alpen Cup #5 in (Austria) Villach
  - Events for this stage cancelled
- January 15 & 17, 2016: Alpen Cup #4 in (Germany) Oberwiesenthal
  - Men's Individual winner (Germany) Anton Schlütter
  - Men's Individual winner (Austria) Stefan Hauser
- February 13 & 14, 2016: Alpen Cup #5 in (Slovenia) Planica
  - Men's Individual winner (Austria) Mika Vermeulen
  - Men's Individual winner (France) Laurent Muhlethaler

== Ski jumping ==
=== 2016 Winter Youth Olympics (SJ) and World Championships ===
- February 16 – 18: 2016 Winter Youth Olympics in (Norway) Lillehammer
  - Boy's winners: (gold) (Slovenia) Bor Pavlovčič; (silver) (Norway) Marius Lindvik; (bronze) (Germany) Jonathan Siegel
  - Girl's winners: (gold) (Slovenia) Ema Klinec; (silver) (Russia) Sofia Tikhonova; (bronze) (Italy) Lara Malsiner
  - Mixed Team winners: (gold) Slovenia; (silver) Germany; (bronze) Austria
- February 22 – 28: FIS Nordic Junior World Ski Championships in (Romania) Râșnov
  - Men's Individual winner: (Germany) David Siegel
  - Women's Individual winner: (Austria) Chiara Hölzl
  - Men's Team winners: Germany (Jonathan Siegel, Adrian Sell, Tim Fuchs, David Siegel)
  - Mixed Team winners: Slovenia (Nika Križnar, Bor Pavlovčič, Ema Klinec, Domen Prevc)

=== 2015–16 Four Hills Tournament ===
- December 28 & 29, 2015: FHT #1 in (Germany) Oberstdorf
  - Men's individual winner: (Germany) Severin Freund
- December 31, 2015 & January 1, 2016: FHT #2 in (Germany) Garmisch-Partenkirchen
  - Men's individual winner: (Slovenia) Peter Prevc
- January 2 & 3: FHT #3 in (Austria) Innsbruck
  - Men's individual winner: (Slovenia) Peter Prevc
- January 5 & 6: FHT #4 (final) in (Austria) Bischofshofen
  - Men's individual winner: (Slovenia) Peter Prevc

=== FIS Ski Flying World Championships ===
- January 14 – 17: FIS Ski Flying World Championships 2016 in (Austria) Tauplitz–Bad Mitterndorf
  - Men's individual winner: (Slovenia) Peter Prevc
  - Men's Team Flying Hill winners: Norway (Anders Fannemel, Johann André Forfang, Daniel-André Tande, Kenneth Gangnes)

=== 2015–16 FIS Ski Jumping World Cup ===
- July
  - July 30 – August 1, 2015: FIS SJ World Cup #1 in Wisła #1
    - Men's individual winner: (Poland) Dawid Kubacki
    - Men's team winners: Poland (Maciej Kot, Piotr Żyła, Dawid Kubacki, Kamil Stoch)
- August
  - August 6 – 8, 2015: FIS SJ World Cup #2 in Hinterzarten
    - Men's individual winner: (Poland) Dawid Kubacki
    - Men's team winners: Germany (Severin Freund, Stephan Leyhe, Andreas Wellinger, Andreas Wank)
  - August 13 & 14, 2015: FIS SJ World Cup #3 in (France) Courchevel
    - Men's individual winner: (Germany) Severin Freund
    - Women's individual winner: (Japan) Sara Takanashi
  - August 15, 2015: FIS SJ World Cup #4 in (Switzerland) Einsiedeln
    - Men's individual winner: (Germany) Severin Freund
  - August 28 – 30, 2015: FIS SJ World Cup #5 in (Japan) Hakuba, Nagano
    - Men's individual winner #1: (Germany) Michael Neumayer
    - Men's individual winner #2: (Japan) Kento Sakuyama
- September
  - September 4 – 6, 2015: FIS SJ World Cup #6 in (Russia) Chaykovsky, Perm Krai
    - Men's individual winner #1: (Norway) Kenneth Gangnes
    - Men's individual winner #2: (Norway) Kenneth Gangnes
    - Women's individual winner #1: (Japan) Sara Takanashi
    - Women's individual winner #2: (Japan) Sara Takanashi
  - September 11 – 13, 2015: FIS SJ World Cup #7 in (Kazakhstan) Almaty
    - Men's individual winner #1: (Austria) Stefan Kraft
    - Men's individual winner #2: (Japan) Junshirō Kobayashi
    - Women's individual winner #1: (Japan) Sara Takanashi
    - Women's individual winner #2: (Japan) Sara Takanashi
  - September 26 & 27, 2015: FIS SJ World Cup #8 in (Austria) Hinzenbach #1
    - Men's individual winner: (Austria) Gregor Schlierenzauer
- November
  - Note: The training and qualification events on November 20 were postponed to November 21.
  - November 21 & 22, 2015: FIS SJ World Cup #9 in Klingenthal
    - Men's team winners: Germany (Andreas Wellinger, Andreas Wank, Richard Freitag, Severin Freund)
    - Men's individual winner: (Norway) Daniel-André Tande
  - November 26 – 28, 2015: FIS SJ World Cup #10 in (Finland) Rukatunturi, Kuusamo
    - Events canceled, due to windy conditions.
- December
  - December 4 – 6, 2015: FIS SJ World Cup #11 in (Norway) Lillehammer
    - Men's individual winner #1: (Germany) Severin Freund
    - Men's individual winner #2: (Norway) Kenneth Gangnes
    - Women's individual winner: (Japan) Sara Takanashi
  - December 11 – 13, 2015: FIS SJ World Cup #12 in (Russia) Nizhny Tagil
    - Men's individual #1 winner: (Germany) Severin Freund
    - Men's individual #2 winner: (Slovenia) Peter Prevc
    - Women's individual #1 winner: (Japan) Sara Takanashi
    - Women's individual #2 winner: (Austria) Daniela Iraschko-Stolz
  - December 18 – 20, 2015: FIS SJ World Cup #13 in (Switzerland) Engelberg
    - Men's individual #1 winner: (Slovenia) Peter Prevc
    - Men's individual #2 winner: (Slovenia) Peter Prevc
- January
  - January 8 – 10: FIS SJ World Cup #14 in Willingen
    - Men's individual winner: (Slovenia) Peter Prevc
    - Men's team winners: Germany (Andreas Wellinger, Andreas Wank, Richard Freitag, Severin Freund)
  - January 16 & 17: FIS SJ World Cup #15 in (Japan) Sapporo #1
    - Women's individual winner #1: (Japan) Sara Takanashi
    - Women's individual winner #2: (Japan) Sara Takanashi
  - January 22 & 23: FIS SJ World Cup #16 in (Japan) Zaō, Miyagi
    - Women's individual winner #1: (Japan) Sara Takanashi
    - Women's individual winner #2: (Japan) Sara Takanashi
  - January 22 – 24: FIS SJ World Cup #17 in (Poland) Zakopane
    - Men's individual winner: (Austria) Stefan Kraft
    - Men's team winners: Norway (Anders Fannemel, Andreas Stjernen, Daniel-André Tande, Kenneth Gangnes)
  - January 29 – 31: FIS SJ World Cup #18 in (Japan) Sapporo #2
    - Men's individual winner #1: (Slovenia) Peter Prevc
    - Men's individual winner #2: (Norway) Anders Fannemel
  - January 30 & 31: FIS SJ World Cup #19 in (Germany) Oberstdorf
    - Women's individual winner #1: (Japan) Sara Takanashi
    - Women's individual winner #2: (Japan) Sara Takanashi
- February
  - February 4 – 7: FIS SJ World Cup #20 in (Norway) Oslo
    - Note: Men's individual event was cancelled.
    - Men's team winners: Slovenia (Jurij Tepeš, Domen Prevc, Robert Kranjec, Peter Prevc)
    - Women's individual winner: (Japan) Sara Takanashi
  - February 6 & 7: FIS SJ World Cup #21 in (Austria) Hinzenbach #2
    - Women's individual winner #1: (Japan) Sara Takanashi
    - Women's individual winner #2: (Japan) Sara Takanashi
  - February 9 & 10: FIS SJ World Cup #22 in (Norway) Trondheim
    - Men's individual winner: (Slovenia) Peter Prevc
  - February 12 – 14: FIS SJ World Cup #23 in (Norway) Vikersund
    - Men's individual winner #1: (Slovenia) Robert Kranjec
    - Men's individual winner #2: (Slovenia) Peter Prevc
    - Men's individual winner #3: (Slovenia) Peter Prevc
  - February 13 & 14: FIS SJ World Cup #24 in (Slovenia) Ljubno ob Savinji
    - Women's individual winner #1: (Slovenia) Maja Vtič
    - Women's individual winner #2: (Austria) Daniela Iraschko-Stolz
  - February 19 – 21: FIS SJ World Cup #25 in (Finland) Lahti
    - Note: The Men's Team event here cancelled.
    - Men's individual winner #1: (Austria) Michael Hayböck
    - Men's individual winner #2: (Austria) Michael Hayböck
    - Women's individual winner: (Japan) Sara Takanashi
  - February 22 & 23: FIS SJ World Cup #26 in (Finland) Kuopio
    - Men's individual winner: (Austria) Michael Hayböck
    - Men's team winners: Norway (Kenneth Gangnes, Daniel-André Tande, Anders Fannemel, Johann André Forfang)
  - February 26 – 28: FIS SJ World Cup #27 in (Kazakhstan) Almaty
    - Men's individual winner #1: (Slovenia) Peter Prevc
    - Men's individual winner #2: (Slovenia) Peter Prevc
    - Women's individual winner #1: (Japan) Sara Takanashi
    - Women's individual winner #2: (Japan) Sara Takanashi
- March
  - March 3 – 5: FIS SJ World Cup #28 in (Poland) Wisła #2
    - Note: The second men's individual event was cancelled.
    - Men's individual winner: (Czech Republic) Roman Koudelka
  - March 5 & 6: FIS SJ World Cup #29 in (Romania) Râșnov
    - Events cancelled.
  - March 11 – 13: FIS SJ World Cup #30 in (Germany) Titisee-Neustadt
    - Note: The second men's individual event was cancelled.
    - Men's individual winner: (Norway) Johann André Forfang
  - March 17 – 20: FIS SJ World Cup #31 (final) in (Slovenia) Planica
    - Men's individual winner #1: (Slovenia) Peter Prevc
    - Men's individual winner #2: (Slovenia) Robert Kranjec
    - Men's individual winner #3: (Slovenia) Peter Prevc
    - Men's team winners: Norway (Daniel-André Tande, Anders Fannemel, Kenneth Gangnes, Johann André Forfang)

=== 2015–16 FIS Ski Jumping Continental Cup ===
==== Summer ====
- July 4 – 5: FIS Continental Cup #1 in (Slovenia) Kranj
  - Men's Individual winner: (Poland) Dawid Kubacki
  - Men's Individual winner: (Poland) Dawid Kubacki
- August 8 – 9: FIS Continental Cup #2 in (Poland) Wisla
  - Men's Individual winner: (Norway) Joacim Ødegård Bjøreng
  - Men's Individual winner: (Poland) Klemens Murańka
- August 22 – 23: FIS Continental Cup #3 in (Finland) Kuopio
  - Men's Individual winner: (Austria) Florian Altenburger
  - Men's Individual winner: (Slovenia) Andraž Pograjc
- August 28 – 29: FIS Continental Cup #4 in (Germany) Oberwiesenthal
  - Women's Individual winner: (Slovenia) Ema Klinec
  - Women's Individual winner: (Japan) Sara Takanashi
- August 28 – 29: FIS Continental Cup #5 in (Czech Republic) Frenštát pod Radhoštěm
  - Men's Individual winner: (Poland) Klemens Murańka
  - Men's Individual winner: (Austria) Clemens Aigner
- September 12 – 13: FIS Continental Cup #6 in (Austria) Stams
  - Men's Individual winner: (Norway) Daniel-André Tande
  - Men's Individual winner: (Norway) Daniel-André Tande
- September 19 – 20: FIS Continental Cup #7 in (Norway) Oslo
  - Women's Individual winner: (Norway) Maren Lundby
  - Men's Individual winner: (Norway) Halvor Egner Granerud
  - Women's Individual winner: (Norway) Line Jahr
  - Men's Individual winner: (Norway) Daniel-André Tande
- October 3 – 4: FIS Continental Cup #8 in (Germany) Klingenthal
  - Men's Individual winner: (Norway) Daniel-André Tande
  - Men's Individual winner: (Slovenia) Domen Prevc

==== Winter ====
- December 11 – 12: FIS Continental Cup #1 in (Norway) Notodden
  - Women's Individual winner: (Switzerland) Sabrina Windmüller
  - Women's Individual winner: (Switzerland) Sabrina Windmüller
- December 11 – 13: FIS Continental Cup #2 in (Norway) Rena
  - Men's Individual winner: (Poland) Andrzej Stękała
  - Men's Individual winner: (Slovenia) Tilen Bartol
  - Men's Individual winner: (Slovenia) Tilen Bartol
- December 19 & 20, 2015: FIS Continental Cup #3 in (Finland) Rovaniemi
  - Men's Individual winner: (Germany) Karl Geiger
  - Men's Individual winner: (Germany) David Siegel
- December 27 & 28: FIS Continental Cup #4 in (Switzerland) Engelberg
  - Men's Individual winner: (Austria) Clemens Aigner
  - Men's Individual winner: (Norway) Tom Hilde
- January 9 & 10: FIS Continental Cup #5 in (Germany) Garmisch-Partenkirchen
  - Men's Individual winner: (Germany) David Siegel
  - Men's Individual winner: (Austria) Thomas Hofer
- January 16 & 17: FIS Continental Cup #6 in (Germany) Willingen
  - Men's Individual winner: (Austria) Florian Altenburger
  - Men's Individual winner: (Austria) Thomas Hofer
- January 22 – 24: FIS Continental Cup #7 in (Japan) Sapporo
  - Men's Individual winner: (Czech Republic) Tomáš Vančura
  - Men's Individual winner: (Norway) Tom Hilde
  - Men's Individual winner: (Slovenia) Jaka Hvala
- January 30 & 31: FIS Continental Cup #8 in (Austria) Bischofshofen
  - Men's Individual winner: (Germany) Karl Geiger
  - Men's Individual winner: (Germany) Markus Eisenbichler
- February 6 & 7: FIS Continental Cup #9 in (Slovenia) Planica
  - Men's Individual winner: (Austria) Philipp Aschenwald
  - Men's Individual winner: (Austria) Philipp Aschenwald
- February 13 & 14: FIS Continental Cup #10 in (Poland) Zakopane
  - Men's Individual winner: (Austria) Ulrich Wohlgenannt
  - Men's Individual winner: (Austria) Ulrich Wohlgenannt
- February 20 & 21: FIS Continental Cup #11 in (United States) Iron Mountain
  - Men's Individual winner: (United States) Mike Glasder
  - Men's Individual winner: (Austria) Florian Altenburger
- February 27 & 28: FIS Continental Cup #12 in (Germany) Brotterode
  - Men's Individual winner: (Poland) Bartłomiej Kłusek
  - Men's Individual winner:

=== Alpen Cup 2015–2016 ===
- December 19 & 20, 2015: Alpen Cup #1 in (Austria) Seefeld in Tirol
  - Men's Individual winner: (Slovenia) Timi Zajc
  - Men's Individual winner: (Germany) Jonathan Siegel
- December 19 & 20, 2015: Alpen Cup #2 in (Austria) Villach
  - Events for this stage cancelled
- January 9 & 10, 2016: Alpen Cup #3 in (Slovenia) Žiri
  - Women's Individual winner: (Italy) Lara Malsiner
  - Women's Individual winner: (Slovenia) Nika Križnar
- January 15 & 17, 2016: Alpen Cup #4 in (Germany) Oberwiesenthal
  - Men's winner #1: (Germany) Jonathan Siegel
  - Men's winner #2: (France) Paul Brasme
  - Women's winner #1: (Germany) Pauline Heßler
  - Women's winner #2: (Germany) Agnes Reisch
- February 13 & 14, 2016: Alpen Cup #5 in (Slovenia) Planica
  - Men's Individual winner: (Austria) Janni Reisenauer
  - Men's Individual winner: (Austria) Janni Reisenauer

== Snowboarding ==
=== 2016 Winter Youth Olympics (SB) ===
- February 14 – 20: 2016 Winter Youth Olympics in (Norway) Lillehammer
  - Boy's Halfpipe winners: (gold) (United States) Jake Pates; (silver) (United States) Nikolas Baden; (bronze) (Slovenia) Tit Štante
  - Boy's Slopestyle winners: (gold) (United States) Jake Pates; (silver) (Russia) Vlad Khadarin; (bronze) (Finland) Rene Rinnekangas
  - Boy's Snowboard Cross winners: (gold) (United States) Jake Vedder; (silver) (Australia) Alex Dickson; (bronze) (Germany) Sebastian Pietrzykowski
  - Girl's Halfpipe winners: (gold) (United States) Chloe Kim; (silver) (Australia) Emily Arthur; (bronze) (South Korea) JEONG Yu-rim
  - Girl's Slopestyle winners: (gold) (United States) Chloe Kim; (silver) (Finland) Elli Pikkujamsa; (bronze) (Finland) Henna Ikola
  - Girl's Snowboard Cross winners: (gold) (France) Manon Petit; (silver) (Switzerland) Sophie Hediger; (bronze) (Italy) Caterina Carpano
  - Team Snowboard Ski Cross winners: (gold) Germany; (silver) Switzerland; (bronze) (International Olympic Committee) Mixed-NOCs (Team 4)

=== Alpine snowboarding ===
- December 12, 2015: FIS ASB World Cup #1 in (Italy) Carezza Dolomites
  - Men's Parallel Giant Slalom winner: (Bulgaria) Radoslav Yankov
  - Women's Parallel Giant Slalom winner: (Czech Republic) Ester Ledecká
- December 19, 2015: FIS ASB World Cup #2 in (Italy) Cortina d'Ampezzo
  - Men's Parallel Slalom winner: (Italy) Christoph Mick
  - Women's Parallel Slalom winner: (Switzerland) Patrizia Kummer
- January 8 & 9: FIS ASB World Cup #3 in Bad Gastein
  - Men's Parallel Slalom winner: (Bulgaria) Radoslav Yankov
  - Women's Parallel Slalom winner: (Russia) Yekaterina Tudegesheva
  - Mixed Team Parallel Slalom winners: Austria (Sabine Schöffmann, Alexander Payer)
- January 23: FIS ASB World Cup #4 in (Slovenia) Rogla Ski Resort
  - Men's Parallel Giant Slalom winner: (Russia) Andrey Sobolev
  - Women's Parallel Giant Slalom winner: (Czech Republic) Ester Ledecká
- January 30: FIS ASB World Cup #5 in (Russia) Moscow
  - Men's Parallel Slalom winner: (Italy) Roland Fischnaller
  - Women's Parallel Slalom winner: (Switzerland) Patrizia Kummer
- February 13: FIS ASB World Cup #6 in (Austria) Maria Laach am Jauerling
  - Events cancelled.
- February 27: FIS ASB World Cup #7 in (Turkey) Kayseri
  - Men's Parallel Giant Slalom winner: (Austria) Andreas Prommegger
  - Women's Parallel Giant Slalom winner: (Czech Republic) Ester Ledecká
- March 6: FIS ASB World Cup #8 (final) in (Germany) Winterberg
  - Men's Parallel Slalom winner: (Italy) Edwin Coratti
  - Women's Parallel Slalom winner: (Russia) Alena Zavarzina

=== Snowboard cross ===
- December 11 – 13, 2015: FIS SBC World Cup #1 in (Austria) Montafon
  - Men's Snowboard Cross winner: (Austria) Alessandro Hämmerle
  - Women's Snowboard Cross winner: (France) Nelly Moenne Loccoz
  - Men's Team Snowboard Cross winners: France (Pierre Vaultier, Tony Ramoin)
  - Women's Team Snowboard Cross winners: France (Nelly Moenne Loccoz, Chloé Trespeuch)
- December 19, 2015: FIS SBC World Cup #2 in (Italy) Cortina d'Ampezzo
  - Events cancelled.
- January 22 – 24: FIS SBC World Cup #3 in (Germany) Feldberg
  - Men's Snowboard Cross #1 winner: (Russia) Nikolay Olyunin
  - Women's Snowboard Cross #1 winner: (Czech Republic) Eva Samková
  - Men's Snowboard Cross #2 winner: (France) Pierre Vaultier
  - Women's Snowboard Cross #2 winner: (France) Nelly Moenne Loccoz
- February 20 & 21: FIS SBC World Cup #4 in (Russia) Solnechnaya Dolina (Sunny Valley Ski Resort) near Miass
  - Men's Snowboard Cross winner: (France) Pierre Vaultier
  - Women's Snowboard Cross winner: (Czech Republic) Eva Samková
- February 25 – 27: FIS SBC World Cup #5 in (South Korea) Bokwang Phoenix Park (Olympic Test Event for 2018)
  - Men's Snowboard Cross winner: (United States) Nate Holland
  - Women's Snowboard Cross winner: (France) Chloé Trespeuch
- March 4 – 6: FIS SBC World Cup #6 in (Switzerland) Veysonnaz
  - Men's Snowboard Cross #1 winner: (Canada) Baptiste Brochu
  - Men's Snowboard Cross #2 winner: (Spain) Lucas Eguibar
  - Women's Snowboard Cross #1 winner: (Bulgaria) Aleksandra Zhekova
  - Women's Snowboard Cross #2 winner: (Italy) Michela Moioli
- March 10 & 12: FIS SBC World Cup #7 in (United States) Squaw Valley Ski Resort
  - Events cancelled.
- March 19 & 20: FIS SBC World Cup #8 (final) in (Spain) Baqueira-Beret
  - Men's Snowboard Cross winner: (Australia) Alex Pullin
  - Women's Snowboard Cross winner: (Australia) Belle Brockhoff

=== Freestyle snowboarding ===
- August 20, 22, 28, and 30, 2015: FIS FSB World Cup #1 in (New Zealand) Cardrona Alpine Resort
  - Men's Halfpipe winner: (Japan) Raibu Katayama
  - Women's Halfpipe winner: (China) Cai Xuetong
  - Men's Slopestyle winner: (United States) Chris Corning
  - Women's Slopestyle winner: (United States) Jamie Anderson
- January 21 & 24: FIS FSB World Cup #2 in (United States) Mammoth Mountain Ski Area
  - Men's Halfpipe winner: (Japan) Ryō Aono
  - Women's Halfpipe winner: (United States) Kelly Clark
  - Men's Slopestyle winner: (United States) Brandon Davis
  - Women's Slopestyle winner: (Hungary) Anna Gyarmati
- February 4 & 6: FIS FSB World Cup #3 in (United States) Park City Mountain Resort
  - Men's Halfpipe winner: (United States) Matthew Ladley
  - Women's Halfpipe winner: (United States) Chloe Kim
- February 11: FIS FSB World Cup #4 in (United States) Boston
  - Men's Big Air winner: (Canada) Maxence Parrot
  - Women's Big Air winner: (United States) Julia Marino
- February 12 & 14: FIS FSB World Cup #6 in (Japan) Sapporo
  - Men's Halfpipe winner: (Japan) Ryō Aono
  - Women's Halfpipe winner: (China) Cai Xuetong
- February 13: FIS FSB World Cup #5 in (Canada) Quebec City
  - Men's Big Air winner: (Canada) Maxence Parrot
  - Women's Big Air winner: (United States) Jamie Anderson
- February 19 & 21: FIS FSB World Cup #7 in (South Korea) Bokwang Phoenix Park (Olympic Test Event for 2018)
  - Men's Slopestyle winner: (United States) Brock Crouch
  - Women's Slopestyle winner: (United States) Jamie Anderson
- March 19 & 20: FIS FSB World Cup #8 (final) in (Czech Republic) Špindlerův Mlýn
  - Men's Slopestyle winner: (United Kingdom) Jamie Nicholls
  - Women's Slopestyle winner: (Germany) Silvia Mittermueller

=== FIS Snowboard South American Continental Cup ===
- August 17 – 19: South American Continental Cup #1 in (Chile) Corralco
  - Women's snowboard cross winner: (Brazil) Isabel Clark Ribeiro
  - Men's snowboard cross winner: (Argentina) Franco Ruffini
  - Women's snowboard cross winner: (Brazil) Isabel Clark Ribeiro
  - Men's snowboard cross winner: (Argentina) Hernán Cataldi
- August 31 – September 1: South American Continental Cup #2 in (Chile) Antillanca ski resort
  - Women's snowboard cross winner: (Brazil) Isabel Clark Ribeiro
  - Men's snowboard cross winner: (Australia) Josh Miller
  - Women's snowboard cross winner: (Argentina) Catalina Petersen
  - Men's snowboard cross winner: (Canada) Tyler Jackson
- September 10 – 12: South American Continental Cup #3 in (Chile) El Colorado Ski Resort
  - Women's Big Air winner: (Chile) Antonia Yañez
  - Men's Big Air winner: (Argentina) Federico Chiaradio
  - Men's Big Air winner: (Chile) Iñaki Irarrázaval

=== FIS Snowboard Oceanian Continental Cup ===
- July 25 & 26: Oceanian Continental Cup #1 in (New Zealand) Cardrona Alpine Resort
  - Men's Halfpipe winner: (New Zealand) Freeman Andrews
  - Women's Halfpipe winner: (Australia) Emily Arthur
  - Men's Slopestyle winner: (New Zealand) Tiarn Collins
  - Women's Slopestyle winner: (New Zealand) Zoi Sadowski Synnott
- August 5 – 7: Oceanian Continental Cup #2 in (Australia) Mount Hotham
  - Women's snowboard cross winner: (Australia) Belle Brockhoff
  - Men's snowboard cross winner: (Australia) Alex Pullin
  - Women's snowboard cross winner: (Australia) Belle Brockhoff
  - Men's snowboard cross winner: (Australia) Alex Pullin

=== FIS Snowboard Europa Cup ===
- October 15 & 16: Europa Cup #1 in (Netherlands) Landgraaf
  - Women's Parallel Slalom winner: (Italy) Nadya Ochner
  - Men's Parallel Slalom winner: (Austria) Alexander Payer
  - Women's Parallel Slalom winner: (Italy) Nadya Ochner
  - Men's Parallel Slalom winner: (Russia) Andrey Sobolev
- November 4 & 5: Europa Cup #2 in (Netherlands) Landgraaf
  - Men's Slopestyle winner: (Netherlands) Niek van der Velden
  - Women's Slopestyle winner: (Germany) Silvia Mittermueller
  - Men's Slopestyle winner: (Finland) Ville Paumola
  - Women's Slopestyle winner: (Russia) Sofya Fedorova
- November 25 & 26: Europa Cup #3 in (Austria) Pitztal
  - Women's Snowboardcross winner: (Czech Republic) Eva Samková
  - Men's Snowboardcross winner: (Austria) Hanno Douschan
  - Women's Snowboardcross winner: (Austria) Maria Ramberger
  - Men's Snowboardcross winner: (Austria) Hanno Douschan
- November 28: Europa Cup #4 in (Austria) Kaunertal
  - This stage was cancelled
- December 5 & 6: Europa Cup #5 in (Germany) Hochfuegen
  - Men's Parallel Giant Slalom #1 winner: (Bulgaria) Radoslav Yankov
  - Men's Parallel Giant Slalom #2 winner: (Bulgaria) Radoslav Yankov
  - Women's Parallel Giant Slalom #1 winner: (Germany) Selina Jörg
  - Women's Parallel Giant Slalom #2 winner: (Germany) Selina Jörg
- December 19 & 20: Europa Cup #6 in (Slovenia) Rogla
  - This stage was cancelled
- January 15 & 16: Europa Cup #7 in (Switzerland) Davos
  - Women's Big Air winner: (Czech Republic) Kateřina Vojáčková
  - Men's Big Air winner: (Italy) Emiliano Lauzi
- January 23 & 24: Europa Cup #8 in (Germany) Oberwiesenthal
  - This stage was cancelled
- January 26 & 27: Europa Cup #9 in (France) Vars, Hautes-Alpes
  - Women's Slopestyle #1 winner: (Russia) Sofya Fedorova
  - Women's Slopestyle #2 winner: (Russia) Sofya Fedorova
  - Men's Slopestyle #1 winner: (Norway) Markus Olimstad
  - Men's Slopestyle #2 winner: (Norway) Stian Kleivdal
- January 28 – 30: Europa Cup #10 in (Serbia) Stara Planina
  - Men's Parallel Slalom winner: (Russia) Dmitry Sarsembaev
  - Women's Parallel Slalom winner: (Germany) Carolin Langenhorst
  - Men's Parallel Giant Slalom winner: (Russia) Dmitry Sarsembaev
  - Women's Parallel Giant Slalom winner: (Russia) Anastasia Kurochkina
- January 30 & 31: Europa Cup #11 in (Germany) Obermaiselstein–Grasgehren
  - Men's Snowboardcross winner: (Italy) Tommaso Leoni
  - Women's Snowboardcross winner: (Germany) Hanna Ihedioha
- February 20 & 21: Europa Cup #12 in (Italy) Seiser Alm
  - Men's Slopestyle #1 winner: (Italy) Loris Framarin
  - Men's Slopestyle #2 winner: (Spain) Aleix López
  - Women's Slopestyle #1 winner: (Czech Republic) Kateřina Vojáčková
  - Women's Slopestyle #2 winner: (Netherlands) Babs Barnhoorn
- February 20 & 21: Europa Cup #13 in (Switzerland) Lenzerheide
  - Men's Parallel Slalom #1 winner: (Italy) Edwin Coratti
  - Men's Parallel Slalom #2 winner: (Germany) Stefan Baumeister
  - Women's Parallel Slalom #1 winner: (Austria) Sabine Schöffmann
  - Women's Parallel Slalom #2 winner: (Austria) Sabine Schöffmann
- February 20 & 21: Europa Cup #13 in (Switzerland) Davos
  - Men's Halfpipe #1 winner: (Russia) Nikita Avtaneev
  - Men's Halfpipe #2 winner: (Switzerland) Elias Gian Allenspach
  - Women's Halfpipe #1 winner: (Switzerland) Berenice Wicki
  - Women's Halfpipe #2 winner: (Switzerland) Ramona Petrig
- February 27 & 28: Europa Cup #14 in (Czech Republic) Boží Dar
  - This event is cancelled

=== North American Cup 2015–2016 ===
- November 18 & 19, 2015: North American Cup #1 in (United States) Echo Mountain
- Women's Parallel Slalom #1 winner: (Czech Republic) Ester Ledecká
- Women's Parallel Slalom #2 winner: (Switzerland) Julie Zogg
- Men's Parallel Slalom #1 winner: (Switzerland) Nevin Galmarini
- Men's Parallel Slalom #2 winner: (Japan) Masaki Shiba
- December 19 & 20, 2015: North American Cup #2 in (United States) Buck Hill
- Women's Parallel Slalom #1 winner: (Canada) Katrina Gerencser
- Women's Parallel Slalom #2 winner: (Japan) Asa Toyoda
- Men's Parallel Slalom #1 winner: (Japan) Yuya Suzuki
- Men's Parallel Slalom #2 winner: (United States) Steven MacCutcheon
- January 16 & 17, 2016: North American Cup #3 in (United States) Howelsen Hill Ski Area
  - Men's Parallel Giant Slalom winner: (United States) Robert Burns
  - Men's Parallel Slalom winner: (Canada) Sébastien Beaulieu
  - Women's Parallel Giant Slalom winner: (Canada) Jennifer Hawkrigg
  - Women's Parallel Slalom winner: (Canada) Emma Van Groningen
- January 29 – 31, 2016: North American Cup #4 in (Canada) Tabor Mountain Ski Resort #1
  - Men's Snowboardcross #1 winner: (Australia) Adam Dickson
  - Men's Snowboardcross #2 winner: (United States) Cole Johnson
  - Women's Snowboardcross #1 winner: (Canada) Carle Brenneman
  - Women's Snowboardcross #2 winner: (United States) Rosina Mancari
- February 3 – 5, 2016: North American Cup #5 in (Canada) Tabor Mountain Ski Resort #2
  - Men's Snowboardcross #1 winner: (Australia) Adam Dickson
  - Men's Snowboardcross #2 winner: (Australia) Adam Dickson
  - Women's Snowboardcross #1 winner: (Canada) Carle Brenneman
  - Women's Snowboardcross #2 winner: (Canada) Meryeta O'Dine
- February 16 – 21, 2016: North American Cup #6 in (United States) Ski Cooper
  - Men's Snowboardcross #1 winner: (United States) Hagen Kearney
  - Men's Snowboardcross #2 winner: (Australia) Adam Dickson
  - Men's Snowboardcross #3 winner: (United States) Devryn Valley
  - Women's Snowboardcross #1 winner: (United States) Lindsey Jacobellis
  - Women's Snowboardcross #2 winner: (United States) Rosina Mancari
  - Women's Snowboardcross #3 winner: (Australia) Ellise Turner
- February 17 & 18, 2016: North American Cup #7 in (Canada) Toronto Ski Club
  - Men's Parallel Giant Slalom #1 winner: (South Korea) Kim Sang-kyum
  - Men's Parallel Giant Slalom #2 winner: (South Korea) Kim Sang-kyum
  - Women's Parallel Giant Slalom #1 winner: (Canada) Megan Farrell
  - Women's Parallel Giant Slalom #2 winner: (Canada) Megan Farrell
- February 22 & 23, 2016: North American Cup #8 in (United States) Holiday Valley
  - Men's Parallel Giant Slalom #1 winner: (Canada) Sebastien Beaulieu
  - Men's Parallel Giant Slalom #2 winner: (Canada) Sebastien Beaulieu
  - Women's Parallel Giant Slalom #1 winner: (Canada) Megan Farrell
  - Women's Parallel Giant Slalom #2 winner: (Canada) Megan Farrell
- February 27 & 28, 2016: North American Cup #9 in (Canada) Le Relais
  - Men's Parallel Giant Slalom #1 winner: (Canada) Jasey-Jay Anderson
  - Men's Parallel Giant Slalom #2 winner: (South Korea) Kim Sang-kyum
  - Women's Parallel Giant Slalom #1 winner: (Canada) Megan Farrell
  - Women's Parallel Giant Slalom #2 winner: (Canada) Megan Farrell
- February 29 – March 4, 2016: North American Cup #10 in (United States) Sugarloaf
- March 16 & 17, 2016: North American Cup #11 in (United States) Squaw Valley Ski Resort
- March 21 – 26, 2016: North American Cup #12 in (Canada) Ski Chantecler
- April 3 – 5, 2016: North American Cup #13 (final) in (United States) Copper Mountain

=== 2015–16 IPC Snowboarding World Cup ===
- November 19 & 20, 2015: IPC SB World Cup #1 in (Netherlands) Landgraaf
  - For Men's Bank Slalom #1 results, click here.
  - For Women's Bank Slalom #1 results, click here.
  - For Men's Bank Slalom #2 results, click here.
  - For Women's Bank Slalom #2 results, click here.
- February 5 & 6: IPC SB World Cup #2 in (United States) Aspen/Snowmass
  - For the Men's and Women's Snowboard Cross results, click here.
- February 10 – 13: IPC SB World Cup #3 in (Canada) Big White Ski Resort
  - For the Snowboard Cross and the Banked Slalom results, click here.
- March 5 & 6: IPC SB World Cup #4 in (Spain) La Molina
  - Events cancelled.
- March 9 – 12: IPC SB World Cup #5 in (France) Les Angles, Pyrénées-Orientales
  - For the banked slalom results, click here.
- March 15 & 16: IPC SB World Cup #6 in (Italy) Trentino (Predazzo)
  - For snowboard cross results, click here.
- March 17 & 18: IPC SB World Cup #7 (final) in (Italy) Trentino
  - For snowboard cross and banked slalom results, click here.
