= McJames =

McJames is a surname. Notable people with the surname include:

- Doc McJames (1874–1901), American baseball player
- Megan McJames (born 1987), American alpine skier
