= Klaus Brandner (skier) =

German alpine ski racer (born 1990)

Personal information
- Born: 30 January 1990 (age 36)

Skiing career
- Sport: Alpine skiing
- Club: WSV Koenigssee

Klaus Brandner (born 30 January 1990) is a German former alpine ski racer.

He competed at the 2015 World Championships in Beaver Creek, USA, in the Super-G.
