= Tristan Tafel =

Canadian freestyle skier

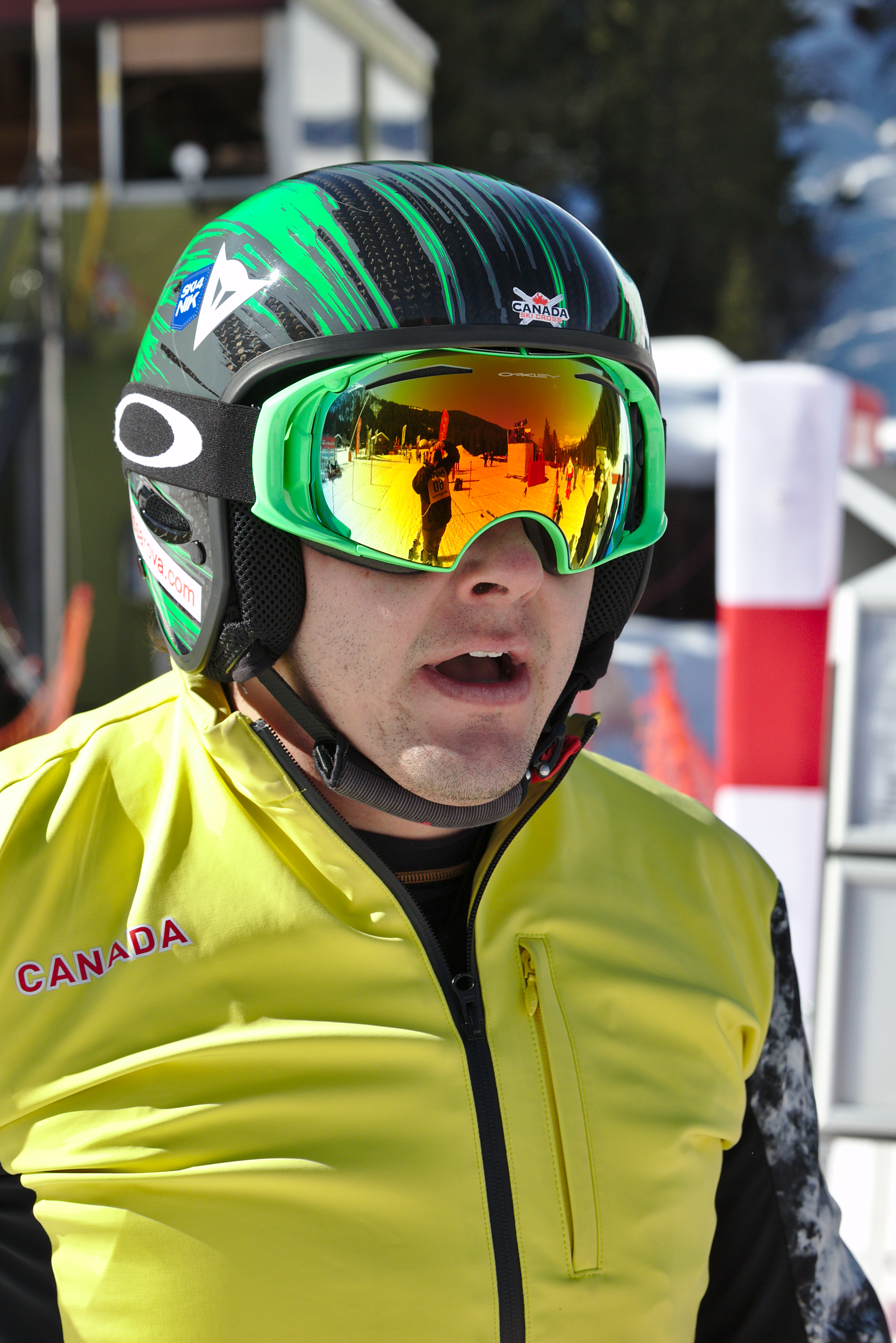

Personal information
- Born: February 26, 1990 (age 36) Canmore, Alberta, Canada
- Height: 5 ft 1 in (1.55 m)
- Weight: 125 lb (57 kg)

Sport
- Country: Canada
- Sport: Freestyle skiing

Achievements and titles
- World finals: 9th Voss Norway 2011World Championships
- National finals: 2 time national champion
- Highest world ranking: 15th overall 2011/12 - 2012/13

Tristan Tafel (born February 26, 1990) is a Canadian freestyle skier specializing in ski cross.
