= Albiez-Montrond =

Albiez-Montrond Arbyié lo Vieuye (Savoyard)
- Commune
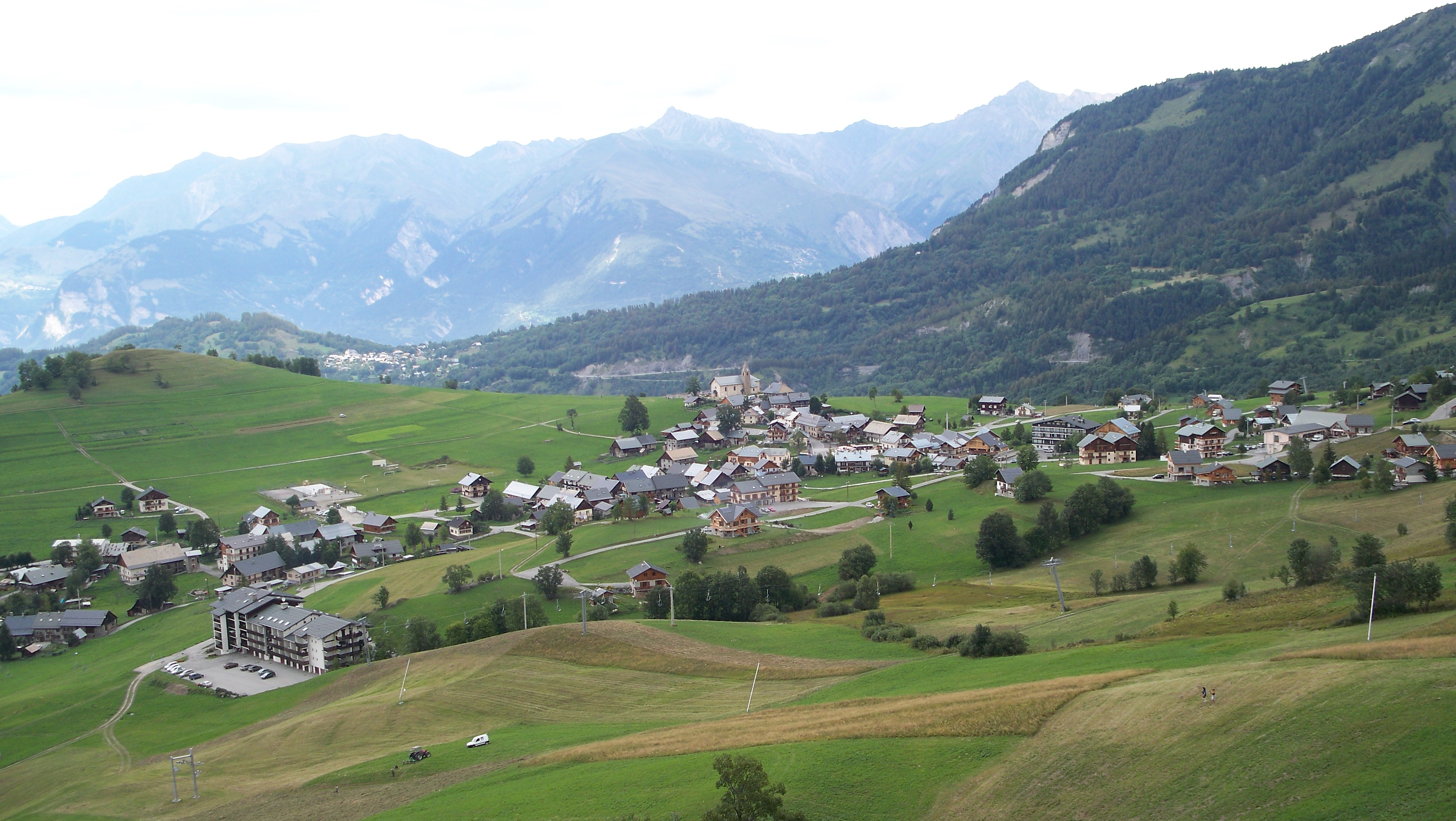
- A general view of Albiez-Montrond
- Location of Albiez-Montrond
- Location within France Location within Auvergne-Rhône-Alpes
- Coordinates: 45°13′14″N 6°20′29″E
- Country: France
- Region: Auvergne-Rhône-Alpes
- Department: Savoie
- Arrondissement: Saint-Jean-de-Maurienne
- Canton: Saint-Jean-de-Maurienne
- Intercommunality: Cœur de Maurienne Arvan

Government
  - Mayor (2025–2026): Alain Mollaret
- Area^{1}: 48.58 km^{2} (18.76 sq mi)
- Highest elevation: 3,320 m (10,890 ft)
- Lowest elevation: 738 m (2,421 ft)
- Population (2023): 350
  - Density: 7.2/km^{2} (19/sq mi)
- Time zone: UTC+01:00 (CET)
  - Summer (DST): UTC+02:00 (CEST)
- INSEE/Postal code: 73013 /73300
- ^{1} French Land Register data, which excludes lakes, ponds, glaciers > 1 km^{2} (0.386 sq mi or 247 acres) and river estuaries.

Albiez-Montrond (Savoyard: Arbyié lo Vieuye) is a commune in the Savoie department in the Auvergne-Rhône-Alpes region in south-eastern France.

== Geography ==
=== Climate ===
Albiez-Montrond has a humid continental climate (Köppen climate classification Dfb). The average annual temperature in Albiez-Montrond is 6.6 °C (43.9 °F). The average annual rainfall is 955.9 mm (37.63 in) with November as the wettest month. The temperatures are highest on average in July, at around 14.9 °C (58.8 °F), and lowest in January, at around −1.0 °C (30.2 °F). The highest temperature ever recorded in Albiez-Montrond was 32.1 °C (89.8 °F) on 7 July 2015; the coldest temperature ever recorded was −22.6 °C (−8.7 °F) on 5 February 2012.

Climate data for Albiez-Montrond (1991−2020 normals, extremes 1992−present)
Month	Jan	Feb	Mar	Apr	May	Jun	Jul	Aug	Sep	Oct	Nov	Dec	Year
Record high °C (°F)	13.8 (56.8)	16.9 (62.4)	18.7 (65.7)	21.5 (70.7)	26.8 (80.2)	31.0 (87.8)	32.1 (89.8)	30.1 (86.2)	24.6 (76.3)	25.3 (77.5)	20.0 (68.0)	16.0 (60.8)	32.1 (89.8)
Mean daily maximum °C (°F)	3.1 (37.6)	4.0 (39.2)	7.4 (45.3)	10.1 (50.2)	14.0 (57.2)	17.9 (64.2)	20.2 (68.4)	19.7 (67.5)	15.4 (59.7)	12.1 (53.8)	6.8 (44.2)	3.5 (38.3)	11.2 (52.2)
Daily mean °C (°F)	−1.0 (30.2)	−0.7 (30.7)	2.4 (36.3)	5.4 (41.7)	9.3 (48.7)	12.8 (55.0)	14.9 (58.8)	14.8 (58.6)	11.0 (51.8)	7.8 (46.0)	2.8 (37.0)	−0.3 (31.5)	6.6 (43.9)
Mean daily minimum °C (°F)	−5.1 (22.8)	−5.4 (22.3)	−2.6 (27.3)	0.8 (33.4)	4.6 (40.3)	7.7 (45.9)	9.6 (49.3)	9.9 (49.8)	6.5 (43.7)	3.5 (38.3)	−1.1 (30.0)	−4.0 (24.8)	2.0 (35.6)
Record low °C (°F)	−19.2 (−2.6)	−22.6 (−8.7)	−17.9 (−0.2)	−11.2 (11.8)	−5.4 (22.3)	−3.5 (25.7)	0.5 (32.9)	0.1 (32.2)	−5.0 (23.0)	−9.8 (14.4)	−14.6 (5.7)	−17.5 (0.5)	−22.6 (−8.7)
Average precipitation mm (inches)	85.5 (3.37)	66.1 (2.60)	69.3 (2.73)	71.3 (2.81)	91.2 (3.59)	76.1 (3.00)	72.1 (2.84)	77.3 (3.04)	73.3 (2.89)	81.3 (3.20)	97.1 (3.82)	95.3 (3.75)	955.9 (37.63)
Average precipitation days (≥ 1.0 mm)	9.9	8.4	9.0	9.6	11.6	10.5	8.5	9.2	7.9	9.3	9.9	10.6	114.1
Source: Météo-France

== Population ==
Historical population
Year	Pop.	±% p.a.
1968	376	—
1975	349	−1.06%
1982	319	−1.28%
1990	301	−0.72%
1999	382	+2.68%
2007	362	−0.67%
2012	382	+1.08%
2017	376	−0.32%
2023	350	−1.19%
Source: INSEE

== See also ==
- Communes of the Savoie department
