= Megan McJames =

American alpine skier (born 1987)

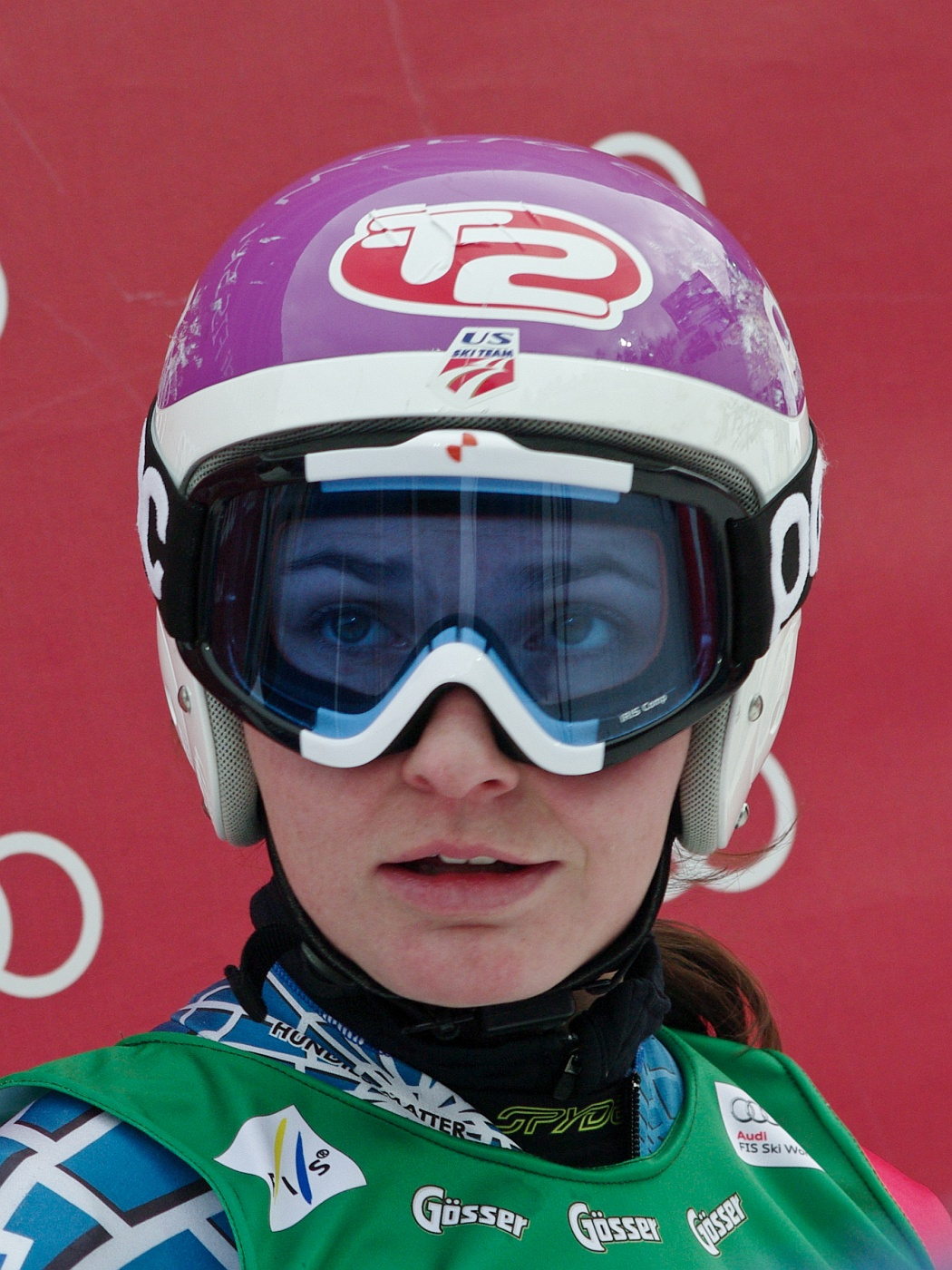
McJames in December 2010

Megan McJames (born September 24, 1987, in Park City, Utah) is an American alpine skier. She began skiing at age 2 and joined the Park City Ski Team at age 8. She attended The Winter Sports School in Park City, graduating in 2005. In 2008, she was the NorAm GS champion.

She was named to the US team at the 2010 Winter Olympics and 2014 Winter Olympics.
