= FIS Freestyle World Ski Championships 2011 – Women's ski cross =

The women's Ski cross competition of the FIS Freestyle World Ski Championships 2011 was held at Deer Valley, Utah, United States between February 3 and 4, 2011 (qualifications and finals).

24 athletes from 13 countries competed.

== Results ==
=== Qualification ===
The following are the results of the qualification.

Rank	Bib	Name	Country	Time	Note
1	6	Heidi Zacher	Germany	1:06.58	Q
2	7	Marte Hoeie Gjefsen	Austria	1:06.80	Q
3	3	Anna Woerner	Germany	1:06.96	Q
4	16	Kelsey Serwa	Canada	1:06.96	Q
5	4	Fanny Smith	Switzerland	1:07.12	Q
6	1	Anna Holmlund	Sweden	1:07.23	Q
7	8	Julia Murray	Canada	1:07.69	Q
8	11	Ophelie David	France	1:07.69	Q
9	10	Nikol Kucerova	Czech Republic	1:07.69	Q
10	9	Danielle Poleschuk	Canada	1:07.90	Q
11	12	Katrin Müller	Switzerland	1:08.02	Q
12	14	Jenny Owens	Australia	1:08.13	Q
13	19	Marielle Thompson	Canada	1:09.11	Q
14	22	Karolina Riemen	Poland	1:09.15	Q
15	13	Julie Brendengen Jensen	Norway	1:09.27	Q
16	18	Katya Crema	Australia	1:09.30	Q
17	5	Katrin Ofner	Austria	1:09.62	Q
18	2	Sami Kennedy	Australia	1:09.64	Q
19	20	Emily Sarsfield	United Kingdom	1:09.83	Q
20	21	Yulia Livinskaya	Russia	1:09.85	Q
21	24	Sarah Sauvey	United Kingdom	1:11.39	Q
22	33	Reina Umehara	Japan	1:11.69	Q
23	15	Andrea Limbacher	Austria	1:18.62	Q
		Hedda Berntsen	Norway		DNS

=== Elimination round ===
==== 1/8 round ====
The top 32 qualifiers advanced to the 1/8 round. From here, they participated in four-person elimination races, with the top two from each race advancing.

Heat 1

Rank	Bib	Name	Country	Notes
1	1	Heidi Zacher	Germany	Q
2	17	Katrin Ofner	Austria	Q
3	16	Katya Crema	Australia	

Heat 3

Rank	Bib	Name	Country	Notes
1	5	Fanny Smith	Switzerland	Q
2	12	Jenny Owens	Australia	Q
3	21	Sarah Sauvey	United Kingdom	

Heat 5

Rank	Bib	Name	Country	Notes
1	3	Anna Woerner	Germany	Q
2	14	Karolina Riemen	Poland	Q
3	19	Emily Sarsfield	United Kingdom	

Heat 7

Rank	Bib	Name	Country	Notes
1	8	Danielle Poleschuk	Canada	Q
2	9	Julia Murray	Canada	Q
3	9	Andrea Limbacher	Austria	

Heat 2

Rank	Bib	Name	Country	Notes
1	8	Ophelie David	France	Q
2	9	Nikol Kucerova	Czech Republic	Q

Heat 4

Rank	Bib	Name	Country	Notes
1	4	Kelsey Serwa	Canada	Q
2	13	Marielle Thompson	Canada	Q
3	20	Yulia Livinskaya	Russia	DNF

Heat 6

Rank	Bib	Name	Country	Notes
1	6	Anna Holmlund	Sweden	Q
2	11	Katrin Müller	Switzerland	Q
3	22	Reina Umehara	Japan	

Heat 8

Rank	Bib	Name	Country	Notes
1	2	Marta Hoeie Gjefsen	Norway	Q
2	15	Julie Jensen	Norway	Q
3	18	Sami Kennedy	Australia	DNF

==== Quarterfinals round ====
Heat 1

Rank	Bib	Name	Country	Notes
1	1	Heidi Zacher	Germany	Q
2	17	Katrin Ofner	Austria	Q
3	9	Nikol Kucerova	Czech Republic	
4	8	Ophelie David	France	DNF

Heat 3

Rank	Bib	Name	Country	Notes
1	7	Anna Holmlund	Sweden	Q
2	14	Karolina Riemen	Poland	Q
3	11	Katrin Müller	Switzerland	
4	3	Anna Woerner	Germany	

Heat 2

Rank	Bib	Name	Country	Notes
1	12	Jenny Owens	Australia	Q
2	4	Kelsey Serwa	Canada	Q
3	13	Marielle Thompson	Canada	
4	5	Fanny Smith	Switzerland	DNF

Heat 4

Rank	Bib	Name	Country	Notes
1	2	Marte Hoeie Gjefsen	Norway	Q
2	7	Julia Murray	Canada	Q
3	15	Julie Jensen	Norway	
4	5	Fanny Smith	Switzerland	DNF

==== Semifinals round ====
Heat 1

Rank	Bib	Name	Country	Notes
1	4	Kelsey Serwa	Canada	Q
2	17	Katrin Ofner	Austria	Q
3	12	Jenny Owens	Australia	
4	1	Heidi Zacher	Germany	DNF

Heat 2

Rank	Bib	Name	Country	Notes
1	7	Anna Holmlund	Sweden	Q
2	6	Julia Murray	Canada	Q
3	14	Karolina Riemen	Poland	
4	2	Marte Hoeie Gjefsen	Norway	DNF

==== Final round ====
Small final

Rank	Bib	Name	Country	Notes
5	12	Jenny Owens	Australia	
6	14	Karolina Riemen	Poland	
7	1	Heidi Zacher	Germany	
8	2	Marte Hoeie Gjefsen	Norway	

Final

Rank	Bib	Name	Country	Notes
1st place, gold medalist(s)	4	Kelsey Serwa	Canada	
2nd place, silver medalist(s)	7	Julia Murray	Canada	
3rd place, bronze medalist(s)	6	Anna Holmlund	Sweden	
4	17	Katrin Ofner	Austria	
