= FIS Freestyle World Ski Championships 2013 – Women's ski cross =

The women's ski cross competition of the FIS Freestyle World Ski Championships 2013 was held at Myrkdalen-Voss, Norway on March 10 (qualifying and finals). 36 athletes from 13 countries competed.

== Results ==
=== Qualification ===
The following are the results of the qualification.

Rank	Bib	Name	Country	Time	Notes
1	15	Fanny Smith	Switzerland	58.98	Q
2	12	Ophélie David	France	59.58	Q
3	13	Katrin Müller	Switzerland	59.59	Q
4	10	Marielle Thompson	Canada	59.85	Q
5	16	Anna Wörner	Germany	59.91	Q
6	7	Katrin Ofner	Austria	1:00.02	Q
7	20	Jorinde Müller	Switzerland	1:00.31	Q
8	8	Alizée Baron	France	1:00.37	Q
9	5	Katya Crema	Australia	1:00.45	Q
10	11	Emilie Serain	Switzerland	1:00.48	Q
11	14	Karolina Riemen	Poland	1:00.53	Q
12	9	Marte Høie Gjefsen	Norway	1:00.60	Q
13	4	Heidi Zacher	Germany	1:00.60	Q
14	6	Georgia Simmerling	Canada	1:00.72	Q
15	26	Sandra Näslund	Sweden	1:00.86	Q
16	21	Sami Kennedy-Sim	Australia	1:00.92	Q
17	14	Saša Farič	Slovenia	1:01.09	Q
18	29	Emily Sarsfield	Great Britain	1:01.11	Q
19	30	Christina Staudinger	Austria	1:01.15	Q
20	17	Hedda Berntsen	Norway	1:01.36	Q
21	18	Sabrina Weilharter	Germany	1:01.68	Q
22	19	Julie Jensen	Norway	1:01.80	Q
23	23	Anastasya Chertsova	Russia	1:01.84	Q
24	22	Danielle Sundquist	Canada	1:01.86	Q
25	27	Nikol Kucerova	Czech Republic	1:01.94	Q
26	25	Yulia Livinskaya	Russia	1:02.13	Q
27	24	Jenny Owens	Australia	1:02.23	Q
28	35	Stephanie Joffroy	Chile	1:02.96	Q
29	34	Lidia Pentukhova	Russia	1:03.27	Q
30	33	Pamela Thorburn	Great Britain	1:04.09	Q
31	31	Sofia Smirnova	Russia	1:14.94	Q
	3	Christina Manhard	Germany	DNF	
	2	Marielle Berger Sabbatel	France	DNF	
	32	Tereza Charova	Czech Republic	DNF	
	36	Liz Stevenson	Great Britain	DNF	
	1	Kelsey Serwa	Canada	DNS	

=== Elimination round ===
==== 1/8 round ====
The top 31 qualifiers advanced to the 1/8 round. From here, they participated in four-person elimination races, with the top two from each race advancing.

Heat 1

Rank	Bib	Name	Notes
1	1	Fanny Smith (SUI)	Q
2	17	Saša Farič (SLO)	Q
3	16	Sami Kennedy-Sim (AUS)	

Heat 3

Rank	Bib	Name	Notes
1	12	Marte Høie Gjefsen (NOR)	Q
2	5	Anna Wörner (GER)	Q
3	21	Sabrina Weilharter (GER)	
4	28	Stephanie Joffroy (CHI)	

Heat 5

Rank	Bib	Name	Notes
1	3	Katrin Müller (SUI)	Q
2	14	Georgia Simmerling (CAN)	Q
3	19	Christina Staudinger (AUT)	
4	30	Pamela Thorburn (GBR)	

Heat 7

Rank	Bib	Name	Notes
1	7	Jorinde Müller (SUI)	Q
2	10	Emilie Serain (SUI)	Q
3	26	Yulia Livinskaya (RUS)	
4	23	Anastasya Chertsova (RUS)	

Heat 2

1	9	Katya Crema (AUS)	Q
2	8	Alizée Baron (FRA)	Q
3	24	Danielle Sundquist (CAN)	
4	25	Nikol Kucerova (CZE)	

Heat 4

Rank	Bib	Name	Notes
1	13	Heidi Zacher (GER)	Q
2	4	Marielle Thompson (CAN)	Q
3	20	Hedda Berntsen (NOR)	
4	29	Lidia Pentukhova (RUS)	

Heat 6

Rank	Bib	Name	Notes
1	11	Karolina Riemen (POL)	Q
2	6	Katrin Ofner (AUT)	Q
3	22	Julie Jensen (NOR)	
	27	Jenny Owens (AUS)	DNF

Heat 8

Rank	Bib	Name	Notes
1	2	Ophélie David (FRA)	Q
2	15	Sandra Näslund (SWE)	Q
3	18	Emily Sarsfield (GBR)	
4	31	Sofia Smirnova (RUS)	

==== Quarterfinals round ====
Heat 1

Rank	Bib	Name	Notes
1	1	Fanny Smith (SUI)	Q
2	8	Alizée Baron (FRA)	Q
3	9	Katya Crema (AUS)	
4	17	Saša Farič (SLO)	

Heat 3

Rank	Bib	Name	Notes
1	6	Katrin Ofner (AUT)	Q
2	3	Katrin Müller (SUI)	Q
3	11	Karolina Riemen (POL)	
4	14	Georgia Simmerling (CAN)	

Heat 2

Rank	Bib	Name	Notes
1	4	Marielle Thompson (CAN)	Q
2	5	Anna Wörner (GER)	Q
3	12	Marte Høie Gjefsen (NOR)	
4	13	Heidi Zacher (GER)	

Heat 4

Rank	Bib	Name	Notes
1	7	Jorinde Müller (SUI)	Q
2	2	Ophélie David (FRA)	Q
3	10	Emilie Serain (SUI)	
4	15	Sandra Näslund (SWE)	

==== Semifinals round ====
Heat 1

Rank	Bib	Name	Notes
1	4	Marielle Thompson (CAN)	Q
2	1	Fanny Smith (SUI)	Q
3	8	Alizée Baron (FRA)	
4	5	Anna Wörner (GER)	

Heat 2

Rank	Bib	Name	Notes
1	7	Jorinde Müller (SUI)	Q
2	2	Ophélie David (FRA)	Q
3	6	Katrin Ofner (AUT)	
	3	Katrin Müller (SUI)	DQI

==== Final round ====
Small final

Rank	Bib	Name	Notes
5	5	Anna Wörner (GER)	
6	6	Katrin Ofner (AUT)	
7	8	Alizée Baron (FRA)	

Final

Rank	Bib	Name	Notes
1st place, gold medalist(s)	1	Fanny Smith (SUI)	
2nd place, silver medalist(s)	4	Marielle Thompson (CAN)	
3rd place, bronze medalist(s)	2	Ophélie David (FRA)	
4	7	Jorinde Müller (SUI)	
