= FIS Freestyle Ski and Snowboarding World Championships 2015 – Women's ski cross =

The women's ski cross competition of the FIS Freestyle Ski and Snowboarding World Championships 2015 was held at Kreischberg, Austria on January 24 (qualifying) and January 25 (finals). 27 athletes from 14 countries competed.

== Results ==
=== Qualification ===
The following are the results of the qualification.

Rank	Bib	Name	Country	Time	Notes
1	7	Georgia Simmerling	Canada	1:05.85	Q
2	6	Ophélie David	France	1:05.90	Q
3	15	Marielle Thompson	Canada	1:06.07	Q
4	1	Marte Høie Gjefsen	Norway	1:06.14	Q
5	16	Fanny Smith	Switzerland	1:06.20	Q
6	4	Anna Holmlund	Sweden	1:06.34	Q
7	12	Karolina Riemen	Poland	1:06.53	Q
8	13	Andrea Limbacher	Austria	1:06.59	Q, Tie: 2.015
9	11	Christina Staudinger	Austria	1:06.59	Q, Tie: 2.144
10	8	Andrea Zemanova	Czech Republic	1:06.73	Q
11	9	Heidi Zacher	Germany	1:06.93	Q
12	5	Sami Kennedy-Sim	Australia	1:07.20	Q
13	2	Katrin Ofner	Austria	1:07.60	Q
14	18	Julie Jensen	Norway	1:07.71	Q
15	10	Julia Eichinger	Germany	1:07.80	Q
16	21	Nikol Kucerova	Czech Republic	1:07.86	Q
17	3	Alizée Baron	France	1:08.08	Q
18	14	Anastasiia Chirtcova	Russia	1:08.21	Q
19	23	Reina Umehara	Japan	1:08.29	Q
20	20	Margarethe Aschauer	Germany	1:08.35	Q
21	19	Yulia Livinskaya	Russia	1:08.53	Q
22	17	Sofia Smirnova	Russia	1:09.79	Q
23	22	Tania Prymak	United States	1:10.11	Q
24	26	Whitney Gardner	United States	1:10.28	Q
25	24	Josefine Cornelia Fiane	Norway	1:10.92	Q
26	25	Liz Stevenson	Great Britain	1:12.98	Q
27	27	Pamela Thorburn	Great Britain	1:34.90	Q

=== Elimination round ===
==== 1/8 round ====
The top 32 qualifiers advanced to the 1/8 round. From here, they participated in four-person elimination races, with the top two from each race advancing.

Heat 1

Rank	Bib	Name	Notes
1	16	Nikol Kucerova (CZE)	Q
2	17	Alizée Baron (FRA)	Q
	1	Georgia Simmerling (CAN)	DNS

Heat 3

Rank	Bib	Name	Notes
1	12	Sami Kennedy-Sim (AUS)	Q
2	5	Fanny Smith (SUI)	Q
3	21	Yulia Livinskaya (RUS)	

Heat 5

Rank	Bib	Name	Notes
1	3	Marielle Thompson (CAN)	Q
2	14	Julie Jensen (NOR)	Q
3	19	Reina Umehara (JPN)	

Heat 7

Rank	Bib	Name	Notes
1	7	Karolina Riemen (POL)	Q
2	10	Andrea Zemanova (CZE)	Q
3	26	Liz Stevenson (GBR)	
	23	Tania Prymak (USA)	DNF

Heat 2

1	8	Andrea Limbacher (AUT)	Q
2	9	Christina Staudinger (AUT)	Q
3	25	Josefine Cornelia Fiane (NOR)	
4	24	Whitney Gardner (USA)	

Heat 4

Rank	Bib	Name	Notes
1	4	Marte Høie Gjefsen (NOR)	Q
2	20	Margarethe Aschauer (GER)	Q
3	13	Katrin Ofner (AUT)	

Heat 6

Rank	Bib	Name	Notes
1	6	Anna Holmlund (SWE)	Q
2	11	Heidi Zacher (GER)	Q
3	22	Sofia Smirnova (RUS)	
	27	Pamela Thorburn (GBR)	DNS

Heat 8

Rank	Bib	Name	Notes
1	2	Ophélie David (FRA)	Q
2	15	Julia Eichinger (GER)	Q
3	18	Anastasiia Chirtcova (RUS)	

==== Quarterfinals round ====
Heat 1

Rank	Bib	Name	Notes
1	8	Andrea Limbacher (AUT)	Q
2	16	Nikol Kucerova (CZE)	Q
3	9	Christina Staudinger (AUT)	
4	17	Alizée Baron (FRA)	

Heat 3

Rank	Bib	Name	Notes
1	11	Heidi Zacher (GER)	Q
2	3	Marielle Thompson (CAN)	Q
3	6	Anna Holmlund (SWE)	
4	14	Julie Jensen (NOR)	

Heat 2

Rank	Bib	Name	Notes
1	5	Fanny Smith (SUI)	Q
2	20	Margarethe Aschauer (GER)	Q
3	12	Sami Kennedy-Sim (AUS)	
4	4	Marte Høie Gjefsen (NOR)	

Heat 4

Rank	Bib	Name	Notes
1	2	Ophélie David (FRA)	Q
2	15	Julia Eichinger (GER)	Q
3	7	Karolina Riemen (POL)	
4	10	Andrea Zemanova (CZE)	

==== Semifinals round ====
Heat 1

Rank	Bib	Name	Notes
1	5	Fanny Smith (SUI)	Q
2	8	Andrea Limbacher (AUT)	Q
3	16	Nikol Kucerova (CZE)	
4	20	Margarethe Aschauer (GER)	

Heat 2

Rank	Bib	Name	Notes
1	2	Ophélie David (FRA)	Q
2	15	Julia Eichinger (GER)	Q
	3	Marielle Thompson (CAN)	DNF
	11	Heidi Zacher (GER)	DNF

==== Final round ====
Small final

Rank	Bib	Name	Notes
5	3	Heidi Zacher (GER)	
6	15	Nikol Kucerova (CZE)	
7	8	Margarethe Aschauer (GER)	
	12	Marielle Thompson (CAN)	DNS

Final

Rank	Bib	Name	Notes
1st place, gold medalist(s)	8	Andrea Limbacher (AUT)	
2nd place, silver medalist(s)	2	Ophélie David (FRA)	
3rd place, bronze medalist(s)	5	Fanny Smith (SUI)	
4	15	Julia Eichinger (GER)	
