= Freestyle skiing at the 2014 Winter Olympics – Women's ski cross =

Women's ski cross at the XXII Olympic Winter Games
- Venue: Rosa Khutor Extreme Park, Krasnaya Polyana, Russia
- Dates: 21 February 2014
- Competitors: 28 from 12 nations

Medalists
| 1st place, gold medalist(s) | | Marielle Thompson | Canada |
| 2nd place, silver medalist(s) | | Kelsey Serwa | Canada |
| 3rd place, bronze medalist(s) | | Anna Holmlund | Sweden |

The women's ski cross event in freestyle skiing at the 2014 Winter Olympics in Sochi, Russia took place on 21 February 2014.

Maria Komissarova of Russia, who qualified for the event, had broken her spine on 15 February while training in Sochi and had to be operated on the spot. She was flown to Munich for further treatment the following day.

== Results ==
The event was started at 11:45.

=== Seeding ===
| Rank | Bib | Name | Country | Time | Difference | Notes |
|---|---|---|---|---|---|---|
| 1 | 13 | Kelsey Serwa | Canada | 1:21.45 | - | Q |
| 2 | 8 | Ophélie David | France | 1:21.46 | +0.01 | Q |
| 3 | 6 | Marielle Thompson | Canada | 1:21.56 | +0.11 | Q |
| 4 | 16 | Anna Holmlund | Sweden | 1:22.21 | +0.76 | Q |
| 5 | 4 | Marte Høie Gjefsen | Norway | 1:22.33 | +0.88 | Q |
| 6 | 14 | Sanna Lüdi | Switzerland | 1:22.37 | +0.92 | Q |
| 7 | 17 | Jorinde Müller | Switzerland | 1:22.46 | +1.01 | Q |
| 8 | 12 | Georgia Simmerling | Canada | 1:22.52 | +1.07 | Q |
| 9 | 18 | Anna Wörner | Germany | 1:22.95 | +1.50 | Q |
| 10 | 3 | Sandra Näslund | Sweden | 1:23.28 | +1.83 | Q |
| 11 | 20 | Katya Crema | Australia | 1.23.47 | +2.02 | Q |
| 12 | 15 | Katrin Müller | Switzerland | 1:23.85 | +2.40 | Q |
| 13 | 11 | Katrin Ofner | Austria | 1:24.10 | +2.65 | Q |
| 14 | 27 | Yulia Livinskaya | Russia | 1:24.21 | +2.76 | Q |
| 15 | 10 | Heidi Zacher | Germany | 1:24.24 | +2.79 | Q |
| 16 | 1 | Fanny Smith | Switzerland | 1:24.61 | +3.16 | Q |
| 17 | 9 | Marielle Berger Sabbatel | France | 1:24.62 | +3.17 | Q |
| 18 | 5 | Karolina Riemen | Poland | 1:24.86 | +3.41 | Q |
| 19 | 7 | Alizée Baron | France | 1:25.20 | +3.75 | Q |
| 20 | 26 | Andrea Zemanová | Czech Republic | 1:25.96 | +4.51 | Q |
| 21 | 21 | Anastasia Chirtsova | Russia | 1:25.99 | +4.54 | Q |
| 22 | 22 | Marion Josserand | France | 1:26.61 | +5.16 | Q |
| 23 | 2 | Andrea Limbacher | Austria | 1:26.88 | +5.43 | Q |
| 24 | 23 | Christina Staudinger | Austria | 1:28.30 | +6.85 | Q |
| 25 | 19 | Sami Kennedy-Sim | Australia | 1:38.51 | +17.06 | Q |
| 26 | 25 | Jenny Owens | Australia | 1:59.84 | +38.39 | Q |
| 27 | 24 | Nikol Kučerová | Czech Republic | DNF | DNF | Q |
| 28 | 29 | Stephanie Joffroy | Chile | DNF | DNF | Q |

=== Elimination round ===
==== 1/8 finals ====
The 32 seeds advanced to the 1/8 finals. From here, they participated in four-person elimination races, with the top two from each race advancing.

Heat 1

| Rank | Bib | Name | Country | Notes |
|---|---|---|---|---|
| 1 | 1 | Kelsey Serwa | Canada | Q |
| 2 | 16 | Fanny Smith | Switzerland | Q |
| 3 | 17 | Marielle Berger Sabbatel | France | |

Heat 2

| Rank | Bib | Name | Country | Notes |
|---|---|---|---|---|
| 1 | 8 | Georgia Simmerling | Canada | Q |
| 2 | 9 | Anna Wörner | Germany | Q |
| 3 | 24 | Christina Staudinger | Austria | |
| 4 | 25 | Sami Kennedy-Sim | Australia | DNF |

Heat 3

| Rank | Bib | Name | Country | Notes |
|---|---|---|---|---|
| 1 | 12 | Katrin Müller | Switzerland | Q |
| 2 | 28 | Stephanie Joffroy | Chile | Q |
| 3 | 5 | Marte Høie Gjefsen | Norway | |
| 4 | 21 | Anastasia Chirtsova | Russia | DNF |

Heat 4

| Rank | Bib | Name | Country | Notes |
|---|---|---|---|---|
| 1 | 4 | Anna Holmlund | Sweden | Q |
| 2 | 13 | Katrin Ofner | Austria | Q |
| 3 | 20 | Andrea Zemanová | Czech Republic | |

Heat 5

| Rank | Bib | Name | Country | Notes |
|---|---|---|---|---|
| 1 | 3 | Marielle Thompson | Canada | Q |
| 2 | 14 | Yulia Livinskaya | Russia | Q |
| 3 | 19 | Alizée Baron | France | |

Heat 6

| Rank | Bib | Name | Country | Notes |
|---|---|---|---|---|
| 1 | 6 | Sanna Lüdi | Switzerland | Q |
| 2 | 11 | Katya Crema | Australia | Q |
| 3 | 27 | Nikol Kučerová | Czech Republic | |
| 4 | 22 | Marion Josserand | France | |

Heat 7

| Rank | Bib | Name | Country | Notes |
|---|---|---|---|---|
| 1 | 10 | Sandra Näslund | Sweden | Q |
| 2 | 26 | Jenny Owens | Australia | Q |
| 3 | 23 | Andrea Limbacher | Austria | |
| 4 | 7 | Jorinde Müller | Switzerland | |

Heat 8

| Rank | Bib | Name | Country | Notes |
|---|---|---|---|---|
| 1 | 2 | Ophélie David | France | Q |
| 2 | 18 | Karolina Riemen | Poland | Q |
| 3 | 15 | Heidi Zacher | Germany | |

==== Quarterfinals ====
The top 2 from each heat of the 1/8 round advanced to the 1/4 round. From here, they participated in four-person elimination races, with the top two from each race advancing.

Heat 1

| Rank | Bib | Name | Country | Notes |
|---|---|---|---|---|
| 1 | 1 | Kelsey Serwa | Canada | Q |
| 2 | 16 | Fanny Smith | Switzerland | Q |
| 3 | 9 | Anna Wörner | Germany | DNF |
| 4 | 8 | Georgia Simmerling | Canada | DNF |

Heat 2

| Rank | Bib | Name | Country | Notes |
|---|---|---|---|---|
| 1 | 13 | Katrin Ofner | Austria | Q |
| 2 | 4 | Anna Holmlund | Sweden | Q |
| 3 | 12 | Katrin Müller | Switzerland | |
| 4 | 28 | Stephanie Joffroy | Chile | DNF |

Heat 3

| Rank | Bib | Name | Country | Notes |
|---|---|---|---|---|
| 1 | 3 | Marielle Thompson | Canada | Q |
| 2 | 11 | Katya Crema | Australia | Q |
| 3 | 14 | Yulia Livinskaya | Russia | |
| 4 | 6 | Sanna Lüdi | Switzerland | DNF |

Heat 4

| Rank | Bib | Name | Country | Notes |
|---|---|---|---|---|
| 1 | 2 | Ophélie David | France | Q |
| 2 | 10 | Sandra Näslund | Sweden | Q |
| 3 | 26 | Jenny Owens | Australia | |
| 4 | 18 | Karolina Riemen | Poland | DNF |

==== Semifinals ====
The top 2 from each heat of the 1/4 round advanced to the semifinals. From here, they participated in four-person elimination races, with the top two from each race advancing to the final and the third and fourth entering a classification race.

Heat 1

| Rank | Bib | Name | Country | Notes |
|---|---|---|---|---|
| 1 | 4 | Anna Holmlund | Sweden | BF |
| 2 | 1 | Kelsey Serwa | Canada | BF |
| 3 | 13 | Katrin Ofner | Austria | SF |
| 4 | 16 | Fanny Smith | Switzerland | SF |

Heat 2

| Rank | Bib | Name | Country | Notes |
|---|---|---|---|---|
| 1 | 3 | Marielle Thompson | Canada | BF |
| 2 | 2 | Ophélie David | France | BF |
| 3 | 11 | Katya Crema | Australia | SF |
| 4 | 10 | Sandra Näslund | Sweden | SF |

==== Finals ====
Small Final

| Rank | Bib | Name | Country | Notes |
|---|---|---|---|---|
| 5 | 10 | Sandra Näslund | Sweden | |
| 6 | 13 | Katrin Ofner | Austria | |
| 7 | 11 | Katya Crema | Australia | |
| 8 | 16 | Fanny Smith | Switzerland | |

Big Final

| Rank | Bib | Name | Country | Notes |
|---|---|---|---|---|
| 1st place, gold medalist(s) | 3 | Marielle Thompson | Canada | |
| 2nd place, silver medalist(s) | 1 | Kelsey Serwa | Canada | |
| 3rd place, bronze medalist(s) | 4 | Anna Holmlund | Sweden | |
| 4 | 2 | Ophélie David | France | |
