= Freestyle skiing at the 2010 Winter Olympics – Women's ski cross =

Ski Cross Women at the XXI Olympic Winter Games
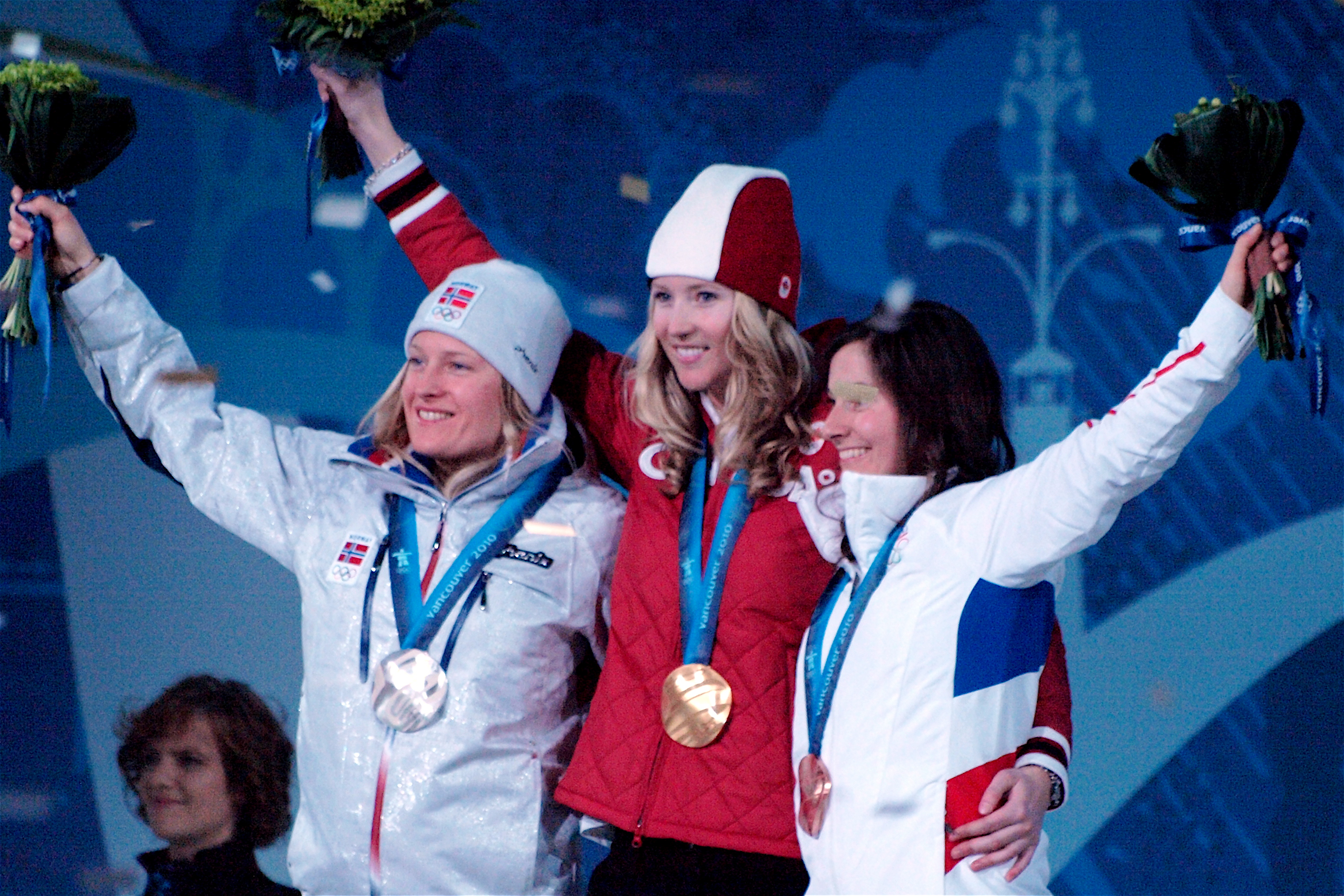
- From left to right: Hedda Berntsen (silver), Ashleigh McIvor (gold), Marion Josserand of France (bronze)
- Venue: Cypress Bowl Ski Area
- Dates: 23 February
- Competitors: 35 from 17 nations

Medalists
1st place, gold medalist(s)		Ashleigh McIvor	Canada
2nd place, silver medalist(s)		Hedda Berntsen	Norway
3rd place, bronze medalist(s)		Marion Josserand	France

The women's ski cross event in freestyle skiing at the 2010 Winter Olympics in Vancouver, Canada, took place on 23 February at Cypress Bowl Ski Area.

== Results ==
=== Qualification ===
The qualification was held at 10:30.

Rank	Bib	Name	Country	Time	Notes
1	11	Anna Holmlund	Sweden	1:17.15	Q
2	16	Ashleigh McIvor	Canada	1:17.17	Q
3	6	Fanny Smith	Switzerland	1:17.38	Q
4	7	Kelsey Serwa	Canada	1:17.94	Q
5	28	Hedda Berntsen	Norway	1:17.96	Q
6	5	Ophélie David	France	1:18.14	Q
7	20	Anna Wörner	Germany	1:18.45	Q
8	1	Karin Huttary	Austria	1:18.84	Q
9	12	Katrin Müller	Switzerland	1:18.92	Q
10	10	Danielle Poleschuk	Canada	1:19.02	Q
11	19	Magdalena Iljans	Sweden	1:19.05	Q
12	4	Marte Hoeie Gjefsen	Norway	1:19.30	Q
13	13	Marion Josserand	France	1:19.42	Q
14	14	Julia Murray	Canada	1:19.54	Q
15	25	Jenny Owens	Australia	1:19.80	Q
16	8	Sasa Faric	Slovenia	1:20.01	Q
17	27	Katya Crema	Australia	1:20.19	Q
18	29	Julie Jensen	Norway	1:20.23	Q
19	23	Heidi Zacher	Germany	1:20.35	Q
20	17	Sophie Fjellvang-Sølling	Denmark	1:20.41	Q
21	26	Noriko Fukushima	Japan	1:20.56	Q
22	21	Katrin Ofner	Austria	1:20.61	Q
23	18	Andrea Limbacher	Austria	1:20.86	Q
24	2	Julia Manhard	Germany	1:21.10	Q
25	9	Katharina Gutensohn	Austria	1:21.26	Q
26	32	Karolina Riemen	Poland	1:21.36	Q
27	15	Gro Kvinlog	Norway	1:21.93	Q
28	31	Chloe Georges	France	1:22.03	Q
29	22	Franziska Steffen	Switzerland	1:22.32	Q
30	24	Mitchey Greig	New Zealand	1:22.52	Q
31	33	Rocío Delgado	Spain	1:22.67	Q
32	30	Yulia Livinskaya	Russia	1:22.83	Q
33	35	Ruxandra Nedelcu	Romania	1:23.04	
34	34	Sarah Sauvey	Great Britain	1:24.52	
35	3	Sanna Lüdi	Switzerland	1:32.87	

=== Elimination round ===
The top two finishers from each heat advance to the next round. In the semifinals the first two ranked competitors of each heat proceed to the Big Final, third and fourth ranked competitors of each heat proceed to the Small Final.

==== 1/8 round ====
Heat 1

Rank	Bib	Name	Country	Notes
1	1	Anna Holmlund	Sweden	Q
2	16	Sasa Faric	Slovenia	Q
3	24	Julia Manhard	Germany	
4	32	Yulia Livinskaya	Russia	DNF

Heat 2

Rank	Bib	Name	Country	Notes
1	8	Karin Huttary	Austria	Q
2	17	Katya Crema	Australia	Q
3	25	Katharina Gutensohn	Austria	
4	9	Katrin Müller	Switzerland	DNF

Heat 3

Rank	Bib	Name	Country	Notes
1	6	Ophélie David	France	Q
2	11	Magdalena Iljans	Sweden	Q
3	27	Gro Kvinlog	Norway	
4	19	Heidi Zacher	Germany	

Heat 4

Rank	Bib	Name	Country	Notes
1	4	Kelsey Serwa	Canada	Q
2	13	Marion Josserand	France	Q
3	21	Noriko Fukushima	Japan	
4	29	Franziska Steffen	Switzerland	DNF

Heat 5

Rank	Bib	Name	Country	Notes
1	3	Fanny Smith	Switzerland	Q
2	14	Julia Murray	Canada	Q
3	22	Katrin Ofner	Austria	
4	30	Michelle Greig	New Zealand	

Heat 6

Rank	Bib	Name	Country	Notes
1	5	Hedda Berntsen	Norway	Q
2	12	Marte Hoeie Gjefsen	Norway	Q
3	20	Sophie Fjellvang-Sølling	Denmark	
4	28	Chloe Georges	France	

Heat 7

Rank	Bib	Name	Country	Notes
1	18	Julie Jensen	Norway	Q
2	26	Karolina Riemen	Poland	Q
3	10	Danielle Poleschuk	Canada	
4	7	Anna Wörner	Germany	DNF

Heat 8

Rank	Bib	Name	Country	Notes
1	2	Ashleigh McIvor	Canada	Q
2	15	Jenny Owens	Australia	Q
3	31	Rocío Delgado	Spain	
4	23	Andrea Limbacher	Austria	DNF

==== 1/4 Round ====
Heat 1

Rank	Bib	Name	Country	Notes
1	8	Karin Huttary	Austria	Q
2	1	Anna Holmlund	Sweden	Q
3	17	Katya Crema	Australia	
4	16	Sasa Faric	Slovenia	

Heat 2

Rank	Bib	Name	Country	Notes
1	4	Kelsey Serwa	Canada	Q
2	13	Marion Josserand	France	Q
3	11	Magdalena Iljans	Sweden	DNF
4	6	Ophélie David	France	DNF

Heat 3

Rank	Bib	Name	Country	Notes
1	5	Hedda Berntsen	Norway	Q
2	3	Fanny Smith	Switzerland	Q
3	12	Marte Hoeie Gjefsen	Norway	
4	14	Julia Murray	Canada	

Heat 4

Rank	Bib	Name	Country	Notes
1	2	Ashleigh McIvor	Canada	Q
2	18	Julie Jensen	Norway	Q
3	15	Jenny Owens	Australia	
4	26	Karolina Riemen	Poland	

==== Semifinals ====
Heat 1

Rank	Bib	Name	Country	Notes
1	8	Karin Huttary	Austria	Q
2	13	Marion Josserand	France	Q
3	4	Kelsey Serwa	Canada	
4	1	Anna Holmlund	Sweden	

Heat 2

Rank	Bib	Name	Country	Notes
1	5	Hedda Berntsen	Norway	Q
2	2	Ashleigh McIvor	Canada	Q
3	3	Fanny Smith	Switzerland	
4	18	Julie Jensen	Norway	

==== Finals ====
Small Final

Rank	Bib	Name	Country	Notes
5	4	Kelsey Serwa	Canada	
6	1	Anna Holmlund	Sweden	
7	3	Fanny Smith	Switzerland	
8	18	Julie Jensen	Norway	

Large Final

Rank	Bib	Name	Country	Notes
1st place, gold medalist(s)	2	Ashleigh McIvor	Canada	
2nd place, silver medalist(s)	5	Hedda Berntsen	Norway	
3rd place, bronze medalist(s)	13	Marion Josserand	France	
4	8	Karin Huttary	Austria	
