= Ninth wave (disambiguation) =

The Ninth Wave is an 1850 painting by Russian marine painter Ivan Aivazovsky.

Ninth Wave may also refer to:

== Music ==
- "The Ninth Wave", the second side of the 1985 album Hounds of Love by British singer Kate Bush
- "The Ninth Wave", a song by American heavy metal band Manilla Road from the 1985 album Open the Gates
- "The Ninth Wave", a song by Italian progressive death metal band Sadist from the 1996 album Tribe
- "The Ninth Wave", a song by German power metal band Blind Guardian from the 2015 album Beyond the Red Mirror
- "The Ninth Wave", a 2017 song by German alternative metal band Emil Bulls
- The Ninth Wave (band), a synth-pop band from Glasgow that won a 2016 Scottish Alternative Music Award

== Other uses ==
- A variant of the notion of a sneaker wave
- The Ninth Wave, a 1956 book by American political scientist Eugene Burdick
- The Ninth Wave, an 1899 play by Sophia Smirnova

== See also ==
- The Massive: Ninth Wave, a prequel to the comics series The Massive
