= Rocío Delgado =

Spanish freestyle skier

Personal information
- Born: July 21, 1977 (age 49) Huesca, Spain

Sport
- Sport: Skiing

World Cup career
- Indiv. podiums: 7
- Indiv. wins: 1
- Updated on July 31, 2013

Rocío Delgado (born July 21, 1977) is a Spanish freestyle skier, specializing in ski cross.

Delgado competed at the 2010 Winter Olympics for Spain. She placed 31st in the qualifying round in ski cross, to advance to the knockout stages. She finished third in her first round heat, and did not advance.

As of April 2013, her only finish at the World Championships is 24th, in 2009.

Delgado made her World Cup debut in January 2006. As of April 2013, her best finish at a World Cup event is 7th, coming at Sierra Nevada in 2007/08. Her best World Cup overall finish in ski cross is 16th, in 2007/08.
