= Freestyle skiing at the 2015 Winter Universiade – Women's ski cross =

The women's ski cross competition of the 2015 Winter Universiade was held at Sulayr Snowpark, Sierra Nevada, Spain seeding was held on February 13.

But it will be hold the elimination round at February 14, it informed was competition was cancelled.
So the results of seeding is the final results.

== Results ==
=== Seeding ===
Rank	Bib	Name	Country	Time	Difference	Notes
1st place, gold medalist(s)	1	Nikol Kučerová	Czech Republic	50.08		
2nd place, silver medalist(s)	7	Lidia Pentukhova	Russia	50.73	+0.65	
3rd place, bronze medalist(s)	3	Tania Prymak	United States	50.78	+0.7	
4	5	Maya Averyanova	Russia	51.07	+0.99	
5	6	Zoe Cheli	Switzerland	51.56	+1.48	
6	4	Ekaterina Starichenko	Russia	51.83	+1.75	
7	9	Paula Albrecht	Germany	52.05	+1.97	
8	8	Zoe Chastan	Switzerland	52.47	+2.39	
9	10	Viktoria Struk	Russia	52.61	+6.53	
10	13	Leta McNatt	United States	56.56	+6.48	
11	11	Lauren Salko	United States	1:00.05	+10.07	
	12	Atomura Akane	Japan			DNS
	14	Sofia Marchesini	Italy			DNS
	15	Shelby Dyer	United States			DNS
