= Ruxandra Nedelcu =

Romanian freestyle skier

Personal information
- Born: 30 November 1984 (age 41) Braşov, Romania
- Height: 161 cm (5 ft 3 in)
- Weight: 47 kg (104 lb)

Sport
- Sport: Freestyle skiing
- Club: Dinamo Braşov
- Updated on 31 July 2013

Ruxandra "Andra" Nedelcu (born 30 November 1984) is a Romanian freestyle skier, specializing in ski cross.

Nedelcu competed at the 2010 Winter Olympics for Romania. She placed 33rd in the qualifying round in ski cross, and did not advance to the knockout rounds due to a career ending knee injury.

Nedelcu made her World Cup debut in January 2009. As of April 2013, her best finish at a World Cup event is 26th, coming at St. Johann in 2009/10.

Nedelcu retired from freestyle skiing in 2011 and currently resides in West Vancouver, Canada.
