= Kelsey Serwa =

Canadian freestyle skier (born 1989)

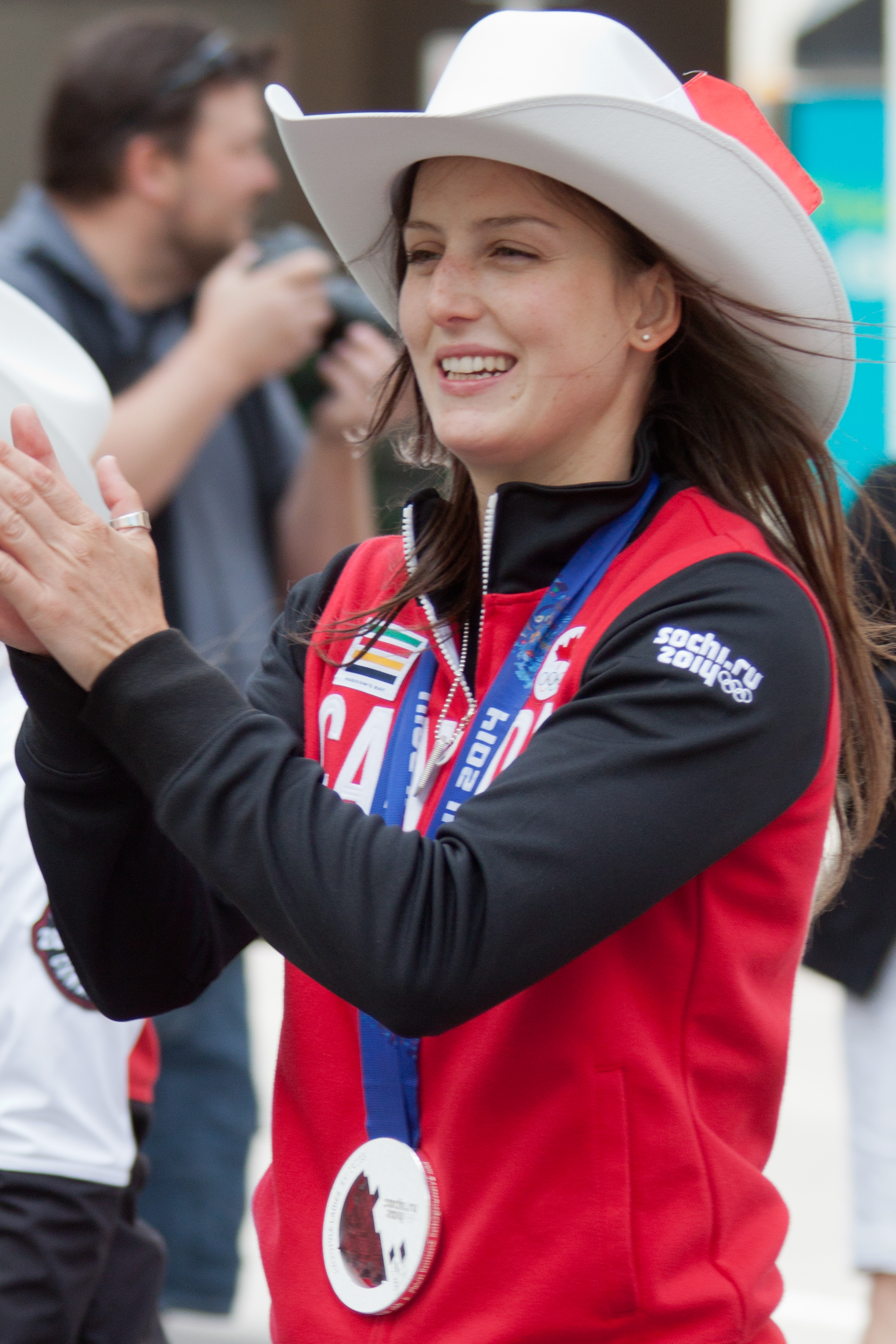
- Kelsey Serwa in Calgary, 2014

Personal information
- Nationality: Canada
- Born: September 1, 1989 (age 37) Kelowna, British Columbia, Canada

Sport
- Sport: Skiing
- Club: BC Ski Cross

World Cup career
- Seasons: 10 – (2009–2014, 2016–2019)
- Indiv. starts: 83
- Indiv. podiums: 20
- Indiv. wins: 8
- Overall titles: 0 – (7th in 2011)
- Discipline titles: 0 – Ski cross (3rd in 2009, 2011)
Medal record
Women's freestyle skiing
Representing Canada
Olympic Games
Gold medal – first place	2018 Pyeongchang	Ski cross
Silver medal – second place	2014 Sochi	Ski cross
World Championships
Gold medal – first place	2011 Deer Valley	Ski cross
Winter X Games
Gold medal – first place	2011 Aspen	Ski cross
Gold medal – first place	2016 Aspen	Ski cross
Bronze medal – third place	2010 Aspen	Ski cross

Kelsey Serwa (born September 1, 1989) is a Canadian retired freestyle skier who was a member of the Canadian national ski cross team. She won a gold medal at the 2018 Winter Olympics in Pyeongchang and a silver medal at the 2014 Winter Olympics in Sochi. She is the 2011 FIS World Champion and two times Winter X Games champion. In addition, she has won a bronze medal at the 2010 X Games.

== Competitive career ==
Serwa won a national championship in 2009 at Canada Olympic Park in Calgary, defeating world champion Ashleigh McIvor. Serwa won her first world cup event on January 13, 2009, at the Alpe d'Huez course after these finals were canceled on the 2009–10 Freestyle Skiing World Cup. Serwa won her first outright world cup race later that season at Lake Placid on January 24, 2010.

At the 2010 Winter X Games two weeks before the Olympics, Serwa managed to win a bronze at the famous cash event, fellow countrywoman Ashleigh McIvor had finished second. Serwa was a member of the Canadian Olympic team that competed in Vancouver in her home province of British Columbia. Serwa's bronze at the Winter X Games and third overall ranking on the world cup put her in as a medal favourite at the Olympics in Vancouver. She advanced to the semi-finals, but finished third in her heat and did not make the medal final. However, she competed in the "small final", which she won, finishing fifth overall.

During the next season Serwa won the gold at the X Games with a dramatic finish flying 150 feet in the air and crashing out badly injured, but the champion. Serwa carried her X Games winning momentum into the 2011 World Championships. There she qualified as the fourth fastest skier, Serwa then went on to finish first in the final ahead of teammate Julia Murray. With the victory she completed the seasonal sweep of the two biggest ski cross events in the world.

On February 21, 2014, Serwa won silver in women's ski cross during her second Olympics, finishing behind gold medalist and Canadian teammate Marielle Thompson.

Serwa suffered a training accident in December 2016 and considered retirement from ski cross, but ultimately returned to the sport following knee surgery. She subsequently earned a place on Canada's ski cross team for the 2018 Winter Olympics in Pyeongchang. Serwa went on to win the gold medal in women's ski cross, with her teammate Brittany Phelan winning the silver medal.

On July 4, 2019, Serwa announced her retirement from competitive ski cross, after ten years on the national team.

== Personal life ==
Serwa's grandfather, Clifford Jack Serwa, was a co-founder of the Big White Ski Resort, and later a longtime member of the Legislative Assembly of British Columbia representing Okanagan. Serwa married Stan Rey, a retired competitive ski cross athlete, in 2019. As of 2020, she was taking a break from studying kinesiology at the University of British Columbia at Okanagan, aiming to become a physiotherapist. She graduated with honours in November 2023 with a Masters of Physical Therapy, starting her career as a physiotherapist in Whistler, British Columbia.

== World Cup results ==
All results are sourced from the International Ski Federation (FIS).

=== Season standings ===
Season	Age	Overall	Ski cross	Cross Alps Tour
2009	19	12	3	—N/a
2010	20	11	4	—N/a
2011	21	7	3	—N/a
2012	22	29	9	—N/a
2013	23	19	4	—N/a
2014	24	73	17	—N/a
2015	25	did not compete		—N/a
2016	26	31	8	—N/a
2017	27	134	24	17
2018	28	27	7	6
2019	29	32	8	—N/a

=== Race podiums ===
- 8 wins – (8 SX)
- 20 podiums – (20 SX)

Season	Date	Location	Discipline	Place
2008–09	5 January 2009	St. Johann in Tirol/Oberndorf, Austria	Ski Cross	3rd
2008–09	20 March 2009	La Plagne, France	Ski Cross	2nd
2009–10	13 January 2010	Alpe d'Huez, France	Ski Cross	1st
2009–10	24 January 2010	(United States) Lake Placid, USA	Ski Cross	1st
2009–10	12 March 2010	Grindelwald, Switzerland	Ski Cross	1st
2010–11	18 December 2010	Innichen, Italy	Ski Cross	2nd
2010–11	12 January 2011	Alpe d'Huez, France	Ski Cross	1st
2010–11	16 January 2011	Les Contamines, France	Ski Cross	2nd
2010–11	13 March 2011	Branas, Sweden	Ski Cross	2nd
2010–11	19 March 2011	Myrkdalen-Voss, Norway	Ski Cross	2nd
2011–12	17 December 2011	Innichen, Italy	Ski Cross	1st
2011–12	18 December 2011	Innichen, Italy	Ski Cross	1st
2012–13	23 December 2012	Innichen, Italy	Ski Cross	1st
2012–13	15 January 2013	Megève, France	Ski Cross	2nd
2012–13	19 February 2013	Sochi, Russia	Ski Cross	1st
2013–14	21 December 2013	Innichen, Italy	Ski Cross	2nd
2015–16	20 December 2015	Innichen, Italy	Ski Cross	2nd
2015–16	28 February 2016	Bogwang, South Korea	Ski Cross	2nd
2017–18	7 December 2017	Val Thorens, France	Ski Cross	3rd
2018–19	20 January 2019	Idre, Sweden	Ski Cross	3rd

== Olympic results ==
- 2 medals – (1 gold, 1 silver)

Year	Age	Ski Cross
(Canada) 2010 Vancouver	20	5
(Russia) 2014 Sochi	24	2
(South Korea) 2018 Pyeongchang	28	1

== World Championships results ==
- 1 medal – (1 gold)

Year	Age	Ski Cross
(Japan) 2009 Inawashiro	19	5
(United States) 2011 Deer Valley	21	1
(Norway) 2013 Voss	23	DNS^{[a]}
(Austria) 2015 Kreischberg	25	did not compete
(Spain) 2017 Sierra Nevada	27	did not compete
(United States) 2019 Solitude Mountain	29	5

a. ^{1} Kelsey Serwa suffered a knee injury in training and was unable to compete in the race.
