= Gro Kvinlog =

Norwegian freestlyle skier

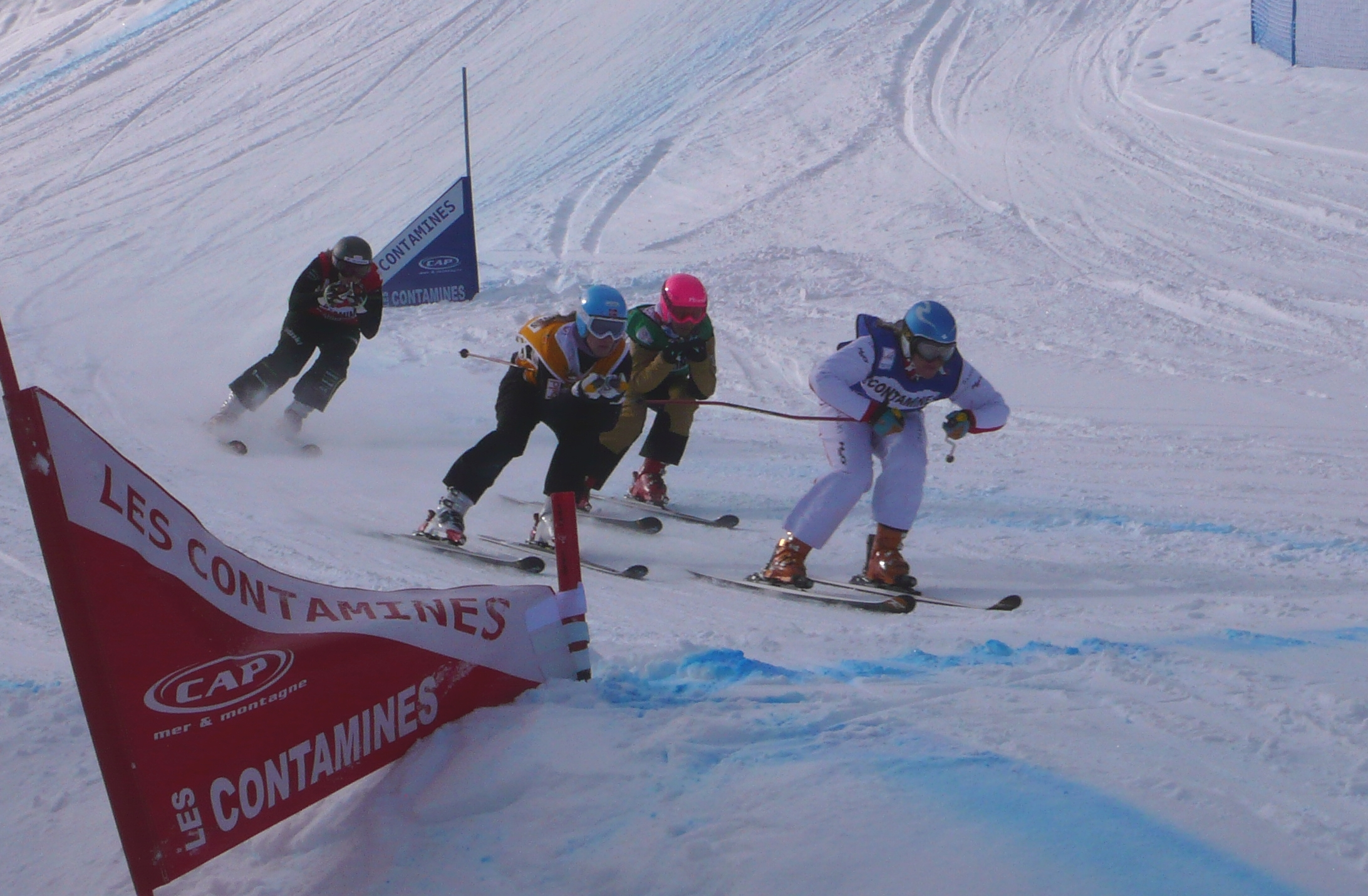
- From the Ski Cross World Cup at Les Contamines-Montjoie in 2010

Personal information
- Born: 8 June 1976 (age 50) Gjøvik, Norway

Sport
- Country: Norway
- Sport: Freestyle skiing

Gro Kvinlog Genlid (born 8 June 1976) is a Norwegian freestyle skier. She represented Norway in the Women's Ski Cross event at the 2010 Winter Olympics in Vancouver.

She competed at the 2010 World Cup in ski cross.

She was born in Gjøvik.
