= Freestyle skiing at the 2010 Winter Olympics =

Freestyle Skiing at the XXI Olympic Winter Games
- Venue: Cypress Mountain
- Dates: February 13–25
- No. of events: 6
- Competitors: 173 from 27 nations

The freestyle skiing competition of the 2010 Winter Olympics was held at Cypress Mountain. The events took place between the 13 and 25 February 2010, and included a new event for these Olympics, ski cross.

== Medal summary ==
=== Medal table ===
Rank	Nation	Gold	Silver	Bronze	Total
1	Canada	2	1	0	3
2	United States	1	1	2	4
3	Australia	1	1	0	2
4	Belarus	1	0	0	1
4	Switzerland	1	0	0	1
6	China	0	1	2	3
7	Norway	0	1	1	2
8	Austria	0	1	0	1
9	France	0	0	1	1
Totals (9 entries)		6	6	6	18

=== Men's Events ===
Event	Gold		Silver		Bronze	
Moguls	Alexandre Bilodeau; Canada	26.75	Dale Begg-Smith; Australia	26.58	Bryon Wilson; United States	26.08
Aerials	Alexei Grishin; Belarus	248.41	Jeret Peterson; United States	247.21	Liu Zhongqing; China	242.53
Ski cross	Michael Schmid; Switzerland		Andreas Matt; Austria		Audun Grønvold; Norway	

=== Women's Events ===
Event	Gold		Silver		Bronze	
Moguls	Hannah Kearney; United States	26.63	Jennifer Heil; Canada	25.69	Shannon Bahrke; United States	25.43
Aerials	Lydia Lassila; Australia	214.74	Li Nina; China	207.23	Guo Xinxin; China	205.22
Ski cross	Ashleigh McIvor; Canada		Hedda Berntsen; Norway		Marion Josserand; France	

== Events ==
Six freestyle skiing events was held at Vancouver 2010:

Men	Women
Aerials	Aerials
Moguls	Moguls
Ski cross	Ski cross

== Competition schedule ==
All times are Pacific Standard Time (UTC-8).

Day	Date	Start	Finish	Event	Phase
Day 2	Saturday 2010-02-13	16:30	17:30	Women's moguls	Qualification
Day 2	Saturday 2010-02-13	19:30	20:30	Women's moguls	Final
Day 3	Sunday 2010-02-14	14:30	15:30	Men's moguls	Qualification
Day 3	Sunday 2010-02-14	17:30	18:30	Men's moguls	Final
Day 9	Saturday 2010-02-20	10:00	11:30	Women's aerials	Qualification
Day 10	Sunday 2010-02-21	9:15	10:15	Men's ski cross	Qualification
Day 10	Sunday 2010-02-21	12:15	13:30	Men's ski cross	Final
Day 11	Monday 2010-02-22	18:00	19:30	Men's aerials	Qualification
Day 12	Tuesday 2010-02-23	10:30	11:30	Women's ski cross	Qualification
Day 12	Tuesday 2010-02-23	13:00	14:15	Women's ski cross	Final
Day 13	Wednesday 2010-02-24	19:30	20:30	Women's aerials	Final
Day 14	Thursday 2010-02-25	18:00	19:00	Men's aerials	Final

== Qualification ==
For the six events, there are a maximum 180 athletes allowed to compete. This includes a maximum of 30 in moguls, 25 in aerials, and 35 in ski cross, applicable for both genders. No nation can have more than 18 skiers with maximum of ten men or ten women per specific nation. For each event, no nation can enter more than four skiers per individual event.

Skiers are qualified if they have placed in the top 30 in an FIS World Cup event of FIS World Championships in the event concerned. A minimum of 100 FIS points in the respective event. Host nation Canada is expected to enter a skier in all events. If no skier meets the qualification standards, they can enter one skier per event.

Quota allocation will be given using the World Ranking List (WRL) for the twelve-month period of World Cup Standings from the 2008–09 and 2009-10 Freestyle World Cup and the FIS Freestyle World Ski Championships 2009. It will be assigned one slot per skier from the top the WRL downwards. When a nation has the maximum four skiers per event, the next eligible nation on the WRL will be given a slot until the maximum total per event in moguls, aerials, and ski cross per gender has been reached.

In the case at nation is given more than 18 skiers, it is up the nation to select the team of a maximum of 18 skiers by 25 January 2010. Once quota slots are allocated by the FIS and the national entries confirmed, a reallocation of unused slots per event will be made by the FIS to the next eligible nation on the WRL for quota allocation in the respective event and gender. This process started on 18 January 2010 and will run until 28 January 2010. Deadline to VANOC is 1 February 2010.

== Participating nations ==
Nations	Moguls Men	Moguls Ladies	Aerials Men	Aerials Ladies	Ski Cross Men	Ski Cross Ladies	Total (men + ladies)
Australia	2	1	1	4	1	2	11 (4 + 7)
Austria	0	1	0	0	4	4	9 (4 + 5)
Belarus	0	0	4	2	0	0	6 (4 + 2)
Canada	4	3	3	1	3	4	18 (10 + 8)
China	0	0	4	4	0	0	8 (4 + 4)
Czech Republic	1	3	0	1	2	0	7 (3 + 4)
Denmark	0	0	0	0	0	1	1 (0 + 1)
Finland	3	0	0	0	1	0	4 (4 + 0)
France	4	0	0	0	4	3	11 (8 + 3)
Great Britain	0	1	0	1	0	1	3 (0 + 3)
Germany	0	0	0	0	2	3	5 (2 + 3)
Italy	0	1	0	0	0	0	1 (0 + 1)
Jamaica	0	0	0	0	1	0	1 (1 + 0)
Japan	4	4	0	0	1	1	10 (5 + 5)
Kazakhstan	2	3	0	1	0	0	5 (2 + 6)
New Zealand	0	0	0	0	0	1	1 (0 + 1)
Norway	0	0	0	0	2	4	6 (2 + 4)
Poland	0	0	0	0	0	1	1 (0 + 1)
Romania	0	0	0	0	0	1	1 (0 + 1)
Russia	4	4	2	0	1	1	12 (7 + 5)
Slovenia	0	1	0	0	1	1	3 (1 + 2)
South Korea	0	1	0	0	0	0	1 (0 + 1)
Spain	0	0	0	0	0	1	1 (0 + 1)
Switzerland	0	0	4	2	4	4	14 (8 + 6)
Sweden	2	0	0	0	4	2	8 (6 + 2)
Ukraine	0	0	3	3	0	0	6 (3 + 3)
United States	4	4	4	4	2	0	18 (10 + 8)
Total: 27 NOCs	30	27	25	23	33	35	173
