= Julia Murray =

Canadian freestyle skier (born 1988)

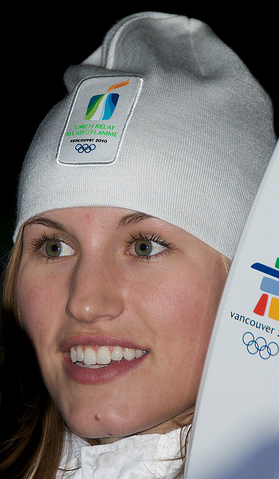

Personal information
- Born: December 23, 1988 (age 37) Vancouver, British Columbia, Canada
- Height: 1.70 m (5 ft 7 in)
- Weight: 61.2 kg (135 lb; 9.64 st)
- Website: www.juliamurray.ca

Sport
- Country: Canada
Medal record
Women's freestyle skiing
Representing Canada
World Championships
Silver medal – second place	2011 Deer Valley	Ski cross

Julia Murray (born December 23, 1988) is a Canadian retired freestyle skier and resides in Whistler, British Columbia. Murray was a member of the Canadian national ski cross team for 6 years. She was a FIS World Championships silver medalist in 2011. She competed in the 2010 Olympic Winter Games for the debut of Ski Cross and came 12th with an injured knee. As a result of her knee injuries, Murray retired from competitive sport in 2012.

== Personal ==
Murray's parents were both members of Canadian national ski teams. Her father was Dave Murray one of the original Crazy Canucks who were famous on the downhill ski circuit in the 70s and 80s. Murray's mother was Stephanie Sloan a three time world champion in freestyle skiing. Sloan competed in all three disciplines of Moguls, Aerials, and Ski Ballet. When Murray was 22 months old, her father died from skin cancer. Murray started her own superfood cereal business, Jules Fuel Whistler Superfood, and is studying to become a Holistic Nutritionist. She started the Ski with An Olympian program with Whistler Blackcomb.

In 2018, Murray married fellow Canadian freestyle skier Davey Barr.

== Career ==
She began her young career with World Cup starts where she finished the 2008–09 World Cup tour 6th and ended up fourth in the 09-10 World Cup.

Murray was a member of the Canadian Olympic team that took place in Vancouver near her hometown of Whistler. One week before Winter X Games XIV Julia Murray suffered a grade 1 tear of her medial collateral ligament and a tear of her medial meniscus during training. This caused her to miss the X Games although she did attend and watched as national teammates Ashleigh McIvor and Kelsey Serwa finished second and third. It was unknown whether or not she would attend the Olympics as a result of the injury. On Tuesday February 2, 2010 Murray underwent arthroscopic surgery and stated that she believed that she will recover in time to race in the ski cross events at the Olympics.

At the Olympics Murray qualified for the quarter-finals, however she was skiing in obvious discomfort and failed to qualify for the semi-finals. After the race she told CTV "My knee did things I did not think it could do, and it hurt quite a bit".

Over the course of the next season Murray still struggled with her injured knee. She did achieve success in spite of this when she won the silver medal at the 2011 World Championships, finishing second behind teammate Serwa. However a second knee injury put her out for the year and from the 2011–12 season. Murray took the time off to properly recuperate and spend some time on her education, she was worried that she had rushed back to early on the last injury, thus she wanted to be one hundred percent sure she was ready when she returned from her second injury.

Due to the injuries suffered during her young career, Murray decided to retire in June 2012 at the age of 23. McIvor, her teammate and Olympic gold medalist also retired later that year as a result of injuries.
