= Ophélie David =

French freestyle skier

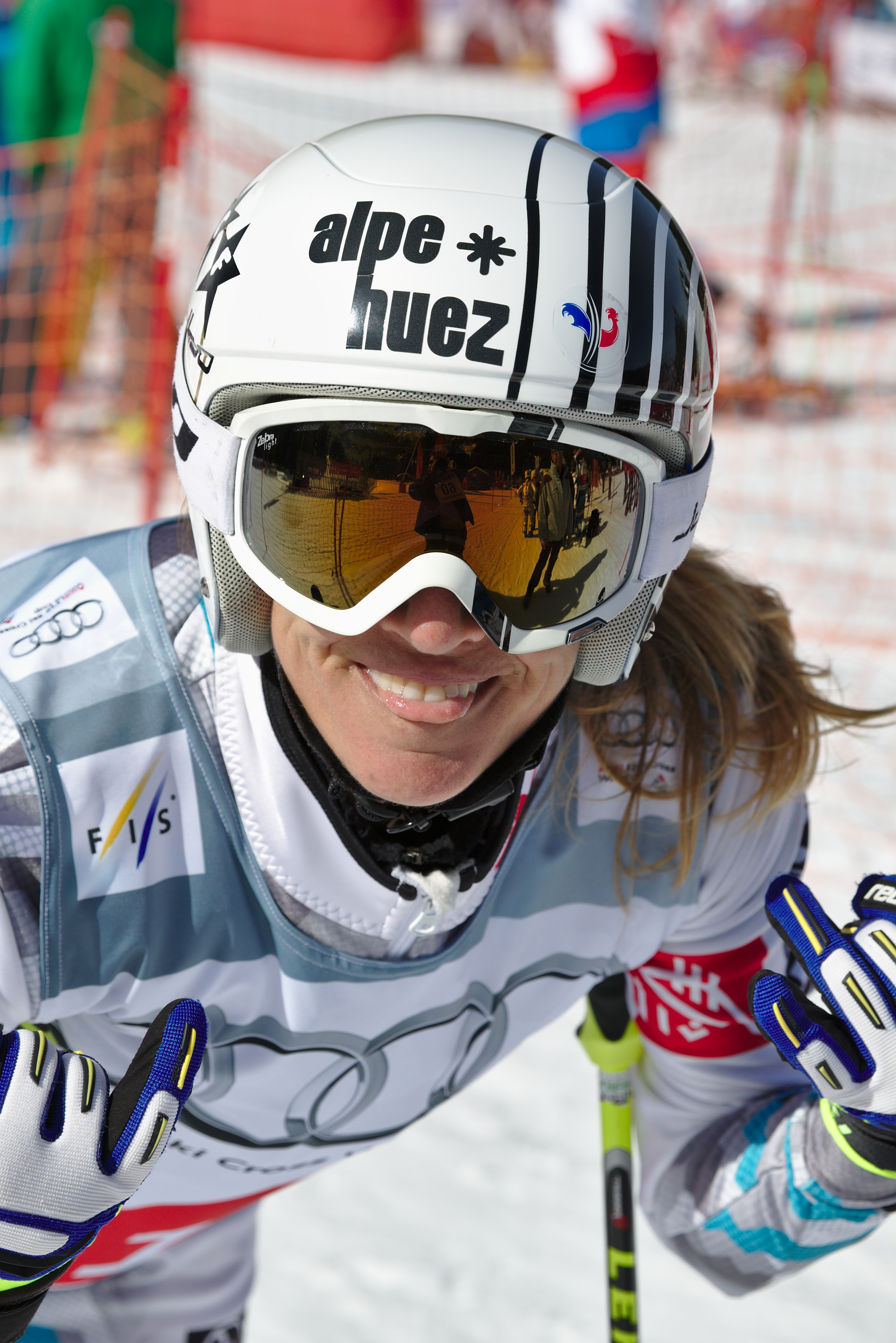
- Ophélie David in 2015

Personal information
- Nationality: France
- Born: 6 July 1976 (age 50) Cucq, France

Sport
- Sport: Skiing
- Club: SC Alpe d'Huez

World Cup career
- Seasons: 16 – (2003–2018)
- Indiv. starts: 128
- Indiv. podiums: 64
- Indiv. wins: 26
- Overall titles: 3 – (2006, 2008, 2009)
- Discipline titles: 7 – Ski cross (2004, 2005, 2006, 2007, 2008, 2009, 2010)
Medal record
Women's freestyle skiing
Representing France
World Championships
| Gold medal – first place | 2007 Madonna di Campiglio | Ski cross |
| Silver medal – second place | 2015 Kreischberg | Ski cross |
| Bronze medal – third place | 2005 Ruka | Ski cross |
| Bronze medal – third place | 2013 Voss | Ski cross |
| Bronze medal – third place | 2017 Sierra Nevada | Ski cross |
Winter X Games
| Gold medal – first place | 2010 Aspen | Ski cross |
| Gold medal – first place | 2009 Aspen | Ski cross |
| Gold medal – first place | 2008 Aspen | Ski cross |
| Gold medal – first place | 2007 Aspen | Ski cross |
| Silver medal – second place | 2011 Aspen | Ski cross |

Ophélie David (née Rácz, born 6 July 1976) is a retired French freestyle skier who specialized in ski cross, an event in which she has won a world championship and four consecutive Winter X Games, as well as having previously been ranked number one in the world.

David began her career as an alpine skier, competing for Hungary at the 1994 Winter Olympics in both the slalom and the combined, both of which she failed to finish. David was able to compete for Hungary because her father, János Rácz, held Hungarian citizenship and had competed for that country in basketball at the 1964 Summer Olympics.

David qualified to compete in the inaugural Winter Olympic Ski Cross race in Vancouver. She was considered the odds-on favorite for gold due to her long-time dominance in the discipline, but crashed out in the quarterfinals and was placed ninth. She finished in fourth position at Sochi after she fell in the final.

== Personal life ==
David grew up on the island of Corsica, where her retired parents still reside.

She is married to Phil David and they have a daughter named Lilou. The family is very close, making frequent use of Skype while David traveled for competitions.

Her hobbies include recreational gymnastics, basketball, windsurfing, traveling, painting, books, and cinema. She is also a competitive mountain biker, her biggest win being the 2008 Megavalanche race. During the summer, she is involved with sports camps for children, and during the winter is a ski instructor.

She speaks French and English.
