= Nikolai Sazonov =

Russian stage actor (1843–1902)

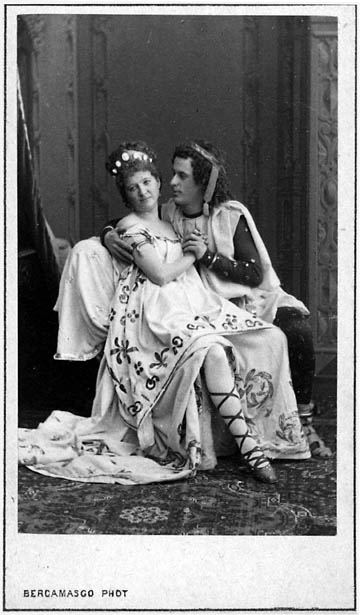
Nikolai Sazonov as Paris in Helen of Troy

Nikolai Fyodorovich Sazonov (Russian: Николай Фёдорович Сазонов; 2 May 1843, in Saint Petersburg – 4 January 1902, in Saint Petersburg) was a Russian stage actor, associated with the Alexandrinsky Theatre in Saint Petersburg. Having made his stage debut in 1864, Sazonov soon became one of Alexandrinka's leading actors, who excelled mainly in operettas. Starting from the mid-1870s, he became involved in a more serious repertoire, and was lauded for his parts (in all, 25 of them) in the plays by Alexander Ostrovsky. He was the first performer of the part of Trigorin in Anton Chekhov's The Seagull.

The writer Sophia Smirnova (1852–1921) was his wife.
