= Julia Eichinger =

German freestyle skier (born 1992)

Personal information
- Born: 28 December 1992 (age 32)

Sport
- Country: Germany
- Sport: freestyle skiing
- Event: ski cross

Julia Eichinger (born 28 December 1992) is a German freestyle skier.

She competed in the 2018 Winter Olympics, in ski cross.

She participated in the 2015 FIS Freestyle World Ski Championships.
