= Andrea Limbacher =

Austrian freestyle skier

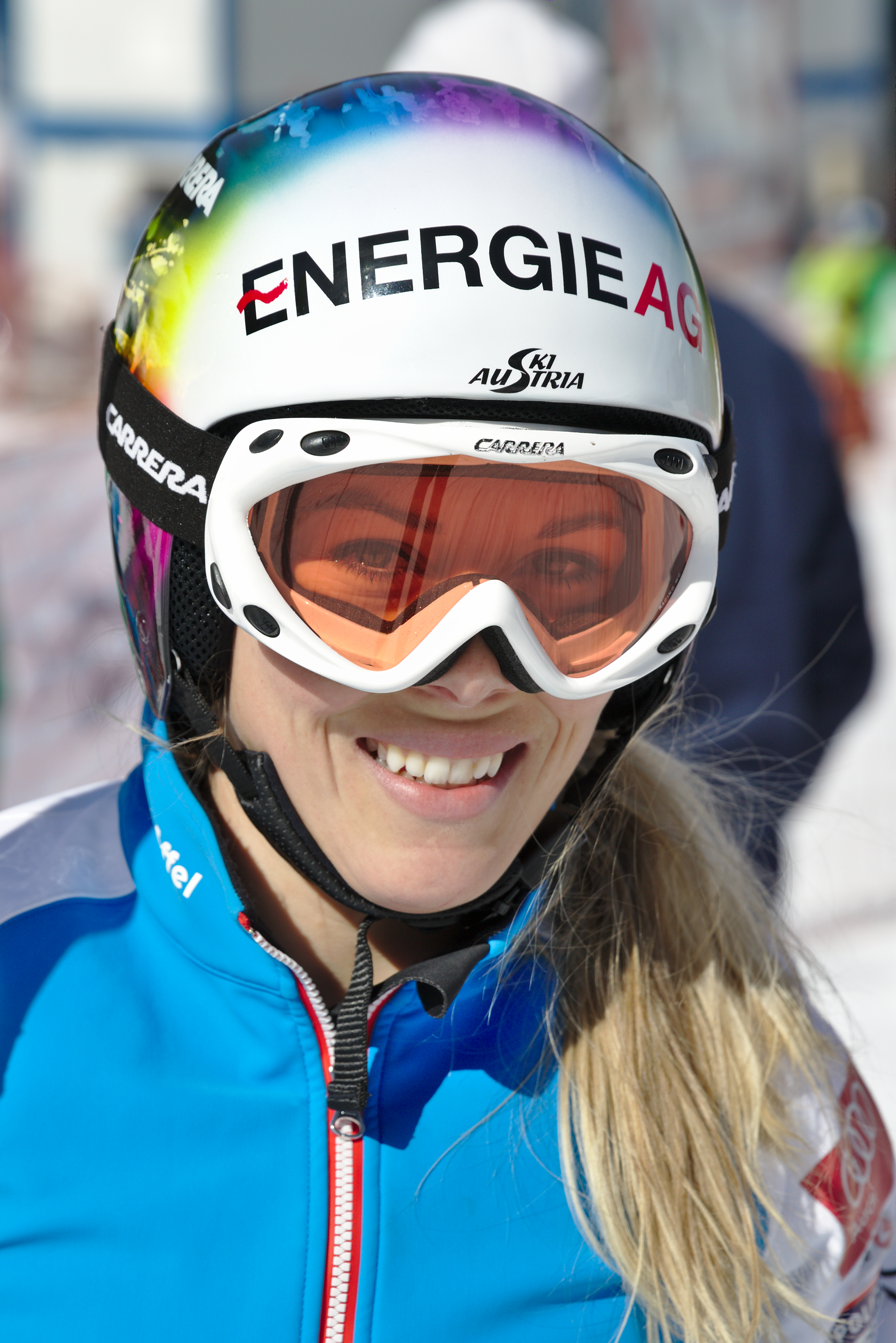
- Limbacher in 2015

Personal information
- Nationality: Austria
- Born: 25 July 1989 (age 36) Bad Ischl, Austria

Sport
- Sport: Skiing
- Club: ASKÖ Dachstein West Bad Goisern

World Cup career
- Seasons: 11 – (2010–2016, 2018–2020, 2022–present)
- Indiv. starts: 112
- Indiv. podiums: 16
- Indiv. wins: 4
- Team starts: 1
- Team podiums: 0
- Overall titles: 0 – (16th in 2016)
- Discipline titles: 0
Medal record
Women's freestyle skiing
Representing Austria
World Championships
Gold medal – first place	2015 Kreischberg	Ski cross
- Updated on 25 January 2023

Andrea Limbacher (born 25 July 1989) is an Austrian freestyle skier, specializing in ski cross.

Limbacher competed at the 2010 Winter Olympics for Austria. She placed 23rd in the qualifying round in ski cross to advance to the knockout stages. She did not finish her first round heat, failing to advance.

As of April 2013, her only finish at the World Championships finishing 23rd, in 2011.

Limbacher made her World Cup debut in December 2009. As of April 2013, she has two World Cup victories, the first coming at Bischofswiesen in 2011/12. Her best World Cup overall finish in ski cross is 5th, in 2011/12.

== World Cup podiums ==
Date	Location	Rank	Event
11 January 2012	Alpe d'Huez	3rd place, bronze medalist(s)	Ski cross
25 February 2012	Bischofswiesen	1st place, gold medalist(s)	Ski cross
19 December 2012	Val Thorens	3rd place, bronze medalist(s)	Ski cross
12 January 2013	Les Contamines	1st place, gold medalist(s)	Ski cross
