= Chloé Georges =

French acrobatic skier

Chloé Georges (born 1 October 1980) is a French acrobatic skier, specialised in ski cross. She is 1.64 m (5 ft 5 in) tall and skis at the club at Courchevel. She took part in the 2010 Winter Olympics where she finished 28th in qualification for the ski cross.

In 2009, Georges won two gold medals in the Europa Cup ski cross competition, and a silver medal at the National Championships held at Sierra Nevada.

In 2010, she won a bronze medal at the National Championships held at Megève.
