= Mitchey Greig =

New Zealand freestyle skier

Michelle "Mitchey" Greig (born 4 October 1988) is a freestyle skier from New Zealand. In the 2010 Winter Olympics at Vancouver, she came 30th in the woman's ski cross.
