= Marion Josserand =

French freestyle skier (born 1986)

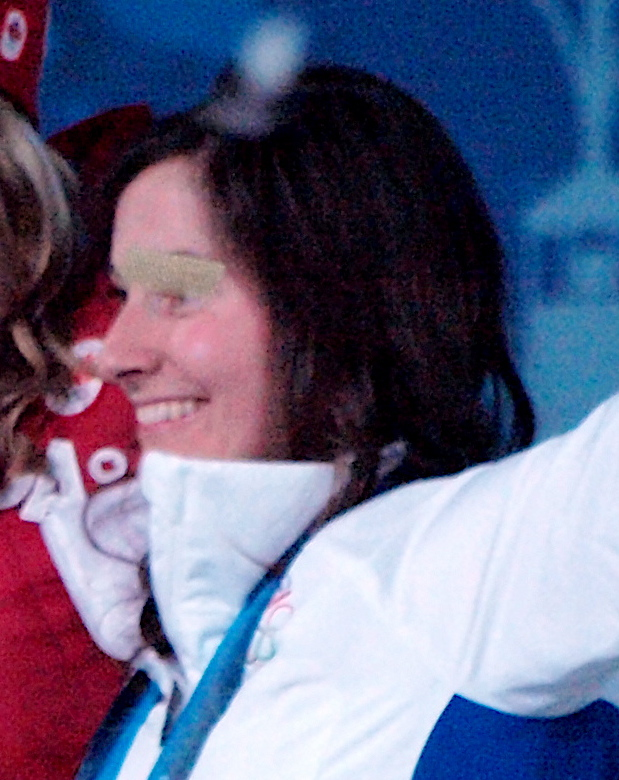
- Josserand at the 2010 Winter Olympics

Personal information
- Born: 6 October 1986 (age 39) Saint-Martin-d'Hères, France

Sport
- Sport: Skiing
Medal record
Women's ski cross
Representing France
Bronze medal – third place	2010 Vancouver	Ski cross

Marion Josserand (French pronunciation: [maʁjɔ̃ ʒɔsʁɑ̃]; born 6 October 1986) is a French retired Olympic athlete in ski cross. She won a bronze medal at the 2010 Winter Olympics in Vancouver in the women's ski cross.

== Honours ==
- Knight of the Ordre national du Mérite (2010)
