= Emily Sarsfield =

British freestyle skier

Emily Sarsfield (born 30 June 1983) is a British freestyle skier who has been selected to participate in the 2018 Winter Olympics.

She is from Durham. She started skiing on holidays aged three, and began to compete on the dry ski slope at Sunderland when she was 12. After participating in alpine skiing events she turned to ski cross, coming sixth in her first competition at the World University Games in Austria.

She graduated from Loughborough University in 2005.

Because of a bad accident in 2009 she missed the 2010 Olympics, and she was not selected for the 2014 Olympics, although she unsuccessfully challenged her non-selection.

Sarsfield commentated on the Skier Cross for TNT Sports was co-host of The Ski Podcast during the Milano-Cortina 2026 Winter Olympics.
