= Danielle Poleschuk =

Canadian freestyle skier

Personal information
- Born: 23 January 1986 (age 40) Winnipeg, Manitoba, Canada
- Height: 165 cm (65 in)

Sport
- Sport: Skiing
- Club: Fernie Alpine Ski Team; Fernie, British Columbia
- Updated on 19 February 2010

Danielle Poleschuk (born 23 January 1986 in Winnipeg, Manitoba) is a Canadian freestyle skier.

She competed at the 2010 Winter Olympics in Vancouver in the women's ski cross competition and was eliminated in the 1/8 round.

Poleschuk was a Calgary resident as of early 2010.
