= Jenny Owens =

Australian skier

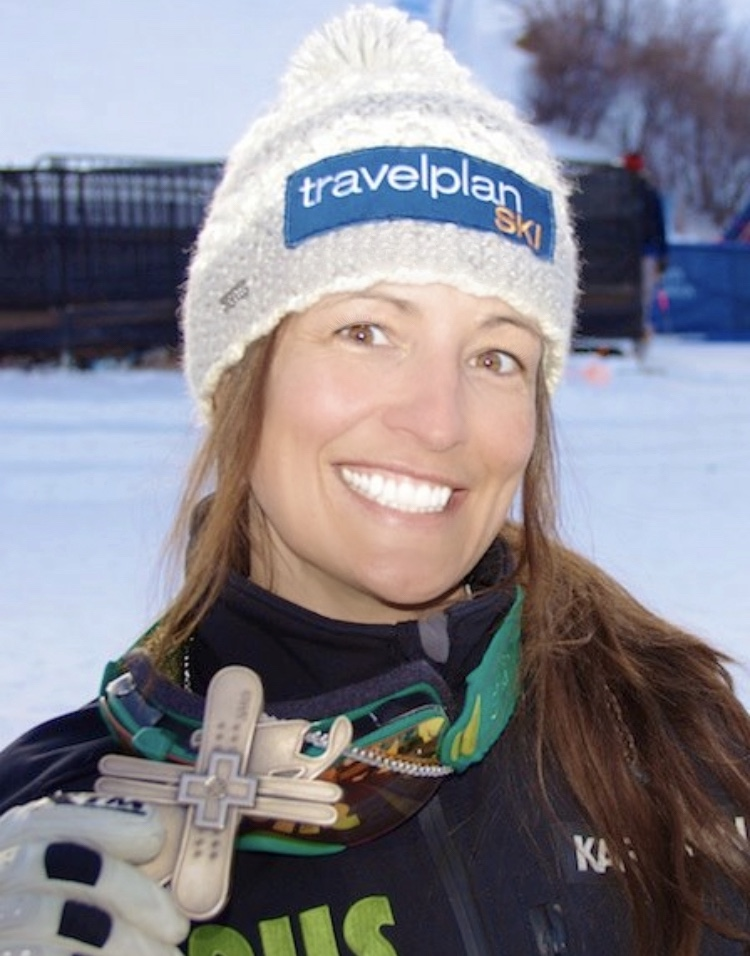
- Owens at the Winter X Games in 2012

Personal information
- Born: 17 May 1978 (age 48) Sydney, Australia
- Height: 1.68 m (5 ft 6 in)
- Weight: 65 kg (143 lb; 10.2 st)
- Website: www.jennyowens.com

Sport
- Country: Australia
- Sport: Alpine skiing, Freestyle skiing
- Events: Downhill, Super-G, Giant slalom, Ski cross
Medal record
Representing Australia
Women's freestyle skiing
X Games
| Bronze medal – third place | 2012 Aspen | Skier X |
FIS Freestyle Skiing World Cup
| Bronze medal – third place | Blue Mountain 2011 | Ski cross |
| Silver medal – second place | Lake Placid 2009 | Ski cross |
| Bronze medal – third place | Krieschberg 2008 | Ski cross |
| Silver medal – second place | Flaine 2008 | Ski cross |

Jenny Owens (born 17 May 1978) is an Australian alpine and freestyle skier, who competed in multiple Winter Olympic Games, including 2002, 2010, and 2014 Games. She competed at the age of 35 in Sochi which makes her the oldest female to ever compete for Australia at the Winter Olympics. It is the same age as the oldest male to compete for Australia at the Winter Olympics, alongside Frank Prijonda, who represented Australia at the 1956 Olympics in Cortina. Owens also competed in the FIS Alpine World Ski Championships twice and the FIS Freestyle World Ski Championships twice. She competed for six years on the FIS Alpine Ski World Cup tour and nine years on FIS Freestyle Skiing World Cup. She has competed in four Winter X Games, winning the bronze medal in the SkierX in 2012. Owens was a member of the Australian alpine team for seven years, followed by nine years as a member of the ski cross team.

== Skiing career ==
Owens made her Alpine World Cup debut in St Moritz on 17 December 1999. She also collected her first World Cup points (top-30 finish in a race) at this event.

Owens struggled to make the top 30 consistently and did not score any more World Cup points until 21 December 2001, again in St Moritz. Owens' highest placing on the World Cup Alpine tour was 17th in Saalbach-Hinterglemm.

Owens competed in alpine skiing for 14 years, skiing in the 2002 Winter Olympics in Salt Lake City and in two world championships, St Anton 2001 and St Moritz 2003, before retiring from alpine racing in 2004. The following year, Owens decided to make a comeback in order to compete in the new Olympic event of ski cross.

While Owens made the podium on several occasions during her World Cup ski cross career, she suffered several injuries prior to the 2010 Winter Olympics and underwent two knee surgeries in the lead-up to the Games, the second of which was only four weeks beforehand. Owens placed 13th in Vancouver, which was immediately followed by a second knee reconstruction.

Owens returned to the ski cross tour in 2011, collecting a bronze medal at the 2010–11 FIS Freestyle Skiing World Cup in Canada, and finishing 5th at the FIS Freestyle World Ski Championships 2011. The following year, she received bronze at the 2012 Winter X Games.

Owens competed at her third Olympics in Sochi, retiring after a 12th place finish in freestyle skiing.

== Olympics ==
=== Sochi 2014 – Freestyle ===
- Finished 12th in the Ski cross

=== Vancouver 2010 – Freestyle ===
- Finished 13th in the Ski cross

=== Salt Lake 2002 – Alpine ===
- Finished 9th in the combined
- Finished 29th in the downhill
- Finished 28th in the super-G
- Did not finish in giant slalom
- Did not start in slalom

== World Championships ==
=== Voss NOR 2013 – Freestyle ===
- DNF in ski cross

=== Deer Valley USA 2011 – Freestyle ===
- 5th position in ski cross

=== Inawashiro JPN 2009 – Freestyle ===
- 15th position in ski cross

=== St Moritz SUI 2003 – Alpine ===
- DNF downhill due to injury

=== St Anton AUT 2001 – Alpine ===
- 31 – Downhill
- 34 – Super-G
- 31 – Giant slalom

== World Cup ==
Owens has had two silver and two bronze medals on the Freestyle World Cup tour to date in her career.

Owens has been one of the top ranked ski cross athletes since her debut in 2005. In 2009–2010 she had numerous injuries and missed eight of the scheduled world cups and nearly missed the Vancouver 2010 Olympics.

Owens competed on the Alpine World Cup for six years, with placement in the top 30 several times in the Combined and Downhill events.

== Winter X Games ==
- Invitation 2012 – qualified 4th = BRONZE
- Invitation 2008 – qualified 9th = 4th in semi, did not start small finals
- Invitation 2007 – qualified 12th = 3rd in semi, DNF finals
- Invitation 2005 – qualified 3rd = injured herself in training prior to the finals
