= Heidi Zacher =

German freestyle skier

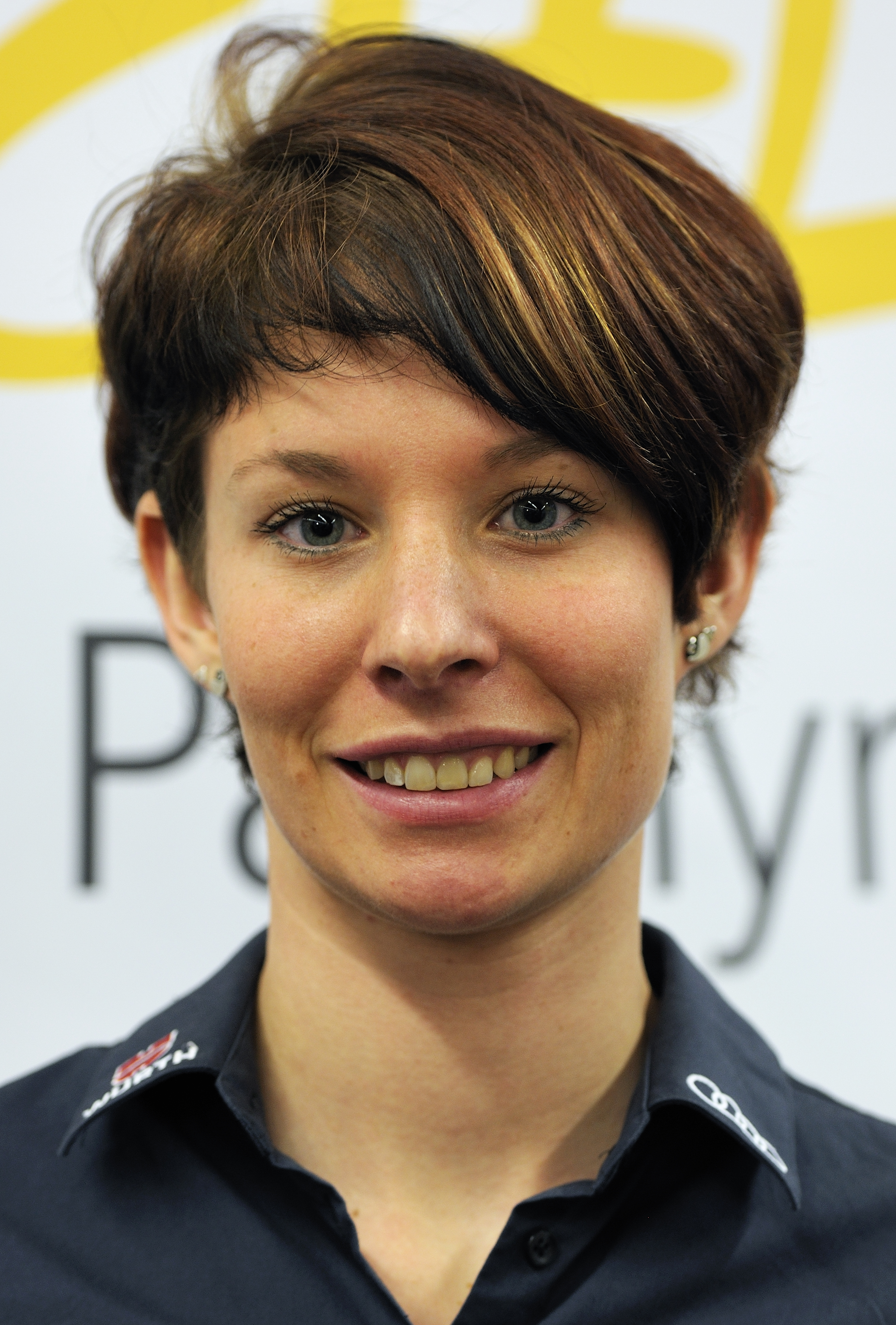

Personal information
- Nationality: Germany
- Born: March 17, 1988 Bad Tölz, West Germany

Sport
- Sport: Skiing
- Club: SC Lenggries

World Cup career
- Seasons: 12 – (2009–2020)
- Indiv. starts: 95
- Indiv. podiums: 18
- Indiv. wins: 7
- Overall titles: 0 – (6th in 2011)
- Discipline titles: 0

Heidi Zacher (born March 17, 1988) is a German freestyle skier, specializing in ski cross.

Zacher competed at the 2010 Winter Olympics for Germany. She placed 19th in the qualifying round in ski cross, to advance to the knockout stages. She did not finish her first round heat, failing to advance.

As of April 2013, her best finish at the World Championships is 7th, in 2011.

Zacher made her World Cup debut in January 2009. As of April 2013, she has one World Cup victory, coming at St. Johann in 2010/11. She also has eighteen other World Cup podium finishes. Her best World Cup overall finish in ski cross is 2nd, in 2010/11.

== World Cup podiums ==
Date	Location	Rank	Event
19 December 2010	Innichen/San Candido	3rd place, bronze medalist(s)	Ski cross
7 January 2011	St. Johann	1st place, gold medalist(s)	Ski cross
29 January 2011	Grasgehren	2nd place, silver medalist(s)	Ski cross
3 March 2011	Grindelwald	3rd place, bronze medalist(s)	Ski cross
22 December 2013	Innichen/San Candido	3rd place, bronze medalist(s)	Ski cross
19 December 2015	Innichen/San Candido	1st place, gold medalist(s)	Ski cross
17 January 2016	Watles, ITA	3rd place, bronze medalist(s)	Ski cross
17 December 2016	Montafon	3rd place, bronze medalist(s)	Ski cross
21 December 2016	Innichen/San Candido	1st place, gold medalist(s)	Ski cross
22 December 2016	Innichen/San Candido	1st place, gold medalist(s)	Ski cross
14 January 2017	Watles, ITA	3rd place, bronze medalist(s)	Ski cross
4 February 2017	Feldberg	1st place, gold medalist(s)	Ski cross
7 December 2017	Val Thorens	2nd place, silver medalist(s)	Ski cross
12 December 2017	Arosa	2nd place, silver medalist(s)	Ski cross
15 December 2017	Montafon	2nd place, silver medalist(s)	Ski cross
21 December 2017	Innichen/San Candido	1st place, gold medalist(s)	Ski cross
14 January 2018	Idre Fjall	3rd place, bronze medalist(s)	Ski cross
19 January 2018	Idre Fjall	1st place, gold medalist(s)	Ski cross
