= Sami Kennedy-Sim =

Australian freestyle skier (born 1988)

Sami Kennedy
Personal information
- Born: Samantha Kennedy; 26 May 1988 (age 38) Mona Vale, New South Wales, Australia
- Height: 170 cm (5 ft 7 in)
- Weight: 67 kg (148 lb)
- Website: www.samikennedysim.com

Sport
- Country: Australia
- Sport: Freestyle skiing

Sami Kennedy (born 26 May 1988) is an Australian freestyle skier.

== Skiing career ==
After two podium finishes on the Ski Cross Europa Cup circuit, Kennedy made her debut on the FIS Freestyle Skiing World Cups in Deer Valley Resort, USA in 2008 finishing 20th. Kennedy has been competing on the FIS Freestyle Skiing World Cup tour for three years placing in the top 5 on the World Cup tour. In 2011, she competed at the FIS Freestyle World Ski Championships. Kennedy, finished her 2012 season being ranked 12th in the world. She competed for Australia at the 2014 Winter Olympics in the ski cross events.

Sami married Cross Country Olympian Ben Sim in April 2011. Before the 2014 Winter Olympics in Sochi, she survived a stroke.

Kennedy had an eighth place finish at the 2022 Winter Olympics and was named as Australia's flagbearer during the closing ceremony.
