= Karolina Riemen =

Polish freestyle skier

Personal information
- Born: 19 August 1988 (age 37) Tuchów, Poland

Sport
- Sport: Skiing

World Cup career
- Indiv. podiums: 2
- Updated on 13 December 2016

Karolina Riemen (born 19 August 1988) is a Polish freestyle skier, specializing in ski cross, and a former alpine skier.

Riemen competed at the 2010 Winter Olympics for Poland. She placed 26th in the qualifying round in ski cross, to advance to the knockout stages. She finished second in her first round heat to make the quarterfinals. She then finished fourth in her quarterfinal race, and did not advance.

As of April 2013, her best finish at the World Championships is 6th, in 2011.

Riemen made her World Cup debut in January 2008. Her best World Cup overall finish in ski cross is 11th, in 2012/13.

== World Cup podiums ==
Date	Location	Rank	Event
16 March 2013	Are	3rd place, bronze medalist(s)	Ski cross
13 December 2016	Arosa	2nd place, silver medalist(s)	Ski cross
