= Katrin Ofner =

Austrian freestyle skier (born 1990)

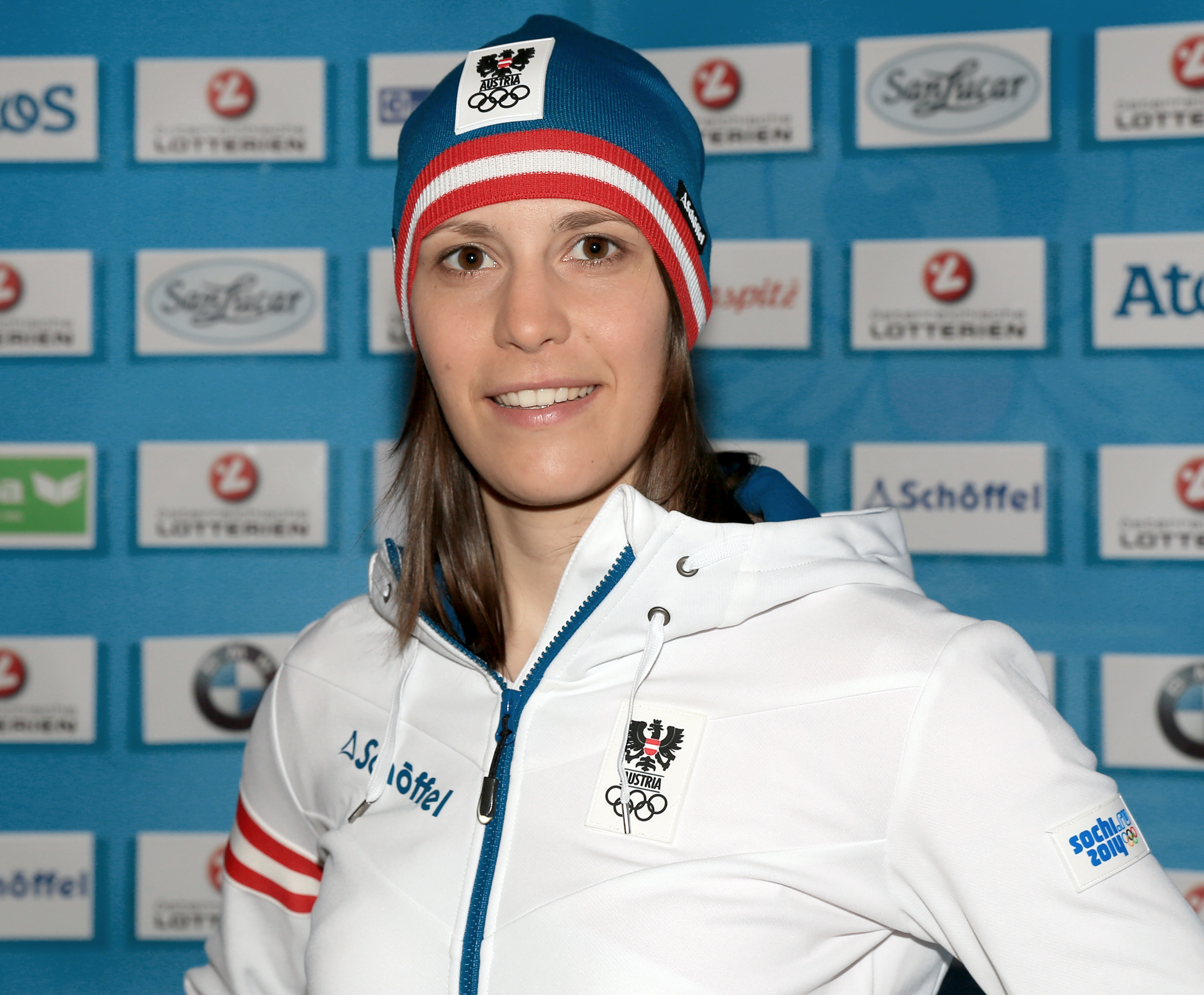
- Ofner in 2014

Personal information
- Nationality: Austria
- Born: 5 March 1990 (age 36) Klagenfurt, Austria
- Height: 170 cm (5 ft 7 in)

Sport
- Sport: Skiing
- Club: SC Obdach

World Cup career
- Seasons: 14 – (2008–2018, 2020–present)
- Indiv. starts: 154
- Indiv. podiums: 13
- Indiv. wins: 1
- Team starts: 2
- Team podiums: 0
- Overall titles: 0 – (16th in 2015)
- Discipline titles: 0
Medal record
Women's freestyle skiing
Representing Austria
World Championships
Silver medal – second place	2023 Bakuriani	Ski cross
Junior World Championships
Silver medal – second place	2010 Otago	Ski cross
- Updated on 25 January 2023

Katrin Ofner (born 5 March 1990) is an Austrian freestyle skier, specializing in ski cross.

== Career ==
Ofner competed at the 2010 Winter Olympics for Austria. She placed 22nd in the qualifying round in ski cross, to advance to the knockout stages. She finished third in her first round heat, failing to advance.

As of April 2013, her best finish at the World Championships is 4th, in 2011.

Ofner made her World Cup debut in January 2008. As of April 2013, she has three World Cup podium finishes, the best a second place, coming at Blue Mountain in 2011/12. Her best World Cup overall finish in ski cross is 7th, in 2011/12.

She also competed at the 2014 Winter Olympics, 2018 Winter Olympics, and 2022 Winter Olympics.

== World Cup podiums ==
Date	Location	Rank	Event
22 February 2008	Sierra Nevada	3rd place, bronze medalist(s)	Ski cross
10 January 2009	Les Contamines	3rd place, bronze medalist(s)	Ski cross
3 February 2012	Blue Mountain	2nd place, silver medalist(s)	Ski cross
