= Hedda Berntsen =

Norwegian sportsperson (born 1976)

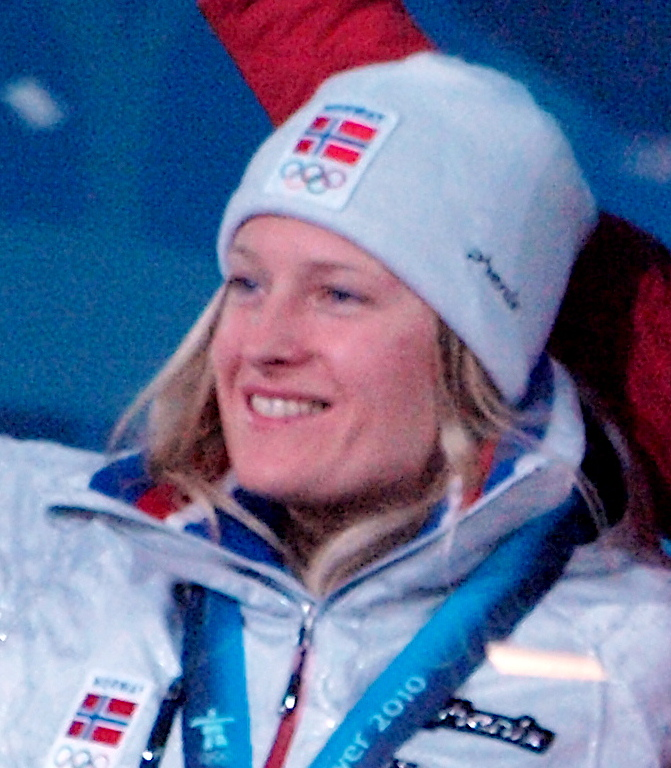
- Hedda Berntsen in 2010

Personal information
- Nationality: Norwegian
- Born: 24 April 1976 (age 50)

Sport
- Sport: Telemark skiing; Alpine skiing; Freestyle skiing
Medal record
Women's freestyle skiing
Representing Norway
Olympic Games
Silver medal – second place	2010 Vancouver	Ski cross
X Games
Silver medal – second place	2008 Aspen	Ski cross
Silver medal – second place	2012 Aspen	Ski cross
Women's telemark skiing
World Championships
Gold medal – first place	1997 Meiringen	Classic
Women's alpine skiing
World Championships
Bronze medal – third place	2001 St. Anton	Slalom skiing

Hedda Berntsen (born 24 April 1976) is a Norwegian sportsperson who has competed internationally in telemark skiing, alpine skiing, freestyle skiing and skicross. She is the world champion in Telemark classic from 1997. She later concentrated on the alpine slalom, her career peaking in the 2000–01 season with consistent performances in the World Cup as well as a bronze medal at the 2001 World Championships. She later switched to skicross, receiving a silver medal at the 2008 Winter X Games. In the Vancouver Winter Olympics on 23 February 2010, she won the silver medal in the women's skicross competition.

== Background ==
Hedda Berntsen hails from Filtvet, and is the older sister of freestyle skier Ingrid Berntsen. She studied at Middlebury College from 1995 to 1999. Her first international sporting triumph was the gold medal in the classic telemark event at the 1997 World Championships.

== Career ==
=== Alpine skiing ===
In alpine skiing she had made her international debut in December 1995, when competing in a FIS Race in Bjorli. Her World Cup debut came many years later, in February 2000, when she finished 23rd in slalom in Santa Caterina. She followed up with an eleventh place in Åre a week later. She then opened the 2000–01 season with another 11th place, from Park City in November. In December and January she finished among the top 10 in all her World Cup slalom races, the best result being a fifth place from Flachau. Then, at the 2001 World Championships staged in St. Anton, she won a surprising bronze medal. She rounded off the season with two World Cup fifth places.

Berntsen opened the 2001–02 season with a fifth place at Copper Mountain. However, this remained her season's best result as she did not finish half her races, and recorded only an 11th place in Åre in February. Two weeks later she competed in slalom at the 2002 Winter Olympics, but again did not finish the race. However, with both Hedda and Ingrid competing at the same Olympic Games, but in different sports, the sisters were historic in a Norwegian context. Hedda Berntsen then competed in a lot more races the 2002–03 season, but not only in the World Cup circuit. Her season's best was a 12th place in January in Maribor. Then, she achieved mediocre results at the 2003 World Championships staged in St. Moritz, an 18th place in combined being the best placement.

In November 2003, she was dropped from the national alpine skiing team in favor of Lene Løseth. This prompted Berntsen to announce her retirement the next month. She competed sporadically in the World Cup between December 2003 and January 2007, but only actually managed to finish one of 13 races, with a 37th place in January 2006 in St. Moritz.

=== Freestyle skiing ===
Berntsen eventually took up freestyle skiing, specializing in the skicross. She made her World Cup debut in February 2007, finishing ninth in Les Contamines. The next month she finished 10th at the World Championships in Madonna di Campiglio. In the 2007–08 season she opened with a second place in Les Contamines in January. She recorded two additional second places before the end of the season. She also won the silver medal at the Winter X Games XII. In the 2008–09 season she opened with a fifth place in St. Johann in January, and followed up with her first World Cup victory in Les Contamines.
