= Yulia Livinskaya =

Russian freestyle skier

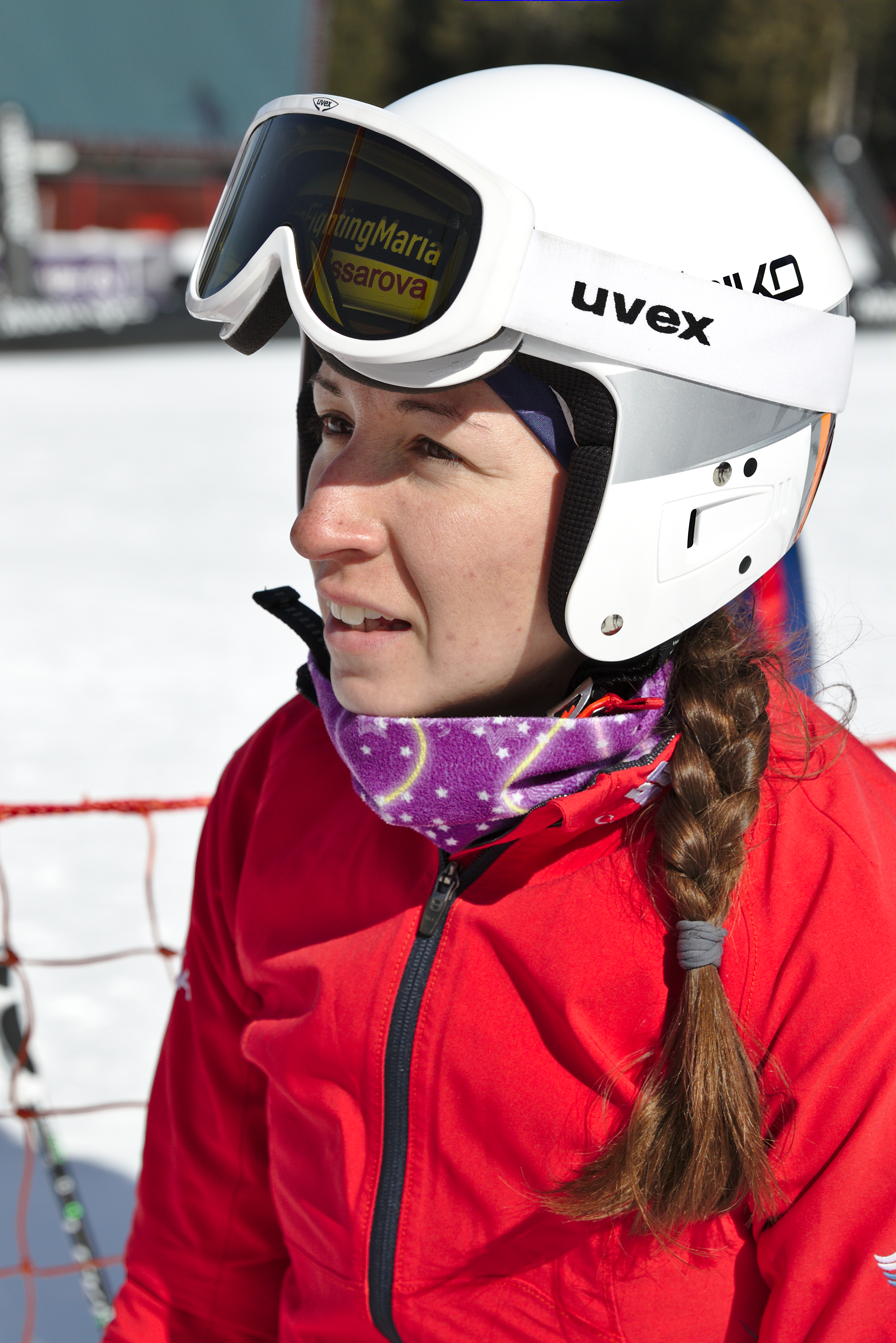
- Livinskaya in 2015

Personal information
- Born: July 31, 1990 (age 35) Tryokhgorny, Russian SSR

Sport
- Sport: Skiing
- Updated on July 31, 2013

Yulia Livinskaya (born July 31, 1990) is a Russian freestyle skier, specializing in ski cross.

Livinskaya competed at the 2010 Winter Olympics for Russia. She placed 32nd in the qualifying round in ski cross, to advance to the knockout stages. She did not finish her first round heat, and did not advance.

As of April 2013, her best finish at the World Championships is 20th, in 2011.

Livinskaya made her World Cup debut in March 2009. As of April 2013, her best finish at a World Cup event is 10th, coming at two events in 2011/12. Her best World Cup overall finish in ski cross is 20th, in 2011/12.
