= Julie Brendengen Jensen =

Norwegian freestyle skier

Julie Brendengen Jensen (born 15 March 1990) is a Norwegian freestyle skier. She represented Norway at the 2010 Winter Olympics in Vancouver, where she placed 8th in the Women's ski cross.

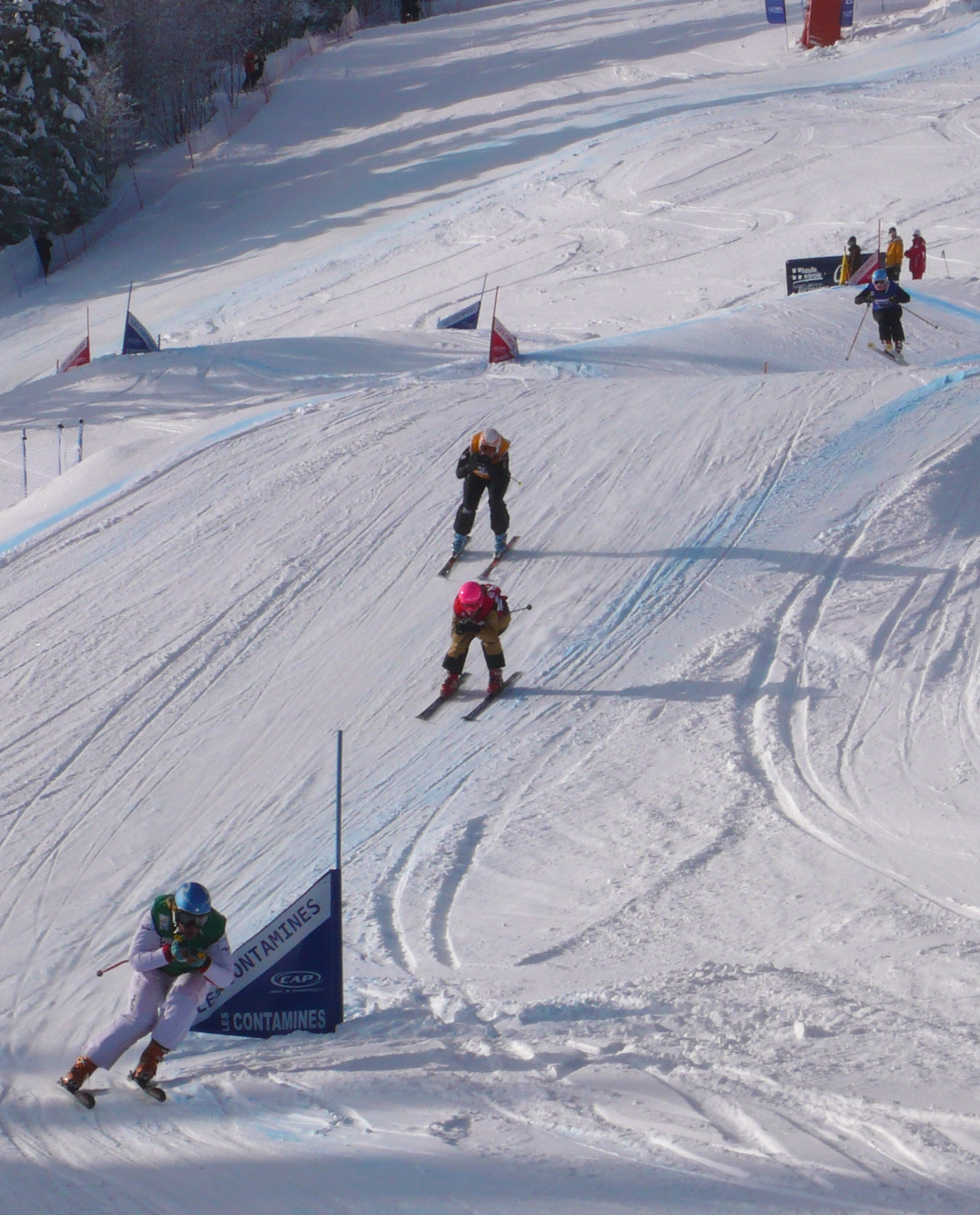
Julie Brendengen Jensen in a World Cup race in 2010
