= Nikol Kučerová =

Czech freestyle skier (born 1989)

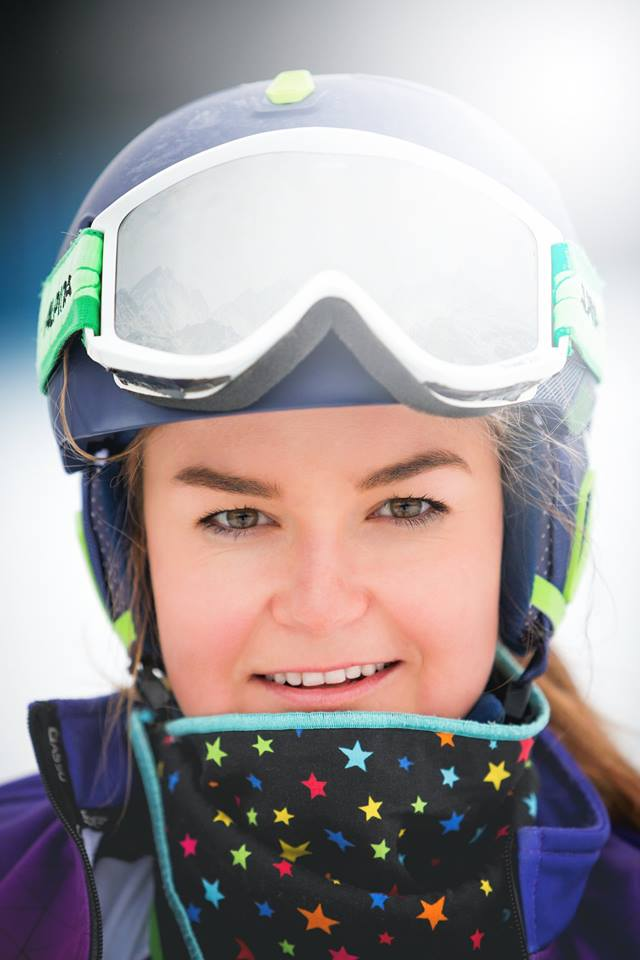

Personal information
- Nationality: Czech
- Born: 23 June 1989 (age 37) Turnov, Czechoslovakia

Sport
- Sport: Skiing

World Cup career
- Indiv. podiums: 1

Nikol Kučerová (born 23 June 1989) is a Czech freestyle skier, specializing in ski cross and alpine skier.

Kučerová competed at the 2014 Winter Olympics for the Czech Republic. She did not finish in the seeding run for the ski cross event. In the first round, she finished third in her heat, failing to advance.

As of September 2015, her best showing at the Freestyle World Championships is 6th, in the 2015 ski cross.

Kučerová made her Freestyle World Cup debut in January 2010. As of September 2015, she has one World Cup podium finish, a bronze medal at Innichen in 2010–11. Her best Freestyle World Cup overall finish in ski cross is 10th, in 2010–11.

== World Cup podiums ==
| Date | Location | Rank | Event |
| 18 December 2010 | Innichen | 3rd place, bronze medalist(s) | Ski Cross |
