= Anna Holmlund =

Swedish freestyle skier (born 1987)

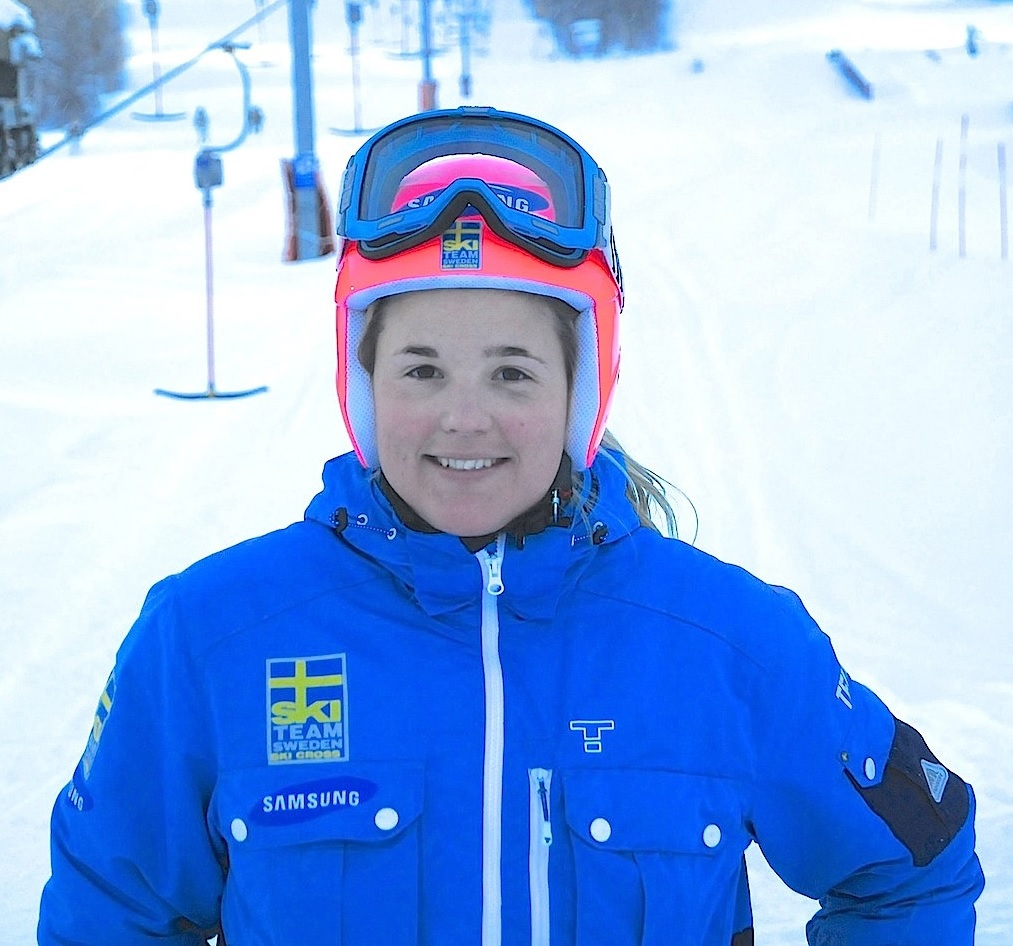
- Anna Holmlund in 2013

Personal information
- Nationality: Sweden
- Born: 3 October 1987 (age 38) Selånger, Sweden

Sport
- Sport: Skiing
- Club: Sundsvalls SLK

World Cup career
- Seasons: 8 – (2009–2011, 2013–2017)
- Indiv. starts: 67
- Indiv. podiums: 33
- Indiv. wins: 19
- Team starts: 0
- Overall titles: 0 – (2nd in 2015, 2016)
- Discipline titles: 3 – Ski cross (2011, 2015, 2016)
Medal record
Representing Sweden
Women's Freestyle skiing
Olympic Games
Bronze medal – third place	2014 Sochi	Ski cross
World Championships
Bronze medal – third place	2011 Deer Valley	Ski cross

Anna Ida Holmlund (born 3 October 1987) is a Swedish former ski cross athlete.

== Career ==
Holmlund won 19 World Cup races and three ski cross World Cups up to 2016. She came sixth at the 2010 Winter Olympics and won the bronze medal at the 2014 Winter Olympics. She won a bronze medal at the 2011 FIS Freestyle World Ski Championships.

During a practice run on 19 December 2016 in Innichen, Holmlund crashed and suffered head injuries with brain hemorrhages and facial fractures, including a diffuse axonal injury. Doctors put her in a medically induced coma in a hospital in Bolzano and a week later she was flown back to Sweden. In May 2017, the Swedish Ski Association announced that Holmlund had regained consciousness and had communicated with and recognised friends and family. In July 2017, she left the Danderyd hospital, where she had been treated, and returned to her hometown of Sundsvall.

In December 2017, Holmlund took her first steps since the accident. She made a return to the ski slopes in February 2018, when she took to the snow in a sit-ski for the first time. In April 2018, she made a return to competition by racing in a biski with the assistance of her brother Kalle: they won the women's class in a downhill race in Åre.

In early November 2018, Holmlund was announced as an ambassador for Stockholm's bid for the 2026 Winter Olympics.

== World Cup podiums ==
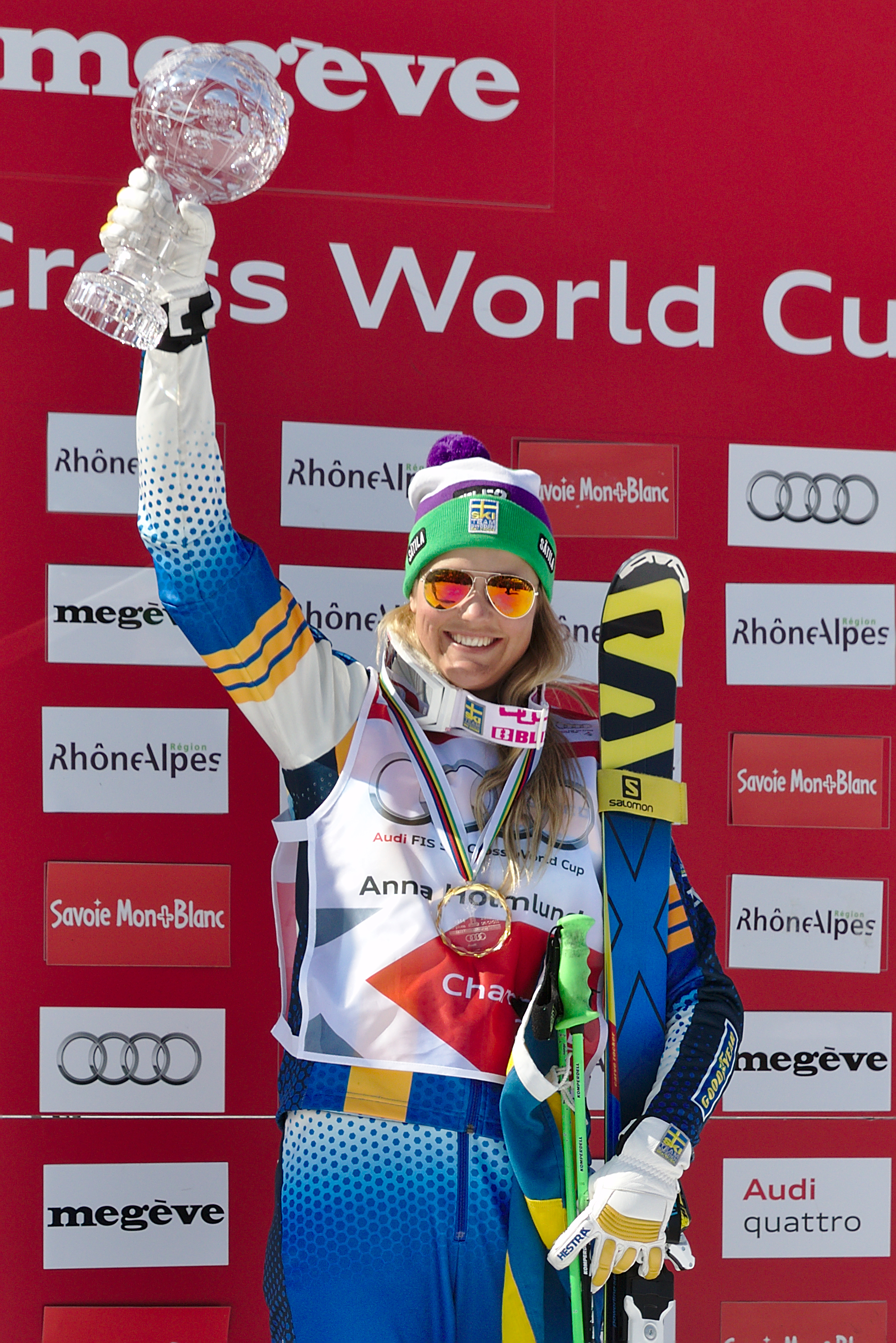
Holmlund at the FIS Ski Cross World Cup Finals, Megève (2015)

Season	Date	Location	Place
2009–2010	21 December 2009	Innichen, Italy	1st
2009–2010	22 December 2009	Innichen, Italy	1st
2009–2010	14 March 2010	Grindelwald, Switzerland	1st
2009–2010	19 March 2010	Sierra Nevada, Spain	1st
2010–2011	18 December 2010	Innichen, Italy	1st
2010–2011	16 January 2011	Les Contamines, France	3rd
2010–2011	29 January 2011	Grasgehren, Germany	1st
2010–2011	6 March 2011	Meiringen, Switzerland	1st
2010–2011	13 March 2011	Branäs, Sweden	1st
2010–2011	19 March 2011	Voss, Norway	1st
2012–2013	8 December 2012	Nakiska, Canada	3rd
2012–2013	13 December 2012	Telluride, United States	3rd
2012–2013	12 January 2013	Les Contamines, France	2nd
2013–2014	21 December 2013	Innichen, Italy	3rd
2014–2015	10 January 2015	Val Thorens, France	2nd
2014–2015	6 February 2015	Arosa, Switzerland	2nd
2014–2015	7 February 2015	Arosa, Switzerland	2nd
2014–2015	15 February 2015	Åre, Sweden	1st
2014–2015	21 February 2015	Tegernsee, Germany	3rd
2014–2015	22 February 2015	Tegernsee, Germany	1st
2014–2015	13 March 2015	Megeve, France	1st
2014–2015	14 March 2015	Megeve, France	1st
2015–2016	5 December 2015	Montafon, Austria	2nd
2015–2016	11 December 2015	Val Thorens, France	1st
2015–2016	12 December 2015	Val Thorens, France	1st
2015–2016	19 December 2015	Innichen, Italy	2nd
2015–2016	16 January 2016	Watles, Italy	1st
2015–2016	17 January 2016	Watles, Italy	2nd
2015–2016	23 January 2016	Nakiska, Alberta, Canada	2nd
2015–2016	13 February 2016	Idre Fjäll, Sweden	1st
2015–2016	28 February 2016	Bokwang/Pyeongchang, South Korea	3rd
2015–2016	4 March 2016	Arosa, Graubünden, Switzerland	1st
2016–2017	10 December 2016	Val Thorens, France	1st
