= Sophia Smirnova =

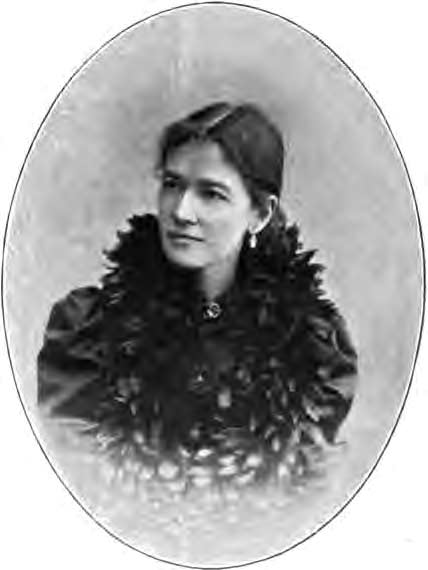
- Born: Sophia Ivanovna Smirnova; 1852; Russian Empire
- Died: 1921 (aged 68–69); Petrograd, Soviet Russia
- Occupations: novelist, publicist, memoirist
- Spouse: Nikolai Sazonov

Sophia Ivanovna Smirnova (Russian: Софья Ивановна Смирнова-Сазонова, also: Smirnova-Sazonova, born 1852, Moscow, Imperial Russia, — died in 1921, Petrograd, Soviet Russia) was a Russian writer, novelist and memoirist.

Having joined in 1870 the staff of Otechestvennye Zapiski magazine, in the course of the next eight years she published in it five novels, including very well received Ogonyok (Огонёк, Small Fire, 1871) and Sol Zemli (Соль земли, Salt of the Earth, 1872). Not only the critics liked them, but some of her better established colleagues too, like Nikolai Leskov and Fyodor Dostoyevsky. The latter, while remaining a good friend, would parody one of her characters, Klavdya Rakitina (from Ogonyok) in his Mikhail Rakitin, of The Brothers Karamazov.

In the 1880s Smirnova stopped writing novels, and concentrated on journalism, writing mostly for Novoye Vremya and Severny Vestnik. She authored three plays, of which Devyaty val (Девятый вал, The Ninth Wave, 1899) was the most successful. Her short stories came out in the Novellas and Stories collection in 1897. "The scale of her talent, her sense of humour and totally male mindset established Smirnova as one of our leading female writers, although it has to be said that the great expectations risen by her first novels failed to materialize," the biographer Semyon Vengerov later opined.

Smirnova left memoirs on her circle of literary and theatre friends, which included Fyodor Dostoyevsky, Nikolai Leskov, Ivan Turgenev, Nikolai Nekrasov, Ivan Goncharov, Alexander Ostrovsky, as well as Fyodor Burdin, Maria Savina and Vera Komissarzhevskaya.

The actor Nikolai Sazonov was her husband.
