= FIS Freestyle World Ski Championships 2011 =

International skiing competition

The 2011 FIS Freestyle World Ski Championships were held at Deer Valley Resort, together with Park City Mountain Resort. The 2011 FIS Freestyle World Championships took place from January 30 until February 7, 2011, and included aerials, moguls, dual moguls and ski cross competitions at Deer Valley Resort and the slopestyle and ski halfpipe competitions at Park City Mountain Resort. Deer Valley previously held the World Championships in 2003.

== Results ==
=== Men's events ===
Event	Gold		Silver		Bronze	
Moguls	Guilbaut Colas; France (FRA)	26.26	Alexandre Bilodeau; Canada (CAN)	25.66	Mikaël Kingsbury; Canada (CAN)	25.57
Dual moguls	Alexandre Bilodeau; Canada (CAN)		Mikaël Kingsbury; Canada (CAN)		Nobuyuki Nishi; Japan (JPN)	
Aerials	Warren Shouldice; Canada (CAN)	253.66	Qi Guangpu; China (CHN)	250.95	Anton Kushnir; Belarus (BLE)	249.63
Halfpipe	Mike Riddle; Canada (CAN)	45.6	Kevin Rolland; France (FRA)	45.2	Simon Dumont; United States (USA)	43.2
Slopestyle	Alex Schlopy; United States (USA)	41.8	Sam Carlson; United States (USA)	41.5	Russell Henshaw; Australia (AUS)	41.2
Ski cross	Christopher Del Bosco; Canada (CAN)		Jouni Pellinen; Finland (FIN)		Andreas Matt; Austria (AUT)	

=== Women's events ===
Event	Gold		Silver		Bronze	
Moguls	Jennifer Heil; Canada (CAN)	24.35	Hannah Kearney; United States (USA)	24.31	Kristi Richards; Canada (CAN)	23.71
Dual moguls	Jennifer Heil; Canada (CAN)		Chloé Dufour-Lapointe; Canada (CAN)		Hannah Kearney; United States (USA)	
Aerials	Shuang Cheng; China (CHN)	188.40	Xu Mengtao; China (CHN)	188.23	Olha Volkova; Ukraine (UKR)	178.59
Halfpipe	Rosalind Groenewoud; Canada (CAN)	44.7	Jen Hudak; United States (USA)	42.1	Keltie Hansen; Canada (CAN)	38.8
Slopestyle	Anna Segal; Australia (AUS)	43.4	Kaya Turski; Canada (CAN)	41.7	Keri Herman; United States (USA)	41.0
Ski cross	Kelsey Serwa; Canada (CAN)		Julia Murray; Canada (CAN)		Anna Holmlund; Sweden (SWE)	

== Medal table ==
* Host nation (United States)

Rank	Nation	Gold	Silver	Bronze	Total
1	Canada (CAN)	8	5	3	16
2	United States (USA)*	1	3	3	7
3	China (CHN)	1	2	0	3
4	France (FRA)	1	1	0	2
5	Australia (AUS)	1	0	1	2
6	Finland (FIN)	0	1	0	1
7	Austria (AUT)	0	0	1	1
7	Belarus (BLR)	0	0	1	1
7	Japan (JPN)	0	0	1	1
7	Sweden (SWE)	0	0	1	1
7	Ukraine (UKR)	0	0	1	1
Totals (11 entries)		12	12	12	36

== Participating nations ==
313 athletes representing 36 countries competed. The British Virgin Islands made its debut.

- Andorra (1)
- Argentina
- Austria
- Australia
- Belarus
- Belgium
- Brazil
- British Virgin Islands (1)
- Canada (39)
- China
- Colombia
- Czech Republic
- Denmark
- Finland
- France
- Germany
- Great Britain
- Ireland
- Italy
- Jamaica
- Japan
- Liechtenstein
- New Zealand
- Norway
- Poland
- Russia
- Slovakia
- Slovenia
- South Africa
- South Korea
- Spain
- Switzerland
- Sweden (8)
- Ukraine
- United States (37)
