= Ski cross =

Type of skiing competition

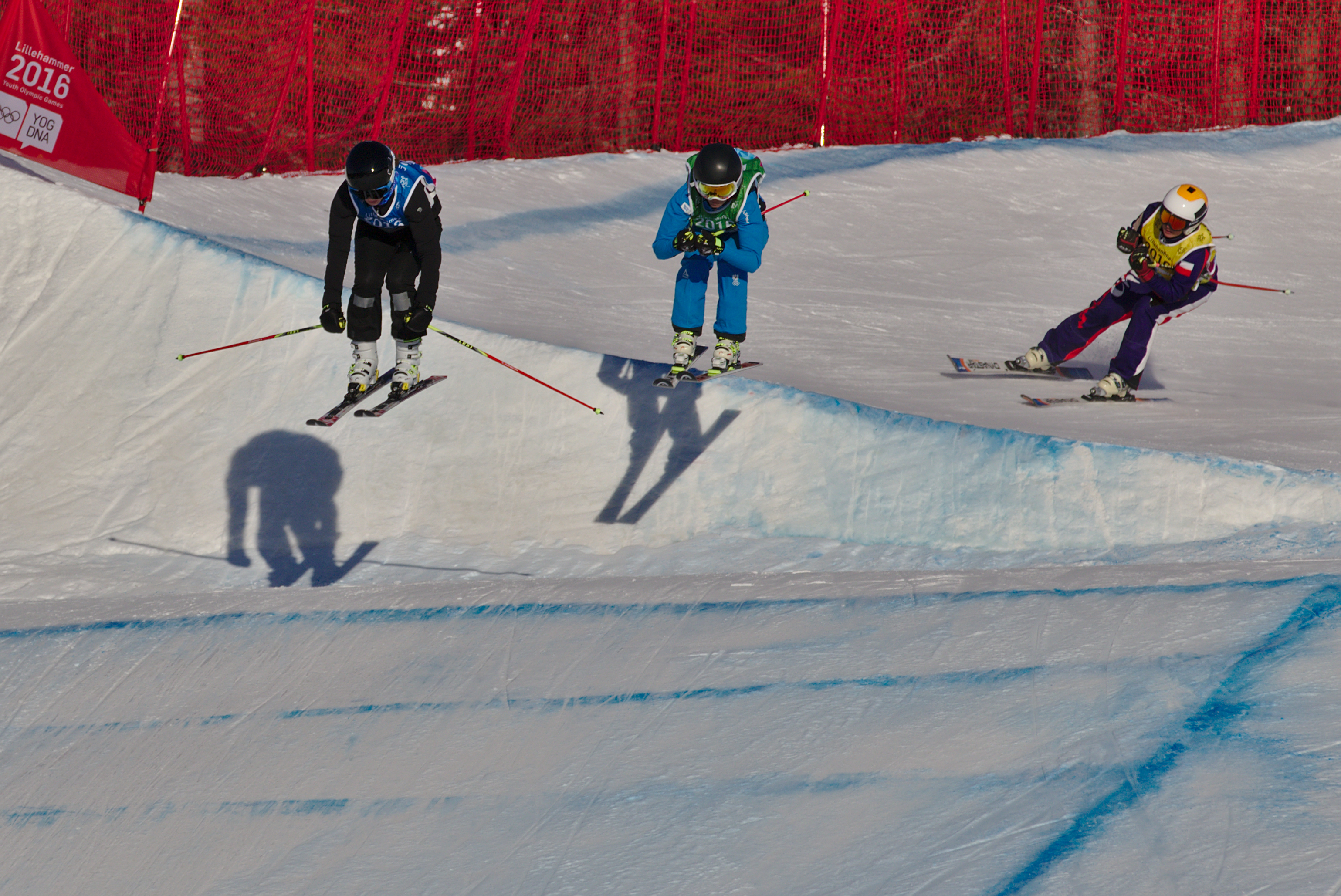
- Ski Cross competitors navigating a jump during the 2016 Winter Youth Olympics competitions in Lillehammer, Norway
- Highest governing body: International Ski and Snowboard Federation (FIS)
- Nicknames: Skier Cross, Skier-X
- First played: 1970; 56 years ago

Characteristics
- Contact: Incidental contact is allowed
- Team members: Single competitors
- Mixed-sex: Yes
- Type: Freestyle skiing

Presence
- Olympic: Yes, since 2010

Ski cross is a skiing competition which incorporates terrain features traditionally found in freestyle skiing with courses which include big-air jumps and high-banked turns. In spite of the fact that it is a timed racing event, it is often considered a type of freestyle skiing. What sets ski cross apart from other alpine skiing disciplines is that it involves more than one skier racing down the course. Any intentional contact with other competitors like grabbing or any other forms of contact meant to give the competitor an advantage leads to disqualification.

Ski cross is a part of the FIS Freestyle World Ski Championships, the world championship organized by the FIS for freestyle skiing. First organized in 1986, the world championship is now held every odd year. In 2010 the sport debuted as a part of the Winter Olympic Games and has been contested ever since. It was a part of the Winter X Games until 2012.

== Overview ==
In a time trial or qualification round, every competitor skis down the course, which is built to encompass both naturally occurring terrain and artificial features like jumps, rollers or banks. After the time trial, the fastest 32 skiers (fastest 16 if not 32 competitors) compete in a knockout series in rounds of four. A group of four skiers start simultaneously and attempt to reach the end of the course. The first two to cross the finish line will advance to the next round. At the end, the big final and small final rounds determine 1st to 4th and 5th to 8th places, respectively.

== History ==
The idea for a multi-racer single run with obstacles seems to have been borne at Alyeska Ski Resort in Alaska (USA) during the late 1970s. A group of racers, led by Scott Hunter an employee at Alyeska wanted to take advantage of the mountain's natural bobsled-like gullies and rollers in a race that was a hybrid between an alpine ski race and motocross. Interest waned in the early 1980s due to athletes graduating high school and leaving for college, while other racers concentrated on USSA and FIS sanctioned events. The last ski cross event on the original "silvertip" track occurred in the early 1980s.

A similar idea originated with Jim "Too Tall" Essick, one of the founders of Recreational Sports Marketing (RSM), in the late 1980s. Essick wanted to bring the excitement of motocross to skiing, in order to make ski races more exciting for spectators. The idea was pitched to several corporations, but none wanted to sponsor the concept at the time. In 1991, a television programme filmed a snowboard cross segment, and the name "boarder cross" was trademarked. Eventually, similar events were staged with skis and, thus, skier cross was born.

These days, the competition starts with a timed qualification run in order to narrow down the competition to 32 skiers. Then, skiers are divided into heats of 4 and race to the bottom of the course to secure their spot in the top half of their heat and move on to subsequent rounds of the competition until a champion is crowned. In this sport, racers are not allowed to intentionally make physical contact with each other, and such actions are grounds for immediate disqualification from the competition. However, due to the nature of the event, collisions as a result of skiers showing off, drafting, blocking or passing their opponents are not uncommon and often yield falls and injuries among multiple athletes.

=== Alternative proposals ===
Romanian alpine ski coach Ion Berindei independently developed an early concept similar to ski cross. According to Romanian Ski Federation records, Berindei invented an “obstacle race” format within freestyle skiing and formally submitted the proposal to the FIS during his tenure as national alpine coach (1958–1975). Although the concept was not adopted by FIS at the time and did not influence the later standardization of ski cross, the document represents an early documented proposal of multi-obstacle head-to-head ski racing within Europe.

== Competition ==
=== FIS Freestyle World Ski Championships ===
In addition to moguls and aerials, ski cross competitions were added to the International Ski Federation (FIS)'s FIS Freestyle Skiing World Cup calendar in 2004.

Since then, Ski Cross has been a discipline each year in the FIS Freestyle Ski Cross World Cup. The World Cup is a circuit of races held in different countries around the world, where the athletes travel to different ski locations to compete. The athletes accumulate points that count toward the Olympic Quota Allocation List. Based on the points accumulated by the athletes, they can then qualify for the upcoming Olympic games.

The 2024/2025 season consists of 10 races in France, Switzerland, Italy, Austria, Georgia, Canada, and Sweden.

=== Winter Olympic Games ===
Ski cross debuted in the Olympics at the 2010 Winter Olympics where Michael Schmid won the men's event, and Ashleigh McIvor of Canada won the women's event.

In the 2014 Winter Olympics France's Men swept the podium while in the women's event, Canadians Marielle Thompson and Kelsey Serwa finished first and second respectively. Swedish athlete Anna Holmlund took bronze.

In the 2018 Winter Olympics in Korea, Canada continued its domination of the sport. Kelsey Serwa won her second Olympic medal, this time a gold. Canadian teammate Brittany Phelan took home the silver. Swiss skier Fanny Smith won bronze. On the men's side, Brady Leman got redemption after crashing in the final at Sochi by winning gold in Korea. Swiss athlete Marc Bischofberger won silver and Russian Sergey Ridzik won bronze (competing under the Olympic Flag).

The Ski Cross competition at the 2022 Winter Olympics in Beijing, China, took place at the Genting Snow Park from February 17 to 19, 2022. The event featured exciting and unpredictable races, with several standout performances.

In the men's event, Ryan Regez of Switzerland claimed the gold medal, edging out teammate Alex Fiva of Switzerland, who took the silver. Sergey Ridzik, representing ROC, earned the bronze. The final ended with Regez's victory marking a significant achievement in his career.

On the women's side, Sandra Näslund of Sweden triumphed with a gold medal finish. Marielle Thompson of Canada secured the silver, and Daniela Maier, continuing her strong form, won the bronze. The women's event featured a long list of competitors, with the top three athletes outperforming the rest of the field on the technical course.

=== Winter X Games ===
The X Games are a series of extreme sports events founded by ESPN. Ski Cross, referred to as Skier X within the franchise, was one of the three events featured at the Winter X Games since its debut in 1998. In the 2013 Winter X Games, the sport was removed from the competition, along with snowboard cross and monoski cross, due to the high costs associated with building the cross course.

In 2016, the sport made a return to the Aspen Winter X Games, where Canadians Kelsey Serwa and Brady Leman won gold in their respective Skier X (ski cross) events. However, Skier X did not return to the competition in 2017 and has not been aired since.

== See also ==
- List of Olympic medalists in freestyle skiing
- List of Olympic venues in freestyle skiing
- Snowboard cross
- Ice cross downhill
- Kayak cross
- Four-cross
- Skate cross
