= FIS Freestyle Ski and Snowboarding World Championships 2019 – Women's ski cross =

Women's ski cross at the FIS Freestyle Ski and Snowboarding World Championships 2019
- Venue: Solitude Mountain Resort
- Location: Utah, United States
- Dates: February 1–2
- Competitors: 27 from 13 nations

Medalists
gold medal	Marielle Thompson	Canada
silver medal	Fanny Smith	Switzerland
bronze medal	Alizée Baron	France

The Women's ski cross competition at the FIS Freestyle Ski and Snowboarding World Championships 2019 was held on February 1 and 2, 2019.

== Qualification ==
The qualification was held on February 1 at 15:35.

Rank	Bib	Name	Country	Time	Notes
1	12	Marielle Thompson	Canada	1:01.58	
2	6	Fanny Smith	Switzerland	1:01.72	
3	3	Andrea Limbacher	Austria	1:01.81	
4	16	Brittany Phelan	Canada	1:01.84	
5	14	Sanna Lüdi	Switzerland	1:02.01	
6	7	Alizée Baron	France	1:02.05	
7	1	Sandra Näslund	Sweden	1:02.61	
8	10	Mikayla Martin	Canada	1:02.70	
9	8	Lisa Andersson	Sweden	1:02.76	
10	15	Kelsey Serwa	Canada	1:02.77	
11	11	Daniela Maier	Germany	1:02.89	
12	2	Marielle Berger Sabbatel	France	1:02.97	
13	5	Heidi Zacher	Germany	1:03.01	
14	4	Sami Kennedy-Sim	Australia	1:03.08	
15	13	Sixtine Cousin	Switzerland	1:03.48	
16	20	Priscillia Annen	Switzerland	1:03.58	
17	9	Katrin Ofner	Austria	1:03.66	
18	17	Anastasia Chirtsova	Russia	1:03.77	
19	19	Nikol Kučerová	Czech Republic	1:04.14	
20	21	Victoria Zavadovskaya	Russia	1:04.17	
21	18	Lucrezia Fantelli	Italy	1:04.19	
22	23	Whitney Gardner	United States	1:04.63	
23	24	Emily Sarsfield	Great Britain	1:04.94	
24	22	Tania Prymak	United States	1:06.07	
25	26	Leta McNatt	United States	1:07.43	
26	25	Emma Peters	Great Britain	1:07.52	
27	27	Karolina Riemen	Poland	1:07.93	

== Elimination round ==
All racers advanced to the 1/8 finals. From here, they participated in three-person or four-person elimination races, with the top two from each race advancing.

=== 1/8 finals ===
Heat 1

Rank	Bib	Name	Country	Notes
1	1	Marielle Thompson	Canada	Q
2	17	Katrin Ofner	Austria	Q
3	16	Priscillia Annen	Switzerland	

Heat 3

Rank	Bib	Name	Country	Notes
1	5	Sanna Lüdi	Switzerland	Q
2	12	Marielle Berger Sabbatel	France	Q
3	21	Lucrezia Fantelli	Italy	

Heat 5

Rank	Bib	Name	Country	Notes
1	3	Andrea Limbacher	Austria	Q
2	19	Nikol Kučerová	Czech Republic	Q
3	14	Sami Kennedy-Sim	Australia	

Heat 7

Rank	Bib	Name	Country	Notes
1	7	Sandra Näslund	Sweden	Q
2	10	Kelsey Serwa	Canada	Q
3	23	Emily Sarsfield	Great Britain	
4	26	Emma Peters	Great Britain	

Heat 2

Rank	Bib	Name	Country	Notes
1	9	Lisa Andersson	Sweden	Q
2	8	Mikayla Martin	Canada	Q
3	24	Tania Prymak	United States	
4	25	Leta McNatt	United States	

Heat 4

Rank	Bib	Name	Country	Notes
1	4	Brittany Phelan	Canada	Q
2	20	Victoria Zavadovskaya	Russia	Q
3	13	Heidi Zacher	Germany	

Heat 6

Rank	Bib	Name	Country	Notes
1	6	Alizée Baron	France	Q
2	11	Daniela Maier	Germany	Q
3	22	Whitney Gardner	United States	
4	27	Karolina Riemen	Poland	

Heat 8

Rank	Bib	Name	Country	Notes
1	2	Fanny Smith	Switzerland	Q
2	18	Anastasia Chirtsova	Russia	Q
3	15	Sixtine Cousin	Switzerland	

=== Quarterfinals ===
Heat 1

Rank	Bib	Name	Country	Notes
1	1	Marielle Thompson	Canada	Q
2	8	Mikayla Martin	Canada	Q
3	9	Lisa Andersson	Sweden	
4	17	Katrin Ofner	Austria	

Heat 3

Rank	Bib	Name	Country	Notes
1	6	Alizée Baron	France	Q
2	19	Nikol Kučerová	Czech Republic	Q
3	11	Daniela Maier	Germany	
4	3	Andrea Limbacher	Austria	

Heat 2

Rank	Bib	Name	Country	Notes
1	5	Sanna Lüdi	Switzerland	Q
2	4	Brittany Phelan	Canada	Q
3	12	Marielle Berger Sabbatel	France	
4	20	Victoria Zavadovskaya	Russia	

Heat 4

Rank	Bib	Name	Country	Notes
1	10	Kelsey Serwa	Canada	Q
2	2	Fanny Smith	Switzerland	Q
3	7	Sandra Näslund	Sweden	
4	18	Anastasia Chirtsova	Russia	

=== Semifinals ===
Heat 1

Rank	Bib	Name	Country	Notes
1	1	Marielle Thompson	Canada	Q
2	5	Sanna Lüdi	Switzerland	Q
3	4	Brittany Phelan	Canada	
—	8	Mikayla Martin	Canada	DNF

Heat 2

Rank	Bib	Name	Country	Notes
1	6	Alizée Baron	France	Q
2	2	Fanny Smith	Switzerland	Q
3	10	Kelsey Serwa	Canada	
—	19	Nikol Kučerová	Czech Republic	DNF

=== Finals ===
==== Small final ====
Rank	Bib	Name	Country	Notes
5	10	Kelsey Serwa	Canada	
6	4	Brittany Phelan	Canada	
7	19	Nikol Kučerová	Czech Republic	
8	8	Mikayla Martin	Canada	DNS

==== Big final ====
Rank	Bib	Name	Country	Notes
1st place, gold medalist(s)	1	Marielle Thompson	Canada	
2nd place, silver medalist(s)	2	Fanny Smith	Switzerland	
3rd place, bronze medalist(s)	6	Alizée Baron	France	
4	5	Sanna Lüdi	Switzerland	
