= Freestyle skiing at the 2022 Winter Olympics – Women's ski cross =

Women's ski cross at the XXIV Olympic Winter Games
- Freestyle skiing
- Venue: Genting Snow Park, Zhangjiakou
- Date: 17 February 2022
- Competitors: 25 from 11 nations

Medalists
1st place, gold medalist(s)		Sandra Näslund	Sweden
2nd place, silver medalist(s)		Marielle Thompson	Canada
3rd place, bronze medalist(s)		Daniela Maier	Germany
3rd place, bronze medalist(s)		Fanny Smith	Switzerland

The women's ski cross competition in freestyle skiing at the 2022 Winter Olympics was held on 17 February, at the Genting Snow Park in Zhangjiakou. Sandra Näslund of Sweden won the event, which was her first Olympic medal. Marielle Thompson of Canada, the 2014 champion, won the silver medal. The bronze medal was split between Fanny Smith of Switzerland and Daniela Maier of Germany following a Court of Arbitration of Sport decision on 13 December 2022 in regards to an interference call in the final.

The 2018 champion, Kelsey Serwa, retired from competitions. The silver medalist Brittany Phelan and the bronze medalist Fanny Smith qualified for the Olympics. At the 2021–22 FIS Freestyle Ski World Cup, before the Olympics, Näslund won all events but one and consequently led the ranking, followed by Smith. Näslund was also the 2021 world champion, while Smith was the silver medalist.

== Bronze medal controversy ==
Fanny Smith of Switzerland, the 2018 bronze medalist, initially crossed the line in third place and thought she had won the bronze medal. Daniela Maier of Germany finished fourth. However, following a 10-minute review by race judges, Smith was penalised for a clash with Maier, so at the awards ceremony on 17 February 2022, Maier was awarded the bronze.

On 26 February 2022, after the end of the Olympic Games, following an appeal from Fanny Smith, the FIS Appeals Commission made the decision to overturn the FIS Jury decision. As a result of winning the appeal, Smith was promoted to third place, while Maier officially finished in fourth place, which was reflected on the FIS website.

FIS has no right to make a decision on the return and redistribution of medals, as this issue is in the exclusive competence of the IOC; therefore, in its decision, the FIS Appeals Commission did not mention any words about the medals and their redistribution, and the IOC has the last word on this issue. On 13 December 2022, the Court of Arbitration for Sport decided both competitors will be awarded duplicate bronze medals and share third place.

== Qualification ==
A total of 30 ski cross athletes qualified to compete at the games. For an athlete to compete they must have a minimum of 80.00 FIS points on the FIS Points List on January 17, 2022 and a top 30 finish in a World Cup event or at the FIS Freestyle Ski World Championships 2021. A country could enter a maximum of four athletes into the event.

== Results ==
=== Seeding run ===
Rank	Bib	Name	Country	Time	Difference
1	5	Sandra Näslund	Sweden	1:15.21	—
2	6	Fanny Smith	Switzerland	1:17.06	+1.85
3	8	Daniela Maier	Germany	1:17.63	+2.42
4	10	Hannah Schmidt	Canada	1:18.07	+2.86
5	1	Marielle Thompson	Canada	1:18.16	+2.95
6	18	Lucrezia Fantelli	Italy	1:18.17	+2.96
7	7	Brittany Phelan	Canada	1:18.17	+2.96
8	11	Courtney Hoffos	Canada	1:18.28	+3.07
9	13	Talina Gantenbein	Switzerland	1:18.31	+3.10
10	4	Alexandra Edebo	Sweden	1:18.49	+3.28
11	14	Sami Kennedy-Sim	Australia	1:19.14	+3.93
12	12	Jole Galli	Italy	1:19.20	+3.99
13	22	Saskja Lack	Switzerland	1:19.21	+4.00
14	16	Ekaterina Maltseva	ROC	1:19.45	+4.24
15	21	Natalia Sherina	ROC	1:19.49	+4.28
16	3	Jade Grillet-Aubert	France	1:19.54	+4.33
17	20	Elizaveta Ponkratova	ROC	1:19.56	+4.35
18	15	Andrea Limbacher	Austria	1:19.69	+4.48
19	9	Katrin Ofner	Austria	1:19.95	+4.74
20	24	Johanna Holzmann	Germany	1:20.95	+5.74
21	23	Christina Födermayr	Austria	1:21.02	+5.81
22	19	Anastasia Chirtsova	ROC	1:21.53	+6.32
23	17	Nikol Kučerová	Czech Republic	1:21.96	+6.75
24	25	Ran Hongyan	China	1:25.85	+10.64
25	26	Pu Rui	China	1:30.01	+14.80
26	2	Alizée Baron	France	DNS	

=== Elimination round ===
==== 1/8 finals ====
Heat 1

Rank	Bib	Name	Country	Notes
1	1	Sandra Näslund	Sweden	Q
2	16	Jade Grillet-Aubert	France	Q
3	17	Elizaveta Ponkratova	ROC	

Heat 2

Rank	Bib	Name	Country	Notes
1	8	Courtney Hoffos	Canada	Q
2	9	Talina Gantenbein	Switzerland	Q
3	24	Ran Hongyan	China	
4	25	Pu Rui	China	

Heat 3

Rank	Bib	Name	Country	Notes
1	5	Marielle Thompson	Canada	Q
2	12	Jole Galli	Italy	Q
3	21	Christina Födermayr	Austria	

Heat 4

Rank	Bib	Name	Country	Notes
1	4	Hannah Schmidt	Canada	Q
2	20	Johanna Holzmann	Germany	Q
3	13	Saskja Lack	Switzerland	

Heat 5

Rank	Bib	Name	Country	Notes
1	3	Daniela Maier	Germany	Q
2	19	Katrin Ofner	Austria	Q
3	14	Ekaterina Maltseva	ROC	

Heat 6

Rank	Bib	Name	Country	Notes
1	11	Sami Kennedy-Sim	Australia	Q
2	22	Anastasia Chirtsova	ROC	Q
DNF	6	Lucrezia Fantelli	Italy	

Heat 7

Rank	Bib	Name	Country	Notes
1	7	Brittany Phelan	Canada	Q
2	10	Alexandra Edebo	Sweden	Q
3	23	Nikol Kučerová	Czech Republic	
DNS	26	Alizée Baron	France	

Heat 8

Rank	Bib	Name	Country	Notes
1	2	Fanny Smith	Switzerland	Q
2	18	Andrea Limbacher	Austria	Q
3	15	Natalia Sherina	ROC	

==== Quarterfinals ====
Heat 1

Rank	Bib	Name	Country	Notes
1	1	Sandra Näslund	Sweden	Q
2	8	Courtney Hoffos	Canada	Q
3	9	Talina Gantenbein	Switzerland	
4	16	Jade Grillet-Aubert	France	

Heat 2

Rank	Bib	Name	Country	Notes
1	5	Marielle Thompson	Canada	Q
2	4	Hannah Schmidt	Canada	Q
3	12	Jole Galli	Italy	
4	20	Johanna Holzmann	Germany	

Heat 3

Rank	Bib	Name	Country	Notes
1	11	Sami Kennedy-Sim	Australia	Q
2	3	Daniela Maier	Germany	Q
3	19	Katrin Ofner	Austria	
4	22	Anastasia Chirtsova	ROC	

Heat 4

Rank	Bib	Name	Country	Notes
1	2	Fanny Smith	Switzerland	Q
2	7	Brittany Phelan	Canada	Q
3	18	Andrea Limbacher	Austria	
4	10	Alexandra Edebo	Sweden	

==== Semifinals ====
Heat 1

Rank	Bib	Name	Country	Notes
1	1	Sandra Näslund	Sweden	BF
2	5	Marielle Thompson	Canada	BF
3	4	Hannah Schmidt	Canada	SF
4	8	Courtney Hoffos	Canada	SF

Heat 2

Rank	Bib	Name	Country	Notes
1	3	Daniela Maier	Germany	BF
2	2	Fanny Smith	Switzerland	BF
3	7	Brittany Phelan	Canada	SF
4	11	Sami Kennedy-Sim	Australia	SF

==== Finals ====
Small final

Rank	Bib	Name	Country	Notes
5	7	Brittany Phelan	Canada	
6	8	Courtney Hoffos	Canada	
7	4	Hannah Schmidt	Canada	
8	11	Sami Kennedy-Sim	Australia	

Big final

Rank	Bib	Name	Country	Notes
1st place, gold medalist(s)	1	Sandra Näslund	Sweden	
2nd place, silver medalist(s)	5	Marielle Thompson	Canada	
3rd place, bronze medalist(s)	2	Daniela Maier	Germany	
3rd place, bronze medalist(s)	3	Fanny Smith	Switzerland	
