= FIS Freestyle Ski and Snowboarding World Championships 2021 – Women's ski cross =

Women's ski cross at the FIS Freestyle Ski and Snowboarding World Championships 2021
- Location: Idre, Sweden
- Dates: 10 February (qualification); 13 February
- Competitors: 19 from 7 nations

Medalists
gold medal	Sandra Näslund	Sweden
silver medal	Fanny Smith	Switzerland
bronze medal	Alizée Baron	France

The Women's ski cross competition at the FIS Freestyle Ski and Snowboarding World Championships 2021 was held on 13 February 2021. A qualification was held 10 February.

== Qualification ==
The qualification was held on 10 February at 13:15.

Rank	Bib	Name	Country	Time	Notes
1	2	Fanny Smith	Switzerland	1:17.27	Q
2	3	Sandra Näslund	Sweden	1:17.90	Q
3	1	Katrin Ofner	Austria	1:19.49	Q
4	7	Alizée Baron	France	1:19.60	Q
5	19	Tiana Gairns	Canada	1:20.03	Q
6	5	Marielle Berger Sabbatel	France	1:20.38	Q
7	4	Talina Gantenbein	Switzerland	1:20.41	Q
8	9	Courtney Hoffos	Canada	1:20.42	Q
9	18	Hannah Schmidt	Canada	1:20.72	Q
10	6	Marielle Thompson	Canada	1:20.74	Q
11	12	Anastasia Chirtsova	Russian Ski Federation	1:20.77	Q
12	10	Jade Grillet-Aubert	France	1:20.84	Q
13	8	Alexandra Edebo	Sweden	1:20.92	Q
14	11	Zoe Chore	Canada	1:21.06	Q
15	17	Ekaterina Maltseva	Russian Ski Federation	1:21.48	Q
16	13	Sanna Lüdi	Switzerland	1:21.57	Q
17	16	Amélie Schneider	France	1:21.94	
18	14	Nikol Kučerová	Czech Republic	1:21.94	
19	15	Maria Dobrova	Russian Ski Federation	1:23.73	

== Elimination round ==
=== Quarterfinals ===
Heat 1

Rank	Bib	Name	Country	Notes
1	8	Courtney Hoffos	Canada	Q
2	1	Fanny Smith	Switzerland	Q
3	9	Hannah Schmidt	Canada	
4	16	Sanna Lüdi	Switzerland	

Heat 3

Rank	Bib	Name	Country	Notes
1	6	Marielle Berger Sabbatel	France	Q
2	11	Anastasia Chirtsova	Russian Ski Federation	Q
3	14	Zoe Chore	Canada	
4	3	Katrin Ofner	Austria	

Heat 2

Rank	Bib	Name	Country	Notes
1	13	Alexandra Edebo	Sweden	Q
2	4	Alizée Baron	France	Q
3	12	Jade Grillet-Aubert	France	
4	5	Tiana Gairns	Canada	

Heat 4

Rank	Bib	Name	Country	Notes
1	2	Sandra Näslund	Sweden	Q
2	7	Talina Gantenbein	Switzerland	Q
3	10	Marielle Thompson	Canada	
4	15	Ekaterina Maltseva	Russian Ski Federation	

=== Semifinals ===
Heat 1

Rank	Bib	Name	Country	Notes
1	1	Fanny Smith	Switzerland	Q
2	4	Alizée Baron	France	Q
3	8	Courtney Hoffos	Canada	
4	13	Alexandra Edebo	Sweden	

Heat 2

Rank	Bib	Name	Country	Notes
1	2	Sandra Näslund	Sweden	Q
2	7	Talina Gantenbein	Switzerland	Q
3	6	Marielle Berger Sabbatel	France	
4	11	Anastasia Chirtsova	Russian Ski Federation	

=== Finals ===
==== Small final ====
Rank	Bib	Name	Country	Notes
5	8	Courtney Hoffos	Canada	
6	6	Marielle Berger Sabbatel	France	
7	11	Anastasia Chirtsova	Russian Ski Federation	
8	13	Alexandra Edebo	Sweden	

==== Big final ====
Rank	Bib	Name	Country	Notes
1st place, gold medalist(s)	2	Sandra Näslund	Sweden	
2nd place, silver medalist(s)	1	Fanny Smith	Switzerland	
3rd place, bronze medalist(s)	4	Alizée Baron	France	
4	7	Talina Gantenbein	Switzerland	
