= Switzerland at the 2018 Winter Olympics =

- Flag of Switzerland
- IOC code: SUI
- NOC: Swiss Olympic Association
- Website: www.swissolympic.ch (in German and French)

in Pyeongchang, South Korea 9–25 February 2018
- Competitors: 166 (97 men and 71 women) in 14 sports
- Flag bearers: Dario Cologna (opening); Ramon Zenhäusern (closing)
- Medals Ranked 8th: Gold 5 Silver 6 Bronze 4 Total 15

Winter Olympics appearances (overview)
- 1924; 1928; 1932; 1936; 1948; 1952; 1956; 1960; 1964; 1968; 1972; 1976; 1980; 1984; 1988; 1992; 1994; 1998; 2002; 2006; 2010; 2014; 2018; 2022; 2026

Switzerland competed at the 2018 Winter Olympics in Pyeongchang, South Korea, from 9 to 25 February 2018, with 166 competitors in 14 sports. They won 15 medals in total (five gold, six silver and four bronze), ranking 7th in the medal table.

== Medalists ==
Medal	Name	Sport	Event	Date
Gold	Dario Cologna	Cross-country skiing	Men's 15 kilometre freestyle	16 February
Gold	Sarah Höfflin	Freestyle skiing	Women's slopestyle	17 February
Gold	Michelle Gisin	Alpine skiing	Women's combined	22 February
Gold	Wendy Holdener; Denise Feierabend; Luca Aerni; Daniel Yule; Ramon Zenhäusern	Alpine skiing	Mixed Team	24 February
Gold	Nevin Galmarini	Snowboarding	Men's parallel giant slalom	24 February
Silver	Jenny Perret; Martin Rios	Curling	Mixed doubles	13 February
Silver	Beat Feuz	Alpine skiing	Men's super G	16 February
Silver	Wendy Holdener	Alpine skiing	Women's slalom	16 February
Silver	Mathilde Gremaud	Freestyle skiing	Women's slopestyle	17 February
Silver	Marc Bischofberger	Freestyle skiing	Men's ski cross	21 February
Silver	Ramon Zenhäusern	Alpine skiing	Men's slalom	22 February
Bronze	Beat Feuz	Alpine skiing	Men's downhill	15 February
Bronze	Wendy Holdener	Alpine skiing	Women's combined	22 February
Bronze	Fanny Smith	Freestyle skiing	Women's ski cross	23 February
Bronze	Benoît Schwarz; Claudio Pätz; Peter de Cruz; Valentin Tanner; Dominik Märki	Curling	Men's	23 February

== Competitors ==
The following is the list of number of competitors participating at the Games per sport/discipline.

Sport	Men	Women	Total
Alpine skiing	13	8	21
Biathlon	5	5	10
Bobsleigh	8	2	10
Cross-country skiing	8	4	12
Curling	6	5*	11
Figure skating	0	1	1
Freestyle skiing	15	7	22
Ice hockey	25	23	48
Luge	0	1	1
Nordic combined	1	0	1
Snowboarding	12	12	24
Skeleton	0	1	1
Ski jumping	2	0	2
Speed skating	1	1	2
Total	96	70*	166

- Curler Jenny Perret will compete in both women's and mixed doubles events.

== Alpine skiing ==
According to the quota allocation system determined by the FIS, Switzerland were allocated the maximum allowance of a team of 22 athletes. Also, according to their ranking in the 2018 World Cup Nations cup rankings, Switzerland entered the new Mixed Team Event as the number 2 seeds. The Swiss Olympic Association announced their selections on 29 January 2018. The day before the opening ceremony it was announced that Mélanie Meillard would have to fly home and miss the Olympics after sustaining a knee injury in training. Both Patrick Küng and Joana Hählen were selected to the team, but did not take part in any race.

Men

Athlete	Event	Run 1		Run 2		Total	
Athlete	Event	Time	Rank	Time	Rank	Time	Rank
Luca Aerni	Combined	1:21.34	25	48.18	11	2:09.52	11
Luca Aerni	Giant slalom	1:11.40	26	1:10.22	7	2:21.62	19
Luca Aerni	Slalom	DNF					
Gino Caviezel	Giant slalom	1:09.99	13	1:11.26	24	2:21.25	15
Mauro Caviezel	Downhill	—N/a				1:41.86	13
Mauro Caviezel	Super-G	—N/a				DNF	
Mauro Caviezel	Combined	1:20.47	11	49.13	18	2:09.60	12
Beat Feuz	Downhill	—N/a				1:40.43	3rd place, bronze medalist(s)
Beat Feuz	Super-G	—N/a				1:24.57	2nd place, silver medalist(s)
Marc Gisin	Downhill	—N/a				1:42.82	21
Carlo Janka	Combined	1:20.58	14	49.22	20	2:09.80	15
Loïc Meillard	Giant slalom	1:09.77	12	1:10.68	17	2:20.45	9
Loïc Meillard	Slalom	49.63	19	50.69	3	1:40.32	14
Justin Murisier	Combined	1:21.58	30	DNF			
Justin Murisier	Giant slalom	DNF					
Gilles Roulin	Downhill	—N/a				1:43.88	33
Gilles Roulin	Super-G	—N/a				1:26.20	21
Thomas Tumler	Super-G	—N/a				1:26.52	26
Daniel Yule	Slalom	48.88	11	51.24	13	1:40.12	8
Ramon Zenhäusern	Slalom	48.66	9	50.67	2	1:39.33	2nd place, silver medalist(s)

Women

Athlete	Event	Run 1		Run 2		Total	
Athlete	Event	Time	Rank	Time	Rank	Time	Rank
Denise Feierabend	Combined	1:43.04	17	40.90	5	2:23.94	9
Denise Feierabend	Slalom	51.93	24	49.80	6	1:41.73	14
Jasmine Flury	Downhill	—N/a				DNF	
Jasmine Flury	Super-G	—N/a				1:23.30	27
Michelle Gisin	Downhill	—N/a				1:40.55	8
Michelle Gisin	Super-G	—N/a				1:21.57	9
Michelle Gisin	Combined	1:40.14	3	40.76	4	2:20.90	1st place, gold medalist(s)
Michelle Gisin	Slalom	51.43	18	50.42	12	1:41.85	16
Lara Gut	Downhill	—N/a				DNF	
Lara Gut	Super-G	—N/a				1:21.23	4
Lara Gut	Giant slalom	DNF					
Wendy Holdener	Combined	1:42.11	10	40.23	1	2:22.34	3rd place, bronze medalist(s)
Wendy Holdener	Giant slalom	1:11.92	13	1:09.35	6	2:29.27	9
Wendy Holdener	Slalom	48.89	1	49.79	5	1:38.68	2nd place, silver medalist(s)
Corinne Suter	Downhill	—N/a				1:40.29	6
Corinne Suter	Super-G	—N/a				1:22.24	17
Simone Wild	Giant slalom	1:13.52	22	1:13.23	33	2:26.75	28

Mixed

Athlete	Event	Round of 16	Quarterfinals	Semifinals	Final / BM	
Athlete	Event	Opposition Result	Opposition Result	Opposition Result	Opposition Result	Rank
Wendy Holdener; Denise Feierabend; Luca Aerni; Daniel Yule; Ramon Zenhäusern	Team	Hungary; W 4–0	Germany; W 2*–2	France; W 3–1	Austria; W 3–1	1st place, gold medalist(s)

== Biathlon ==
Based on their Nations Cup rankings in the 2016–17 Biathlon World Cup, Switzerland has qualified a team of 5 men and 5 women. The Swiss Olympic Association announced the team for the Biathlon on 23 January 2018.

Men

Athlete	Event	Time	Misses	Rank
Mario Dolder	Sprint	25:54.8	5 (3+2)	64
Mario Dolder	Individual	52:46.5	3 (0+1+0+2)	49
Jeremy Finello	Sprint	25:54.7	3 (2+1)	63
Jeremy Finello	Individual	52:37.5	3 (0+1+0+2)	47
Benjamin Weger	Sprint	24:15.5	1 (0+1)	15
Benjamin Weger	Pursuit	33:54.8	2 (1+0+0+1)	6
Benjamin Weger	Individual	48:52.4	1 (1+0+0+0)	6
Benjamin Weger	Mass start	38:10.5	5 (2+2+1+0)	27
Serafin Wiestner	Sprint	24:02.3	1 (0+1)	9
Serafin Wiestner	Pursuit	36:37.0	6 (0+1+3+2)	28
Serafin Wiestner	Mass start	38:00.9	3 (2+1+0+0)	24
Mario Dolder; Jeremy Finello; Benjamin Weger; Serafin Wiestner	Team relay	1:23:06.1	24 (10+14)	15

Women

Athlete	Event	Time	Misses	Rank
Irene Cadurisch	Sprint	21:51.7	1 (1+0)	8
Irene Cadurisch	Pursuit	32:52.8	4 (0+0+3+1)	16
Irene Cadurisch	Mass start	39:44.7	4 (2+1+1+0)	28
Aita Gasparin	Individual	48:26.2	5 (1+2+1+1)	68
Elisa Gasparin	Sprint	22:52.4	2 (0+2)	31
Elisa Gasparin	Pursuit	34:11.2	5 (2+2+1+0)	35
Elisa Gasparin	Individual	43:22.4	1 (1+0+0+0)	8
Elisa Gasparin	Mass start	39:21.0	5 (0+2+1+2)	27
Selina Gasparin	Sprint	23:18.4	4 (3+1)	41
Selina Gasparin	Pursuit	34:40.2	5 (2+2+1+0)	39
Selina Gasparin	Individual	48:07.4	5 (1+0+2+2)	65
Lena Häcki	Sprint	22:39.7	3 (1+2)	26
Lena Häcki	Pursuit	32:16.8	3 (1+1+1+0)	8
Lena Häcki	Individual	45:22.5	4 (1+2+1+0)	34
Lena Häcki	Mass start	38:22.3	4 (1+2+0+1)	23
Irene Cadurisch; Elisa Gasparin; Selina Gasparin; Lena Häcki	Team relay	1:12:46.9	16 (8+8)	6

Mixed

Athlete	Event	Time	Misses	Rank
Elisa Gasparin; Lena Häcki; Benjamin Weger; Serafin Wiestner	Team relay	1:11:31.4	1 (1+13)	13

== Bobsleigh ==
Based on their rankings in the 2017–18 Bobsleigh World Cup, Switzerland has qualified 5 sleds.

Athlete	Event	Run 1		Run 2		Run 3		Run 4		Total	
Athlete	Event	Time	Rank	Time	Rank	Time	Rank	Time	Rank	Time	Rank
Clemens Bracher*; Michael Kuonen	Two-man	49.73	17	49.90	10	49.64	16	49.56	10	3:18.83	16
Rico Peter*; Simon Friedli	Two-man	49.72	16	49.53	5	49.52	10	49.49	9	3:18.26	11
Clemens Bracher*; Alain Knuser; Martin Meier; Fabio Badraun	Four-man	49.06	9	49.54	=15	49.59	16	49.72	14	3:17.91	14
Rico Peter*; Thomas Amrhein; Simon Friedli; Michael Kuonen	Four-man	49.05	8	49.16	=2	48.87	2	49.51	1	3:16.59	4
Sabina Hafner*; Rahel Rebsamen	Two-woman	50.86	8	51.16	10	51.07	9	51.21	9	3:24.30	9

- Alex Baumann and Eveline Rebsamen (replacement athletes)

* – Denotes the driver of each sled

== Cross-country skiing ==
In line with the quota allocation system published by the FIS, the Swiss Olympic Association announced its selection of a team of 13 athletes in total on 26 January 2018. On 29 January, the Olympic Association announced that for health reasons, Jason Rüesch would be unable to compete in the games, and there would be no replacement named to the team.

Distance
Men

Athlete	Event	Classical		Freestyle		Total		
Athlete	Event	Time	Rank	Time	Rank	Time	Deficit	Rank
Jonas Baumann	30 km skiathlon	42:25.7	38	37:20.1	35	1:20:13.4	+3:53.4	39
Dario Cologna	15 km freestyle	—N/a				33:43.9	+0.0	1st place, gold medalist(s)
Dario Cologna	30 km skiathlon	40:30.9	3	35:41.9	12	1:16:45.1	+25.1	6
Dario Cologna	50 km classical	—N/a				2:12:43.2	+4:21.1	9
Roman Furger	15 km freestyle	—N/a				34:56.3	+1:12.4	12
Toni Livers	15 km freestyle	—N/a				36:14.5	+2:30.6	34
Toni Livers	30 km skiathlon	42:36.1	42	37:00.08	33	1:20:13.4	+3:53.4	40
Candide Pralong	15 km freestyle	—N/a				36:47.7	+3:03.8	50
Candide Pralong	30 km skiathlon	42:26.0	39	36:26.2	21	1:19:15.6	+2:55.6	31
Candide Pralong	50 km classical	—N/a				2:18:41.5	+10:19.4	31
Ueli Schnider	50 km classical	—N/a				2:23:17.3	+14:55.2	45
Jonas Baumann; Dario Cologna; Roman Furger; Toni Livers	4 × 10 km relay	—N/a				1:38:01.4	+4:56.5	11

Women

Athlete	Event	Classical		Freestyle		Total		
Athlete	Event	Time	Rank	Time	Rank	Time	Deficit	Rank
Nadine Fähndrich	15 km skiathlon	22:35.8	23	21:14.6	45	43:50.4	+3:05.5	27
Lydia Hiernickel	10 km freestyle	—N/a				28:33.4	+3:32.9	49
Nathalie von Siebenthal	10 km freestyle	—N/a				25:50.3	+49.8	6
Nathalie von Siebenthal	15 km skiathlon	21:57.4	10	19:05.1	6	41:02.5	+17.6	6
Nathalie von Siebenthal	30 km classical	—N/a				1:31:27.9	+9:10.3	22
Nadine Fähndrich; Lydia Hiernickel; Laurien van der Graaff; Nathalie von Siebenthal	4 × 5 km relay	—N/a				53:15.8	+1:51.5	7

Sprint

Athlete	Event	Qualification		Quarterfinal		Semifinal		Final	
Athlete	Event	Time	Rank	Time	Rank	Time	Rank	Time	Rank
Jovian Hediger	Men's sprint	3:15.86	17 Q	3:14.25	4	Did not advance			
Erwan Käser	Men's sprint	3:22.48	50	Did not advance					
Ueli Schnider	Men's sprint	3:19.47	39	Did not advance					
Dario Cologna; Roman Furger	Men's team sprint	—N/a				16:10.52	6	Did not advance	
Nadine Fähndrich	Women's sprint	3:19.42	20 Q	3:14.82	4	Did not advance			
Laurien van der Graaff	Women's sprint	3:19.62	21 Q	3:12.10	2 Q	3:15.65	5	Did not advance	
Nadine Fähndrich; Laurien van der Graaff	Women's team sprint	—N/a				16:39.83	2 Q	16:17.79	4

== Curling ==
Switzerland will compete in all three events, including the debuting mixed doubles event.

Summary

Team	Event	Group stage										Tiebreaker	Semifinal	Final / BM	
Team	Event	Opposition Score	Opposition Score	Opposition Score	Opposition Score	Opposition Score	Opposition Score	Opposition Score	Opposition Score	Opposition Score	Rank	Opposition Score	Opposition Score	Opposition Score	Rank
Benoît Schwarz; Claudio Pätz; Peter de Cruz; Valentin Tanner; Dominik Märki	Men's tournament	(United Kingdom) GBR; L 5–6	(Italy) ITA; L 4–7	(Denmark) DEN; W 9–7	(Japan) JPN; W 6–5	(Norway) NOR; W 7–5	(Canada) CAN; W 8–6	(Sweden) SWE; W 10–3	(South Korea) KOR; L 7–8	(United States) USA; L 4–8	4 TB	GBR; W 9–5	(Sweden) SWE; L 3–9	CAN; W 7–5	3rd place, bronze medalist(s)
Silvana Tirinzoni; Manuela Siegrist; Esther Neuenschwander; Marlene Albrecht; Jenny Perret	Women's tournament	(China) CHN; L 2–7	(United States) USA; W 6–5	(South Korea) KOR; L 5–7	(Sweden) SWE; L 7–8	(Canada) CAN; L 8–10	(International Olympic Committee) OAR; W 11–2	(United Kingdom) GBR; L 7–8	(Denmark) DEN; W 6–4	(Japan) JPN; W 8–4	7	Did not advance			
Jenny Perret; Martin Rios	Mixed doubles	(China) CHN; W 7–5	(Finland) FIN; W 7–6	(United States) USA; W 9–4	(Norway) NOR; L 5–6	(Canada) CAN; L 2–7	(South Korea) KOR; W 6–4	(International Olympic Committee) OAR; W 9–8	—N/a		2 Q	BYE	(International Olympic Committee) OAR; W 7–5	(Canada) CAN; L 3–10	2nd place, silver medalist(s)

=== Men's tournament ===
Switzerland has qualified a men's team by earning enough points in the last two World Curling Championships.

Final round robin standings
Team	Skip	Pld	W	L	PF	PA	EW	EL	BE	SE	S%	Qualification
Sweden	Niklas Edin	9	7	2	62	43	34	28	13	8	87%	Playoffs
Canada	Kevin Koe	9	6	3	56	46	36	34	14	8	87%	Playoffs
United States	John Shuster	9	5	4	67	63	37	39	4	6	80%	Playoffs
Great Britain	Kyle Smith	9	5	4	55	60	40	37	8	7	82%	Tiebreaker
Switzerland	Peter de Cruz	9	5	4	60	55	39	37	10	6	83%	Tiebreaker
Norway	Thomas Ulsrud	9	4	5	52	56	34	39	7	8	82%	
South Korea	Kim Chang-min	9	4	5	65	63	39	39	8	8	82%	
Japan	Yusuke Morozumi	9	4	5	48	56	33	35	13	5	81%	
Italy	Joël Retornaz	9	3	6	50	56	37	38	15	7	81%	
Denmark	Rasmus Stjerne	9	2	7	53	70	36	39	12	5	83%	

Round-robin

Switzerland has a bye in draws 4, 8 and 12.

Draw 1

Wednesday, 14 February, 09:05

Sheet D	1	2	3	4	5	6	7	8	9	10	11	Final
Switzerland (de Cruz)	0	0	0	1	0	2	0	1	0	1	0	5
Great Britain (Smith)	0	0	1	0	1	0	1	0	2	0	1	6

Draw 2

Wednesday, 14 February, 20:05

Sheet C	1	2	3	4	5	6	7	8	9	10	Final
Switzerland (de Cruz)	0	0	1	0	0	0	1	0	2	0	4
Italy (Retornaz)	1	1	0	1	0	1	0	1	0	2	7

Draw 3

Thursday, 15 February, 14:05

Sheet D	1	2	3	4	5	6	7	8	9	10	Final
Denmark (Stjerne)	0	0	2	0	1	1	0	2	0	1	7
Switzerland (de Cruz)	1	1	0	3	0	0	2	0	2	0	9

Draw 5

Friday, 16 February, 20:05

Sheet A	1	2	3	4	5	6	7	8	9	10	Final
Japan (Morozumi)	0	2	0	1	0	0	0	2	0	0	5
Switzerland (de Cruz)	3	0	1	0	0	1	0	0	0	1	6

Draw 6

Saturday, 17 February, 14:05

Sheet B	1	2	3	4	5	6	7	8	9	10	Final
Switzerland (de Cruz)	1	0	0	1	0	0	2	0	2	1	7
Norway (Ulsrud)	0	1	1	0	0	2	0	1	0	0	5

Draw 7

Sunday, 18 February, 09:05

Sheet D	1	2	3	4	5	6	7	8	9	10	Final
Switzerland (de Cruz)	4	0	1	0	2	0	0	0	1	X	8
Canada (Koe)	0	2	0	1	0	2	1	0	0	X	6

Draw 9

Monday, 19 February, 14:05

Sheet B	1	2	3	4	5	6	7	8	9	10	Final
Sweden (Edin)	0	0	0	2	0	1	0	X	X	X	3
Switzerland (de Cruz)	2	1	1	0	1	0	5	X	X	X	10

Draw 10

Tuesday, 20 February, 09:05

Sheet C	1	2	3	4	5	6	7	8	9	10	Final
South Korea (Kim)	0	0	4	0	0	1	0	2	0	1	8
Switzerland (de Cruz)	1	0	0	1	3	0	1	0	1	0	7

Draw 11

Wednesday, 20 February, 20:05

Sheet A	1	2	3	4	5	6	7	8	9	10	Final
Switzerland (de Cruz)	0	1	0	1	0	1	0	1	0	X	4
United States (Shuster)	0	0	1	0	3	0	3	0	1	X	8

Tiebreaker

Thursday, 22 February, 9:05

Sheet D	1	2	3	4	5	6	7	8	9	10	Final
Great Britain (Smith)	2	0	0	2	0	0	0	1	0	X	5
Switzerland (de Cruz)	0	1	0	0	2	1	0	0	5	X	9

Semifinal

Thursday, 22 February, 20:05

Sheet A	1	2	3	4	5	6	7	8	9	10	Final
Sweden (Edin)	2	0	0	4	0	2	1	0	X	X	9
Switzerland (de Cruz)	0	1	0	0	1	0	0	1	X	X	3

Bronze-medal game

Friday, 23 February, 15:35

Sheet B	1	2	3	4	5	6	7	8	9	10	Final
Canada (Koe)	0	0	0	2	0	1	0	2	0	X	5
Switzerland (de Cruz)	0	1	1	0	2	0	2	0	1	X	7

=== Women's tournament ===
Switzerland has qualified a women's team by earning enough points in the last two World Curling Championships. The women's team was determined at the 2017 Swiss Olympic Curling Trials, which was won by Team Silvana Tirinzoni, who went undefeated in the tournament.

Final round robin standings
Team	Skip	Pld	W	L	PF	PA	EW	EL	BE	SE	S%	Qualification
South Korea	Kim Eun-jung	9	8	1	75	44	41	34	5	15	79%	Playoffs
Sweden	Anna Hasselborg	9	7	2	64	48	42	34	14	13	83%	Playoffs
Great Britain	Eve Muirhead	9	6	3	61	56	39	38	12	6	79%	Playoffs
Japan	Satsuki Fujisawa	9	5	4	59	55	38	36	10	13	75%	Playoffs
China	Wang Bingyu	9	4	5	57	65	35	38	12	5	78%	
Canada	Rachel Homan	9	4	5	68	59	40	36	10	12	81%	
Switzerland	Silvana Tirinzoni	9	4	5	60	55	34	37	12	7	78%	
United States	Nina Roth	9	4	5	56	65	38	39	7	6	78%	
Olympic Athletes from Russia	Victoria Moiseeva	9	2	7	45	76	34	40	8	6	76%	
Denmark	Madeleine Dupont	9	1	8	50	72	32	41	10	6	73%	

Round-robin

Switzerland has a bye in draws 2, 6 and 10.

Draw 1

Wednesday, 14 February, 14:05

Sheet D	1	2	3	4	5	6	7	8	9	10	Final
Switzerland (Tirinzoni)	1	0	0	0	0	1	0	0	X	X	2
China (Wang)	0	2	1	1	0	0	0	3	X	X	7

Draw 3

Thursday, 15 February, 20:05

Sheet C	1	2	3	4	5	6	7	8	9	10	Final
United States (Roth)	0	0	1	0	0	2	0	1	0	1	5
Switzerland (Tirinzoni)	0	2	0	1	2	0	0	0	1	0	6

Draw 4

Friday, 16 February, 14:05

Sheet B	1	2	3	4	5	6	7	8	9	10	Final
South Korea (Kim)	1	0	1	1	1	0	1	0	2	0	7
Switzerland (Tirinzoni)	0	2	0	0	0	1	0	1	0	1	5

Draw 5

Saturday, 17 February, 09:05

Sheet A	1	2	3	4	5	6	7	8	9	10	Final
Switzerland (Tirinzoni)	0	2	2	0	0	0	0	0	1	2	7
Sweden (Hasselborg)	1	0	0	1	0	1	3	2	0	0	8

Draw 7

Sunday, 18 February, 14:05

Sheet C	1	2	3	4	5	6	7	8	9	10	Final
Canada (Homan)	0	0	2	0	2	0	2	0	3	1	10
Switzerland (Tirinzoni)	1	0	0	3	0	3	0	1	0	0	8

Draw 8

Monday, 19 February, 09:05

Sheet D	1	2	3	4	5	6	7	8	9	10	Final
Olympic Athletes from Russia (Moiseeva)	0	1	0	0	0	1	0	X	X	X	2
Switzerland (Tirinzoni)	0	0	3	2	2	0	4	X	X	X	11

Draw 9

Monday, 19 February, 20:05

Sheet A	1	2	3	4	5	6	7	8	9	10	Final
Great Britain (Muirhead)	2	0	0	1	0	2	0	1	0	2	8
Switzerland (Tirinzoni)	0	0	2	0	1	0	2	0	2	0	7

Draw 11

Wednesday, 21 February, 09:05

Sheet C	1	2	3	4	5	6	7	8	9	10	Final
Switzerland (Tirinzoni)	1	0	0	0	3	0	1	0	1	X	6
Denmark (Dupont)	0	0	0	2	0	1	0	1	0	X	4

Draw 12

Wednesday, 21 February, 20:05

Sheet B	1	2	3	4	5	6	7	8	9	10	Final
Switzerland (Tirinzoni)	0	2	0	4	0	0	0	1	1	X	8
Japan (Fujisawa)	0	0	1	0	2	0	1	0	0	X	4

=== Mixed doubles ===
Switzerland has qualified a mixed doubles team by earning enough points in the last two World Mixed Doubles Curling Championships.

Final round robin standings
Team	Athletes	Pld	W	L	PF	PA	EW	EL	BE	SE	S%	Qualification
Canada	Kaitlyn Lawes / John Morris	7	6	1	52	26	28	20	0	9	80%	Playoffs
Switzerland	Jenny Perret / Martin Rios	7	5	2	45	40	29	26	0	10	71%	Playoffs
Olympic Athletes from Russia	Anastasia Bryzgalova / Alexander Krushelnitskiy	7	4	3	36	44	26	27	1	7	67%	Playoffs
Norway	Kristin Skaslien / Magnus Nedregotten	7	4	3	39	43	26	25	1	8	74%	Tiebreaker
China	Wang Rui / Ba Dexin	7	4	3	47	42	27	27	1	6	72%	Tiebreaker
South Korea	Jang Hye-ji / Lee Ki-jeong	7	2	5	40	40	23	29	1	7	67%	
United States	Rebecca Hamilton / Matt Hamilton	7	2	5	37	43	26	25	0	9	74%	
Finland	Oona Kauste / Tomi Rantamäki	7	1	6	35	53	23	29	0	6	67%	

Draw 1

Thursday, 8 February, 9:05

Sheet D	1	2	3	4	5	6	7	8	9	Final
China (Wang / Ba)	1	0	0	2	0	1	0	1	0	5
Switzerland (Perret / Rios)	0	1	1	0	1	0	2	0	2	7

Draw 2

Thursday, 8 February, 20:04

Sheet A	1	2	3	4	5	6	7	8	Final
Finland (Kauste / Rantamäki)	0	0	2	0	0	2	2	0	6
Switzerland (Perret / Rios)	2	1	0	2	1	0	0	1	7

Draw 3

Friday, 9 February, 8:35

Sheet B	1	2	3	4	5	6	7	8	Final
United States (R. Hamilton / M. Hamilton)	1	1	0	1	0	0	1	0	4
Switzerland (Perret / Rios)	0	0	1	0	1	1	0	6	9

Draw 4

Friday, 9 February, 13:35

Sheet D	1	2	3	4	5	6	7	8	Final
Switzerland (Perret / Rios)	1	0	0	2	1	0	1	0	5
Norway (Skaslien / Nedregotten)	0	3	1	0	0	1	0	1	6

Draw 5

Saturday, 10 February, 9:05

Sheet C	1	2	3	4	5	6	7	8	Final
Canada (Lawes / Morris)	0	4	0	1	1	1	X	X	7
Switzerland (Perret / Rios)	1	0	1	0	0	0	X	X	2

Draw 6

Saturday, 10 February, 20:04

Sheet B	1	2	3	4	5	6	7	8	Final
Switzerland (Perret / Rios)	2	1	0	1	1	0	1	0	6
South Korea (Jang / Lee)	0	0	1	0	0	1	0	2	4

Draw 7

Sunday, 11 February, 9:05

Sheet C	1	2	3	4	5	6	7	8	Final
Switzerland (Perret / Rios)	0	2	0	0	2	2	0	3	9
Olympic Athletes from Russia (Bryzgalova / Krushelnitskiy)	2	0	4	1	0	0	1	0	8

Semifinal

Monday, 12 February, 20:05

Sheet C	1	2	3	4	5	6	7	8	Final
Olympic Athletes from Russia (Bryzgalova / Krushelnitskiy)	0	2	0	0	2	1	0	0	5
Switzerland (Perret / Rios)	2	0	1	1	0	0	2	1	7

Gold-medal game

Tuesday, 13 February, 20:05

Sheet B	1	2	3	4	5	6	7	8	Final
Canada (Lawes / Morris)	2	0	4	0	2	2	X	X	10
Switzerland (Perret / Rios)	0	2	0	1	0	0	X	X	3

== Figure skating ==
Switzerland qualified one female figure skater through the 2017 CS Nebelhorn Trophy. The team was announced on 22 December 2017.

Athlete	Event	SP		FS		Total	
Athlete	Event	Points	Rank	Points	Rank	Points	Rank
Alexia Paganini	Ladies' singles	55.26	19 Q	101.00	22	156.26	21

== Freestyle skiing ==
On 25 January 2018, the Swiss Olympic Association confirmed their selection of a total of 23 athletes across the Freestyle skiing disciplines. On 31 January it was announced that Marco Tadé could not compete in moguls, and that the Swiss would not substitute another athlete for him.

Aerials

Athlete	Event	Qualification				Final					
Athlete	Event	Jump 1		Jump 2		Jump 1		Jump 2		Jump 3	
Athlete	Event	Points	Rank	Points	Rank	Points	Rank	Points	Rank	Points	Rank
Mischa Gasser	Men's aerials	113.72	14	121.72	6 Q	99.12	11	Did not advance			
Nicolas Gygax	Men's aerials	88.29	20	88.92	17	Did not advance					
Dimitri Isler	Men's aerials	123.98	=7	88.94	3 Q	97.79	12	Did not advance			
Noé Roth	Men's aerials	116.06	13	116.64	10	Did not advance					

Halfpipe

Athlete	Event	Qualification				Final				
Athlete	Event	Run 1	Run 2	Best	Rank	Run 1	Run 2	Run 3	Best	Rank
Robin Briguet	Men's halfpipe	23.00	29.40	29.40	25	Did not advance				
Joel Gisler	Men's halfpipe	59.80	9.80	59.80	18	Did not advance				
Rafael Kreienbühl	Men's halfpipe	55.20	22.20	55.20	19	Did not advance				

Moguls

Athlete	Event	Qualification								Final											
Athlete	Event	Run 1				Run 2				Run 1				Run 2				Run 3			
Athlete	Event	Time	Points	Total	Rank	Time	Points	Total	Rank	Time	Points	Total	Rank	Time	Points	Total	Rank	Time	Points	Total	Rank
Deborah Scanzio	Women's moguls	30.82	53.11	66.38	21	31.29	56.28	69.02	11	did not advance											

Ski cross

Athlete	Event	Seeding		Round of 16	Quarterfinal	Semifinal	Final	
Athlete	Event	Time	Rank	Position	Position	Position	Position	Rank
Marc Bischofberger	Men's ski cross	1:09.99	9	1 Q	2 Q	2 FA	2	2nd place, silver medalist(s)
Alex Fiva	Men's ski cross	1:08.74	1	1 Q	3	Did not advance		
Jonas Lenherr	Men's ski cross	1:10.12	13	2 Q	4	Did not advance		
Armin Niederer	Men's ski cross	1:09.46	4	1 Q	1 Q	3 FB	1	5
Priscillia Annen	Women's ski cross	2:30.03	23	3	Did not advance			
Talina Gantenbein	Women's ski cross	1:15.97	16	2 Q	3	Did not advance		
Sanna Lüdi	Women's ski cross	1:15.13	10	2 Q	2 Q	3 FB	3	7
Fanny Smith	Women's ski cross	1:13.90	5	1 Q	1 Q	2 FA	3	3rd place, bronze medalist(s)

Qualification legend: FA – Qualify to medal round; FB – Qualify to consolation round

Slopestyle

Athlete	Event	Qualification				Final				
Athlete	Event	Run 1	Run 2	Best	Rank	Run 1	Run 2	Run 3	Best	Rank
Elias Ambühl	Men's slopestyle	89.60	67.40	89.60	9 Q	18.80	71.60	73.20	73.20	9
Fabian Bösch	Men's slopestyle	8.20	55.00	55.00	24	Did not advance				
Jonas Hunziker	Men's slopestyle	85.80	64.80	85.80	12 Q	5.20	66.20	46.40	66.20	10
Andri Ragettli	Men's slopestyle	95.00	27.40	95.00	2 Q	85.80	73.20	65.40	85.80	7
Mathilde Gremaud	Women's slopestyle	85.40	71.60	85.40	5 Q	88.00	29.40	29.40	88.00	2nd place, silver medalist(s)
Sarah Höfflin	Women's slopestyle	83.00	21.20	83.00	7 Q	83.80	27.80	91.20	91.20	1st place, gold medalist(s)

== Ice hockey ==
Summary

Key:

- OT – Overtime
- GWS – Match decided by penalty-shootout

Team	Event	Group stage				Qualification playoff	Quarterfinal	Semifinal / Pl.	Final / BM / Pl.	
Team	Event	Opposition Score	Opposition Score	Opposition Score	Rank	Opposition Score	Opposition Score	Opposition Score	Opposition Score	Rank
Switzerland men's	Men's tournament	Canada; L 1–5	South Korea; W 8–0	Czech Republic; L 1–4	3	Germany; L 1–2 (OT)	Did not advance			10
Switzerland women's	Women's tournament	Korea; W 8–0	Japan; W 3–1	Sweden; W 2–1	1 Q	—N/a	Olympic Athletes from Russia; L 2–6	Korea; W 2–0	Japan; W 1–0	5

=== Men's tournament ===
Switzerland men's national ice hockey team qualified by finishing as one of the top eight teams in the 2015 IIHF World Ranking.

Team roster

The following is the Swiss roster for the men's ice hockey tournament at the 2018 Winter Olympics.

Head coach: (Switzerland) Patrick Fischer Assistant coaches: (Switzerland) Christian Wohlwend, (Sweden) Tommy Albelin

No.	Pos.	Name	Height	Weight	Birthdate	Birthplace	2017–18 team
1	G	Jonas Hiller	1.87 m (6 ft 2 in)	87 kg (192 lb)	12 February 1982	Felben-Wellhausen	(Switzerland) EHC Biel (NL)
4	D	Patrick Geering	1.78 m (5 ft 10 in)	87 kg (192 lb)	12 February 1990	Zürich	(Switzerland) ZSC Lions (NL)
8	F	Vincent Praplan	1.81 m (5 ft 11 in)	84 kg (185 lb)	10 June 1994	Sierre	(Switzerland) EHC Kloten (NL)
9	F	Thomas Rüfenacht	1.80 m (5 ft 11 in)	85 kg (187 lb)	22 February 1985	Meggen	(Switzerland) SC Bern (NL)
10	F	Andres Ambühl – A	1.76 m (5 ft 9 in)	85 kg (187 lb)	14 September 1983	Davos	(Switzerland) HC Davos (NL)
13	D	Félicien Du Bois	1.87 m (6 ft 2 in)	85 kg (187 lb)	18 October 1983	Neuchâtel	(Switzerland) HC Davos (NL)
15	F	Grégory Hofmann	1.84 m (6 ft 0 in)	90 kg (200 lb)	13 November 1992	Biel	(Switzerland) HC Lugano (NL)
16	D	Raphael Diaz	1.81 m (5 ft 11 in)	88 kg (194 lb)	9 January 1986	Baar	(Switzerland) EV Zug (NL)
19	F	Reto Schäppi	1.94 m (6 ft 4 in)	98 kg (216 lb)	27 January 1991	Horgen	(Switzerland) ZSC Lions (NL)
23	F	Simon Bodenmann	1.78 m (5 ft 10 in)	83 kg (183 lb)	2 March 1988	Urnäsch	(Switzerland) SC Bern (NL)
27	D	Dominik Schlumpf	1.82 m (6 ft 0 in)	79 kg (174 lb)	3 March 1991	Mönchaltorf	(Switzerland) EV Zug (NL)
44	F	Pius Suter	1.80 m (5 ft 11 in)	80 kg (180 lb)	24 May 1996	Zürich	(Switzerland) ZSC Lions (NL)
52	G	Tobias Stephan	1.91 m (6 ft 3 in)	87 kg (192 lb)	21 January 1984	Zürich	(Switzerland) EV Zug (NL)
54	D	Philippe Furrer – C	1.86 m (6 ft 1 in)	92 kg (203 lb)	16 June 1985	Bern	(Switzerland) HC Lugano (NL)
55	D	Romain Loeffel	1.78 m (5 ft 10 in)	84 kg (185 lb)	10 March 1991	La Chaux-de-Fonds	(Switzerland) Genève-Servette HC (NL)
58	D	Eric Blum	1.78 m (5 ft 10 in)	82 kg (181 lb)	13 June 1986	Pfaffnau	(Switzerland) SC Bern (NL)
60	F	Tristan Scherwey	1.76 m (5 ft 9 in)	85 kg (187 lb)	7 May 1991	Wünnewil-Flamatt	(Switzerland) SC Bern (NL)
61	F	Fabrice Herzog	1.89 m (6 ft 2 in)	87 kg (192 lb)	9 December 1994	Frauenfeld	(Switzerland) ZSC Lions (NL)
63	G	Leonardo Genoni	1.80 m (5 ft 11 in)	80 kg (180 lb)	28 August 1987	Semione	(Switzerland) SC Bern (NL)
65	D	Ramon Untersander	1.84 m (6 ft 0 in)	86 kg (190 lb)	21 January 1991	Alt St. Johann	(Switzerland) SC Bern (NL)
70	F	Denis Hollenstein	1.83 m (6 ft 0 in)	88 kg (194 lb)	15 October 1989	Zürich	(Switzerland) EHC Kloten (NL)
71	F	Enzo Corvi	1.83 m (6 ft 0 in)	86 kg (190 lb)	23 December 1992	Chur	(Switzerland) HC Davos (NL)
82	F	Simon Moser – A	1.87 m (6 ft 2 in)	95 kg (209 lb)	10 March 1989	Bern	(Switzerland) SC Bern (NL)
89	F	Cody Almond	1.88 m (6 ft 2 in)	99 kg (218 lb)	24 July 1989	Calgary, Alberta, Canada	(Switzerland) Genève-Servette HC (NL)
92	F	Gaëtan Haas	1.82 m (6 ft 0 in)	83 kg (183 lb)	31 January 1992	Bonfol	(Switzerland) SC Bern (NL)

Forward Joël Vermin was also selected but was unable to participate due to injury. He was replaced by Grégory Hofmann.

Preliminary round

Pos	Team	Pld	W	OTW	OTL	L	GF	GA	GD	Pts	Qualification
1	Czech Republic	3	2	1	0	0	9	4	+5	8	Quarterfinals
2	Canada	3	2	0	1	0	11	4	+7	7	Quarterfinals
3	Switzerland	3	1	0	0	2	10	9	+1	3	Qualification playoffs
4	South Korea (H)	3	0	0	0	3	1	14	−13	0	Qualification playoffs

Source: IIHF
(H) Host

15 February 2018; 21:10	Switzerland	1–5 (0–2, 0–2, 1–1)	Canada	Kwandong Hockey Centre, Gangneung; Attendance: 2,802

Game reference

Leonardo Genoni
Jonas Hiller
Goalies
Ben Scrivens
Referees:
(Czech Republic) Antonín Jeřábek
(Russia) Konstantin Olenin
Linesmen:
(Sweden) Jimmy Dahmen
(Russia) Alexander Otmakhov

	0–1	02:57 – Bourque (Lee, Roy)
	0–2	07:30 – Noreau (Lee, Roy) (PP)
	0–3	25:00 – Bourque (Roy) (PP)
	0–4	25:52 – Wolski (Noreau)
Moser (Rüfenacht, Ambühl) (PP, EA) – 47:33	1–4
	1–5	54:53 – Wolski (Kelly, Ebbett) (ENG)

6 min
Penalties
6 min
29
Shots
28

17 February 2018; 16:40	South Korea	0–8 (0–1, 0–2, 0–5)	Switzerland	Gangneung Hockey Centre, Pyeongchang; Attendance: 6,568

Game reference

Matt Dalton
Park Sung-je
Goalies
Jonas Hiller
Referees:
(Czech Republic) Jan Hribik
(Finland) Aleksi Rantala
Linesmen:
(Czech Republic) Miroslav Lhotský
(United States) Fraser McIntyre

0–1	10:23 – Hollenstein (Haas, Loeffel)
0–2	27:36 – Du Bois
0–3	35:55 – Suter (Herzog)
0–4	43:50 – Rüfenacht (Untersander, Almond)
0–5	45:17 – Suter (Ambühl, Moser)
0–6	46:45 – Schäppi (Almond, Geering)
0–7	51:24 – Suter (Geering, Ambühl)
0–8	55:10 – Corvi (Hofmann, Du Bois)

8 min
Penalties
10 min
25
Shots
34

18 February 2018; 16:40	Czech Republic	4–1 (1–1, 0–0, 3–0)	Switzerland	Gangneung Hockey Centre, Pyeongchang; Attendance: 6,137

Game reference

Pavel Francouz
Goalies
Jonas Hiller
Referees:
(Canada) Brett Iverson
(Russia) Konstantin Olenin
Linesmen:
(United States) Judson Ritter
(Canada) Nathan Vanoosten

Řepík (Erat, Horák) (PP) – 07:09	1–0
	1–1	14:47 – Rüfenacht (Ambühl, Suter)
Kubalík (Kovář, Kolář) – 43:02	2–1
Červenka (Kolář) (ENG) – 58:40	3–1
Řepík (Birner, Nakládal) (ENG) – 59:11	4–1

10 min
Penalties
2 min
28
Shots
29

Qualification playoff

20 February 2018; 21:10	Switzerland	1–2 OT (0–1, 1–0, 0–0) (OT: 0–1)	Germany	Kwandong Hockey Centre, Pyeongchang; Attendance: 2,878

Game reference

Jonas Hiller
Goalies
Danny aus den Birken
Referees:
(Czech Republic) Jan Hribik
(Sweden) Linus Öhlund
Linesmen:
(United States) Fraser McIntyre
(Finland) Hannu Sormunen

	0–1	01:19 – Pföderl (Hördler, Hager) (PP)
Moser (Ambühl, Suter) – 23:40	1–1
	1–2	60:26 – Seidenberg (Kahun, Mauer)

29 min
Penalties
12 min
21
Shots
25

=== Women's tournament ===
Switzerland women's national ice hockey team qualified by winning the final qualification tournament in Arosa, Switzerland.

Team roster

The following is the Swiss roster for the women's ice hockey tournament at the 2018 Winter Olympics.

Head coach: (Switzerland) Daniela Diaz Assistant coaches: (Switzerland) Angela Frautschi, (Switzerland) Steve Huard

No.	Pos.	Name	Height	Weight	Birthdate	Birthplace	2017–18 team
1	G	Janine Alder	1.65 m (5 ft 5 in)	55 kg (121 lb)	5 July 1995	Urnäsch	(United States) St. Cloud State Huskies (WCHA)
3	F	Sarah Forster	1.69 m (5 ft 7 in)	64 kg (141 lb)	19 May 1993	Berneck	(Switzerland) EV Bomo Thun (SWHL A)
7	F	Lara Stalder – A	1.67 m (5 ft 6 in)	65 kg (143 lb)	15 May 1994	Lucerne	(Sweden) Linköpings HC (SWHL)
8	D	Nicole Gass	1.72 m (5 ft 8 in)	70 kg (150 lb)	18 August 1993	Zürich	(Switzerland) ZSC Lions (SWHL A)
9	D	Shannon Sigrist	1.69 m (5 ft 7 in)	64 kg (141 lb)	20 April 1999	Hombrechtikon	(Switzerland) ZSC Lions (SWHL A)
11	D	Sabrina Zollinger	1.65 m (5 ft 5 in)	63 kg (139 lb)	27 March 1993	Zürich	(Sweden) HV71 (SWHL)
12	F	Lisa Rüedi	1.67 m (5 ft 6 in)	66 kg (146 lb)	3 November 2000	Thusis	(Switzerland) GCK Lions (SWHL B)
13	F	Sara Benz	1.65 m (5 ft 5 in)	58 kg (128 lb)	25 August 1992	Zürich	(Switzerland) ZSC Lions (SWHL A)
14	F	Evelina Raselli – A	1.69 m (5 ft 7 in)	63 kg (139 lb)	3 May 1992	Poschiavo	(Switzerland) HC Lugano (SWHL A)
15	F	Monika Waidacher	1.73 m (5 ft 8 in)	68 kg (150 lb)	9 July 1990	Zürich	(Switzerland) ZSC Lions (SWHL A)
16	F	Nina Waidacher	1.69 m (5 ft 7 in)	61 kg (134 lb)	23 August 1995	Arosa	(Switzerland) ZSC Lions (SWHL A)
18	F	Tess Allemann	1.68 m (5 ft 6 in)	63 kg (139 lb)	7 April 1998	Farnern	(Switzerland) EV Bomo Thun (SWHL A)
19	D	Christine Meier	1.69 m (5 ft 7 in)	69 kg (152 lb)	12 February 1986	Zürich	(Switzerland) ZSC Lions (SWHL A)
21	D	Laura Benz	1.72 m (5 ft 8 in)	63 kg (139 lb)	25 August 1992	Zürich	(Switzerland) ZSC Lions (SWHL A)
22	D	Livia Altmann – C	1.65 m (5 ft 5 in)	65 kg (143 lb)	13 December 1994	Chur	(United States) Colgate Raiders (ECAC)
23	D	Nicole Bullo	1.60 m (5 ft 3 in)	54 kg (119 lb)	18 July 1987	Bellinzona	(Switzerland) HC Lugano (SWHL A)
24	F	Isabel Waidacher	1.62 m (5 ft 4 in)	56 kg (123 lb)	25 July 1994	Arosa	(Switzerland) ZSC Lions (SWHL A)
25	F	Alina Müller	1.67 m (5 ft 6 in)	62 kg (137 lb)	12 March 1998	Lengnau	(Switzerland) ZSC Lions (NL)
26	F	Dominique Rüegg	1.72 m (5 ft 8 in)	70 kg (150 lb)	5 February 1996	St. Gallenkappel	(Switzerland) ZSC Lions (SWHL A)
27	D	Stefanie Wetli	1.73 m (5 ft 8 in)	57 kg (126 lb)	4 February 2000	Winterthur	(Switzerland) EHC Winterthur
31	G	Andrea Brändli	1.69 m (5 ft 7 in)	70 kg (150 lb)	5 June 1997	Wald	(Switzerland) EHC Schaffhausen (SWHL C)
41	G	Florence Schelling	1.75 m (5 ft 9 in)	65 kg (143 lb)	9 March 1989	Zürich	(Sweden) Linköpings HC (SWHL)
88	F	Phoebe Stänz	1.63 m (5 ft 4 in)	62 kg (137 lb)	7 January 1994	Zetzwil	(Sweden) SDE Hockey (SWHL)

Preliminary round

Pos	Team	Pld	W	OTW	OTL	L	GF	GA	GD	Pts	Qualification
1	Switzerland	3	3	0	0	0	13	2	+11	9	Quarterfinals
2	Sweden	3	2	0	0	1	11	3	+8	6	Quarterfinals
3	Japan	3	1	0	0	2	6	6	0	3	Classification
4	Korea (H)	3	0	0	0	3	1	20	−19	0	Classification

Source: IIHF
(H) Host

10 February 2018; 21:10	Switzerland	8–0 (3–0, 3–0, 2–0)	Korea	Kwandong Hockey Centre, Gangneung; Attendance: 3,606

Game reference

Florence Schelling
Goalies
Shin So-jung
Referees:
(United States) Dina Allen
(Canada) Gabrielle Ariano-Lortie
Linesmen:
(United States) Jessica Leclerc
(Canada) Justine Todd

Müller (S. Benz) (SH) – 10:23	1–0
Müller (S. Benz, Stalder) – 11:24	2–0
Müller (S. Benz, Meier) – 19:49	3–0
Müller – 21:26	4–0
Stänz (Raselli) – 22:21	5–0
Stänz (Raselli) – 37:19	6–0
Stalder (Meier, Müller) (PP) – 49:42	7–0
Stalder (Müller) – 51:48	8–0

12 min
Penalties
6 min
52
Shots
8

12 February 2018; 16:40	Switzerland	3–1 (0–0, 2–0, 1–1)	Japan	Kwandong Hockey Centre, Gangneung; Attendance: 4,033

Game reference

Florence Schelling
Goalies
Nana Fujimoto
Referees:
(Sweden) Gabriella Gran
(Norway) Aina Hove
Linesmen:
(Finland) Jenni Heikkinen
(Slovenia) Natasa Pagon

S. Benz (Rüegg, L. Benz) (PP) – 30:19	1–0
S. Benz (Meier) (PP) – 33:10	2–0
Müller – 44:27	3–0
	3–1	47:33 – Kubo (Hori, H. Toko)

10 min
Penalties
8 min
18
Shots
38

14 February 2018; 12:10	Sweden	1–2 (0–0, 0–1, 1–1)	Switzerland	Kwandong Hockey Centre, Gangneung; Attendance: 3,545

Game reference

Sara Grahn
Goalies
Florence Schelling
Referees:
(Slovakia) Nikoleta Celárová
(United States) Katie Guay
Linesmen:
(France) Charlotte Girard-Fabre
(Germany) Lisa Linnek

	0–1	33:51 – Müller (Meier, Stalder) (PP)
Borgqvist (Olsson, Nyhlén Persson) (PP) – 47:35	1–1
	1–2	51:28 – Stänz (Meier, Müller) (PP)

12 min
Penalties
8 min
34
Shots
47

Quarterfinal

17 February 2018; 12:10	Olympic Athletes from Russia	6–2 (1–0, 2–2, 3–0)	Switzerland	Kwandong Hockey Centre, Gangneung; Attendance: 3,903

Game reference

Nadezhda Morozova
Goalies
Florence Schelling
Referees:
(Slovakia) Nikoleta Celárová
(Sweden) Gabriella Gran
Linesmen:
(France) Charlotte Girard-Fabre
(Finland) Johanna Tauriainen

Shokhina (SH2) – 07:22	1–0
	1–1	20:48 – Müller (Meier)
	1–2	31:47 – Stalder (Stänz, Meier) (PP)
Kulishova (Smolina) – 33:53	2–2
Ganeyeva (Shokhina) (PP) – 38:53	3–2
Dergachyova (Shokhina) – 47:36	4–2
Shokhina (Dergachyova) (PP) – 53:25	5–2
Sosina (SH, ENG) – 59:08	6–2

12 min
Penalties
8 min
21
Shots
19

5–8th place semifinal

18 February 2018; 12:10	Switzerland	2–0 (1–0, 1–0, 0–0)	Korea	Kwandong Hockey Centre, Gangneung; Attendance: 3,811

Game reference
Janine Alder	Goalies	Shin So-jung	Referees: (Canada) Gabrielle Ariano-Lortie (Sweden) Katarina Timglas; Linesmen: (Finland) Jenni Heikkinen (Sweden) Veronica Johansson
Zollinger (Bullo, L. Benz) (PP) – 16:35 / 1–0; Raselli (Rüegg, Altmann) – 38:52 / 2–0			Referees: (Canada) Gabrielle Ariano-Lortie (Sweden) Katarina Timglas; Linesmen: (Finland) Jenni Heikkinen (Sweden) Veronica Johansson
2 min	Penalties	8 min	Referees: (Canada) Gabrielle Ariano-Lortie (Sweden) Katarina Timglas; Linesmen: (Finland) Jenni Heikkinen (Sweden) Veronica Johansson
53	Shots	19	Referees: (Canada) Gabrielle Ariano-Lortie (Sweden) Katarina Timglas; Linesmen: (Finland) Jenni Heikkinen (Sweden) Veronica Johansson

Fifth place game

20 February 2018; 16:40	Switzerland	1–0 (1–0, 0–0, 0–0)	Japan	Kwandong Hockey Centre, Gangneung; Attendance: 3,958

Game reference
Florence Schelling	Goalies	Nana Fujimoto	Referees: (Sweden) Gabriella Gran (Sweden) Katarina Timglas; Linesmen: (France) Charlotte Girard-Fabre (Sweden) Veronica Johansson
Raselli – 03:19 / 1–0			Referees: (Sweden) Gabriella Gran (Sweden) Katarina Timglas; Linesmen: (France) Charlotte Girard-Fabre (Sweden) Veronica Johansson
6 min	Penalties	4 min	Referees: (Sweden) Gabriella Gran (Sweden) Katarina Timglas; Linesmen: (France) Charlotte Girard-Fabre (Sweden) Veronica Johansson
14	Shots	20	Referees: (Sweden) Gabriella Gran (Sweden) Katarina Timglas; Linesmen: (France) Charlotte Girard-Fabre (Sweden) Veronica Johansson

== Luge ==
Based on the results from the World Cups during the 2017–18 Luge World Cup season, Switzerland qualified 2 sleds. However they declined one of the quotas.

Athlete	Event	Run 1		Run 2		Run 3		Run 4		Total	
Athlete	Event	Time	Rank	Time	Rank	Time	Rank	Time	Rank	Time	Rank
Martina Kocher	Women's singles	46.837	17	46.657	15	46.638	11	46.671	10	3:06.893	11

== Nordic combined ==
Based on the results from the World Cups during the 2016–17 season and the 2017–18 season up to January 22, Tim Hug was the only athlete to meet the required points tally. On 22 January 2018, his selection was confirmed by the Swiss Olympic Association.

Athlete	Event	Ski jumping			Cross-country		Total	
Athlete	Event	Distance	Points	Rank	Time	Rank	Time	Rank
Tim Hug	Normal hill/10 km	97.0	90.9	26	24:59.4	25	27:38.4	27
Tim Hug	Large hill/10 km	117.5	104.6	27	24:23.5	30	26:40.5	24

== Skeleton ==
Based on the world rankings, Switzerland qualified 2 sleds, one female and one male athlete. However they declined one of the quotas.

Athlete	Event	Run 1		Run 2		Run 3		Run 4		Total	
Athlete	Event	Time	Rank	Time	Rank	Time	Rank	Time	Rank	Time	Rank
Marina Gilardoni	Women's	52.34	10	52.35	12	52.28	10	52.46	13	3:29.43	11

== Ski jumping ==
According to the quota allocation list published by the FIS, Switzerland were allowed to enter four male athletes. However, on 25 January the Swiss Olympic Association announced it would be declining two of the places, and therefore also would not be entering the team event.

Athlete	Event	Qualification			First round			Final			Total	
Athlete	Event	Distance	Points	Rank	Distance	Points	Rank	Distance	Points	Rank	Points	Rank
Simon Ammann	Men's normal hill	102.0	122.3	10 Q	105.0	119.4	11 Q	104.5	117.2	10	236.6	11
Simon Ammann	Men's large hill	140.0	122.6	10 Q	133.5	131.6	10 Q	130.5	125.0	13	256.6	13
Gregor Deschwanden	Men's normal hill	89.5	92.3	43 Q	99.5	100.1	29 Q	91.5	85.2	29	185.3	29
Gregor Deschwanden	Men's large hill	128.0	103.5	24 Q	123.0	105.8	36	Did not advance				

== Snowboarding ==
According to the quota allocation system determined by the FIS, Switzerland were allocated the maximum allowance of a team of 25 athletes. The Swiss Olympic Association announced their selections on 29 January 2018. Elias Allenspach was a late replacement for David Hablützel who could not recover in time from a concussion and bruising.

Freestyle
Men

Athlete	Event	Qualification				Final				
Athlete	Event	Run 1	Run 2	Best	Rank	Run 1	Run 2	Run 3	Best	Rank
Elias Allenspach	Halfpipe	23.75	25.50	25.50	27	Did not advance				
Patrick Burgener	Halfpipe	82.00	50.25	82.00	9 Q	84.00	51.00	89.75	89.75	5
Jan Scherrer	Halfpipe	84.00	16.00	84.00	6 Q	31.25	80.50	70.75	80.50	9
Jonas Bösiger	Big air	96.00	35.25	96.00	2 Q	77.50	JNS	40.75	118.25	8
Jonas Bösiger	Slopestyle	18.68	58.26	58.26	9	Did not advance				
Nicolas Huber	Big air	76.75	44.50	76.75	13	Did not advance				
Nicolas Huber	Slopestyle	34.25	36.90	36.90	16	Did not advance				
Michael Schärer	Big air	87.00	44.00	87.00	5 Q	JNS	62.25	78.50	140.75	6
Michael Schärer	Slopestyle	37.61	27.01	37.61	14	Did not advance				
Moritz Thönen	Big air	DNS				Did not advance				
Moritz Thönen	Slopestyle	19.53	23.55	23.55	16	Did not advance				

Women

Athlete	Event	Qualification				Final				
Athlete	Event	Run 1	Run 2	Best	Rank	Run 1	Run 2	Run 3	Best	Rank
Verena Rohrer	Halfpipe	16.50	55.00	55.00	14	Did not advance				
Sina Candrian	Big air	31.75	86.00	86.00	8 Q	JNS	76.25	64.00	140.25	5
Sina Candrian	Slopestyle	Canceled				66.35	39.80	CAN	66.35	7
Isabel Derungs	Big air	54.00	59.25	59.25	22	Did not advance				
Isabel Derungs	Slopestyle	Canceled				39.66	31.98	CAN	39.66	18
Elena Könz	Big air	62.00	65.75	65.75	18	Did not advance				
Elena Könz	Slopestyle	Canceled				17.28	59.00	CAN	59.00	10
Carla Somaini	Big air	70.75	24.75	70.75	15	Did not advance				
Carla Somaini	Slopestyle	Canceled				36.71	23.08	CAN	36.71	20

Qualification Legend: QF – Qualify directly to final; QS – Qualify to semifinal

Parallel

Athlete	Event	Qualification		Round of 16	Quarterfinal	Semifinal	Final / BM	
Athlete	Event	Time	Rank	Opposition Time	Opposition Time	Opposition Time	Opposition Time	Rank
Dario Caviezel	Men's giant slalom	1:26.39	22	Did not advance				
Kaspar Flütsch	Men's giant slalom	1:26.26	21	Did not advance				
Nevin Galmarini	Men's giant slalom	1:24.78	1 Q	Mastnak (SLO); W –0.38	Fischnaller (ITA); W –0.06	Dufour (FRA); W DNF	Lee S–h (KOR); W –0.43	1st place, gold medalist(s)
Ladina Jenny	Women's giant slalom	1:33.19	12 Q	Hofmeister (GER); L DNF	Did not advance			
Patrizia Kummer	Women's giant slalom	1:33.59	16 Q	Ledecká (CZE); L +0.78	Did not advance			
Stefanie Müller	Women's giant slalom	1:35.39	23	Did not advance				
Julie Zogg	Women's giant slalom	1:32.89	7 Q	Król (POL); W –0.70	Zavarzina (OAR); L +1.88	Did not advance		

Snowboard cross

Athlete	Event	Seeding						1/8 final	Quarterfinal	Semifinal	Final	
Athlete	Event	Run 1		Run 2		Best	Seed	1/8 final	Quarterfinal	Semifinal	Final	
Athlete	Event	Time	Rank	Time	Rank	Best	Seed	Position	Position	Position	Position	Rank
Kalle Koblet	Men's snowboard cross	1:14.25	9	Bye		1:14.25	9	3 Q	DNF	Did not advance		
Jérôme Lymann	Men's snowboard cross	1:14.77	21	Bye		1:14.77	21	1 Q	4	Did not advance		
Lara Casanova	Women's snowboard cross	1:22.26	20	DNS		1:22.26	21	—N/a	4	Did not advance		
Alexandra Hasler	Women's snowboard cross	1:20.87	13	1:20.49	4	1:20.49	16	—N/a	5	Did not advance		
Simona Meiler	Women's snowboard cross	1:18.95	7	Bye		1:18.95	7	—N/a	6	Did not advance		

Qualification legend: FA – Qualify to medal round; FB – Qualify to consolation round
* Qualify immediately to consolation round after being disqualified in the semifinals

== Speed skating ==
Based on the quota allocation system, Switzerland qualified one skater in the Men's 1500m, Men's 5000m, Men's mass start and Women's mass start. The Swiss Olympic Association confirmed the selections on 15 January 2018.

Individual

Athlete	Event	Final	
Athlete	Event	Time	Rank
Livio Wenger	Men's 1500 m	1:47.76	25
Livio Wenger	Men's 5000 m	6:24.16	17

Mass start

Athlete	Event	Semifinal			Final		
Athlete	Event	Points	Time	Rank	Points	Time	Rank
Livio Wenger	Men's mass start	5	8:17.17	7 Q	11	8:13.08	4
Ramona Härdi	Women's mass start	0	2:49.59	12	Did not advance		
