= Freestyle skiing at the 2018 Winter Olympics – Women's ski cross =

Event in the 2018 Winter Olympics

Women's ski cross at the XXIII Olympic Winter Games
- Venue: Bogwang Phoenix Park, Pyeongchang, South Korea
- Dates: 22 February (seeding); 23 February (elimination round)
- Competitors: 23 from 13 nations

Medalists
1st place, gold medalist(s)		Kelsey Serwa	Canada
2nd place, silver medalist(s)		Brittany Phelan	Canada
3rd place, bronze medalist(s)		Fanny Smith	Switzerland

The Women's ski cross event in freestyle skiing at the 2018 Winter Olympics took place on 22 and 23 February 2018 at the Bogwang Phoenix Park, Pyeongchang, South Korea.

== Qualification ==
The top 32 athletes in the Olympic quota allocation list qualified, with a maximum of four athletes per National Olympic Committee (NOC) allowed. All athletes qualifying must also have placed in the top 30 of a FIS World Cup event or the FIS Freestyle Ski and Snowboarding World Championships 2017 during the qualification period (1 July 2016 to 21 January 2018) and also have a minimum of 80 FIS points to compete. If the host country, South Korea at the 2018 Winter Olympics did not qualify, their chosen athlete would displace the last qualified athlete, granted all qualification criterion was met.

== Results ==
=== Seeding ===
The seeding round was held on 22 February at 10:00.

Rank	Bib	Name	Country	Time	Difference
1	13	Marielle Thompson	Canada	1:13.11	−
2	15	Kelsey Serwa	Canada	1:13.33	+0.22
3	9	Brittany Phelan	Canada	1:13.56	+0.45
4	1	Sandra Näslund	Sweden	1:13.58	+0.47
5	12	Fanny Smith	Switzerland	1:13.90	+0.79
6	3	Alizée Baron	France	1:14.11	+1.00
7	7	Katrin Ofner	Austria	1:14.30	+1.19
8	5	Andrea Limbacher	Austria	1:14.71	+1.60
9	6	Sami Kennedy-Sim	Australia	1:14.97	+1.86
10	16	Sanna Lüdi	Switzerland	1:15.13	+2.02
11	10	India Sherret	Canada	1:15.48	+2.37
12	14	Marielle Berger Sabbatel	France	1:15.60	+2.49
13	18	Nikol Kučerová	Czech Republic	1:15.61	+2.50
14	11	Debora Pixner	Italy	1:15.72	+2.61
15	4	Anastasiia Chirtcova	Olympic Athletes from Russia	1:15.83	+2.72
16	19	Talina Gantenbein	Switzerland	1:15.97	+2.86
17	2	Lisa Andersson	Sweden	1:16.15	+3.04
18	24	Stephanie Joffroy	Chile	1:16.70	+3.59
19	20	Victoria Zavadovskaya	Olympic Athletes from Russia	1:16.80	+3.69
20	8	Julia Eichinger	Germany	1:17.56	+4.45
21	17	Reina Umehara	Japan	1:17.81	+4.70
22	23	Emily Sarsfield	Great Britain	1:18.25	+5.14
23	22	Priscillia Annen	Switzerland	2:30.03	+1:16.92
24	21	Lucrezia Fantelli	Italy	DNS	

=== Elimination round ===
A knockout stage was held to determine the winner.

==== 1/8 finals ====
Heat 1

Rank	Bib	Name	Country	Notes
1	17	Lisa Andersson	Sweden	Q
2	16	Talina Gantenbein	Switzerland	Q
3	1	Marielle Thompson	Canada	

Heat 2

Rank	Bib	Name	Country	Notes
1	8	Andrea Limbacher	Austria	Q
2	9	Sami Kennedy-Sim	Australia	Q
	24	Lucrezia Fantelli	Italy	DNS

Heat 3

Rank	Bib	Name	Country	Notes
1	5	Fanny Smith	Switzerland	Q
2	12	Marielle Berger Sabbatel	France	Q
3	21	Reina Umehara	Japan	

Heat 4

Rank	Bib	Name	Country	Notes
1	4	Sandra Näslund	Sweden	Q
2	13	Nikol Kučerová	Czech Republic	Q
3	20	Julia Eichinger	Germany	

Heat 5

Rank	Bib	Name	Country	Notes
1	3	Brittany Phelan	Canada	Q
2	14	Debora Pixner	Italy	Q
3	19	Victoria Zavadovskaya	Olympic Athletes from Russia	

Heat 6

Rank	Bib	Name	Country	Notes
1	6	Alizée Baron	France	Q
2	22	Emily Sarsfield	Great Britain	Q
	11	India Sherret	Canada	DNF

Heat 7

Rank	Bib	Name	Country	Notes
1	7	Katrin Ofner	Austria	Q
2	10	Sanna Lüdi	Switzerland	Q
3	23	Priscillia Annen	Switzerland	

Heat 8

Rank	Bib	Name	Country	Notes
1	2	Kelsey Serwa	Canada	Q
2	15	Anastasiia Chirtcova	Olympic Athletes from Russia	Q
3	18	Stephanie Joffroy	Chile	

==== Quarterfinals ====
Heat 1

Rank	Bib	Name	Country	Notes
1	9	Sami Kennedy-Sim	Australia	Q
2	17	Lisa Andersson	Sweden	Q
3	16	Talina Gantenbein	Switzerland	
4	8	Andrea Limbacher	Austria	DNF

Heat 2

Rank	Bib	Name	Country	Notes
1	5	Fanny Smith	Switzerland	Q
2	4	Sandra Näslund	Sweden	Q
3	12	Marielle Berger Sabbatel	France	
4	13	Nikol Kučerová	Czech Republic	

Heat 3

Rank	Bib	Name	Country	Notes
1	3	Brittany Phelan	Canada	Q
2	6	Alizée Baron	France	Q
3	14	Debora Pixner	Italy	
4	22	Emily Sarsfield	Great Britain	

Heat 4

Rank	Bib	Name	Country	Notes
1	2	Kelsey Serwa	Canada	Q
2	10	Sanna Lüdi	Switzerland	Q
3	7	Katrin Ofner	Austria	
	15	Anastasiia Chirtcova	Olympic Athletes from Russia	

==== Semifinals ====
Heat 1

Rank	Bib	Name	Country	Notes
1	4	Sandra Näslund	Sweden	BF
2	5	Fanny Smith	Switzerland	BF
3	9	Sami Kennedy-Sim	Australia	SF
4	17	Lisa Andersson	Sweden	SF

Heat 2

Rank	Bib	Name	Country	Notes
1	3	Brittany Phelan	Canada	BF
2	2	Kelsey Serwa	Canada	BF
3	10	Sanna Lüdi	Switzerland	SF
	6	Alizée Baron	France	DNF, SF

==== Finals ====
Small final

Rank	Bib	Name	Country	Notes
5	6	Alizée Baron	France	
6	17	Lisa Andersson	Sweden	
7	10	Sanna Lüdi	Switzerland	
8	9	Sami Kennedy-Sim	Australia	

Big final

Rank	Bib	Name	Country	Notes
1st place, gold medalist(s)	2	Kelsey Serwa	Canada	
2nd place, silver medalist(s)	3	Brittany Phelan	Canada	
3rd place, bronze medalist(s)	5	Fanny Smith	Switzerland	
4	4	Sandra Näslund	Sweden	
