= Debora Pixner =

Italian freestyle skier

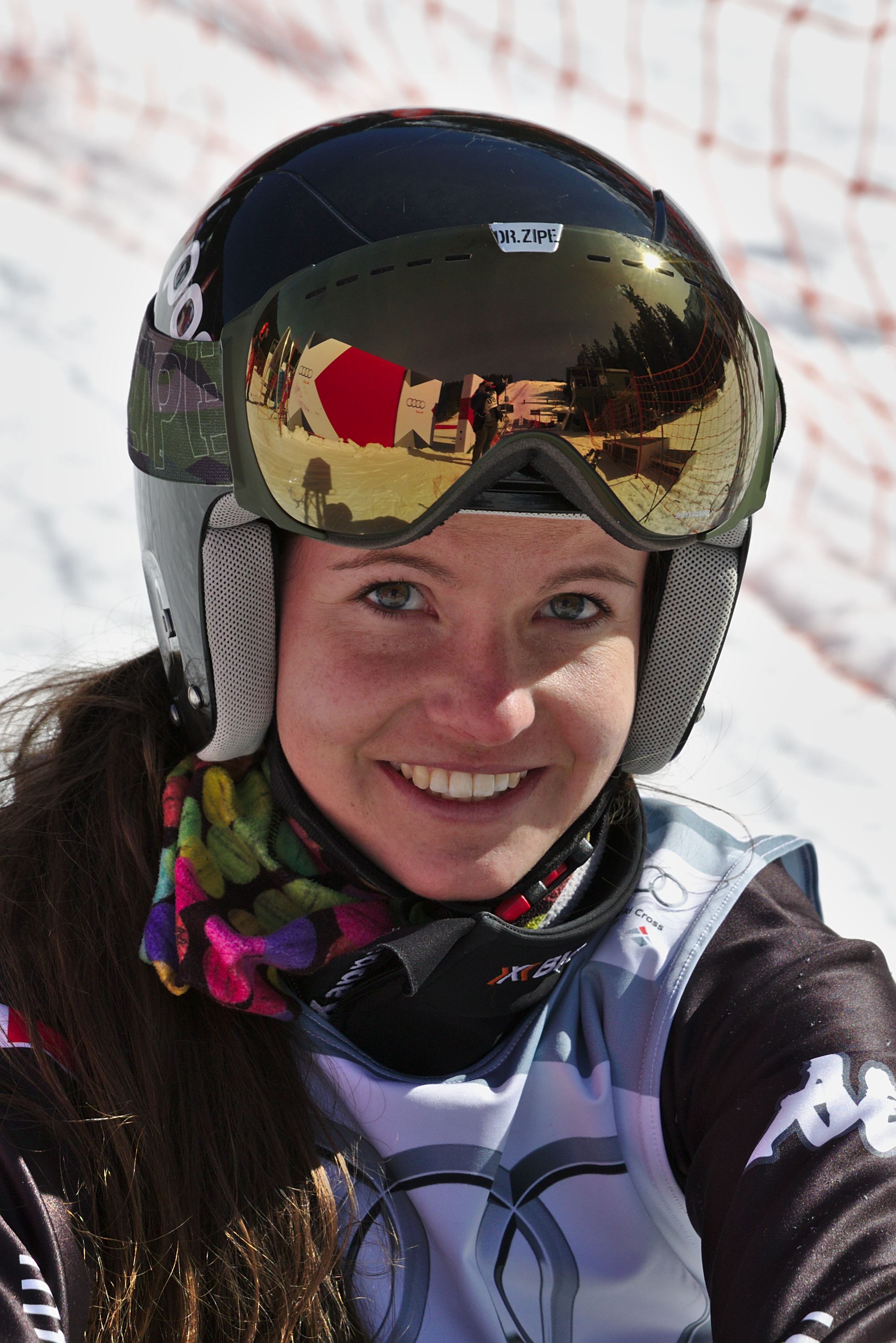
- Debora Pixner in 2015

Personal information
- Born: 24 September 1992 (age 32); Meran, South Tyrol, Italy

Sport
- Country: Italy
- Sport: freestyle skiing

Debora Pixner (born 24 September 1992) is an Italian freestyle skier. She competed in the 2018 Winter Olympics, in ski cross.
