= Alexandra Edebo =

Swedish skicrossier (born 1996)

- Country: Sweden
- Full name: Alexandra Elisabeth Edebo
- Born: 3 March 1996 (age 29); Solna, Stockholm County, Sweden
- Ski club: IFK Mora

Alexandra Elisabeth Edebo (born 3 March 1996) is a Swedish retired skicrosser who competed in the 2022 Winter Olympics.

== Early life ==
Alexandra Edebo was born on 3 March 1996 in Solna, Stockholm County, Sweden. She grew up in Venjan, where her maternal grandmother is from, and learned to ski there. She has two sisters, both skiers, including Veronica who competed in the 2016 Winter Youth Olympics.

She attended a skicross and alpine skiing academy in Torsby, Värmland County.

== Career ==
In 2013, Edebo competed in her first International Ski Federation (FIS) race in Arosa, Switzerland, in 2013, placing 11th. That year, she was also selected for her first Junior World Championships, where she placed 26th overall. After that, Edebo competed at the Swedish national competitions in Kläppen, Sälen where she placed 3rd behind Sandra Näslund and Erika Thunstedt.

In 2014, she competed in the Europa Cup in Watles, Italy, where she placed 12th. She then placed 10th at that year's Junior Championships.

Edebo competed in the 2022 Winter Olympics in freestyle skiing in the ski cross category. She placed 10th in the seeding run and was eliminated in heat 4, placing 13th overall.

After retiring from the Olympics, she competes locally at IFK Mora's alpine skiing club. She retired from the ski cross sport in 2022 after receiving three concussions in two years, ending her competitive career.
