= Hannah Schmidt =

Canadian freestyle skier

Personal information
- Born: 4 August 1994 (age 31) Ottawa, Ontario, Canada

Sport
- Country: Canada
- Sport: Freestyle skiing
- Event: Ski cross

Hannah Schmidt (born 4 August 1994) is a Canadian freestyle skier who competes internationally in the ski cross discipline.

== Career ==
Schmidt has been part of the national team since 2018. In 2021, Schmidt has a breakout season, marked by a top 10 performance at the World Championships.

On January 24, 2022, Schmidt was named to Canada's 2022 Olympic team along with her brother Jared Schmidt, who will also compete in the men's ski cross event.
