= Victoria Zavadovskaya =

Russian freestyle skier

Personal information
- Born: 16 January 1996 (age 29); Elista, Kalmykia, Soviet Union

Sport
- Country: Russia
- Sport: freestyle skiing
- Event: ski cross

Victoria Andreyevna Zavadovskaya (Russian: Виктория Андреевна Завадовская; born 16 January 1996) is a Russian freestyle skier.

She competed in the 2017 FIS Freestyle World Ski Championships, and in the 2018 Winter Olympics, in ski cross.
