= Lisa Andersson =

Swedish freestyle skier

Personal information
- Born: 2 August 1997 (age 27)

Sport
- Country: Sweden
- Sport: freestyle skiing
- Event: ski cross

Lisa Andersson (born 2 August 1997) is a Swedish freestyle skier.

She competed in the ski cross event during the 2018 Winter Olympics.

After the Olympic games Andersson swapped event to Crossfit instead, where she has made a rocket career and is among the top contestants in Europe.
