= Thomas Rüfenacht =

Swiss-American ice hockey player

Thomas Rufenacht
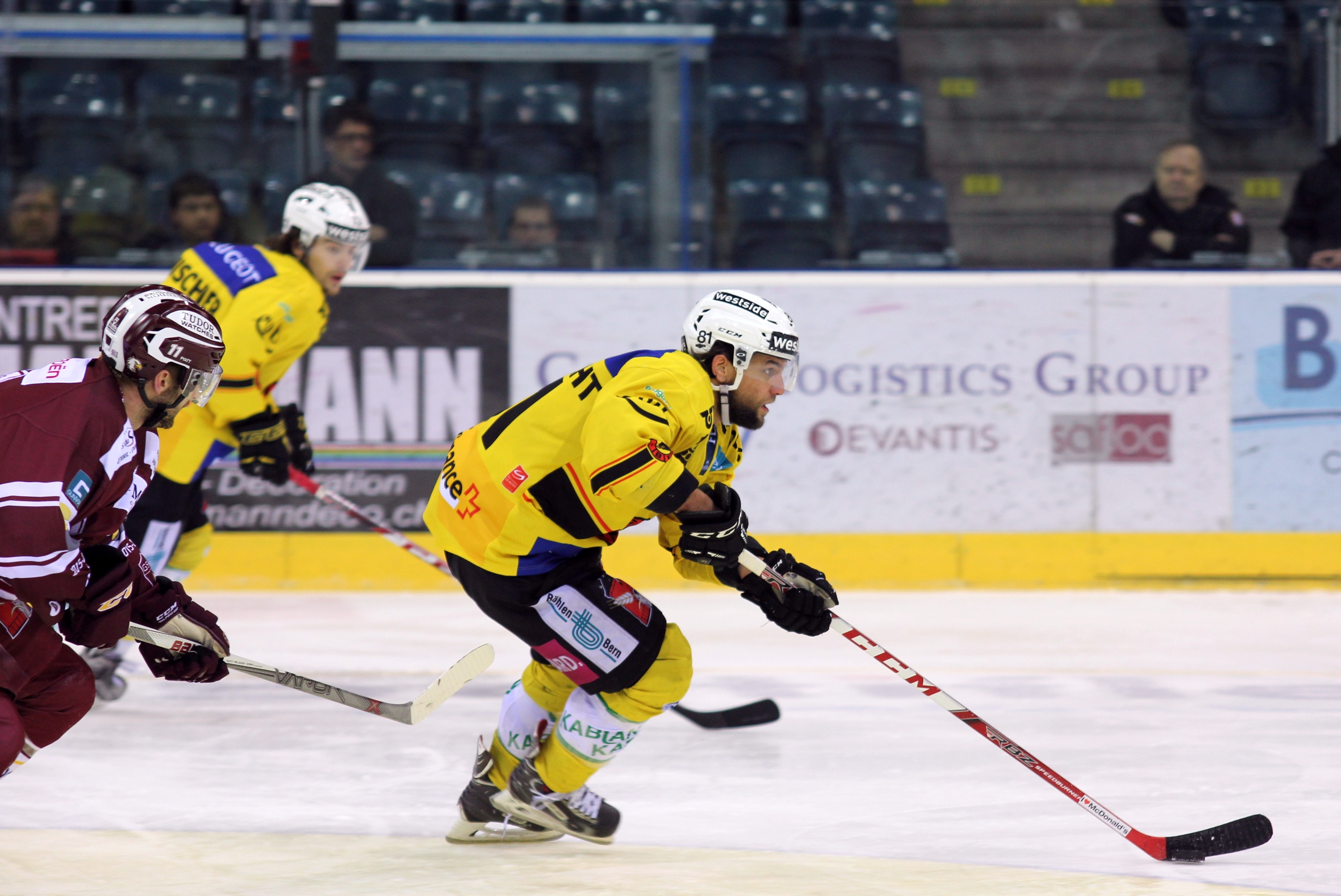
- Born: February 22, 1985 (age 40); Meggen, Switzerland
- Height: 5 ft 11 in (180 cm)
- Weight: 187 lb (85 kg; 13 st 5 lb)
- Position: Winger
- Shoots: Left
- NL team Former teams: HC Ambrì-Piotta; SCL Tigers; Genève-Servette HC; Lausanne HC; EV Zug; HC Lugano; SC Bern
- National team: Switzerland
- NHL draft: Undrafted
- Playing career: 2003–present

Thomas Rufenacht (born February 22, 1985) is a Swiss-American professional ice hockey player who is currently playing with HC Ambrì-Piotta of the National League (NL).

== Playing career ==
On November 4, 2013, Rüfenacht agreed to a three-year contract with SC Bern. On October 27, 2016, he signed a three-year contract extension with Bern worth CHF 1.2 million.

On November 5, 2019, Rüfenacht was signed to a two-year contract extension worth CHF 1.4 mio by Bern, through the 2021/22 season.

== International play ==
Rufenacht was named to the Switzerland men's national ice hockey team for competition at the 2014 IIHF World Championship.

== Career statistics ==
=== Regular season and playoffs ===
			Regular season					Playoffs
Season	Team	League	GP	G	A	Pts	PIM	GP	G	A	Pts	PIM
2002–03	Culver Military Academy	HS-Prep	—	—	—	—	—	—	—	—	—	—
2003–04	SCL Tigers	SUI U20	28	8	11	19	164	—	—	—	—	—
2003–04	SCL Tigers	NLA	10	1	0	1	2	—	—	—	—	—
2003–04	EHC Brandis	SUI.3	5	1	2	3	—	—	—	—	—	—
2004–05	SCL Tigers	SUI U20	35	11	16	27	112	—	—	—	—	—
2004–05	SCL Tigers	NLA	13	0	0	0	0	—	—	—	—	—
2005–06	EHC Visp	SUI.2	34	5	7	12	26	7	0	2	2	2
2005–06	EHC Saastal	SUI.3	5	2	4	6	22	—	—	—	—	—
2006–07	EHC Visp	SUI.2	44	26	35	61	102	16	5	8	13	12
2007–08	Lausanne HC	SUI.2	39	26	29	55	58	11	2	4	6	36
2007–08	Genève–Servette HC	NLA	3	0	0	0	0	5	0	0	0	0
2008–09	Lausanne HC	SUI.2	45	22	29	51	105	15	10	11	21	22
2008–09	Genève–Servette HC	NLA	1	0	0	0	0	—	—	—	—	—
2009–10	EV Zug	NLA	44	8	8	16	63	13	0	1	1	32
2009–10	EHC Visp	SUI.2	1	1	0	1	2	—	—	—	—	—
2010–11	EV Zug	NLA	50	6	12	18	119	10	1	1	2	47
2011–12	EV Zug	NLA	43	7	11	18	112	9	2	2	4	8
2012–13	HC Lugano	NLA	40	14	17	31	36	3	1	0	1	2
2013–14	HC Lugano	NLA	37	11	10	21	76	5	1	1	2	26
2014–15	SC Bern	NLA	45	8	9	17	53	11	0	2	2	4
2015–16	SC Bern	NLA	37	6	15	21	26	14	3	4	7	20
2016–17	SC Bern	NLA	36	7	15	22	22	16	7	11	18	49
2017–18	SC Bern	NL	40	17	14	31	42	11	1	4	5	20
2018–19	SC Bern	NL	47	12	12	24	80	17	3	5	8	12
2019–20	SC Bern	NL	50	7	21	28	76	—	—	—	—	—
2020–21	SC Bern	NL	8	0	1	1	27	—	—	—	—	—
2021–22	SC Bern	NL	10	0	0	0	2	—	—	—	—	—
2022–23	HC Ambrì-Piotta	NL	8	1	4	5	2	—	—	—	—	—
NL totals			522	105	149	254	738	114	19	31	50	220

=== International ===
Year	Team	Event	GP	G	A	Pts	PIM
2014	Switzerland	WC	7	0	0	0	2
2017	Switzerland	WC	8	0	1	1	2
2018	Switzerland	OG	4	2	1	3	2
Senior totals			19	2	2	4	6
