= Courtney Hoffos =

Canadian freestyle skier (born 1997)

Personal information
- Born: 30 August 1997 (age 29) Invermere British Columbia, Canada

Sport
- Country: Canada
- Sport: Freestyle skiing
- Event: Ski cross
Medal record
Women's freestyle skiing
Representing Canada
World Championships
Silver medal – second place	2025 Engadin	Ski cross

Courtney Hoffos (born 30 August 1997) is a Canadian freestyle skier who competes internationally in the ski cross discipline.

== Career ==
Hoffos had a fifth-place finish at the 2021 World Championships. Hoffos has won multiple World Cup medals.

On January 24, 2022, Hoffos was named to Canada's 2022 Olympic team.

She had an eighth-place finish at the 2025 Skicross World Cup in Craigleith, Ontario.
