= Mikayla Martin =

Canadian skicrosser (1997–2019)

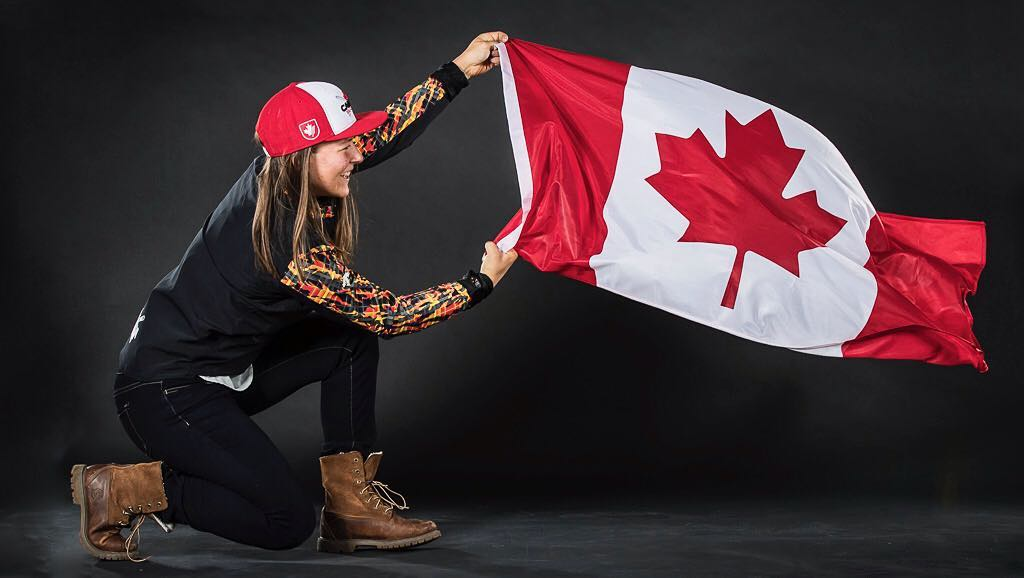

Personal information
- National team: Alpine Canada
- Citizenship: Canadian
- Born: 8 January 1997 Squamish, British Columbia
- Died: 1 October 2019 (aged 22) Squamish, BC

Sport
- Country: Canada
- Sport: Ski Cross
- Position: 2018 World Junior Champion

Mikayla Martin (8 January 1997 — 1 October 2019) was a Canadian alpine skiing, ski cross and mountain bike athlete holding multiple titles in both mountain biking and skiing racing. She raced with the British Columbia Alpine Ski Team from 2014 to 2017 and the Canadian Ski Cross Team from 2017 to 2019. Martin placed 4th in the 2017 Canadian National Championships and won gold at the 2018 World Junior Ski Cross Championships in Cardrona, New Zealand. She was promoted to the Canada Ski Cross World Cup team for the 2018-2019 season and at her first World Cup race in Arosa, Switzerland on Dec 16, 2018, she qualified third and finished 9th after failing to advance to the semi-finals. At her second World Cup race in Innichen, Italy on Dec 22, 2018 she finished 6th and qualified for the 2019 FIS Ski and Snowboard World Championships in Park City, Utah. At the 2019 World Championships, Martin finished 8th but was unable to start the small final due to an injury in the semi-finals that required medical attention.FIS Freestyle Ski and Snowboarding World Championships 2019.

== Biography ==
Martin was born in Squamish, British Columbia on 8 January 1997. She began skiing at the age of three years old and at the age of 8 decided she wanted to be a ski racer. She competed for the Whistler Mountain Ski Club as a youth and young adult. She placed sixth at the 2009 BC Provincial Championships and qualified for the 2010 BC Winter Games where she won two gold medals, one in slalom and one in giant slalom. Martin won the Teck BC Provincial Championships in March 2010 sweeping every race and the overall title yielding 6 gold medals. In the 2010 Whistler Cup, Mikayla won two silver medals helping Team Canada claim top honours over 12 other countries including the USA led by rising star Michaela Shiffrin. Martin repeated as BC Provincial Champion again in 2013 and helped Team Canada once again hoist the Whistler Cup.

Mikayla Martin was also a prolific mountain bike racer, winning multiple BC High-School Championships and BC Championships in both cross-country and downhill disciplines. In 2013 at the age of 16, she was given special status to compete as an under-age athlete for Team BC at the Canada Summer Games in Sherbrooke Quebec against 18 to 24 year olds and finished 6th in the Sprint event. She also raced in Whistler CrankWorx events gaining podiums and top 10 finishes over multiple years.

From 2014 to 2017, Martin competed on the BC Alpine Ski Team. During these years, Martin endured multiple injuries suffering two broken fibulas and two broken wrists from training accidents. However she still managed to race at the Nor-Am Cup primarily in the giant slalom and super G disciplines while also racing in downhill skiing, slalom skiing and alpine combined. Her best post-injury results came in 2015, when she had a top-8 finish at the downhill event at Lake Louise and the alpine combined event in Panorama.

In 2017, Martin became a member of the Canadian Ski Cross team for Alpine Canada in the C&D classes. Martin was renominated for Alpine Canada in 2018 and 2019. In 2018, Martin finished in the top three twice at Nor-Am Cup events and once at Europa Cup events. The following year, Martin won a Europa Cup event at Gudauri and had two third-place finishes at the Australian and New Zealand Cup. While competing at six ski cross events in the 2018–19 FIS Freestyle Ski World Cup season, Martin had a sixth place in Innichen, Italy.

In championships between 2014 and 2019, Martin was 4th at the 2017 National Championships in the Super G event. During this time period, she also was 10th in the Super G event during the 2015 National Junior Championships. At the 2018 FIS Freestyle Junior World Ski Championships, Martin won gold in ski cross. The following year, Martin reached the small final in ski cross at the FIS Freestyle Ski and Snowboarding World Championships 2019. During the race, Martin crashed and received a Did Not Start placing. On 1 October 2019, Martin died from an accident riding her mountain bike in Squamish. Outside of skiing, Martin had certifications in scuba diving and motorcycle riding. Following her death the community of Squamish came together to build an all levels mountain bike trail called Mikis Magic.
