= Elias Allenspach =

Swiss snowboarder (born 2001)

Personal information
- Full name: Elias Gian Allenspach
- Nationality: Swiss
- Born: 14 May 2001 (age 24) Singapore
- Height: 1.80 m (5 ft 11 in)

Sport
- Sport: Snowboard
- Event: Halfpipe
- Club: Ice Ripper
- Team: Swiss Snowboard Team

Elias Allenspach (born 14 May 2001) is a Swiss snowboarder who competed in the men's halfpipe at the 2018 Winter Olympics, but did not qualify for the medal round.
