= Priscillia Annen =

Swiss freestyle skier (born 1992)

Personal information
- Nationality: Swiss
- Born: 4 June 1992 (age 33)
- Height: 1.74 m (5 ft 9 in)

Sport
- Sport: Freestyle skiing

Priscillia Annen (born 4 June 1992) is a Swiss freestyle skier. She competed in the 2018 Winter Olympics.
