= Alizée Baron =

French freestyle skier

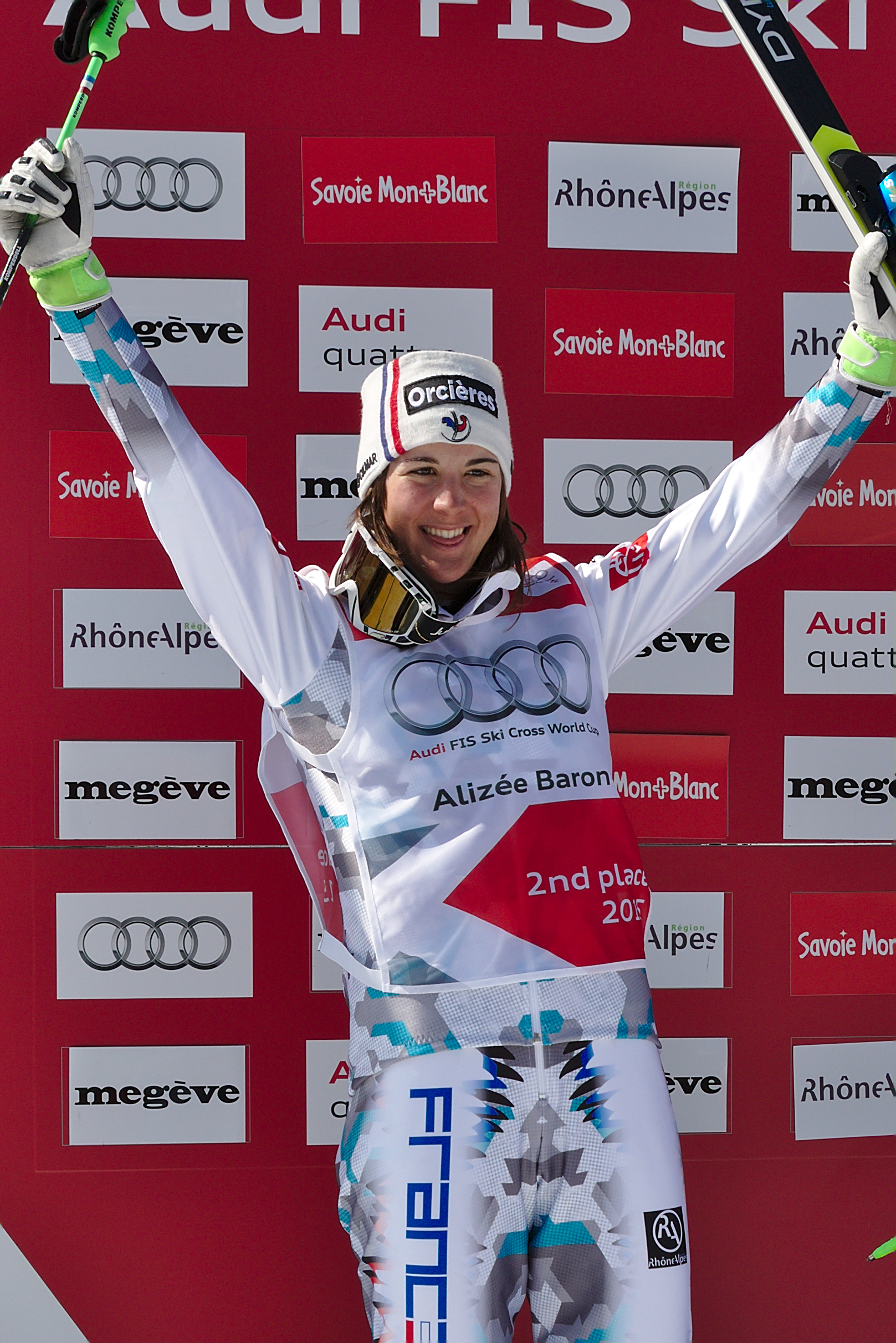
- Baron in 2015

Personal information
- Nationality: French
- Born: 6 August 1992 (age 34) Montpellier, France
- Height: 1.75 m (5 ft 9 in)
- Weight: 64 kg (141 lb)

Sport
- Country: France
- Sport: Freestyle skiing
- Event: Ski cross
- Club: C.S Orcieres Merlette
Medal record
Women's freestyle skiing
Representing France
World Championships
Bronze medal – third place	2019 Utah	Ski cross
Bronze medal – third place	2021 Idre	Ski cross
Winter X Games
Bronze medal – third place	2016 Aspen	Ski cross

Alizée Baron (born 6 August 1992) is a French freestyle skier, specializing in ski cross, and alpine skier.

== Career ==
Baron competed at the 2014 Winter Olympics for France. She finished 19th in the seeding run for the ski cross event. In the first round, she finished third in her heat, failing to advance.

As of September 2015, her best showing at the Freestyle World Championships is 7th, in the 2013 ski cross.

Baron made her Freestyle World Cup debut in December 2011. As of September 2015, she has six World Cup podium finishes, with her best a victory at Åre in 2014–15. Her best Freestyle World Cup overall finish in ski cross is 2nd, in 2014–15.

== World Cup podiums ==
Date	Location	Rank	Event
7 January 2012	St. Johann in Tirol	3rd place, bronze medalist(s)	Ski Cross
15 January 2012	Les Contamines	2nd place, silver medalist(s)	Ski Cross
25 February 2012	Bischofswiesen	3rd place, bronze medalist(s)	Ski Cross
9 January 2015	Val Thorens	3rd place, bronze medalist(s)	Ski Cross
14 February 2015	Åre	1st place, gold medalist(s)	Ski Cross
21 February 2015	Tegernsee	2nd place, silver medalist(s)	Ski Cross
