= Anastasia Chirtsova =

Russian alpine skier (born 1990)

Personal information
- Nationality: Russia
- Born: 17 February 1990 (age 36) Kungur, Russian SSR, Soviet Union (now Russia)

Sport
- Sport: Skiing

Anastasia Stanislavovna Chirtsova (Russian: Анастасия Станиславовна Чирцова, born 17 February 1990) is a Russian freestyle skier, specializing in ski cross and alpine skier.

Chirtsova competed at the 2014 Winter Olympics for Russia. She finished 21st in the seeding run for the ski cross event. In the first round, she did not finish her heat, failing to advance.

As of September 2015, her best showing at the Freestyle World Championships is 18th, in the 2015 ski cross.

Chirtsova made her Freestyle World Cup debut in December 2011. As of September 2015, her best Freestyle World Cup finish is 9th, at Innichen in 2013–14. Her best Freestyle World Cup overall finish in ski cross is 21st, in 2013–14.
