= Christina Ager =

Austrian alpine skier (born 1995)

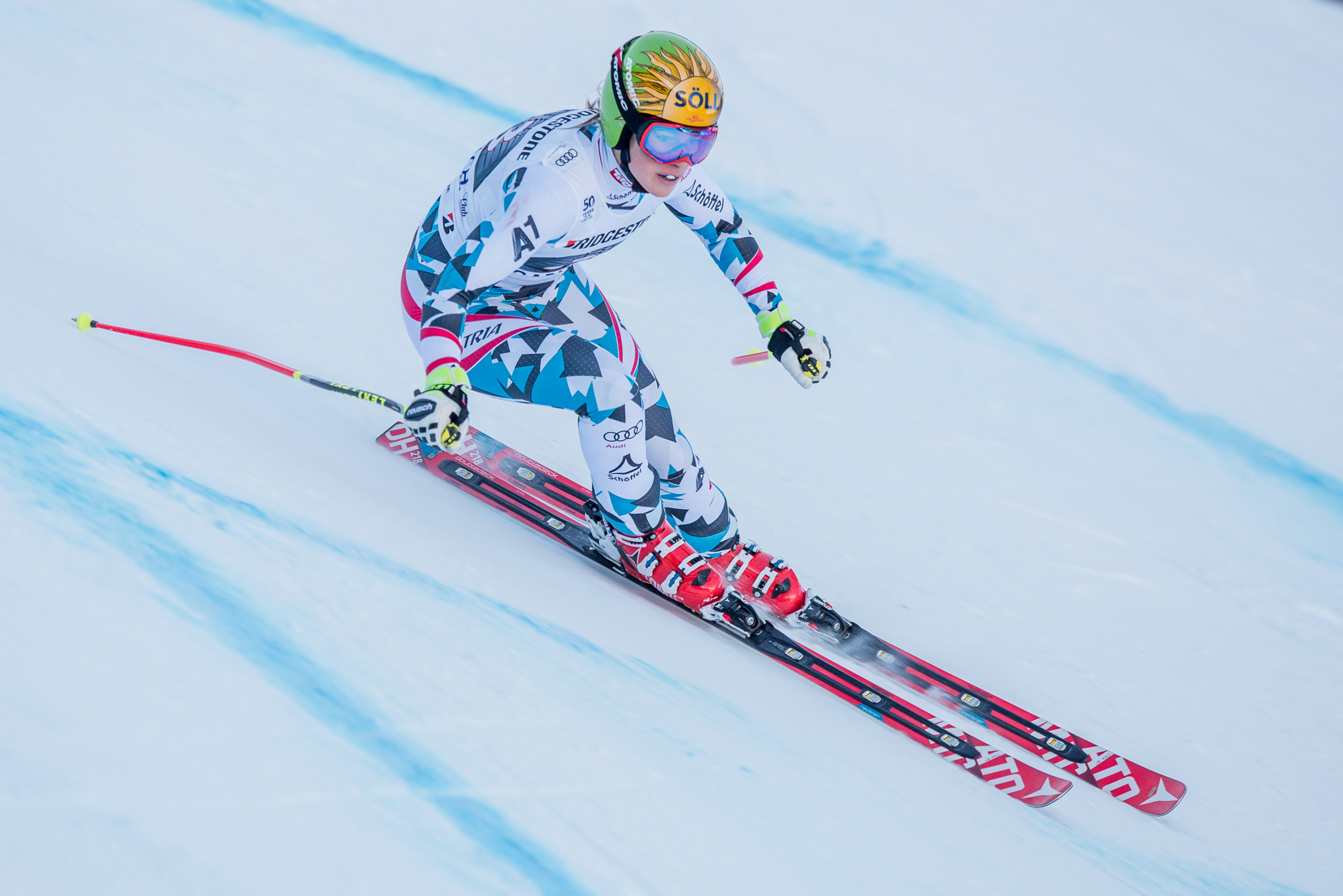
- January 2017

Personal information
- Born: 11 November 1995 (age 30) Innsbruck, Tyrol, Austria

Skiing career
- Sport: Alpine skiing
- Club: WSV Söll
- World Cup debut: 16 November 2013 (age 18)

Olympics
- Teams: 0

World Championships
- Teams: 1 – (2019)
- Medals: 0

World Cup
- Wins: 0
- Podiums: 1
- Overall titles: 0
- Discipline titles: 0

Christina Ager (born 11 November 1995) is an Austrian World Cup alpine ski racer.

== Career ==
Ager won a bronze medal at the 2012 Winter Youth Olympics, two medals at the 2013 European Youth Olympic Winter Festival, and competed at the 2014 and 2015 Junior World Championships where her best placement was fifth in 2015.

She made her World Cup debut in November 2013 in Levi, Finland, shocking the alpine skiing world with a fourth place in the slalom. Competing in all disciplines, Ager made the top 10 again in the 2018–19 season with a 10th place in Val Gardena, 9th place in Cortina d'Ampezzo and lastly a 6th place in the combined in February 2019 in Crans Montana.

She represents the sports club WSV Söll.

== World Cup results ==
=== Season standings ===
Season	Age	Overall	Slalom	Giant slalom	Super-G	Downhill	Combined
2014	18	69	25	—	—	—	—
2015	19	92	38	—	—	—	—
2016	20	—	—	—	—	—	—
2017	21	130	—	—	—	51	20
2019	22	86	—	—	53	44	6
2019	23	49	—	—	30	29	—
2020	24	—	—	—	—	—	—
2021	25	117	—	—	49	—	—N/a
2022	26	—	—	—	—	—	—N/a
2023	27	55	—	—	37	25	—N/a
2024	28	36	—	—	24	18	—N/a

=== Race podiums ===
- 0 wins
- 1 podium (1 DH); 7 top tens

Season	Date	Location	Discipline	Place
2024	26 January 2024	Cortina d'Ampezzo, Italy	Downhill	3rd

== World Championship results ==
Year	Age	Slalom	Giant slalom	Super-G	Downhill	Combined	Parallel	Team event
2019	23	—	—	DNF	—	17	—	—
