= Valérie Grenier =

Canadian alpine skier (born 1996)

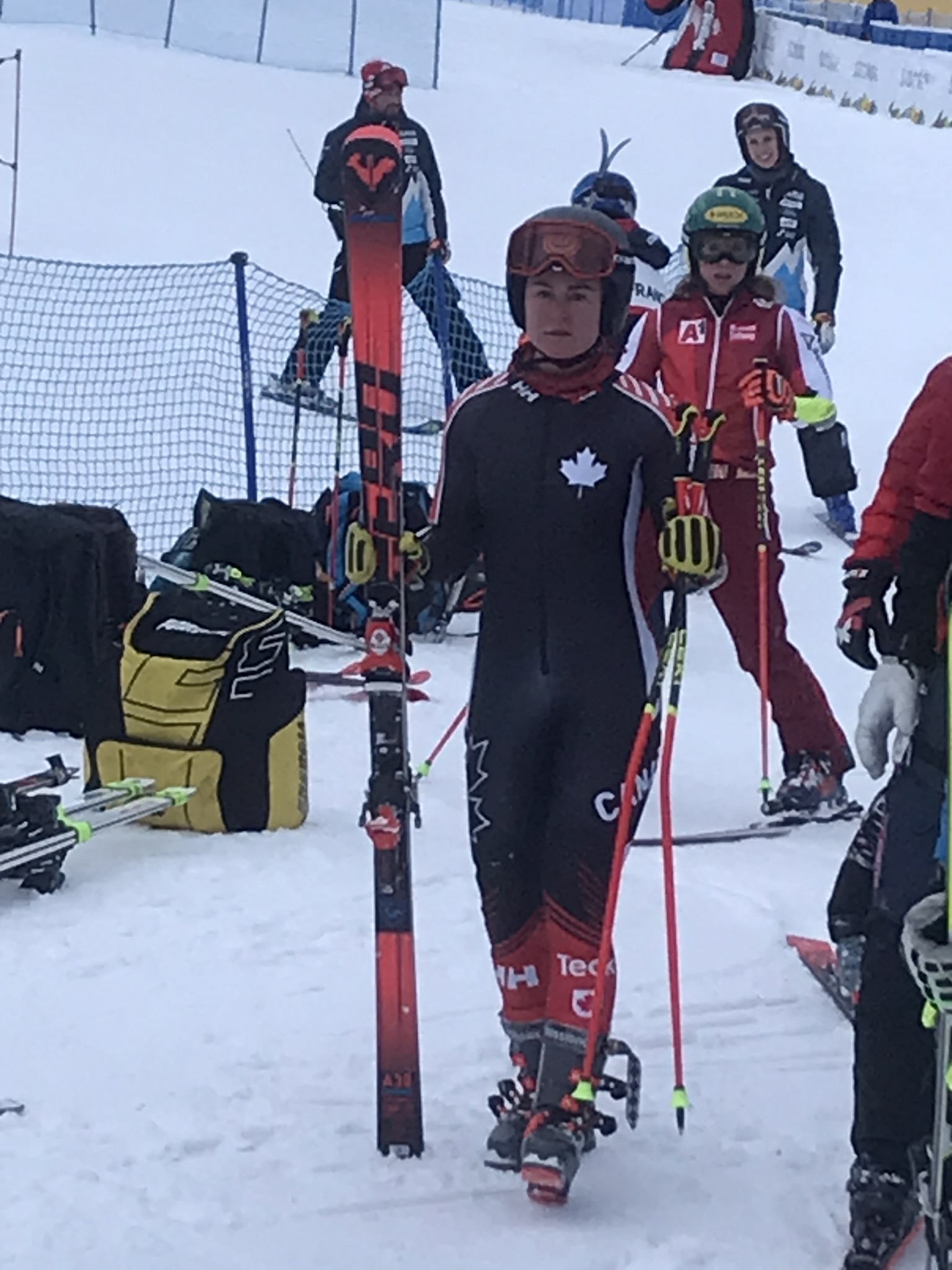
- At San Vigilio di Marebbe in 2023

Personal information
- Born: October 30, 1996 (age 29) Ottawa, Ontario, Canada
- Height: 1.69 m (5 ft 7 in)
- Website: valeriegrenier.com

Skiing career
- Country: Canada
- Sport: Alpine skiing
- Club: Mont-Tremblant
- Disciplines: Giant slalom, super-G, downhill
- World Cup debut: December 7, 2014 (age 18)

Olympics
- Teams: 3 – (2018, 2022, 2026)
- Medals: 0

World Championships
- Teams: 6 – (2015–2025)
- Medals: 1 (0 gold)

World Cup
- Seasons: 11 – (2015–2019, 2021–2026)
- Wins: 3 – (3 GS)
- Podiums: 6 – (5 GS, 1 DH)
- Overall titles: 0 – (19th in 2024)
- Discipline titles: 0 – (6th in GS, 2024)
Medal record
Women's alpine skiing
Representing Canada
World Championships
Bronze medal – third place	2023 Méribel	Team event
Junior World Championships
Gold medal – first place	2016 Sochi	Downhill
Silver medal – second place	2016 Sochi	Super-G
Bronze medal – third place	2015 Hafjell	Super-G

Valérie Grenier (French pronunciation: [valeʁi ɡʁənje]; born October 30, 1996) is a Canadian World Cup alpine ski racer. She started skiing in all disciplines and later specialized in giant slalom and super-G, with some occasional starts in downhill.

From St. Isidore, Ontario, between Ottawa and Montreal, Grenier has competed at five World Championships and two Winter Olympics. At the Junior World Championships in 2016, she won the gold medal in downhill and took silver in the Super-G. In January 2022, she was named to Canada's 2022 Olympic team.

Grenier attained her first World Cup podium in 2023, a victory on January 7 at a giant slalom in Kranjska Gora, posting the best result in both runs. It was the first World Cup GS win by a Canadian in 49 years, since Kathy Kreiner won in early 1974 at Pfronten, West Germany. A year later, she defended the Golden Fox title, winning at the same venue once again.

== World Cup results ==
=== Season standings ===
Season
Season	Age	Overall	Slalom	Giant slalom	Super-G	Downhill	Combined
2015	18	91	—	—	35	—	—
2016	19	98	—	—	40	—	—
2017	20	76	60	40	34	41	—
2018	21	100	—	56	51	—	28
2019	22	51	—	28	18	—	—
2020	23	did not compete					
2021	24	66	—	24	—	—	—N/a
2022	25	49	—	12	—	—	—N/a
2023	26	25	—	7	36	—	—N/a
2024	27	19	—	6	31	25	—N/a
2025	28	34	—	12	30	38	—N/a
2026	29	22	—	7	25	43	—N/a

=== Race podiums ===
- 3 wins (3 GS)
- 6 podiums (5 GS, 1 DH); 28 top tens (24 GS, 3 SG, 1 DH)

Season
Season	Date	Location	Discipline	Place
2023	7 January 2023	Kranjska Gora, Slovenia	Giant slalom	1st
2023	19 March 2023	Soldeu, Andorra	Giant slalom	3rd
2024	6 January 2024	Kranjska Gora, Slovenia	Giant slalom	1st
2024	26 January 2024	Cortina d'Ampezzo, Italy	Downhill	3rd
2026	6 December 2025	Tremblant, Canada	Giant slalom	3rd
2026	25 March 2026	Hafjell, Norway	Giant slalom	1st

== World Championship results ==
Year
Year	Age	Slalom	Giant slalom	Super-G	Downhill	Combined	Team combined	Parallel	Team event
2015	18	—	—	19	DNF	DNF1	—N/a	—N/a	—
2017	20	—	DNS2	33	32	11	—N/a	—N/a	—
2019	22	—	—	19	—	—	—N/a	—N/a	—
2021	24	—	DNF1	DNF	—	DNF2	—N/a	—	—
2023	26	—	20	DNF	—	14	—N/a	—	3
2025	28	—	14	DNF	—	—N/a	—	—N/a	—

== Olympic results ==
Year
Year	Age	Slalom	Giant slalom	Super-G	Downhill	Combined	Team combined	Team event
2018	21	—	DNF2	23	21	6	—N/a	—
2022	25	—	DNF1	—	—	—	—N/a	—
2026	29	—	13	DNF	DSQ	—N/a	13	—N/a
