= Mina Fürst Holtmann =

Norwegian alpine skier (born 1995)

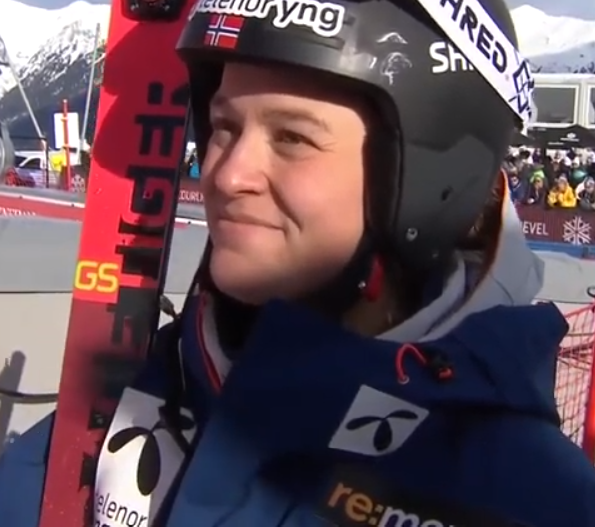
- First podium in December 2019

Personal information
- Born: 17 July 1995 (age 31) Målselv, Norway

Skiing career
- Country: Norway
- Sport: Alpine skiing
- Club: Bærums SK
- Disciplines: Slalom, Giant slalom
- World Cup debut: 24 January 2015 (age 19)

Olympics
- Teams: 2 – (2022, 2026)
- Medals: 1 (0 gold)

World Championships
- Teams: 4 – (2019–2025)
- Medals: 0

World Cup
- Seasons: 10 – (2015, 2018–2026)
- Wins: 0
- Podiums: 4 – (2 GS, 2 SL)
- Overall titles: 0 – (20th in 2020)
- Discipline titles: 0 – (7th in GS, 2020)
Medal record
Women's alpine skiing
Representing Norway
Olympic Games
Bronze medal – third place	2022 Beijing	Team event
Junior World Championships
Gold medal – first place	2015 Hafjell	Downhill
Silver medal – second place	2015 Hafjell	Super-G
Bronze medal – third place	2015 Hafjell	Combined

Mina Fürst Holtmann (born 17 July 1995) is a Norwegian World Cup alpine ski racer and specializes in the technical events of slalom and giant slalom. She represents the sports club Bærums SK.

== Career ==
Fürst Holtmann competed without finishing at the 2012 Winter Youth Olympics, later competed at the Junior World Championships in 2014, and the following year she won three medals (bronze, silver, and gold). She made her World Cup debut in January 2015 in St. Moritz, where she also collected her first World Cup points with a 29th-place finish on the second race day.

Following a lengthy injury, Fürst Holtmann returned to the World Cup circuit in October 2017, and recorded her first top-15 finish with a 13th place in Levi that November. Her first World Cup podium was in December 2019, with a runner-up in a giant slalom at Courchevel, France.

== World Cup results ==
=== Season standings ===
Season
Season	Age	Overall	Slalom	Giant slalom	Super-G	Downhill	Combined	Parallel
2015	19	121	—	—	56	—	—	—N/a
2016	20	did not compete						—N/a
2017	21	did not compete						—N/a
2018	22	89	43	37	—	—	—	—N/a
2019	23	43	21	22	—	—	—	—N/a
2020	24	20	16	7	—	—	—	—
2021	25	38	24	16	—	—	—N/a	—
2022	26	30	13	19	—	—	—N/a	—
2023	27	33	21	16	—	—	—N/a	—N/a
2024	28	24	16	17	—	—	—N/a	—N/a
2025	29	28	15	16	—	—	—N/a	—N/a
2026	30	37	44	14	—	—	—N/a	—N/a

=== Race podiums ===
- 0 wins
- 4 podiums – (2 GS, 2 SL), 30 top tens

Season
Season	Date	Location	Discipline	Place
2020	17 December 2019	Courchevel, France	Giant slalom	2nd
2022	12 March 2022	Åre, Sweden	Slalom	2nd
2024	16 March 2024	Saalbach, Austria	Slalom	2nd
2026	25 March 2026	Hafjell, Norway	Giant slalom	2nd

== World Championship results ==
Year
Year	Age	Slalom	Giant slalom	Super-G	Downhill	Combined	Team combined
2019	23	DNF1	—	—	—	—	—N/a
2021	25	DNF2	22	—	—	—	—N/a
2023	27	4	6	—	—	—	—N/a
2025	29	DNF2	17	—	—	—N/a	DNF

== Olympic results ==
Year
Year	Age	Slalom	Giant slalom	Super-G	Downhill	Combined	Team combined	Team event
2022	26	DNF2	DNF1	—	—	—	—N/a	3
2026	30	17	6	—	—	—N/a	—	—N/a
