= Paula Moltzan =

American alpine skier (born 1994)

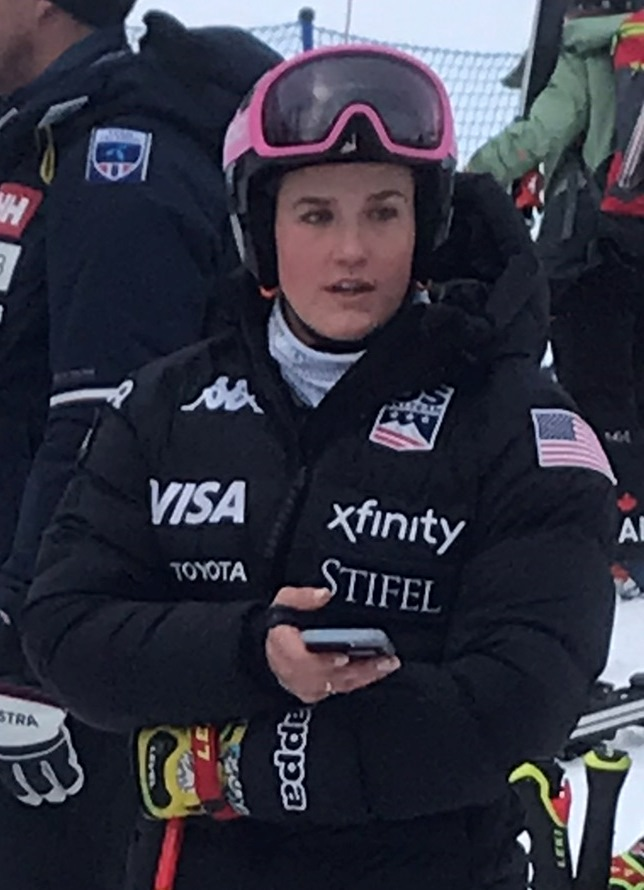
- Moltzan in 2023

Personal information
- Born: April 7, 1994 (age 32) Lakeville, Minnesota, U.S.

Skiing career
- Country: United States
- Sport: Alpine skiing ♀
- Club: University of Vermont
- Disciplines: Slalom, Giant slalom
- World Cup debut: November 25, 2012 (age 18)

Olympics
- Teams: 2 – (2022, 2026)
- Medals: 1 (0 gold)

World Championships
- Teams: 5 – (2015, 2019–2025)
- Medals: 2 (1 gold)

World Cup
- Seasons: 14 – (2013–2016, 2018–2027)
- Wins: 1 – 1 GS
- Podiums: 11 – (6 GS, 4 SL, 1 PG)
- Overall titles: 0 – (6th in 2026)
- Discipline titles: 0 – (2nd in PAR, 2021)
Medal record
Women's alpine skiing
Representing the United States
Olympic Games
Bronze medal – third place	2026 Milano Cortina	Team combined
World Championships
Gold medal – first place	2023 Méribel	Team event
Bronze medal – third place	2025 Saalbach	Giant slalom
World Junior Championships
Gold medal – first place	2015 Hafjell	Slalom

Paula Moltzan (born April 7, 1994) is an American World Cup alpine ski racer and specializes in slalom and giant slalom.

== Biography ==
Born to Robyn and Mark Moltzan and from Minnesota, Moltzan began racing at Buck Hill, south of Minneapolis. She competed at the World Championships in 2015 at Beaver Creek, finishing twentieth in the slalom. A month later she won gold in the slalom at the Junior World Championships at Hafjell, Norway.

Moltzan raced collegiately for the University of Vermont in Burlington and won the NCAA title in slalom in 2017 at Cannon Mountain, New Hampshire. She rejoined the World Cup circuit for the 2018–19 season and finished eighteenth in slalom at the World Championships in 2019.

At the 2022 Winter Olympics, Moltzan was eighth in the slalom, twelfth in the giant slalom, and fourth in the team event.

Her biggest influences are her cousin Allen and her uncle Scott.

At the 2025 World Championships in Saalbach-Hinterglemm, Austria, Moltzan placed fourth in three events (team event, team combined, slalom), and grabbed a bronze medal in the giant slalom, her first individual medal at a major event.

At the 2026 Winter Olympics, Moltzan won a bronze medal skiing the slalom portion of the team combined with Jacqueline Wiles skiing the downhill. She also placed eighth in the slalom and fifteenth in the giant slalom.

Moltzan took her first world cup victory in the Giant Slalom in Sölden, Austria on October 24, 2026.

== World Cup results ==
=== Season standings ===
Season
Season	Age	Overall	Slalom	Giant slalom	Super-G	Downhill	Combined	Parallel
2015	20	No World Cup points						—N/a
2016	21	118	54	—	—	—	—	—N/a
2017	22	Collegiate racing						—N/a
2018	23	Collegiate racing						—N/a
2019	24	70	27	—	—	—	—	—N/a
2020	25	102	37	—	—	—	—	—
2021	26	21	11	27	—	—	—N/a	2nd place, silver medalist(s)
2022	27	39	19	22	—	—	—N/a	—
2023	28	15	7	11	—	—	—N/a	—N/a
2024	29	17	12	11	—	—	—N/a	—N/a
2025	30	12	11	7	—	—	—N/a	—N/a
2026	31	6	5	6	—	—	—N/a	—N/a
2027	32	1	—	1	—	—	—N/a	—N/a

Standings through October 25, 2026

=== Race podiums ===
- 1 win – (1 GS)
- 11 podiums – (6 GS, 4 SL, 1 PG), 54 top tens

Season
Season	Date	Location	Discipline	Place
2021	November 26, 2020	Lech/Zürs, Austria	Parallel-G	2nd
2023	December 29, 2022	Semmering, Austria	Slalom	2nd
2024	February 11, 2024	Soldeu, Andorra	Slalom	3rd
2025	January 21, 2025	Kronplatz, Italy	Giant slalom	3rd
2025	February 23, 2025	Sestriere, Italy	Slalom	3rd
2026	October 25, 2025	Sölden, Austria	Giant slalom	2nd
2026	January 3, 2026	Kranjska Gora, Slovenia	Giant slalom	3rd
2026	January 13, 2026	Flachau, Austria	Slalom	2nd
2026	January 24, 2026	(Czech Republic) Špindlerův Mlýn, Czech Republic	Giant slalom	2nd
2026	March 14, 2026	Åre, Sweden	Giant slalom	2nd
2027	October 24, 2026	Sölden, Austria	Giant slalom	1st

== World Championship results ==
Year
Year	Age	Slalom	Giant slalom	Super-G	Downhill	Combined	Team combined	Parallel	Team event
2015	20	20	—	—	—	—	—N/a	—N/a	—
2019	24	18	DNS2	—	—	—	—N/a	—N/a	—
2021	26	DNF1	DNF1	—	—	—	—N/a	4	6
2023	28	—	DNF1	—	—	—	—N/a	—	1
2025	30	4	3	—	—	—N/a	4	—N/a	4

== Olympic results ==
Year
Year	Age	Slalom	Giant slalom	Super-G	Downhill	Combined	Team combined	Team event
2022	27	8	12	—	—	—	—N/a	4
2026	31	8	15	—	—	—N/a	3	—N/a
