= Stephanie Venier =

Austrian alpine skier (born 1993)

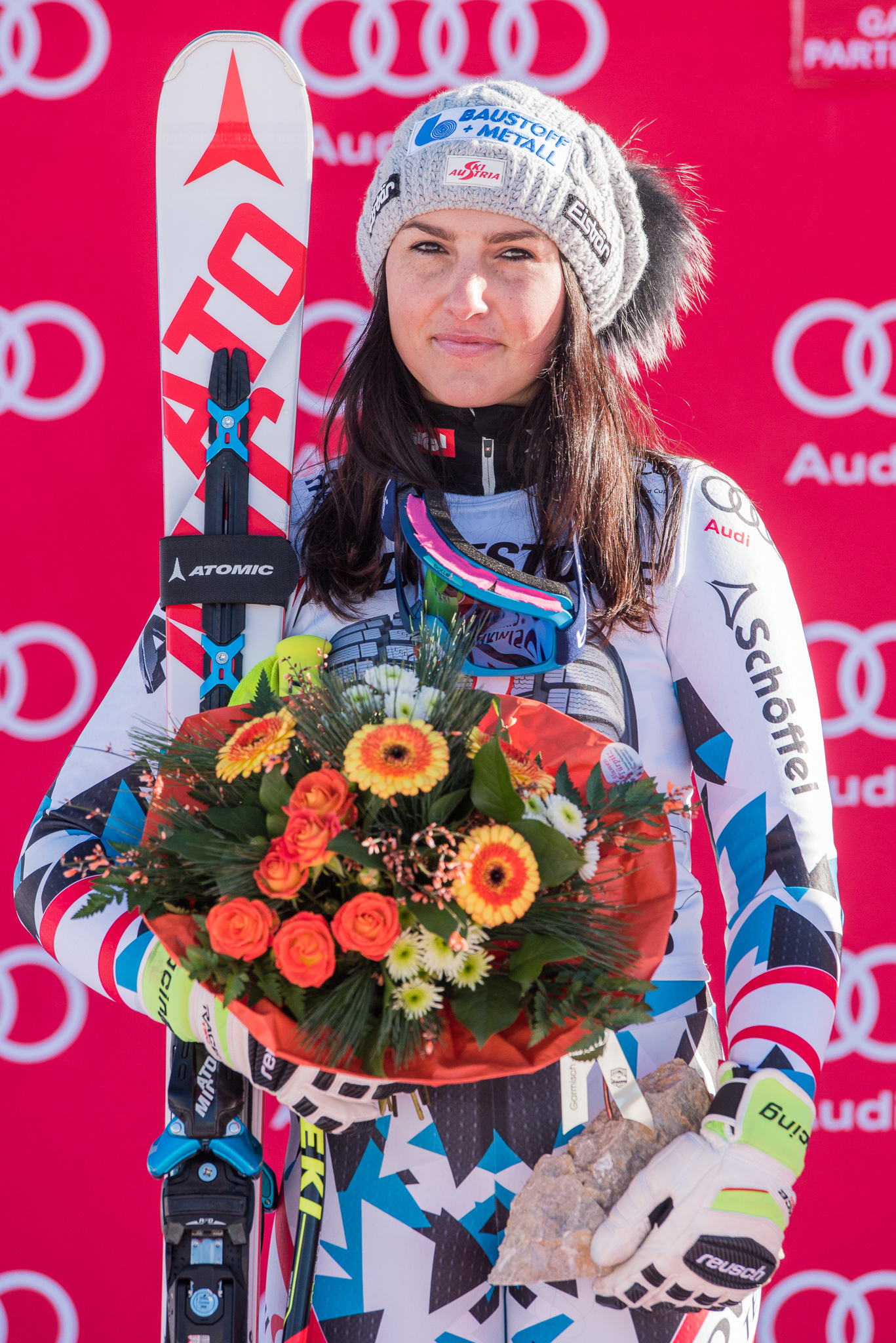
- First podium in January 2017

Personal information
- Born: 19 December 1993 (age 32) Innsbruck, Tyrol, Austria
- Height: 168 cm (5 ft 6 in)

Skiing career
- Sport: Alpine skiing ♀
- Club: SV Oberperfuss - Tirol
- Disciplines: Downhill, Super-G, Combined
- World Cup debut: 12 January 2013 (age 19)

Olympics
- Teams: 1 – (2018)
- Medals: 0

World Championships
- Teams: 5 – (2017–2025)
- Medals: 3 (1 gold)

World Cup
- Seasons: 13 – (2013–2025)
- Wins: 3 – (2 DH, 1 SG)
- Podiums: 12 – (6 DH, 6 SG)
- Overall titles: 0 – (9th in 2019)
- Discipline titles: 0 – (2nd in DH, 2019)
Medal record
Women's alpine skiing
Representing Austria
World Championships
Gold medal – first place	2025 Saalbach	Super-G
Silver medal – second place	2017 St. Moritz	Downhill
Bronze medal – third place	2025 Saalbach	Team combined
Junior World Championships
Gold medal – first place	2013 Le Massif	Super-G
Silver medal – second place	2013 Le Massif	Downhill
Silver medal – second place	2014 Jasná	Super-G

Stephanie Venier (born 19 December 1993) is an Austrian former World Cup alpine ski racer, who specialised in the speed events of downhill and super-G.

Born in Innsbruck, Tyrol, Venier made her World Cup debut at age 19 in January 2013. She gained her first podium in January 2017 in a super-G at Garmisch-Partenkirchen, Germany; several weeks later at the World Championships, she won the silver medal in the downhill.

At the 2025 World Championships in Saalbach-Hinterglemm, she won the gold medal in the Super-G. Venier also won bronze in the team combined, alongside Katharina Truppe.

== World Cup results ==
=== Season standings ===
Season	Age	Overall	Slalom	Giant slalom	Super-G	Downhill	Combined
2013	19	117	—	—	49	—	—
2014	20	98	—	—	42	—	27
2015	21	101	—	—	46	42	—
2016	22	46	—	—	17	30	39
2017	23	16	—	—	5	12	28
2018	24	27	—	—	19	13	29
2019	25	9	—	—	9	2	—
2020	26	14	—	—	5	7	—
2021	27	44	—	—	22	21	—N/a
2022	28	46	—	—	35	22	—N/a
2023	29	32	—	—	14	22	—N/a
2024	30	10	—	—	4	4	—N/a
2025	31	24	—	—	9	11	—N/a

Standings through 24 February 2025

=== Race podiums ===
- 3 wins – (2 DH, 1 SG)
- 12 podiums – (6 DH, 6 SG); 52 top tens

Season	Date	Location	Discipline	Place
2017	22 January 2017	Garmisch-Partenkirchen, Germany	Super-G	2nd
2017	25 February 2017	Crans-Montana, Switzerland	Super-G	3rd
2019	18 January 2019	Cortina d'Ampezzo, Italy	Downhill	3rd
2019	27 January 2019	Garmisch-Partenkirchen, Germany	Downhill	1st
2020	6 December 2019	Lake Louise, Canada	Downhill	3rd
2020	21 February 2020	Crans-Montana, Switzerland	Downhill	3rd
2023	5 March 2023	Kvitfjell, Norway	Super-G	2nd
2024	13 January 2024	Altenmarkt-Zauchensee, Austria	Downhill	2nd
2024	26 January 2024	Cortina d'Ampezzo, Italy	Downhill	1st
2024	28 January 2024	Cortina d'Ampezzo, Italy	Super-G	2nd
2024	18 February 2024	Crans-Montana, Switzerland	Super-G	1st
2025	12 January 2025	St. Anton, Austria	Super-G	2nd

== World Championship results ==
Year	Age	Slalom	Giant slalom	Super-G	Downhill	Combined	Team Combined
2017	23	—	—	7	2	17	—N/a
2019	25	—	—	DNF	4	—	—N/a
2021	27	—	—	20	—	—	—N/a
2023	29	—	—	—	7	—	—N/a
2025	31	—	—	1	9	—N/a	3

== Olympic results ==
Year	Age	Slalom	Giant slalom	Super-G	Downhill	Combined
2018	24	—	—	—	DNF	DNS1
