= Katharina Liensberger =

Austrian alpine skier (born 1997)

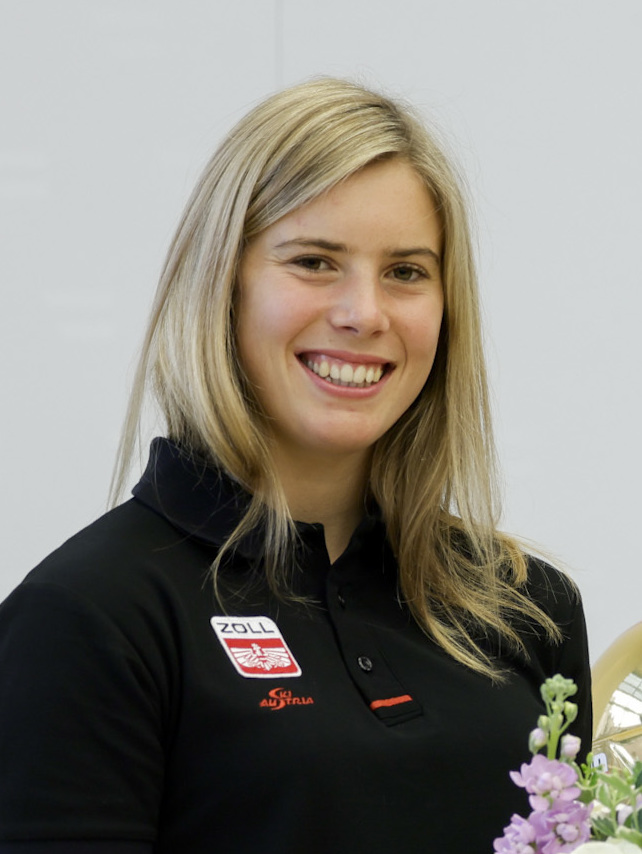
- Liensberger in May 2021

Personal information
- Born: 1 April 1997 (age 29) Feldkirch, Vorarlberg, Austria
- Height: 1.64 m (5 ft 5 in)
- Website: katharina-liensberger.at

Skiing career
- Country: Austria
- Sport: Alpine skiing
- Club: SK Rankweil
- Disciplines: Slalom, giant slalom
- World Cup debut: 12 January 2016 (age 18)

Olympics
- Teams: 2 – (2018, 2022)
- Medals: 3 (1 gold)

World Championships
- Teams: 4 − (2019–2025)
- Medals: 5 (2 gold)

World Cup
- Seasons: 11 − (2016–2026)
- Wins: 3 − (3 SL)
- Podiums: 18 − (17 SL, 1 GS)
- Overall titles: 0 − (5th in 2021)
- Discipline titles: 1 − (SL – 2021)
Medal record
Women's alpine skiing
Representing Austria
International alpine ski competitions
Event	1st	2nd	3rd
Olympic Games	1	2	0
World Championships	2	1	2
Total	3	3	2
World Cup race podiums
Event	1st	2nd	3rd
Slalom	3	6	6
Giant slalom	0	0	1
Total	3	6	7
Olympic Games
Gold medal – first place	2022 Beijing	Team event
Silver medal – second place	2018 Pyeongchang	Team event
Silver medal – second place	2022 Beijing	Slalom
World Championships
Gold medal – first place	2021 Cortina d'Ampezzo	Parallel
Gold medal – first place	2021 Cortina d'Ampezzo	Slalom
Silver medal – second place	2019 Åre	Team event
Bronze medal – third place	2021 Cortina d'Ampezzo	Giant slalom
Bronze medal – third place	2025 Saalbach	Slalom
Junior World Championships
Silver medal – second place	2017 Åre	Giant slalom
Silver medal – second place	2017 Åre	Team event
Silver medal – second place	2018 Davos	Giant slalom

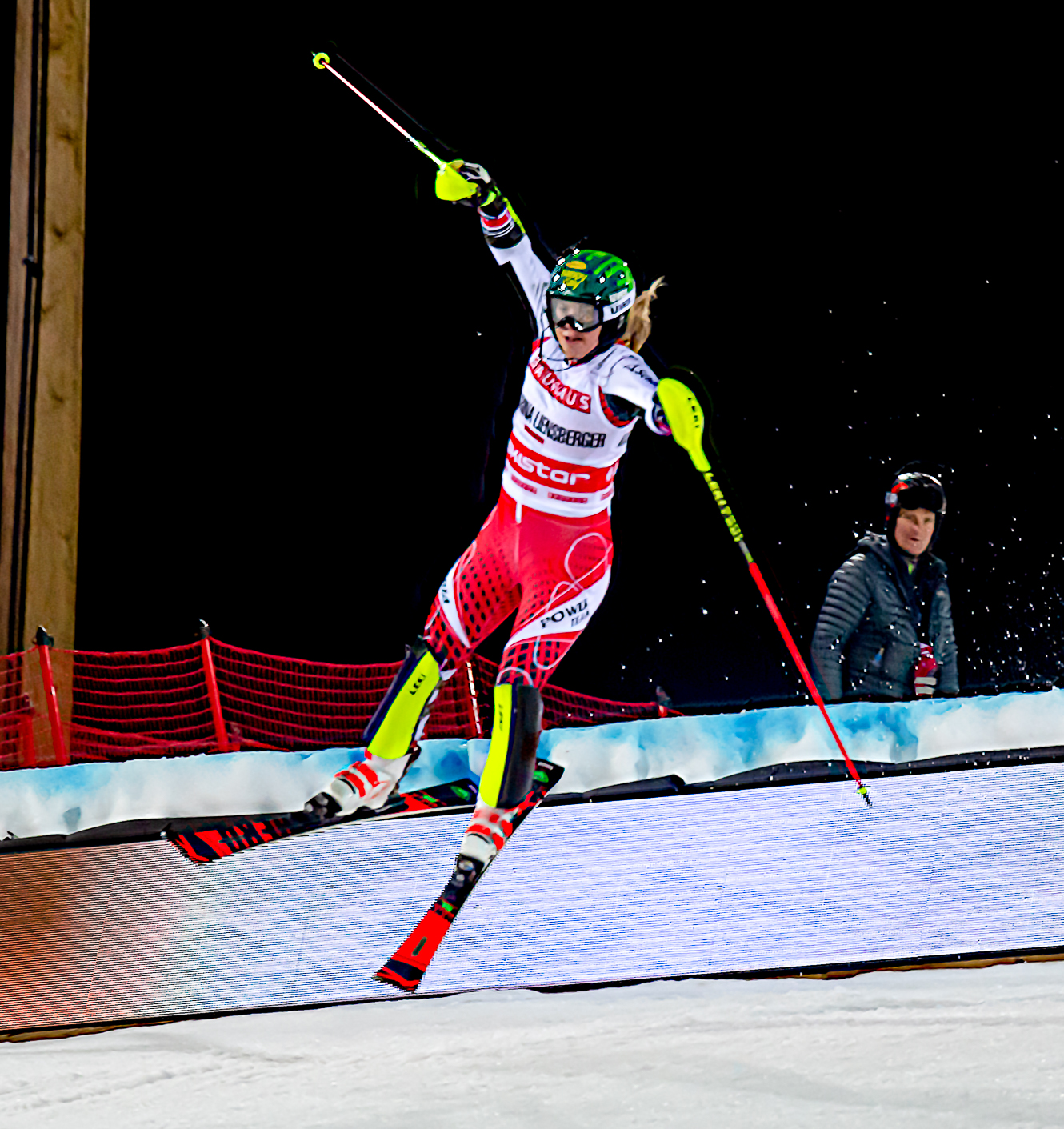
Liensberger in Stockholm, February 2019

Katharina Liensberger (born 1 April 1997) is an Austrian World Cup alpine ski racer, and specialises in the technical events of slalom and giant slalom.

Born in Feldkirch, Vorarlberg, Liensberger made her World Cup debut in January 2016 and gained her first podium in 2019; her first World Cup victories came in March 2021 and won the season title in slalom. A month earlier, she became the world champion in the slalom and parallel giant slalom.

== World Cup results ==
=== Season titles ===
- 1 title (1 Slalom)

Season	Discipline
2021	Slalom

=== Season standings ===
Season
Season	Age	Overall	Slalom	Giant slalom	Super-G	Downhill	Combined	Parallel
2017	19	106	44	—	—	—	—	—N/a
2018	20	36	14	34	—	—	—	—N/a
2019	21	12	7	12	—	—	—	—N/a
2020	22	16	3rd place, bronze medalist(s)	13	—	—	—	26
2021	23	5	1st place, gold medalist(s)	10	—	—	—N/a	16
2022	24	15	4	21	—	—	—N/a	16
2023	25	39	19	20	—	—	—N/a	—N/a
2024	26	18	7	21	—	—	—N/a	—N/a
2025	27	11	2nd place, silver medalist(s)	29	—	—	—N/a	—N/a
2026	28	39	18	28	—	—	—N/a	—N/a

=== Race podiums ===
- 3 wins – (3 SL)
- 18 podiums – (17 SL, 1 GS); 69 top tens

Season
Season	Date	Location	Discipline	Place
2019	8 January 2019	Flachau, Austria	Slalom	3rd
2020	29 December 2019	Lienz, Austria	Giant slalom	3rd
2020	4 January 2020	Zagreb, Croatia	Slalom	3rd
2021	21 November 2020	Levi, Finland	Slalom	3rd
2021	22 November 2020	Levi, Finland	Slalom	3rd
2021	29 December 2020	Semmering, Austria	Slalom	2nd
2021	3 January 2021	Zagreb, Croatia	Slalom	2nd
2021	12 January 2021	Flachau, Austria	Slalom	2nd
2021	12 March 2021	Åre, Sweden	Slalom	2nd
2021	13 March 2021	Åre, Sweden	Slalom	1st
2021	20 March 2021	Lenzerheide, Switzerland	Slalom	1st
2022	29 December 2021	Lienz, Austria	Slalom	2nd
2022	4 January 2022	Zagreb, Croatia	Slalom	3rd
2022	12 March 2022	Åre, Sweden	Slalom	1st
2024	11 November 2023	Levi, Finland	Slalom	3rd
2025	16 November 2024	Levi, Finland	Slalom	2nd
2025	29 December 2024	Semmering, Austria	Slalom	3rd
2025	9 March 2025	Åre, Sweden	Slalom	2nd

== World Championship results ==
Year
Year	Age	Slalom	Giant slalom	Super-G	Downhill	Combined	Team combined	Parallel	Team event
2019	21	4	12	—	—	—	—N/a	—N/a	2
2021	23	1	3	—	—	—	—N/a	1	5
2023	25	20	24	—	—	—	—N/a	—	—
2025	27	3	12	—	—	—N/a	5	—N/a	—

== Olympic results ==
Year
Year	Age	Slalom	Giant slalom	Super-G	Downhill	Combined	Team event
2018	20	8	—	—	—	—	2
2022	24	2	15	—	—	—	1
