= Katharina Truppe =

Austrian alpine skier (born 1996)

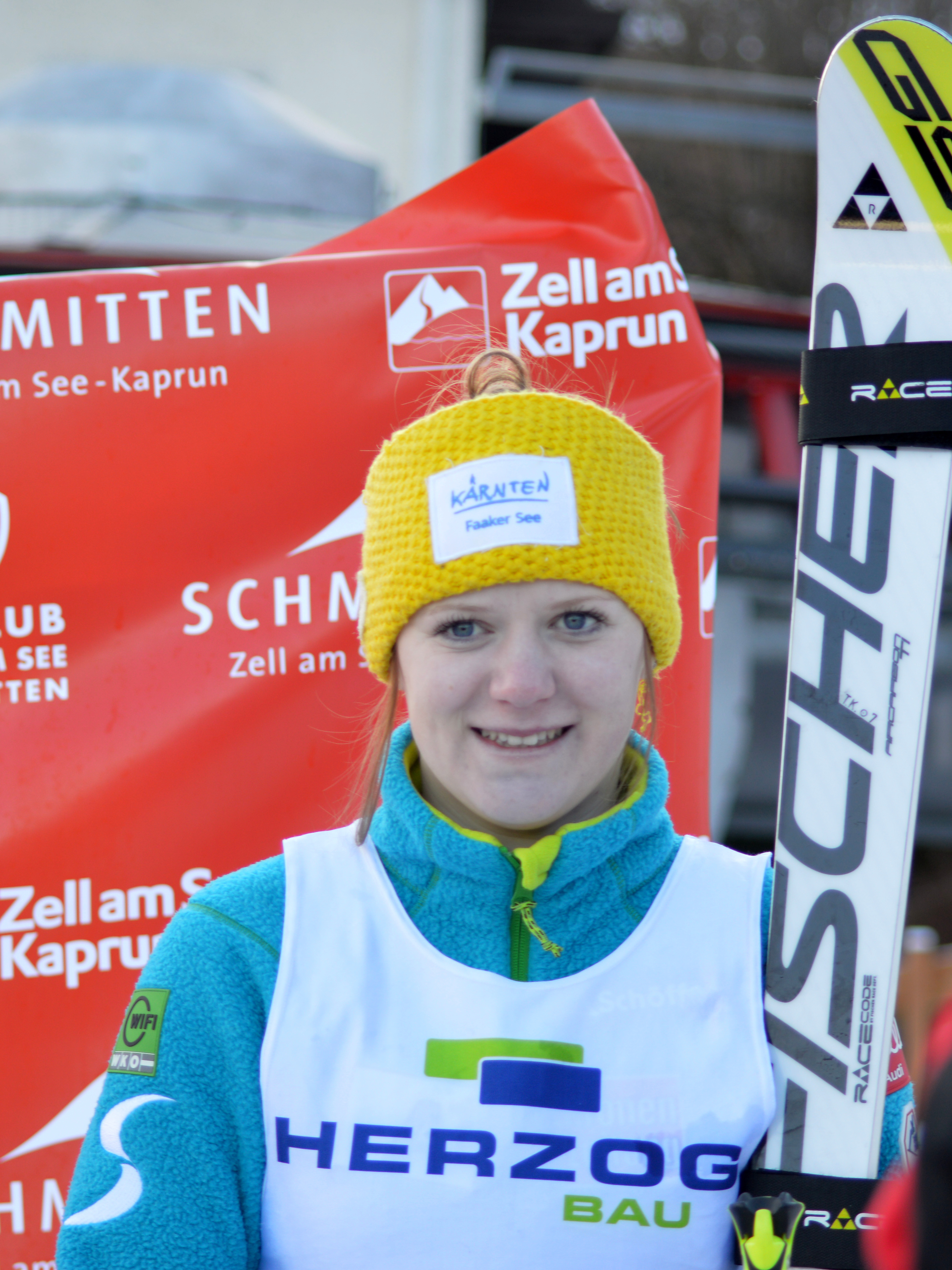
- Truppe in 2015

Personal information
- Full name: Katharina Truppe
- Born: 15 January 1996 (age 30) Villach, Carinthia, Austria
- Height: 1.62 m (5 ft 4 in)
- Website: kathitruppe.at

Skiing career
- Country: Austria
- Sport: Alpine skiing
- Club: ASKOE ESV St. Veit
- Disciplines: Slalom, Giant slalom
- World Cup debut: 13 January 2015 (age 18)

Olympics
- Teams: 2 − (2022, 2026)
- Medals: 1 (1 gold)

World Championships
- Teams: 4 − (2017–2025)
- Medals: 2 (0 gold)

World Cup
- Seasons: 12 – (2015–2026)
- Wins: 1 – (1 SL)
- Podiums: 7 − (7 SL)
- Overall titles: 0 − (13th in 2019)
- Discipline titles: 0 − (4th in SL, 2026)
Medal record
Women's alpine skiing
Representing Austria
Olympic Games
Gold medal – first place	2022 Beijing	Team event
World Championships
Silver medal – second place	2019 Åre	Team event
Bronze medal – third place	2025 Saalbach	Team combined
Junior World Championships
Bronze medal – third place	2015 Hafjell	Slalom

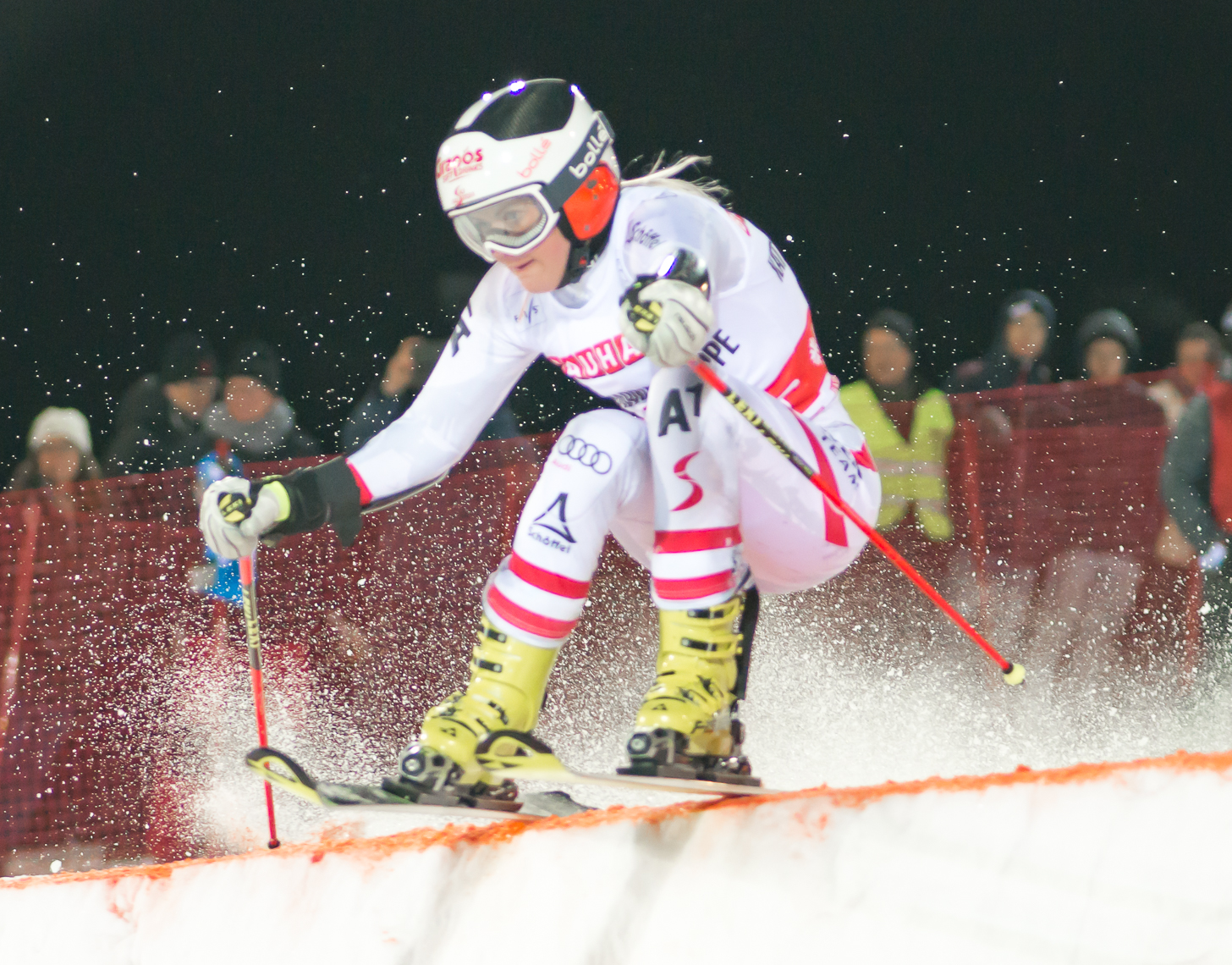
Katharina Truppe in Hammarbybacken World Cup 2018

Katharina Truppe (born 15 January 1996) is an Austrian World Cup alpine ski racer. Born in Villach, Carinthia, she specializes in the technical events of slalom and giant slalom. Truppe made her World Cup debut in January 2015, and ascended her first podium in November 2019 at Levi, Finland.

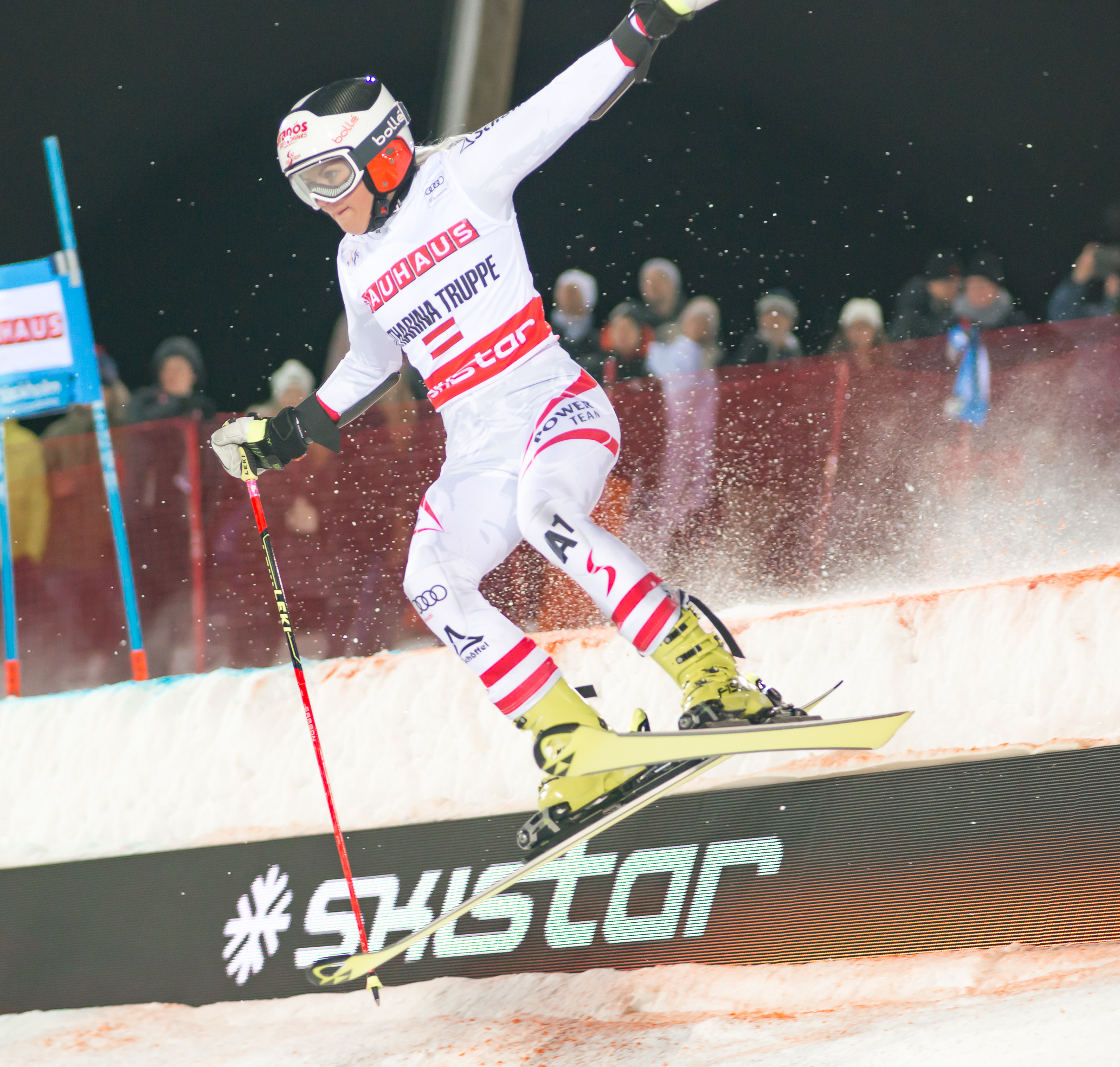
Katharina Truppe in Hammarbybacken World Cup 2018

== World Cup results ==
=== Season standings ===
Season
Season	Age	Overall	Slalom	Giant slalom	Super-G	Downhill	Combined	Parallel
2016	20	59	23	34	—	—	—	—N/a
2017	21	34	13	24	—	—	—	—N/a
2018	22	35	12	39	—	—	—	—N/a
2019	23	13	6	21	—	—	—	—N/a
2020	24	22	7	22	—	—	—	22
2021	25	28	12	20	—	—	—N/a	13
2022	26	20	9	10	—	—	—N/a	20
2023	27	34	11	34	—	—	—N/a	—N/a
2024	28	41	13	43	—	—	—N/a	—N/a
2025	29	38	13	—	—	—	—N/a	—N/a
2026	30	19	4	—	—	—	—N/a	—N/a
2027	31	7	3	—	—	—	—N/a	—N/a

Standings through 15 November 2026

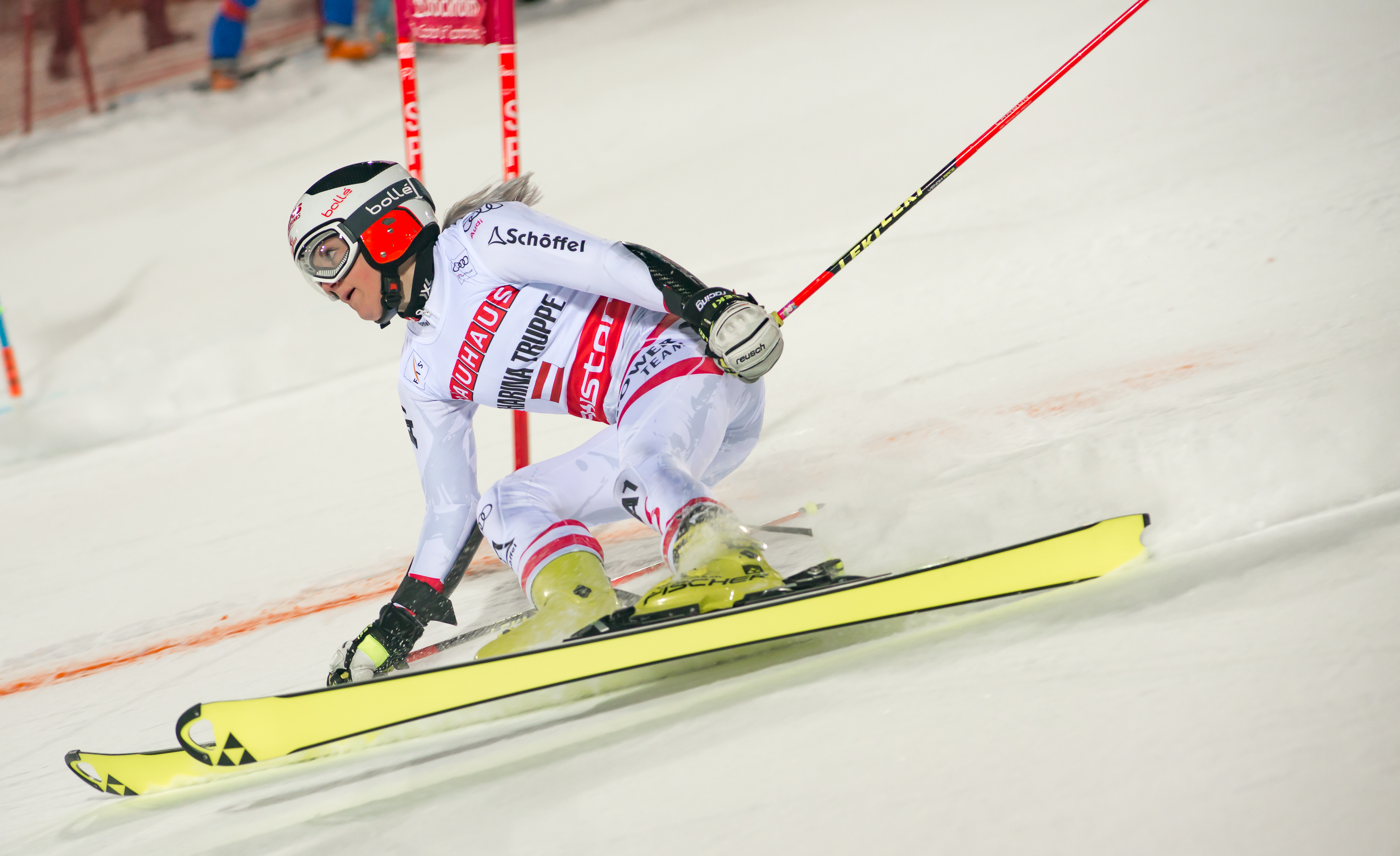
Katharina Truppe in Hammarbybacken World Cup 2018

=== Race podiums ===
- 1 win (1 SL)
- 7 podiums (7 SL); 50 top tens

Season
Season	Date	Location	Discipline	Place
2020	23 November 2019	Levi, Finland	Slalom	3rd
2020	16 February 2020	Kranjska Gora, Slovenia	Slalom	3rd
2023	27 November 2022	Killington, United States	Slalom	3rd
2024	21 December 2023	Courchevel, France	Slalom	3rd
2025	9 March 2025	Åre, Sweden	Slalom	1st
2026	13 January 2026	Flachau, Austria	Slalom	3rd
2027	14 November 2026	Levi, Finland	Slalom	3rd

== World Championship results ==
Year
Year	Age	Slalom	Giant slalom	Super-G	Downhill	Combined	Team combined	Team event
2017	21	19	DSQ1	—	—	—	—N/a	5
2019	23	8	24	—	—	—	—N/a	2
2023	27	18	—	—	—	—	—N/a	—
2025	29	7	—	—	—	—N/a	3	—

== Olympic results ==
Year
Year	Age	Slalom	Giant slalom	Super-G	Downhill	Combined	Team combined	Team event
2022	26	DNF1	4	—	—	—	—N/a	1
2026	30	5	—	—	—	—N/a	5	—N/a
