= Katie Vesterstein =

American-Estonian alpine skier (born 1999)

Personal information
- Full name: Kaitlyn Vesterstein
- Nationality: United States Estonia
- Born: June 21, 1999 (age 27) Duluth, Minnesota, U.S.

Sport
- Sport: Skiing
- Club: University of Utah

Kaitlyn Vesterstein (born June 21, 1999) is an alpine skier, who competed at the 2022 Winter Olympics. Born in the United States, Vesterstein now competes for Estonia, and the University of Utah college team.

== Personal life ==
Vesterstein is from Duluth, Minnesota, US. Her grandfather and great-uncle were both skiers in Estonia, and her grandfather moved from Estonia to Duluth in the 1950s. He had fled to Germany during the Second World War, and was later a forced displacement from the Soviet Union to the United States.

At the age of 10, Vesterstein moved to Park City, Utah. As a youngster, she competed in soccer, horseback riding, water skiing, and cross-country skiing. Vesterstein has studied finance at the University of Utah, and planned to study a master's degree in finance in 2022.

== Career ==
Vesterstein started skiing at Spirit Mountain. In 2016, she won first place in the slalom at the under-16s event at the US team's training base, and came second at a Dan Nagy Memorial under-19s event. In 2017, she came 17th in the slalom event at the United States Alpine Ski Championships, and third in the under-18 slalom event at the North American Championships. In 2018, Vesterstein chose to compete internationally for Estonia, as she felt that competing for the US junior team was too stressful, and too expensive. At the time of her nationality change, Vesterstein had only been to Estonia once, in 2017, and did not speak Estonian. She was not eligible to compete for Estonia at the 2018 Winter Olympics in Pyeongchang, South Korea, as her nationality change had not been completed at the time of the Games. That year, she came 12th in the alpine combined event at the US National Championships, and 19th in the Super-G event.

Vesterstein has competed for the University of Utah college team. Her college sport eligibility was increased by one year due to the impact of the COVID-19 pandemic. In 2021, she finished 10th in the slalom event at the NCAA Championships, and won second-team All-America honors. In January 2022, she was part of the Utah team that won an event at Park City Mountain Resort.

In the same month, Vesterstein was confirmed in the Estonian team for the 2022 Winter Olympics. She competed in the slalom and giant slalom events, At the Games, she finished 35th in the giant slalom and did not finish her first run in the slalom event after falling. She came third in the women's slalom event at the Rocky Mountain Intercollegiate Ski Association competition in Steamboat Springs, Colorado.
