= 2017 NCAA Skiing Championships =

American college skiing competition

2017 NCAA Skiing tournament
- Teams: 21
- Format: Duration scoring
- Finals site: (New Hampshire) Franconia, New Hampshire; Cannon Mountain Ski Area
- Champions: Utah Utes (11th title)
- Runner-up: Colorado Buffaloes (30th title game)
- Semifinalists: Denver Pioneers; Dartmouth Big Green
- Winning coach: Kevin Sweeney (1st title)
- MVP: Martin Bergstroem ((Utah))
- Television: NCAA

The 2017 NCAA Skiing Championships took place from March 8 to March 11 in Franconia, New Hampshire at the Cannon Mountain Ski Area. The tournament went into its 64th consecutive NCAA Skiing Championships, and featured twenty-one teams across all divisions.

== Team results ==
- Note: Top 10 only
- (H): Team from hosting U.S. state

Rank	Team	Points
1st place, gold medalist(s)	Utah	541 1/2
2nd place, silver medalist(s)	Colorado	525
3rd place, bronze medalist(s)	Denver	524
4	Dartmouth (H)	400
5	Vermont	355
6	Montana State	320
7	New Mexico	188 1/2
8	Northern Michigan	182
9	New Hampshire (H)	146
10	Colby	142 1/2

== Individual results ==
- Note: Table does not include consolation
- (H): Individual from hosting U.S. State

Games	First	Second	Third
Women's giant slalom details	Benedicte Lyche; Montana State	Stephanie Gartner; Montana State	Roni Remme; Utah
Women's giant slalom details	Benedicte Lyche; Montana State	Stephanie Gartner; Montana State	Tuva Norbye (Colorado) Denver
Women's 5K classical details	Petra Hyncicova; Colorado	Merete Myrseth; Utah	Alayna Sonnesyn; Vermont
Women's 5K classical details	Petra Hyncicova; Colorado	Merete Myrseth; Utah	Christina Rolandsen; Colorado
Women's slalom details	Paula Moltzan; Vermont	Andrea Kosmic (Colorado) Denver	Foreste Peterson (New Hampshire) Dartmouth (H)
Women's slalom details	Paula Moltzan; Vermont	Andrea Kosmic (Colorado) Denver	Monica Huebner (Colorado) Denver
Women's 15K freestyle details	Petra Hyncicova; Colorado	Alayna Sonnesyn; Vermont	Christina Rolandsen; Colorado
Women's 15K freestyle details	Petra Hyncicova; Colorado	Alayna Sonnesyn; Vermont	Anika Miller; Montana State
Men's giant slalom details	David Ketterer; Colorado	Sam Dupratt; Utah	Brian McLaughlin (New Hampshire) Dartmouth (H)
Men's giant slalom details	David Ketterer; Colorado	Sam Dupratt; Utah	Max Roeisland; Vermont
Men's 10K classical details	Martin Bergstroem; Utah	Dag Frode Trolleboe (Colorado) Denver	Martin Mikkelsen; Utah
Men's 10K classical details	Martin Bergstroem; Utah	Dag Frode Trolleboe (Colorado) Denver	Petter Reistad; Colorado
Men's slalom details	David Ketterer; Colorado	William St. Germain; Vermont	Erik Read (Colorado) Denver
Men's slalom details	David Ketterer; Colorado	William St. Germain; Vermont	Thomas Woolson (New Hampshire) Dartmouth (H)
Men's 20K freestyle details	Martin Bergstroem; Utah	Mads Ek Stroem; Colorado	Moritz Madlener (Colorado) Denver
Men's 20K freestyle details	Martin Bergstroem; Utah	Mads Ek Stroem; Colorado	Petter Reistad; Colorado
