= Daniel Danklmaier =

Austrian alpine skier

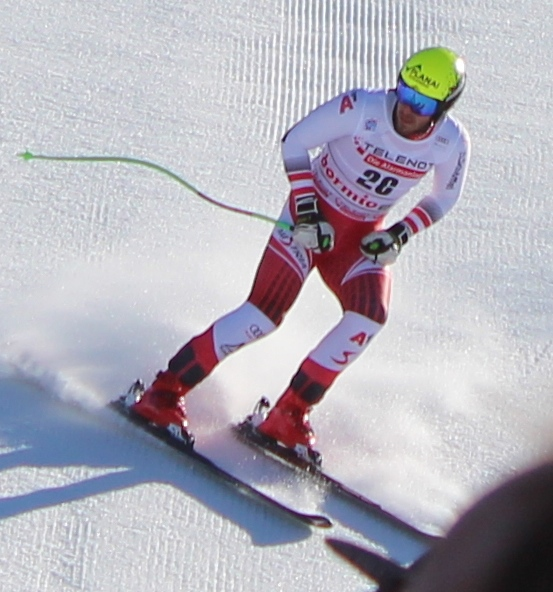
- Danklmaier in 2019 in Bormio

Personal information
- Born: 24 April 1993 (age 33) Aich, Austria

Skiing career
- Sport: Alpine skiing
- Disciplines: Speed events
- World Cup debut: 2016

World Championships
- Teams: 1

World Cup
- Seasons: 6
- Podiums: 0
Medal record
Men's alpine skiing
Representing Austria
Junior World Championships
Silver medal – second place	2014 Jasná	Super-G

Daniel Danklmaier (born 24 April 1993) is an Austrian alpine skier.

== Career ==
He participated at one edition of the Alpine Ski World Championships, at a young level he won a silver medal in Super-G at the World Junior Alpine Skiing Championships 2014.

As often happens for speed events specialists, his explosion in the World Cup was a bit late, in fact, it took place at the dawn of 29 years, in the World Cup 2022 season, in which he finished 5 times in the top ten, qualified both downhill and super-G for the Meribel finals (where only the first 25 of the ranking of each specialty are allowed), and finished 15th in the downhill world cup standings.

However, the blindfolded goddess was no friend to him, on 12 April 2022, in training in Solden, he suffered an injury to the meniscus and the cruciate ligament of his left leg.

== World Cup results ==
Top 10

Date	Place	Discipline	Rank
16-03-2022	(France) Courchevel/Meribel	Downhill	9
04-03-2022	(Norway) Kvitfjell	Downhill	7
23-01-2022	(Austria) Kitzbuehel	Downhill	10
13-01-2022	(Switzerland) Wengen	Super G	10
28-12-2021	(Italy) Bormio	Downhill	9
25-01-2019	(Austria) Kitzbuehel	Downhill	5
