= Marcus Monsen =

Norwegian alpine skier (born 1995)

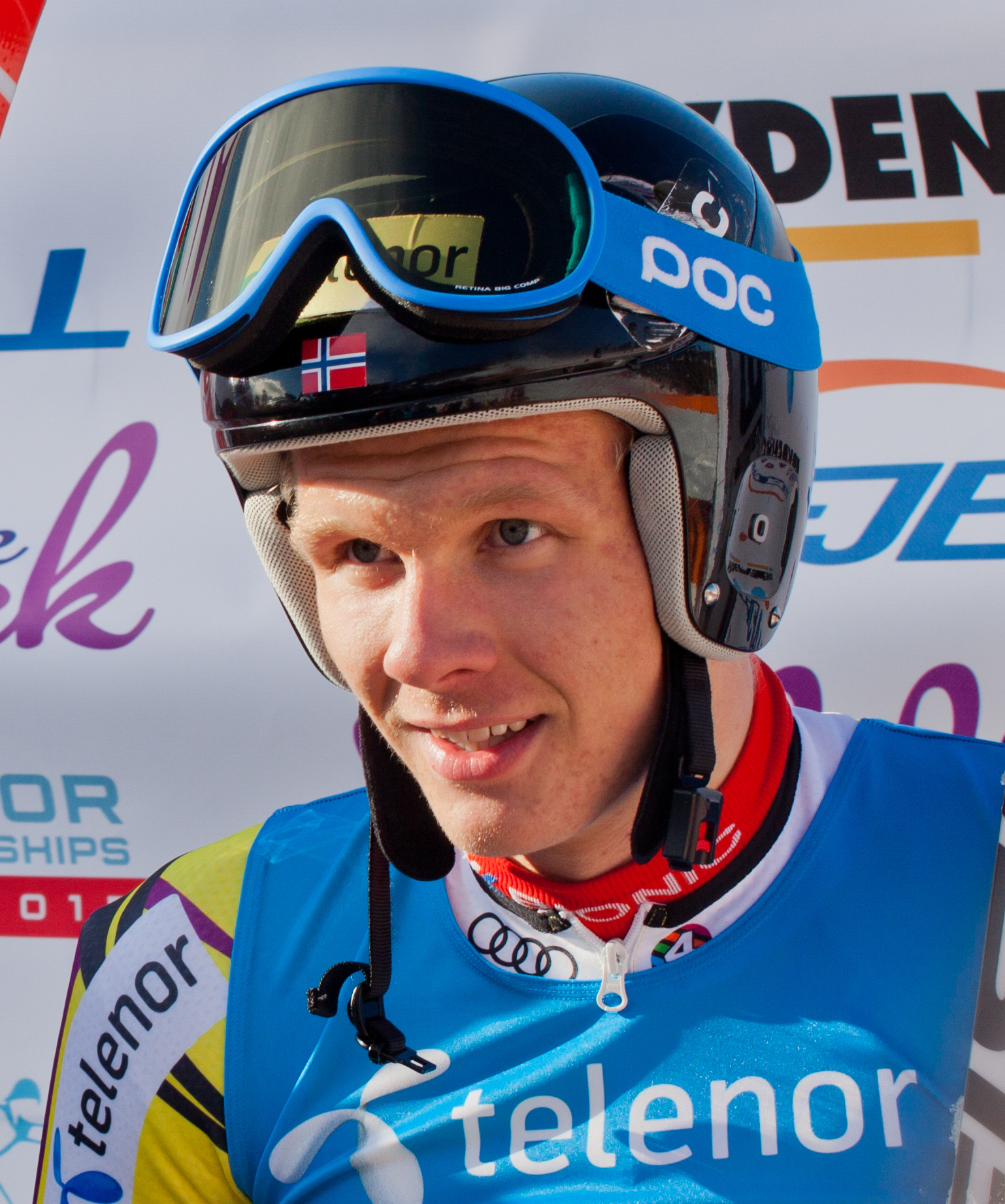
Marcus Monsen (2015).

Marcus Monsen (born 19 February 1995) is a Norwegian former alpine skier.

== Career ==
At the 2012 Winter Youth Olympics he managed a 6th, 5th and 4th place. He competed in five events at both the 2014, 2015 and the 2016 Junior World Championships; winning three silver medals and two bronze medals.

He made his FIS Alpine Ski World Cup debut in February 2014 in St. Moritz, where he also collected his first World Cup points with a 24th-place finish. He did not finish another World Cup race (exclusively participating in giant slalom) until March 2017 in Kranjska Gora, where he finished 17th. Only finishing a single race in the 2017–18 season, the one in March 2018 in Kranjska Gora, he only competed three times in the 2018–19 without qualifying for the main event.

He represented the sports club Aron SK. He is the older brother of Marte Monsen.
