= Maria Ioana Constantin =

Romanian alpine skier (born 2001)

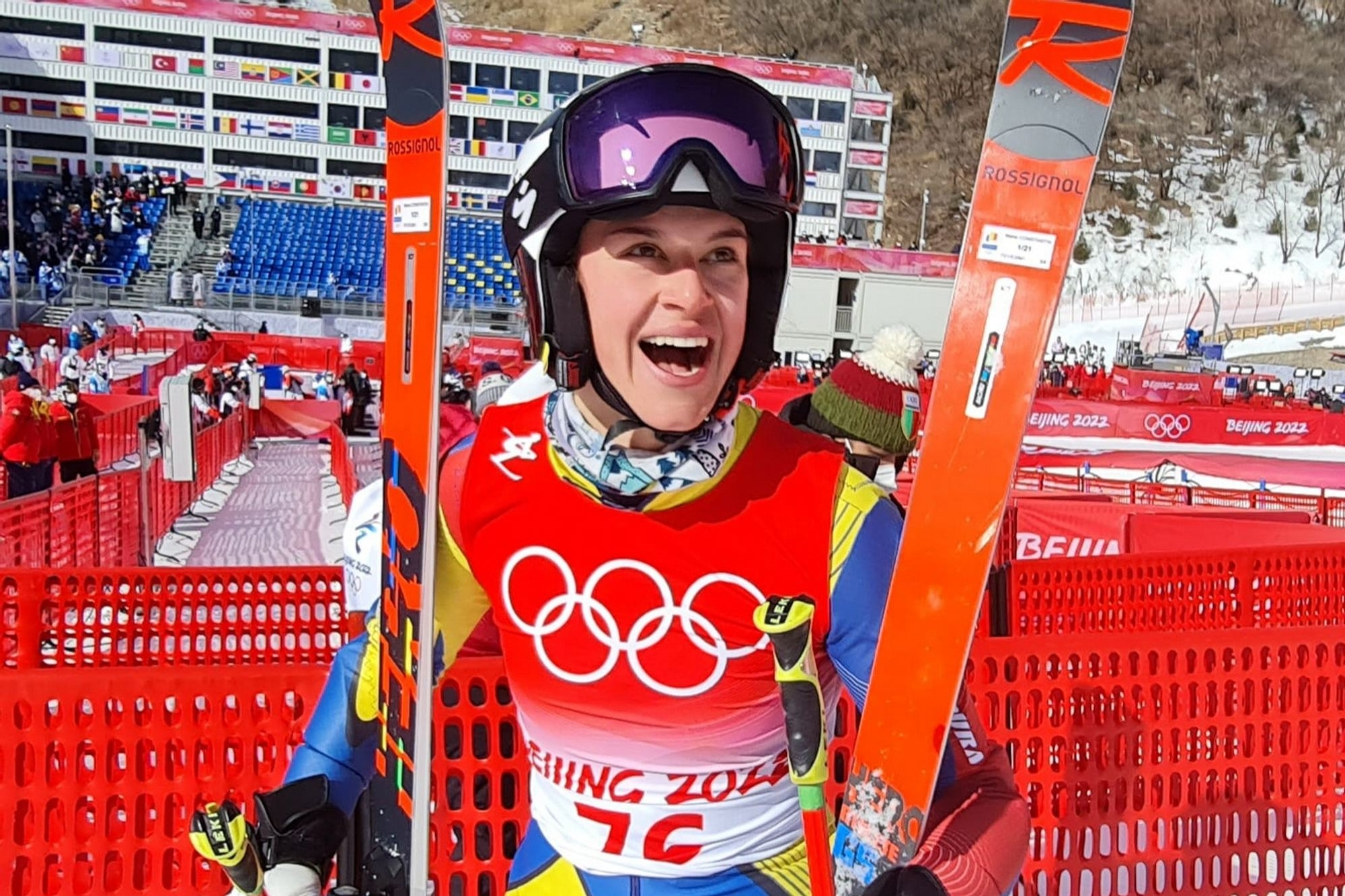

Personal information
- Born: 5 January 2001 (age 25) Predeal, Romania
- Education: Faculty of Physical Education and Mountain Sports
- Occupation: Alpine skiing
- Height: 180 cm (5 ft 11 in)
- Weight: 66 kg (146 lb)

Sport
- Country: Romania
- Sport: Alpine skiing
- Club: CSA Steaua Bucuresti
- Coached by: Szilagyi Andrei

Maria Ioana Constantin (born 5 January 2001) is a Romanian alpine skier. She competed at the 2022 Winter Olympics, in Women's slalom, and Women's giant slalom.

She competed at the 2021 FIS World Ski Championships at Cortina d'Ampezzo and FIS Junior World Ski Championship.
