= Alpine skiing at the 2022 Winter Olympics – Women's giant slalom =

Women's giant slalom at the XXIV Olympic Winter Games
- Alpine skiing
- Venue: Ice River, Yanqing District
- Date: 7 February 2022
- Competitors: 82 from 49 nations
- Winning time: 1:55.69

Medalists
1st place, gold medalist(s)		Sara Hector	Sweden
2nd place, silver medalist(s)		Federica Brignone	Italy
3rd place, bronze medalist(s)		Lara Gut-Behrami	Switzerland

The women's giant slalom competition of the Beijing 2022 Olympics was held on 7 February, on "Ice River" course at the Yanqing National Alpine Ski Centre in Yanqing District. The Olympic champion was Sara Hector of Sweden, for whom this is the first Olympic medal. Federica Brignone of Italy won silver, and Lara Gut-Behrami of Switzerland bronze.

Mikaela Shiffrin was the defending champion. The silver medalist, Ragnhild Mowinckel, and the bronze medalist, Federica Brignone, qualified as well. At the 2021–22 FIS Alpine Ski World Cup, six giant slalom events were held before the Olympics. Sara Hector was leading the ranking, followed by Tessa Worley and Shiffrin. Lara Gut-Behrami is the 2021 world champion, with Shiffrin and Katharina Liensberger being the silver and bronze medalists, respectively.

In the first run, Hector skied the fastest, followed by Katharina Truppe and Brignone. Shiffrin did not finish the first run and thus could not defend the title. Gut-Behrami, eighth in the first run, set the fastest time in the second run. She remained on top until Brignone has finished, with Truppe and Hector still to go. Truppe was only third overall after her finish, guaranteeing a medal for Gut-Behrami. Hector skied the eight time of the run but still finished 0.28 seconds ahead of Brignone.

Sixth after the first run, Nina O'Brien crashed near the finish of her second run, badly fractured her leg, and was hospitalized.

== Results ==
Results are as follows:

Rank	Bib	Name	Nation	Run 1	Rank	Run 2	Rank	Total	Behind
1st place, gold medalist(s)	6	Sara Hector	Sweden	57.56	1	58.13	8	1:55.69	
2nd place, silver medalist(s)	3	Federica Brignone	Italy	57.98	3	57.99	5	1:55.97	+0.28
3rd place, bronze medalist(s)	14	Lara Gut-Behrami	Switzerland	59.07	8	57.34	1	1:56.41	+0.72
4	8	Katharina Truppe	Austria	57.86	2	58.63	14	1:56.49	+0.80
5	11	Ragnhild Mowinckel	Norway	58.58	5	58.07	6	1:56.65	+0.96
6	28	Thea Louise Stjernesund	Norway	59.39	15	57.50	2	1:56.89	+1.20
7	9	Meta Hrovat	Slovenia	58.48	4	58.56	13	1:57.04	+1.35
8	12	Maryna Gąsienica-Daniel	Poland	59.24	11	57.87	4	1:57.11	+1.42
9	16	Wendy Holdener	Switzerland	59.21	10	58.11	7	1:57.32	+1.63
10	2	Michelle Gisin	Switzerland	59.19	9	58.36	9	1:57.55	+1.86
11	20	Ana Bucik	Slovenia	59.42	16	58.47	11	1:57.89	+2.20
12	26	Paula Moltzan	United States	59.57	17	58.50	12	1:58.07	+2.38
12	25	Maria Therese Tviberg	Norway	59.67	18	58.40	10	1:58.07	+2.38
14	1	Petra Vlhová	Slovakia	59.34	13	58.81	16	1:58.15	+2.46
15	15	Katharina Liensberger	Austria	59.34	13	58.90	17	1:58.24	+2.55
16	24	Camille Rast	Switzerland	59.29	12	59.14	20	1:58.43	+2.74
17	23	Coralie Frasse Sombet	France	1:00.91	26	57.69	3	1:58.60	+2.91
18	27	Tina Robnik	Slovenia	1:00.18	21	58.72	15	1:58.90	+3.21
19	30	Clara Direz	France	1:00.24	23	59.09	19	1:59.33	+3.64
20	17	Elena Curtoni	Italy	1:00.50	24	59.41	21	1:59.91	+4.22
21	44	Emma Aicher	Germany	1:01.52	30	59.00	18	2:00.52	+4.83
22	35	Alexandra Tilley	Great Britain	1:01.40	28	59.42	22	2:00.82	+5.13
22	10	Alice Robinson	New Zealand	1:00.55	25	1:00.27	24	2:00.82	+5.13
24	36	Asa Ando	Japan	1:01.43	29	59.56	23	2:00.99	+5.30
25	38	Ekaterina Tkachenko	ROC	1:01.55	31	1:00.86	25	2:02.41	+6.72
26	39	Magdalena Łuczak	Poland	1:01.96	32	1:00.89	26	2:02.85	+7.16
27	41	Julia Pleshkova	ROC	1:02.01	33	1:01.31	28	2:03.32	+7.63
28	37	Zrinka Ljutić	Croatia	1:02.50	35	1:01.27	27	2:03.77	+8.08
29	52	Francesca Baruzzi	Argentina	1:02.43	34	1:01.57	30	2:04.00	+8.31
30	42	Zuzanna Czapska	Poland	1:03.63	37	1:01.52	29	2:05.15	+9.46
31	47	Sakurako Mukogawa	Japan	1:03.39	36	1:03.38	33	2:06.77	+11.08
32	50	Polina Melnikova	ROC	1:04.13	39	1:03.07	31	2:07.20	+11.51
33	55	Gim So-hui	South Korea	1:04.12	38	1:03.10	32	2:07.22	+11.53
34	58	Nino Tsiklauri	Georgia	1:04.49	41	1:05.38	35	2:09.87	+14.18
35	62	Katie Vesterstein	Estonia	1:05.39	43	1:05.05	34	2:10.44	+14.75
36	68	Eva Vukadinova	Bulgaria	1:05.58	44	1:05.88	37	2:11.46	+15.77
37	53	Sarah Schleper	Mexico	1:06.42	47	1:05.53	36	2:11.95	+16.26
38	67	Aruwin Salehhuddin	Malaysia	1:06.13	46	1:06.15	38	2:12.28	+16.59
39	64	Anastasiia Shepilenko	Ukraine	1:05.95	45	1:06.38	40	2:12.33	+16.64
40	70	Kong Fanying	China	1:08.25	50	1:07.17	41	2:15.42	+19.73
41	59	Mialitiana Clerc	Madagascar	1:08.71	52	1:07.31	42	2:16.02	+20.33
42	69	Emilia Aramburo	Chile	1:07.71	49	1:08.61	44	2:16.32	+20.63
43	65	Vanina Guerillot	Portugal	1:10.59	55	1:06.33	39	2:16.92	+21.23
44	71	Ni Yueming	China	1:08.75	53	1:08.31	43	2:17.06	+21.37
45	76	Maria Constantin	Romania	1:08.25	50	1:10.25	45	2:18.50	+22.81
46	79	Ornella Oettl Reyes	Peru	1:12.52	56	1:11.53	46	2:24.05	+28.36
47	81	Anna Torsani	San Marino	1:13.89	57	1:15.37	48	2:29.26	+33.57
48	80	Özlem Çarıkçıoğlu	Turkey	1:15.98	58	1:14.75	47	2:30.73	+35.04
49	82	Kiana Kryeziu	Kosovo	1:18.78	59	1:23.41	49	2:42.19	+46.50
	4	Tessa Worley	France	58.93	7	DNF	—N/a		
	13	Ramona Siebenhofer	Austria	59.86	19	DNF	—N/a		
	29	Andreja Slokar	Slovenia	1:00.08	20	DNF	—N/a		
	33	Hilma Lövblom	Sweden	1:01.18	27	DNF	—N/a		
	34	Hanna Aronsson Elfman	Sweden	1:00.19	22	DNF	—N/a		
	48	Núria Pau	Spain	1:04.19	40	DNF	—N/a		
	51	Noa Szőllős	Israel	1:04.90	42	DNF	—N/a		
	57	Rebeka Jančová	Slovakia	1:06.56	48	DNF	—N/a		
	75	Manon Ouaiss	Lebanon	1:08.88	54	DNF	—N/a		
	78	Sarah Escobar	Ecuador	1:21.26	60	DNF	—N/a		
	21	Nina O'Brien	United States	58.81	6	DSQ	—N/a		
	5	Marta Bassino	Italy	DNF	—N/a				
	7	Mikaela Shiffrin	United States	DNF	—N/a				
	18	Mina Fürst Holtmann	Norway	DNF	—N/a				
	19	Valérie Grenier	Canada	DNF	—N/a				
	22	Stephanie Brunner	Austria	DNF	—N/a				
	31	AJ Hurt	United States	DNF	—N/a				
	32	Adriana Jelinkova	Netherlands	DNF	—N/a				
	40	Riikka Honkanen	Finland	DNF	—N/a				
	45	Erika Pykäläinen	Finland	DNF	—N/a				
	46	Cassidy Gray	Canada	DNF	—N/a				
	49	Kang Young-seo	South Korea	DNF	—N/a				
	54	Elese Sommerová	Czech Republic	DNF	—N/a				
	56	Zita Tóth	Hungary	DNF	—N/a				
	61	Hólmfríður Dóra Friðgeirsdóttir	Iceland	DNF	—N/a				
	63	Gwyneth ten Raa	Luxembourg	DNF	—N/a				
	66	Tess Arbez	Ireland	DNF	—N/a				
	72	Maria-Eleni Tsiovolou	Greece	DNF	—N/a				
	73	Mida Fah Jaiman	Thailand	DNF	—N/a				
	77	Jelena Vujičić	Montenegro	DNF	—N/a				
	74	Esma Alić	Bosnia and Herzegovina	DSQ	—N/a				
	43	Andrea Komšić	Croatia	DNS	—N/a				
	60	Hanna Zięba	Poland	DNS	—N/a				
