= Alpine skiing at the 2022 Winter Olympics – Women's slalom =

Women's slalom at the XXIV Olympic Winter Games
- Alpine skiing
- Venue: Ice River, Yanqing District
- Date: 9 February 2022
- Competitors: 88 from 51 nations
- Winning time: 1:44.98

Medalists
| 1st place, gold medalist(s) | | Petra Vlhová | Slovakia |
| 2nd place, silver medalist(s) | | Katharina Liensberger | Austria |
| 3rd place, bronze medalist(s) | | Wendy Holdener | Switzerland |

The women's slalom competition of the Beijing 2022 Olympics was held on 9 February, " on Ice River" course at the Yanqing National Alpine Ski Centre in Yanqing District. Petra Vlhová of Slovakia won the event. This was the first Olympic medal for Vlhová and the first Olympic medal in alpine skiing for Slovakia. Katharina Liensberger of Austria won silver, her first individual Olympic medal, and Wendy Holdener of Switzerland bronze.

Frida Hansdotter, the 2018 champion, retired from competitions. The silver medalist, Holdener, and the bronze medalist, Katharina Gallhuber, qualified for the Olympics. At the 2021–22 FIS Alpine Ski World Cup, seven slalom events were held before the Olympics. Petra Vlhová was leading the ranking, followed by Mikaela Shiffrin, Holdener, and Lena Dürr. Katharina Liensberger is the 2021 world champion, with Vlhová and Shiffrin being the silver and bronze medalists, respectively.

== Results ==
Results were as follows:

| Rank | Bib | Name | Nation | Run 1 | Rank | Run 2 | Rank | Total | Behind |
|---|---|---|---|---|---|---|---|---|---|
| 1st place, gold medalist(s) | 2 | Petra Vlhová | Slovakia | 52.89 | 8 | 52.09 | 1 | 1:44.98 | |
| 2nd place, silver medalist(s) | 5 | Katharina Liensberger | Austria | 52.83 | 7 | 52.23 | 2 | 1:45.06 | +0.08 |
| 3rd place, bronze medalist(s) | 6 | Wendy Holdener | Switzerland | 52.65 | 5 | 52.45 | 4 | 1:45.10 | +0.12 |
| 4 | 1 | Lena Dürr | Germany | 52.17 | 1 | 53.00 | 9 | 1:45.17 | +0.19 |
| 5 | 17 | Andreja Slokar | Slovenia | 52.64 | 4 | 52.56 | 5 | 1:45.20 | +0.22 |
| 6 | 4 | Michelle Gisin | Switzerland | 52.20 | 2 | 53.38 | 18 | 1:45.58 | +0.60 |
| 7 | 16 | Camille Rast | Switzerland | 53.35 | 9 | 52.40 | 3 | 1:45.75 | +0.77 |
| 8 | 13 | Paula Moltzan | United States | 52.79 | 6 | 53.39 | 20 | 1:46.18 | +1.20 |
| 9 | 3 | Anna Swenn-Larsson | Sweden | 53.44 | 11 | 52.87 | 6 | 1:46.31 | +1.33 |
| 10 | 28 | Aline Danioth | Switzerland | 53.66 | 13 | 52.98 | 8 | 1:46.64 | +1.66 |
| 11 | 14 | Ana Bucik | Slovenia | 53.73 | 14 | 52.94 | 7 | 1:46.67 | +1.69 |
| 12 | 18 | Katharina Huber | Austria | 53.54 | 12 | 53.38 | 18 | 1:46.92 | +1.94 |
| 13 | 11 | Martina Dubovská | Czech Republic | 53.90 | 16 | 53.13 | 14 | 1:47.03 | +2.05 |
| 14 | 8 | Katharina Gallhuber | Austria | 53.40 | 10 | 53.93 | 25 | 1:47.33 | +2.35 |
| 15 | 25 | Thea Louise Stjernesund | Norway | 54.22 | 19 | 53.26 | 16 | 1:47.48 | +2.50 |
| 16 | 21 | Erin Mielzynski | Canada | 53.93 | 17 | 53.59 | 22 | 1:47.52 | +2.54 |
| 17 | 9 | Laurence St-Germain | Canada | 54.51 | 22 | 53.06 | 10 | 1:47.57 | +2.59 |
| 18 | 29 | Emma Aicher | Germany | 54.48 | 21 | 53.11 | 12 | 1:47.59 | +2.61 |
| 19 | 22 | Nastasia Noens | France | 54.68 | 24 | 53.18 | 15 | 1:47.86 | +2.88 |
| 20 | 45 | Maria Shkanova | Belarus | 54.79 | 25 | 53.10 | 11 | 1:47.89 | +2.91 |
| 21 | 24 | Charlie Guest | Great Britain | 53.84 | 15 | 54.12 | 28 | 1:47.96 | +2.98 |
| 21 | 19 | Ali Nullmeyer | Canada | 54.67 | 23 | 53.29 | 17 | 1:47.96 | +2.98 |
| 23 | 10 | Leona Popović | Croatia | 55.31 | 30 | 53.11 | 12 | 1:48.42 | +3.44 |
| 24 | 27 | Charlotta Säfvenberg | Sweden | 55.25 | 27 | 53.45 | 21 | 1:48.70 | +3.72 |
| 25 | 36 | Zrinka Ljutić | Croatia | 55.03 | 26 | 53.88 | 23 | 1:48.91 | +3.93 |
| 26 | 40 | Katie Hensien | United States | 55.43 | 31 | 53.88 | 23 | 1:49.31 | +4.33 |
| 27 | 26 | Amelia Smart | Canada | 55.26 | 28 | 54.06 | 26 | 1:49.32 | +4.34 |
| 28 | 32 | Elsa Fermbäck | Sweden | 55.26 | 28 | 54.07 | 27 | 1:49.33 | +4.35 |
| 29 | 46 | Anita Gulli | Italy | 55.46 | 32 | 54.32 | 29 | 1:49.78 | +4.80 |
| 30 | 33 | Lara Della Mea | Italy | 56.00 | 35 | 54.53 | 30 | 1:50.53 | +5.55 |
| 31 | 48 | Ekaterina Tkachenko | ROC | 55.97 | 34 | 54.71 | 31 | 1:50.68 | +5.70 |
| 32 | 35 | Gabriela Capová | Czech Republic | 55.96 | 33 | 55.28 | 33 | 1:51.24 | +6.26 |
| 33 | 43 | Anastasia Gornostaeva | ROC | 56.39 | 39 | 55.11 | 32 | 1:51.50 | +6.52 |
| 34 | 44 | AJ Hurt | United States | 56.68 | 40 | 55.51 | 34 | 1:52.19 | +7.21 |
| 35 | 47 | Sakurako Mukogawa | Japan | 56.09 | 36 | 56.64 | 37 | 1:52.73 | +7.75 |
| 36 | 51 | Polina Melnikova | ROC | 56.86 | 41 | 55.88 | 35 | 1:52.74 | +7.76 |
| 37 | 41 | Riikka Honkanen | Finland | 56.33 | 37 | 56.64 | 37 | 1:52.97 | +7.99 |
| 38 | 62 | Hólmfríður Dóra Friðgeirsdóttir | Iceland | 57.39 | 43 | 56.48 | 36 | 1:53.87 | +8.89 |
| 39 | 54 | Gim So-hui | South Korea | 57.31 | 42 | 56.80 | 39 | 1:54.11 | +9.13 |
| 40 | 55 | Zita Tóth | Hungary | 57.97 | 44 | 57.89 | 40 | 1:55.86 | +10.88 |
| 41 | 61 | Noa Szőllős | Israel | 58.21 | 45 | 59.13 | 41 | 1:57.34 | +12.36 |
| 42 | 65 | Nino Tsiklauri | Georgia | 1:00.11 | 47 | 1:00.37 | 42 | 2:00.48 | +15.50 |
| 43 | 59 | Mialitiana Clerc | Madagascar | 1:02.22 | 51 | 1:00.66 | 43 | 2:02.88 | +17.90 |
| 44 | 78 | Ornella Oettl Reyes | Peru | 1:03.25 | 53 | 1:01.34 | 44 | 2:04.59 | +19.61 |
| 45 | 71 | Esma Alić | Bosnia and Herzegovina | 1:01.72 | 50 | 1:02.93 | 45 | 2:04.65 | +19.67 |
| 46 | 83 | Manon Ouaiss | Lebanon | 1:02.69 | 52 | 1:02.96 | 46 | 2:05.65 | +20.67 |
| 47 | 80 | Kong Fanying | China | 1:05.97 | 54 | 1:05.98 | 47 | 2:11.95 | +26.97 |
| 48 | 75 | Tess Arbez | Ireland | 1:07.83 | 55 | 1:06.78 | 48 | 2:14.61 | +29.63 |
| 49 | 82 | Özlem Çarıkçıoğlu | Turkey | 1:09.45 | 56 | 1:09.47 | 49 | 2:18.92 | +33.94 |
| 50 | 88 | Lee Wen-yi | Chinese Taipei | 1:36.49 | 58 | 1:09.55 | 50 | 2:46.04 | +1:01.06 |
| | 12 | Sara Hector | Sweden | 52.29 | 3 | DNF | —N/a | | |
| | 20 | Mina Fürst Holtmann | Norway | 54.19 | 18 | DNF | —N/a | | |
| | 31 | Federica Brignone | Italy | 54.41 | 20 | DNF | —N/a | | |
| | 50 | Elese Sommerová | Czech Republic | 56.38 | 38 | DNF | —N/a | | |
| | 64 | Vanina Guerillot | Portugal | 59.45 | 46 | DNF | —N/a | | |
| | 68 | Liene Bondare | Latvia | 1:00.45 | 48 | DNF | —N/a | | |
| | 66 | Eva Vukadinova | Bulgaria | 1:01.71 | 49 | DNF | —N/a | | |
| | 81 | Atefeh Ahmadi | Iran | 1:11.88 | 57 | DNF | —N/a | | |
| | 7 | Mikaela Shiffrin | United States | DNF | —N/a | | | | |
| | 15 | Katharina Truppe | Austria | DNF | —N/a | | | | |
| | 23 | Maria Therese Tviberg | Norway | DNF | —N/a | | | | |
| | 30 | Neja Dvornik | Slovenia | DNF | —N/a | | | | |
| | 34 | Meta Hrovat | Slovenia | DNF | —N/a | | | | |
| | 37 | Asa Ando | Japan | DNF | —N/a | | | | |
| | 38 | Rosa Pohjolainen | Finland | DNF | —N/a | | | | |
| | 39 | Alex Tilley | Great Britain | DNF | —N/a | | | | |
| | 42 | Andrea Komšić | Croatia | DNF | —N/a | | | | |
| | 49 | Kaitlyn Vesterstein | Estonia | DNF | —N/a | | | | |
| | 52 | Magdalena Łuczak | Poland | DNF | —N/a | | | | |
| | 53 | Kathryn Parker | Australia | DNF | —N/a | | | | |
| | 56 | Kang Young-seo | South Korea | DNF | —N/a | | | | |
| | 57 | Erika Pykäläinen | Finland | DNF | —N/a | | | | |
| | 58 | Francesca Baruzzi Farriol | Argentina | DNF | —N/a | | | | |
| | 60 | Zuzanna Czapska | Poland | DNF | —N/a | | | | |
| | 63 | Rebeka Jančová | Slovakia | DNF | —N/a | | | | |
| | 67 | Gwyneth ten Raa | Luxembourg | DNF | —N/a | | | | |
| | 69 | Maria-Eleni Tsiovolou | Greece | DNF | —N/a | | | | |
| | 70 | Mida Fah Jaiman | Thailand | DNF | —N/a | | | | |
| | 72 | Aruwin Salehhuddin | Malaysia | DNF | —N/a | | | | |
| | 73 | Emilia Aramburo | Chile | DNF | —N/a | | | | |
| | 74 | Anastasiya Shepilenko | Ukraine | DNF | —N/a | | | | |
| | 76 | Ni Yueming | China | DNF | —N/a | | | | |
| | 77 | Jelena Vujičić | Montenegro | DNF | —N/a | | | | |
| | 79 | Maria Constantin | Romania | DNF | —N/a | | | | |
| | 84 | Gabija Šinkūnaitė | Lithuania | DNF | —N/a | | | | |
| | 85 | Alexandra Troitskaya | Kazakhstan | DNF | —N/a | | | | |
| | 86 | Audrey King | Hong Kong | DNF | —N/a | | | | |
| | 87 | Anna Torsani | San Marino | DNF | —N/a | | | | |
