= World Junior Alpine Skiing Championships 2014 =

International skiing competition

The World Junior Alpine Skiing Championships 2014 were the 33rd World Junior Alpine Skiing Championships, held between 26 February and 6 March 2014 in Jasná, Slovakia.

== Medal winners ==
=== Men's events ===
Event	Gold		Silver		Bronze	
Downhill	Adrian Smiseth Sejersted; Norway	1:17.31	Thomas Dreßen; Germany	1:17.33	Marco Schwarz; Austria	1:17.40
Super-G	Marco Schwarz; Austria	1:30.63	Daniel Danklmaier; Austria	1:30.67	Matteo de Vettori; Italy	1:30.79
Giant Slalom	Henrik Kristoffersen; Norway	2:03.14	Marcus Monsen; Norway	2:04.17	Rasmus Windingstad; Norway	2:04.34
Slalom	Henrik Kristoffersen; Norway	1:37.21	Luca Aerni; Switzerland	1:37.30	Daniel Yule; Switzerland	1:38.46
Combined	Matteo de Vettori; Italy	2:21.69	Adrian Smiseth Sejersted; Norway	2:21.74	Marcus Monsen; Norway	2:21.78

=== Women's events ===
Event	Gold		Silver		Bronze	
Downhill	Corinne Suter; Switzerland	1:24.19	Nora Grieg Christensen; Norway	1:24.96	Kerstin Nicolussi; Austria	1:25.50
Super-G	Corinne Suter; Switzerland	1:14.71	Stephanie Venier; Austria	1:15.18	Rosina Schneeberger; Austria	1:15.52
Giant Slalom	Marta Bassino; Italy	1:52.86	Karoline Pichler; Italy	1:53.13	Rosina Schneeberger; Austria	1:54.59
Slalom	Petra Vlhová; Slovakia	1:36.09	Charlotta Säfvenberg; Sweden	1:36.26	Marina Wallner; Germany	1:36.68
Combined	Elisabeth Kappauer; Austria	2:11.34	Lisa Blomqvist; Sweden	2:11.37	Marina Wallner; Germany	2:11.38

=== Team event ===
Event	Gold	Silver	Bronze
Team event	Sweden; Lisa Blomqvist; Magdalena Fjällström; Gustav Lundbäck; Max-Gordon Sundquist	Switzerland; Luca Aerni; Rahel Kopp; Bernhard Niederberger; Corinne Suter	Germany; Patrizia Dorsch; Sebastian Holzmann; David Ketterer; Marina Wallner
