= Marina Wallner =

German alpine skier (born 1994)

Personal information
- Born: 7 November 1994 (age 31) Traunstein, Germany

Skiing career
- Sport: Alpine skiing
- Club: SC Inzell
- Disciplines: Slalom

Olympics
- Teams: 1 – (2018)

Marina Wallner (born 7 November 1994) is a German former alpine ski racer.

== Olympic Games results ==
Year	Slalom	Giant slalom	Downhill	Super-G	Combined	Team
2018	19	–	–	–	–	5
