= Patrizia Dorsch =

German alpine skier (born 1994)

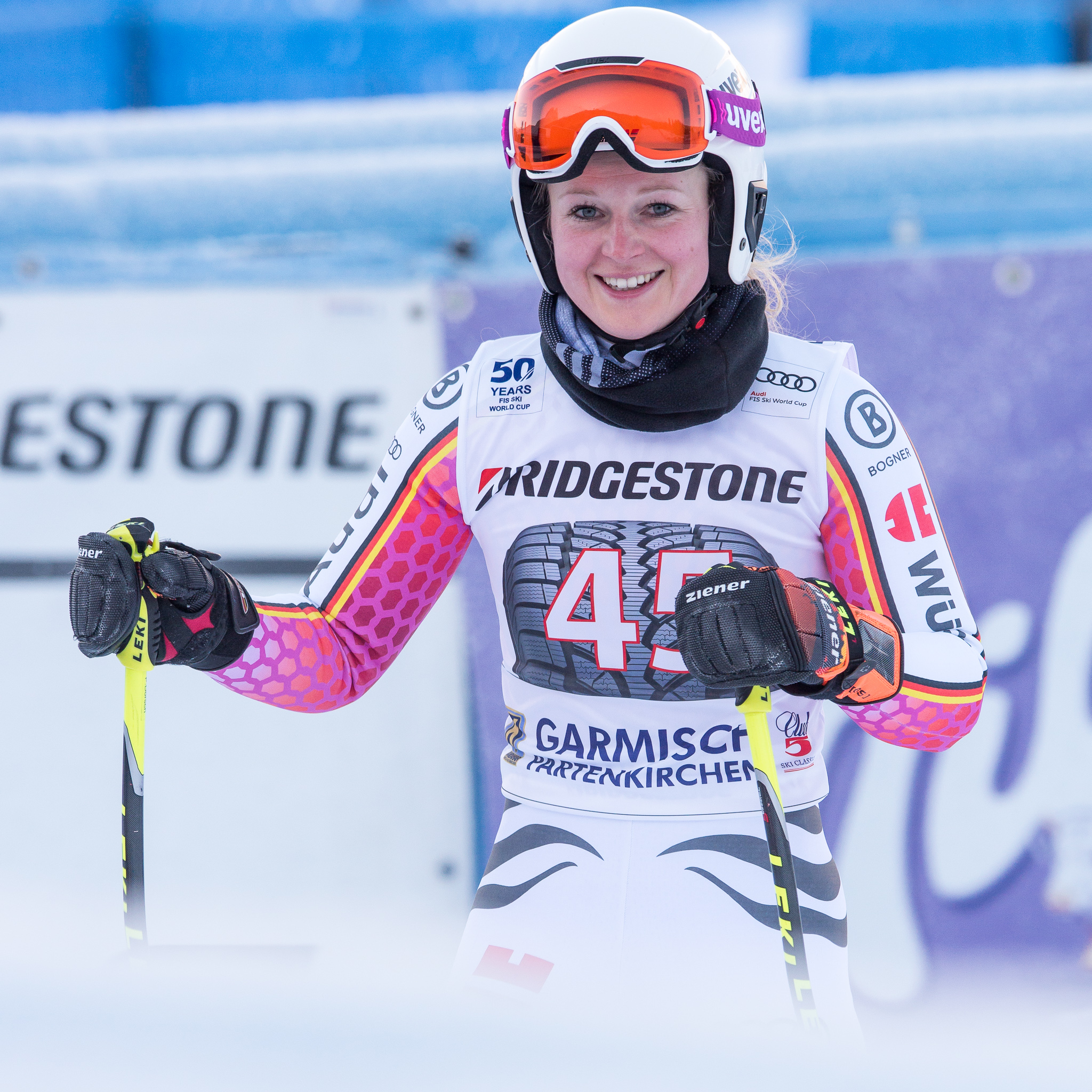
- At Garmisch-Partenkirchen in 2017

Personal information
- Born: 15 February 1994 (age 32) Berchtesgaden, Bavaria, Germany
- Height: 1.62 m (5 ft 4 in)

Skiing career
- Sport: Alpine skiing
- Club: SC Schellenberg
- Disciplines: Downhill, Super-G, Combined
- World Cup debut: 14 December 2013 (age 19)

Olympics
- Teams: 0

World Championships
- Teams: 0

World Cup
- Seasons: 5 − (2016–2020)
- Podiums: 0
- Overall titles: 0 – (74th in 2019)
- Discipline titles: 0 – (5th in AC, 2019)
Medal record
Women's alpine skiing
Representing Germany
Junior World Championships
| Bronze medal – third place | 2014 Jasná | Team event |
| Bronze medal – third place | 2015 Hafjell | Team event |

Patrizia Dorsch (born 15 February 1994) is a German World Cup alpine ski racer, and specializes in the speed events of Downhill and Super-G.

Born in Berchtesgaden, Bavaria, Dorsch made her World Cup debut in December 2013 and her best World Cup result is a fifth place in a combined event at Crans-Montana in 2019.

== World Cup results ==
=== Season standings ===
| Season | Age | Overall | Slalom | Giant slalom | Super-G | Downhill | Combined |
|---|---|---|---|---|---|---|---|
| 2016 | 22 | 91 | — | — | 48 | 48 | 28 |
| 2017 | 23 | 109 | — | — | — | — | 40 |
| 2018 | 24 | 84 | — | — | 40 | 43 | 31 |
| 2019 | 25 | 74 | — | — | 43 | 45 | 5 |
| 2020 | 26 | 89 | — | — | 52 | 44 | 32 |

=== Top ten finishes ===
- 0 podiums; 1 top ten

| Season | Date | Location | Discipline | Place |
|---|---|---|---|---|
| 2019 | 24 February 2019 | Crans-Montana, Switzerland | Combined | 5th |
