= World Junior Alpine Skiing Championships 2015 =

International skiing competition

The World Junior Alpine Skiing Championships 2015 were the 34th World Junior Alpine Skiing Championships, held between 6–13 March 2015 in Hafjell, Norway.

== Medal winners ==
=== Men's events ===
Event	Gold		Silver		Bronze	
Downhill	Henri Battilani; Italy	1:29.62	Marcus Monsen; Norway	1:29.95	Niels Hintermann; Switzerland	1:29.96
Super-G	Miha Hrobat; Slovenia	1:15.87	Štefan Hadalin; Slovenia	1:16.23	Loïc Meillard; Switzerland	1:16.40
Giant Slalom	Henrik Kristoffersen; Norway	2:23.37	Loïc Meillard; Switzerland	2:24.33	Marcus Monsen; Norway	2:24.53
Slalom	Henrik Kristoffersen; Norway	1:37.55	Marco Schwarz; Austria	1:39.10	AJ Ginnis; United States	1:39.30
Combined	Loïc Meillard; Switzerland	1:58.25	Štefan Hadalin; Slovenia	1:59.13	Miha Hrobat; Slovenia	1:59.23

=== Women's events ===
Event	Gold		Silver		Bronze	
Downhill	Mina Fürst Holtmann; Norway	1:32.58	Maria Therese Tviberg; Norway	1:33.08	Nicole Delago; Italy	1:33.33
Super-G	Federica Sosio; Italy	1:23.81	Mina Fürst Holtmann; Norway	1:24.02	Rahel Kopp; Switzerland	1:24.11
Giant Slalom	Nina Ortlieb; Austria	2:25.14	Stephanie Brunner; Austria	2:25.31	Valérie Grenier; Canada	2:25.34
Slalom	Paula Moltzan; United States	1:43.54	Marlene Schmotz; Germany	1:44.19	Katharina Truppe; Austria	1:44.53
Combined	Rahel Kopp; Switzerland	2:08.54	Romane Miradoli; France	2:08.90	Mina Fürst Holtmann; Norway	2:09.56

=== Team event ===
Event	Gold	Silver	Bronze
Team event	Norway; Peder Dahlum Eide; Julie Flo Mohagen; Max Røisland; Tonje Healey Trulsrud	Austria; Stephanie Brunner; Thomas Hettegger; Katharina Huber; Maximilian Lahnsteiner	Germany; Patrizia Dorsch; Alexander Schmid; Marlene Schmotz; Lukas Wasmeier
