= FIS Alpine World Ski Championships 2025 =

Skiing event in Sallbach-Hinterglemm, Austria

- Host city: Saalbach-Hinterglemm
- Country: Austria
- Events: 11
- Opening: 4 February 2025
- Closing: 16 February 2025
- Opened by: Alexander Van der Bellen
- Main venue: Skicircus Saalbach-Hinterglemm/Leogang
- Website: saalbach2025.com

Location in Europe
Location in the Alps

The 48th FIS Alpine World Ski Championships were held from 4 to 16 February 2025 in Saalbach-Hinterglemm, Austria.

The location was scheduled to be decided in May 2020 during the 52nd FIS Congress in Pattaya, Thailand, but was cancelled to the COVID-19 pandemic. The vote took place during a video conference on 3 October 2020. Saalbach-Hinterglemm won over German Garmisch-Partenkirchen and Swiss Crans-Montana by a vote of 12–1–1.

In the western part of Salzburg state near the Tyrol border, Saalbach-Hinterglemm previously hosted the World Championships in 1991; Austria last hosted in 2013 at Schladming in Styria.

The races took place in the piste along the Zwölferkogel (12er Kogel) gondola lift with finish in Hinterglemm.

== Schedule ==
Eleven events were held. (all times CET (UTC+1)):

Date	Time	Discipline
4 February	15:15	Mixed team parallel event
6 February	11:30	Women's super-G
7 February	11:30	Men's super-G
8 February	11:30	Women's downhill
9 February	11:30	Men's downhill
11 February	10:00 (1st run); 13:15 (2nd run)	Women's team combined
12 February	10:00 (1st run); 13:15 (2nd run)	Men's team combined
13 February	09:45 (1st run); 13:15 (2nd run)	Women's giant slalom
14 February	09:45 (1st run); 13:15 (2nd run)	Men's giant slalom
15 February	09:45 (1st run); 13:15 (2nd run)	Women's slalom
16 February	09:45 (1st run); 13:15 (2nd run)	Men's slalom

Qualifying races

Date	Time	Discipline
12 February	10:00 (1st run); 13:00 (2nd run)	Women's giant slalom (cancelled)
13 February	10:00 (1st run); 13:00 (2nd run)	Men's giant slalom
14 February	10:00 (1st run); 13:00 (2nd run)	Women's slalom (cancelled)
15 February	10:00 (1st run); 13:00 (2nd run)	Men's slalom

== Medal summary ==
=== Medal table ===
* Host nation (Austria)

Rank	Nation	Gold	Silver	Bronze	Total
1	Switzerland	5	5	3	13
2	Austria*	2	3	2	7
3	Italy	2	1	0	3
4	United States	2	0	2	4
5	Norway	0	1	2	3
6	New Zealand	0	1	0	1
7	Czech Republic	0	0	1	1
7	Germany	0	0	1	1
7	Sweden	0	0	1	1
Totals (9 entries)		11	11	12	34

=== Men's events ===
Event	Gold		Silver		Bronze	
Downhill	Franjo von Allmen; Switzerland	1:40.68	Vincent Kriechmayr; Austria	1:40.92	Alexis Monney; Switzerland	1:40.99
Super-G	Marco Odermatt; Switzerland	1:24.57	Raphael Haaser; Austria	1:25.57	Adrian Smiseth Sejersted; Norway	1:25.72
Giant slalom	Raphael Haaser; Austria	2:39.71	Thomas Tumler; Switzerland	2:39.94	Loïc Meillard; Switzerland	2:40.22
Slalom	Loïc Meillard; Switzerland	1:54.02	Atle Lie McGrath; Norway	1:54.28	Linus Straßer; Germany	1:54.54
Team combined	Switzerland 1 Franjo von Allmen; Loïc Meillard	2:42.38	Switzerland 2 Alexis Monney; Tanguy Nef	2:42.65	Switzerland 4 Stefan Rogentin; Marc Rochat	2:42.81

=== Women's events ===
Event	Gold		Silver		Bronze	
Downhill	Breezy Johnson; United States	1:41.29	Mirjam Puchner; Austria	1:41.44	Ester Ledecká; Czech Republic	1:41.50
Super-G	Stephanie Venier; Austria	1:20.47	Federica Brignone; Italy	1:20.57	Kajsa Vickhoff Lie; Norway Lauren Macuga; United States	1:20.71
Giant slalom	Federica Brignone; Italy	2:22.71	Alice Robinson; New Zealand	2:23.61	Paula Moltzan; United States	2:25.33
Slalom	Camille Rast; Switzerland	1:58.00	Wendy Holdener; Switzerland	1:58.46	Katharina Liensberger; Austria	1:59.32
Team combined	United States 1 Breezy Johnson; Mikaela Shiffrin	2:40.89	Switzerland 1 Lara Gut-Behrami; Wendy Holdener	2:41.28	Austria 3 Stephanie Venier; Katharina Truppe	2:41.42

=== Mixed ===
Event	Gold	Silver	Bronze
Team parallel event	Italy; Giorgia Collomb; Lara Della Mea; Filippo Della Vite; Alex Vinatzer	Switzerland; Luca Aerni; Delphine Darbellay; Wendy Holdener; Thomas Tumler	Sweden; Estelle Alphand; Fabian Ax Swartz; William Hansson; Sara Hector; Kristoffer Jakobsen; Lisa Nyberg
