= 2019 Alpine Skiing World Cup – Women's giant slalom =

Alpine ski discipline year standings

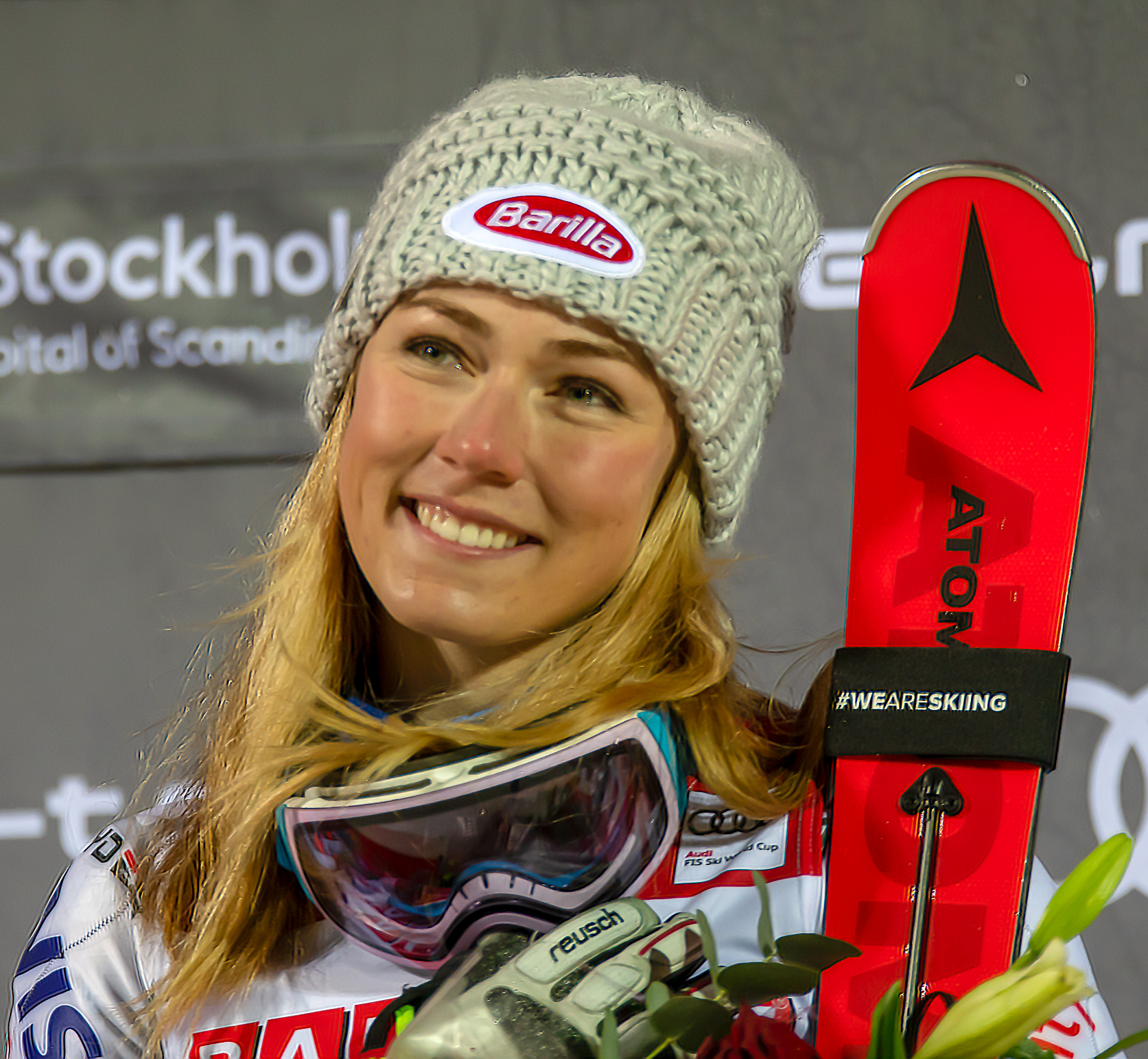
2019 Women's giant slalom World Cup: Mikaela Shiffrin of USA, season champion; 2019 Women's World Cup; Overall • downhill • Super-G; Giant Slalom • slalom • Combined
Previous: 2018	Next: 2020

The women's giant slalom in the 2019 FIS Alpine Skiing World Cup involved 8 events.

The battle for the discipline championship was waged between two skiers better known for their slalom prowess: Mikaela Shiffrin of the United States and Petra Vlhová of Slovakia. With only the World Cup finals in Soldeu on 17 March remaining, both women had posted three victories in the discipline to distance themselves from the two most recent champions in the discipline, Tessa Worley of France and Viktoria Rebensburg of Germany. But Shiffrin's two other podium finishes, which Vlhová couldn't match, had staked Shiffrin to a 97-point lead over Vlhová, which meant that all Shiffrin needed to do in the finals was finish in the top 15 (since only the top 15 score points in the finals). Instead, Shiffrin actually won the finals to decisively eliminate Vlhová, who finished third in the race.

The season was interrupted by the 2019 World Ski Championships, which were held from 4–17 February in Åre, Sweden. The women's giant slalom was held on 14 February.

== Standings ==
#	Skier	27 Oct 2018; Sölden (Austria)	24 Nov 2018; Killington (United States)	21 Dec 2018; Courchevel (France)	28 Dec 2018; Semmering (Austria)	15 Jan 2019; Kronplatz (Italy)	1 Feb 2019; Maribor (Slovenia)	8 Mar 2019; Špindlerův Mlýn (Czech Republic)	17 Mar 2019; Soldeu (Andorra)	Total
	(United States) Mikaela Shiffrin	60	50	100	45	100	100	60	100	615
2	(Slovakia) Petra Vlhová	DSQ2	36	32	100	50	100	100	60	478
3	(France) Tessa Worley	100	45	60	60	80	29	36	50	460
4	(Germany) Viktoria Rebensburg	50	DNF2	80	80	45	DNF1	80	45	380
5	(Italy) Federica Brignone	80	100	50	40	40	DNF1	50	DNF2	360
6	(Norway) Ragnhild Mowinckel	45	80	45	29	DNF2	60	18	DNS	277
7	(Switzerland) Wendy Holdener	36	40	15	24	29	50	20	40	254
8	(Austria) Stephanie Brunner	45	60	40	50	DNS				195
9	(Italy) Marta Bassino	DNF1	24	18	26	60	36	24	DNF1	188
10	(Austria) Ricarda Haaser	8	11	22	36	32	18	29	20	176
11	(Sweden) Frida Hansdotter	6	26	29	22	26	40	26	DNF1	175
12	(Austria) Katharina Liensberger	15	29	16	20	DNQ	9	12	32	133
13	(Norway) Thea Louise Stjernesund	29	18	20	14	DNQ	14	15	22	132
14	(Slovenia) Meta Hrovat	13	DNF2	DNS		36	32	45	DNS2	126
15	(Sweden) Sara Hector	DNF2	9	14	4	20	45	DNF1	29	121
16	(Norway) Kristin Lysdahl	32	14	DNF2	DNS	16	26	16	16	120
17	(Austria) Eva-Maria Brem	7	14	DNQ	DNQ	7	15	40	36	119
18	(Austria) Anna Veith	11	32	36	32	DNS				111
19	(New Zealand) Alice Robinson	DNS		DNF1	DNQ	DNF1	DNF2	15	80	95
20	(Austria) Bernadette Schild	10	DNQ	3	18	14	16	7	24	92
21	(Austria) Katharina Truppe	14	DNQ	6	11	6	22	32	DNF2	91
22	(Norway) Mina Fürst Holtmann	DNQ	DNF1	13	16	DNF1	5	22	26	82
23	(France) Adeline Baud Mugnier	22	22	26	8	DNS				78
24	(Canada) Marie-Michèle Gagnon	DNQ	20	9	2	9	24	6	0	70
	(France) Coralie Frasse Sombet	DNS		DNQ	DNQ	22	20	10	18	70
	References									

- Winner
- 2nd place
- 3rd place
- DNF1 = Did Not Finish run 1
- DSQ1 = Disqualified run 1
- DNQ = Did not qualify for run 2
- DNF2 = Did Not Finish run 2
- DSQ2 = Disqualified run 2
- DNS = Did Not Start
- Updated at 18 March 2019, after all events.

== See also ==
- 2019 Alpine Skiing World Cup – Women's summary rankings
- 2019 Alpine Skiing World Cup – Women's overall
- 2019 Alpine Skiing World Cup – Women's downhill
- 2019 Alpine Skiing World Cup – Women's super-G
- 2019 Alpine Skiing World Cup – Women's slalom
- 2019 Alpine Skiing World Cup – Women's combined
