= 2019 Alpine Skiing World Cup – Women's overall =

Alpine ski discipline year standings

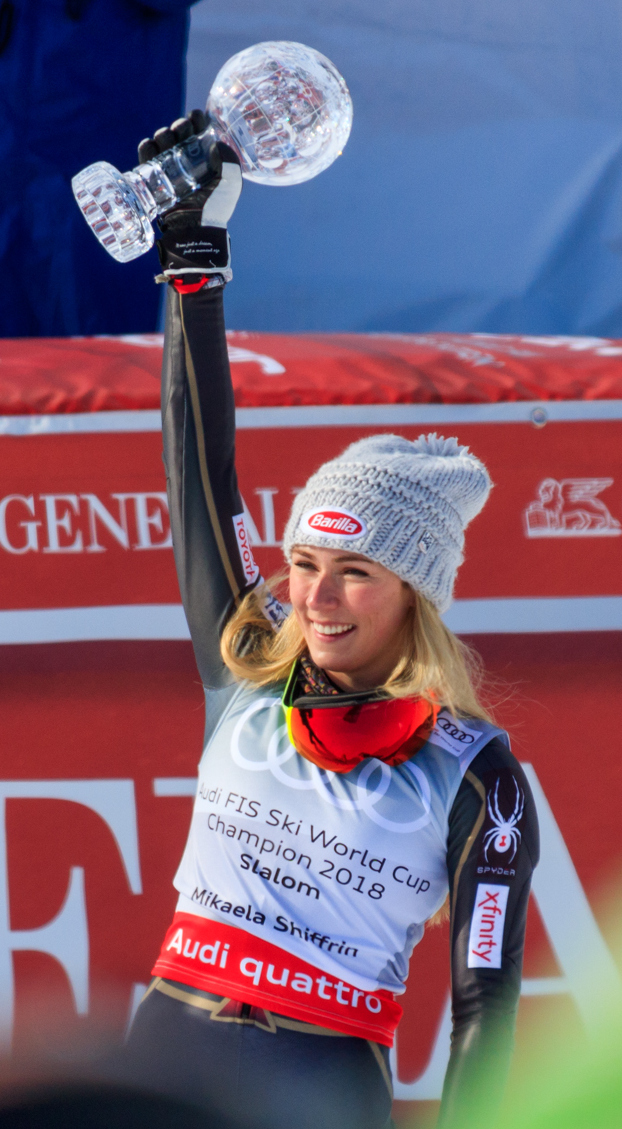
2019 women's overall World Cup: Mikaela Shiffrin of USA, champion for the third straight season; 2019 women's World Cup; Overall • downhill • super-g; giant slalom • slalom• combined
Previous: 2018	Next: 2020

The women's overall in the 2019 FIS Alpine Skiing World Cup involved 35 events in 5 disciplines: downhill (DH), Super-G (SG), giant slalom (GS), slalom (SL) [which included parallel slaloms and city events], and Alpine combined (AC). After this season, city events were discontinued, and a new parallel discipline was created for parallel slaloms and parallel giant slaloms.

The season was interrupted by the 2019 World Ski Championships, which were held from 4–17 February in Åre, Sweden.

Two-time defending champion Mikaela Shiffrin of the United States set an all-time World Cup record by winning 17 events during the season, shattering Vreni Schneider's all-time record of 14 (set back during the 1988-89 season), and also won the season championships in the disciplines of Super-G, giant slalom, and slalom (the only skier, male or female, to ever win those three disciplines and the overall championship over a single season).

The season finals were held in Soldeu, Andorra.

== Standings ==
#	Skier	DH; 8 races	SG; 6 races	GS; 8 races	SL; 12 races	AC; 1 race	Tot.
	(United States) Mikaela Shiffrin	79	350	615	1160	0	2,204
2	(Slovakia) Petra Vlhová	0	0	478	877	0	1,355
3	(Switzerland) Wendy Holdener	4	80	254	681	60	1,079
4	(Germany) Viktoria Rebensburg	177	257	380	0	0	814
5	(Austria) Nicole Schmidhofer	468	303	0	0	0	771
6	(Italy) Federica Brignone	104	165	360	35	100	764
7	(Norway) Ragnhild Mowinckel	85	247	277	40	26	675
8	(Sweden) Frida Hansdotter	0	0	175	479	0	654
9	(Austria) Stephanie Venier	372	156	0	0	0	528
10	(Slovenia) Ilka Štuhec	343	153	11	0	0	507
11	(Sweden) Anna Swenn-Larsson	0	0	0	486	0	486
12	(Austria) Katharina Liensberger	0	0	133	350	0	483
13	(Austria) Katharina Truppe	0	0	91	379	0	470
14	(France) Tessa Worley	0	0	460	0	0	460
15	(Austria) Ramona Siebenhofer	354	90	0	0	14	458
16	(Switzerland) Michelle Gisin	207	70	22	143	0	442
17	(Liechtenstein) Tina Weirather	139	268	4	0	0	411
18	(Switzerland) Corinne Suter	288	105	0	0	0	393
19	(Austria) Bernadette Schild	0	0	92	271	0	363
20	(Norway) Kristin Lysdahl	0	0	120	237	0	357
21	(Switzerland) Lara Gut-Behrami	128	178	50	0	0	356
22	(Italy) Sofia Goggia	220	116	12	0	0	348
23	(France) Romane Miradoli	169	119	17	0	36	341
24	(Austria) Ricarda Haaser	116	12	176	0	22	326
25	(Germany) Kira Weidle	307	12	0	0	0	319

- Leader
- 2nd place
- 3rd place
- Updated at 18 March 2019, after all events

== See also ==
- 2019 Alpine Skiing World Cup – Women's summary rankings
- 2019 Alpine Skiing World Cup – Women's downhill
- 2019 Alpine Skiing World Cup – Women's super-G
- 2019 Alpine Skiing World Cup – Women's giant slalom
- 2019 Alpine Skiing World Cup – Women's slalom
- 2019 Alpine Skiing World Cup – Women's combined
- 2019 Alpine Skiing World Cup – Men's overall
