= 2019 Alpine Skiing World Cup – Women's slalom =

Alpine ski discipline year standings

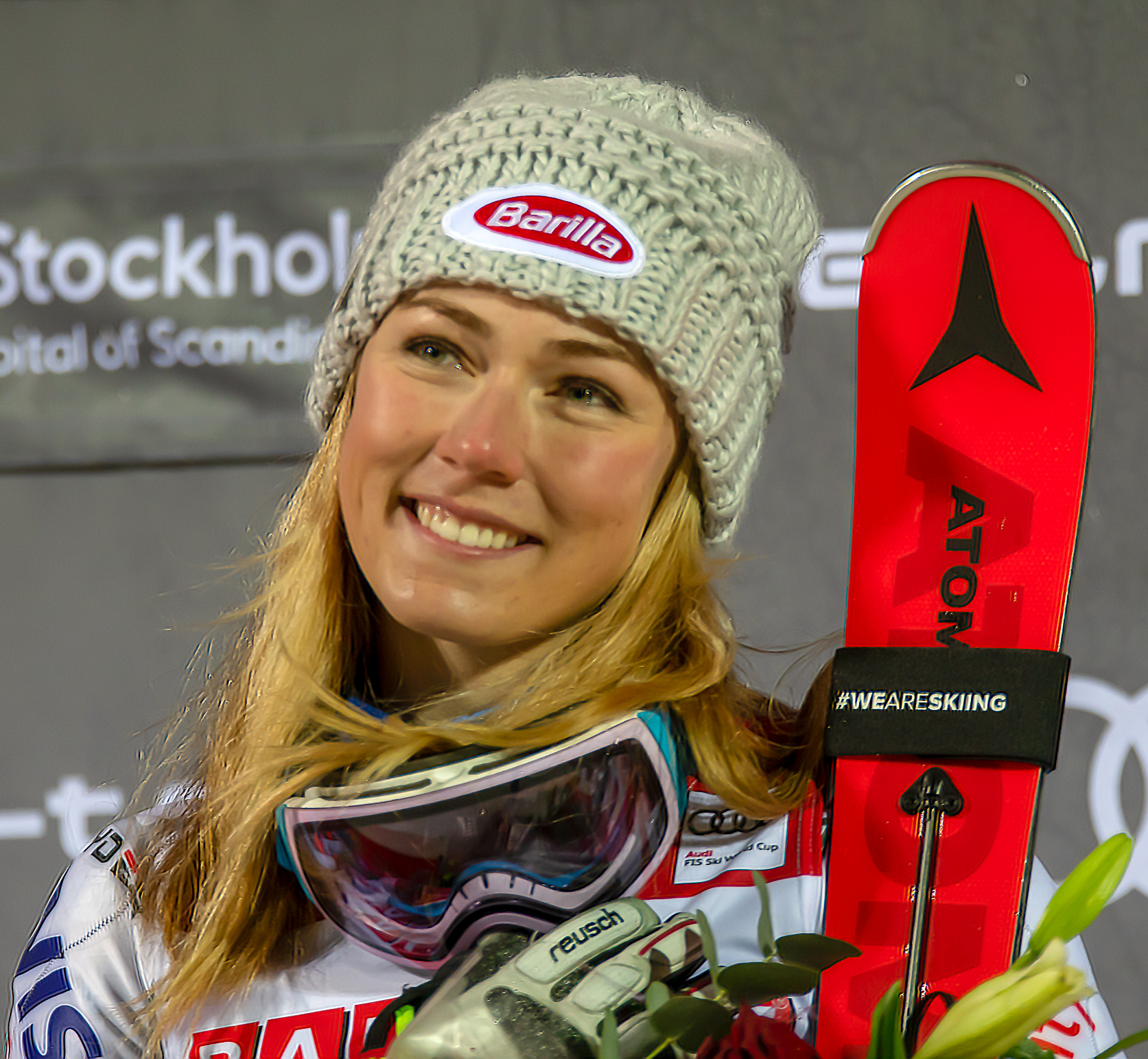
2019 Women's Slalom World Cup: Mikaela Shiffrin of the USA, season champion; 2019 Women's World Cup; Overall • downhill • super-G; giant slalom • slalom • combined
Previous: 2018	Next: 2020

The women's slalom in the 2019 FIS Alpine Skiing World Cup involved 12 events, including three parallel slaloms (one parallel slalom and two city events). At the end of the season, a new discipline was created for parallel races.

Two-time defending champion Mikaela Shiffrin from the United States won ten of the twelve races en route to winning an all-time record 17 races during the season (finishing second in the other two); this was Shiffrin's sixth discipline championship in slalom, tying the women's record for career slalom championships set by Vreni Schneider (the men's record is eight, set by Ingemar Stenmark), and she has now won 40 slaloms, tying Stenmark's total in the discipline. Shiffrin scored 1,160 points in the discipline for the season out of a possible 1,200. Runner-up Petra Vlhová of Slovakia also had an outstanding year with ten podiums (two wins, seven seconds, and a third), but she still finished almost 300 points behind Shiffrin.

The season was interrupted by the 2019 World Ski Championships, which were held from 4–17 February in Åre, Sweden. The women's slalom was held on 16 February.

== Standings ==
Parallel Slalom (PS) or City Event (CE)

#	Skier	17 November 2018; Levi (Finland)	25 November 2018; Killington (United States)	9 December 2018; St. Moritz (PS) (Switzerland)	22 December 2018; Courchevel (France)	29 December 2018; Semmering (Austria)	1 January 2019; Oslo (CE) (Norway)	5 January 2019; Zagreb (Croatia)	8 January 2019; Flachau (Austria)	2 February 2019; Maribor (Slovenia)	19 February 2019; Stockholm (CE) (Sweden)	9 March 2019; Špindlerův Mlýn (Czech Republic)	16 March 2019; Soldeu (Andorra)	Tot.
	(United States) Mikaela Shiffrin	100	100	100	100	100	80	100	80	100	100	100	100	1,160
2	(Slovakia) Petra Vlhová	80	80	80	80	80	100	80	100	45	32	60	60	877
3	(Switzerland) Wendy Holdener	45	40	60	50	60	60	60	50	60	36	80	80	681
4	(Sweden) Anna Swenn-Larsson	40	36	14	36	40	50	40	DSQ2	80	60	40	50	486
5	(Sweden) Frida Hansdotter	50	60	1	60	DNF1	32	50	45	50	50	36	45	479
6	(Austria) Katharina Truppe	15	29	26	24	45	29	26	32	29	45	50	29	379
7	(Austria) Katharina Liensberger	32	22	50	45	50	26	DNF2	60	DSQ2	29	DNF2	36	350
8	(Germany) Christina Geiger	14	DNF1	DNS	10	DNF2	36	45	40	26	80	26	DNF1	277
9	(Austria) Bernadette Schild	60	50	1	DNF2	DNF1	24	32	DNF2	40	24	DNF2	40	271
10	(Norway) Kristin Lysdahl	DNQ	15	10	26	11	DNS	12	24	36	26	45	32	237
11	(Italy) Irene Curtoni	13	24	22	18	36	40	18	DNS	4	20	6	22	223
12	(Canada) Erin Mielzynski	24	DNF1	36	32	24	45	24	DNF1	DNF1	22	DNF1	DNF1	207
13	(Canada) Laurence St. Germain	DNF2	18	9	12	26	20	16	20	14	40	DNS	20	195
14	(Switzerland) Michelle Gisin	26	45	DNS				36	36	DNS				14d
	(Italy) Chiara Costazza	12	DNF2	1	29	15	DNS	29	DNF2	32	15	10	DNF1	143
16	(Germany) Lena Dürr	DNF1	26	32	DNF1	6	18	DNQ	16	DNQ	DNS	14	24	136
17	(France) Nastasia Noens	DNQ	6	4	5	20	DNS	DNF	29	13	16	15	26	134
18	(Norway) Nina Haver-Løseth	29	16	45	40	DNF1	DNS							130
19	(Switzerland) Aline Danioth	DNQ	13	7	15	16	16	DNQ	26	10	DNS	20	DNF2	123
20	(Canada) Roni Remme	4	20	16	14	32	15	DNQ	DNF1	11	DNS			112
21	(Norway) Mina Fürst Holtmann	DNQ	DNF1	15	22	29	DNS	DSQ2	7	6	DNS	22	DNF1	101
22	(Slovenia) Meta Hrovat	22	0	6	DNS			DNF1	15	24	DNS	32	DNF1	99
23	(Austria) Katharina Gallhuber	36	32	29	DNS									97
24	(Austria) Katharina Huber	11	DNF1	5	DNQ	10	DNS	DNQ	13	24	DNS	13	DNF1	76
25	(Sweden) Charlotta Säfvenberg	DNF1	DNS		20	DSQ1	DNS	DNQ	10	18	DNS	24	0	72
	References													

- Winner
- 2nd place
- 3rd place
- DNF1 = Did Not Finish run 1
- DSQ1 = Disqualified run 1
- DNQ = Did not qualify for run 2
- DNF2 = Did Not Finish run 2
- DSQ2 = Disqualified run 2
- DNS = Did Not Start
- Updated at 18 March 2019, after all events.

== See also ==
- 2019 Alpine Skiing World Cup – Women's summary rankings
- 2019 Alpine Skiing World Cup – Women's overall
- 2019 Alpine Skiing World Cup – Women's downhill
- 2019 Alpine Skiing World Cup – Women's super-G
- 2019 Alpine Skiing World Cup – Women's giant slalom
- 2019 Alpine Skiing World Cup – Women's combined
