= 2019 Alpine Skiing World Cup – Women's super-G =

Alpine ski discipline year standings

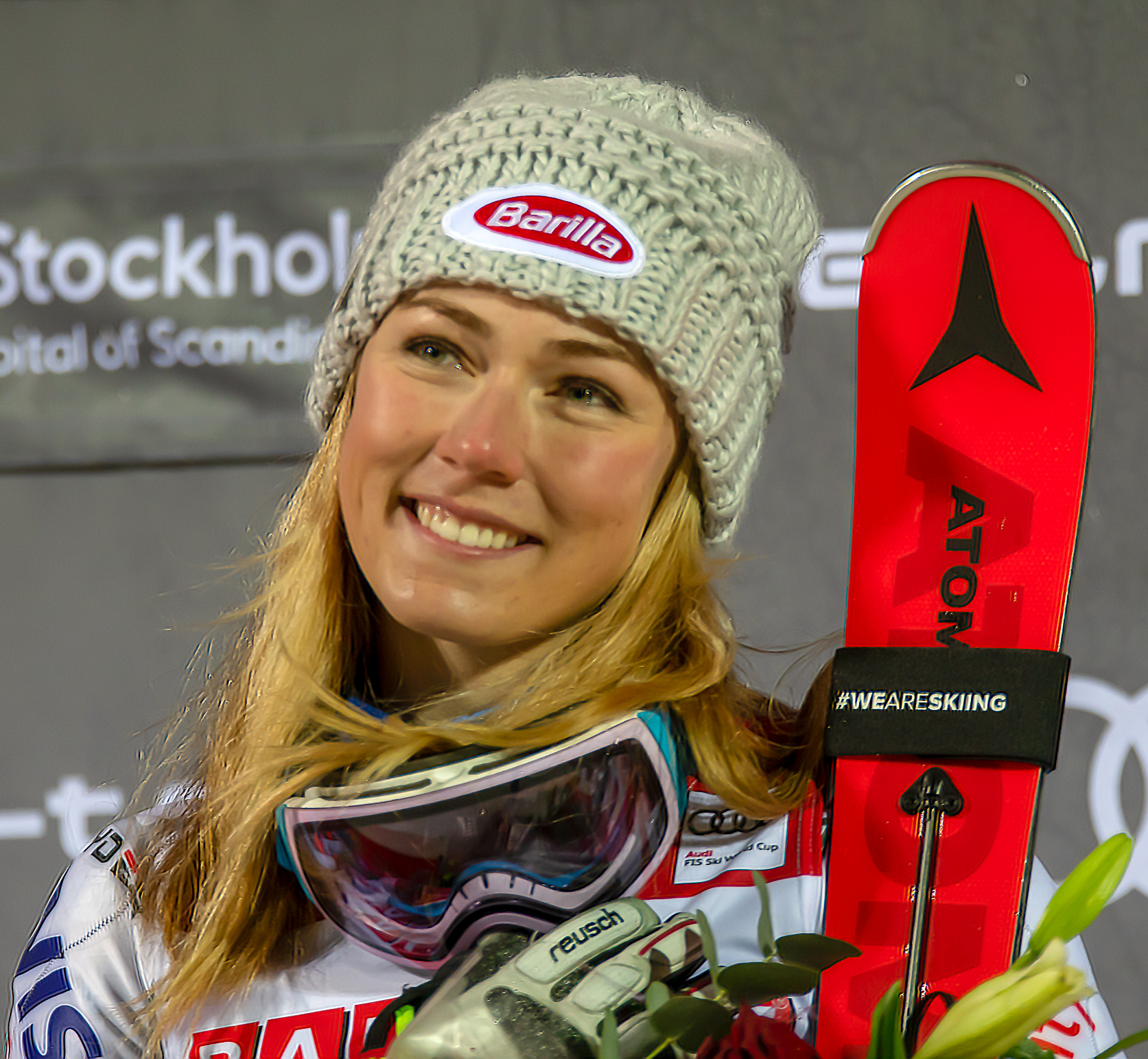
2019 Women's super-G World Cup: Mikaela Shiffrin of the USA, season champion; 2019 Women's World Cup; Overall • downhill • super-G; giant slalom • slalom • combined
Previous: 2018	Next: 2020

The women's super-G in the 2019 FIS Alpine Skiing World Cup involved 6 events, including the finals in Soldeu, Andorra. Originally, the season had been planned to hold 8 events, but the two races scheduled in Sochi, Russia were cancelled due to continuing heavy snowfall.

Mikaela Shiffrin from the United States generally specialized in the technical disciplines (slalom and giant slalom), not in the speed disciplines (downhill and super-G), but she jumped out to an early lead in Super-G by winning both of the first two races. Ultimately, Shiffrin only entered four of the six races held in the discipline (and had not entered the two cancelled races planned for Sochi), but her results in the completed races – 3 victories and a tie for fourth – were sufficient to win the discipline crystal globe for the season over two-time defending champion Tina Weirather of Liechtenstein (who needed to win the finals but did not finish). The win was Shiffrin's tenth World Cup title, but her first in a speed discipline.

The season was interrupted by the 2019 World Ski Championships, which were held from 4–17 February in Åre, Sweden. The women's super-G was held on 5 February (and was also won by Shiffrin).

== Standings ==
#	Skier	2 Dec 2018; Lake Louise (Canada)	8 Dec 2018; St. Moritz (Switzerland)	19 Dec 2018; Val Gardena/Gröden (Italy)	20 Jan 2019; Cortina d'Ampezzo (Italy)	26 Jan 2019; Garmisch (Germany)	14 Mar 2019; Soldeu (Andorra)	Total
	(United States) Mikaela Shiffrin	100	100	DNS	100	DNS	50	350
2	(Austria) Nicole Schmidhofer	24	29	80	20	100	50	303
3	(Liechtenstein) Tina Weirather	16	60	80	80	32	DNF	268
4	(Germany) Viktoria Rebensburg	60	32	36	29	DNF	100	257
5	(Norway) Ragnhild Mowinckel	80	50	45	36	36	DNS	247
6	(Austria) Tamara Tippler	1	10	22	60	10	80	183
7	(Switzerland) Lara Gut-Behrami	32	80	6	DNF	60	DNS	178
8	(Italy) Federica Brignone	22	DNF	9	24	50	60	165
9	(Austria) Stephanie Venier	29	26	32	29	20	20	156
10	(Switzerland) Jasmine Flury	5	0	50	45	14	40	154
11	(Slovenia) Ilka Štuhec	26	18	100	DNF	9	DNS	153
12	(France) Romane Miradoli	40	DNF	1	9	45	24	119
13	(Switzerland) Joana Hählen	10	36	18	16	15	22	117
14	(Italy) Sofia Goggia	DNS				80	36	116
15	(Norway) Kajsa Vickhoff Lie	8	DNF	15	36	16	32	107
16	(Switzerland) Corinne Suter	12	14	8	5	40	26	105
17	(Italy) Francesca Marsaglia	6	13	40	14	26	0	99
18	(Canada) Valérie Grenier	45	DNF	DNF	50	DNF	DNS	95
19	(Austria) Ramona Siebenhofer	50	DNF	29	DNF	11	DNF	90
20	(Italy) Nadia Fanchini	15	DNF	12	4	24	29	84
21	(Italy) Elena Curtoni	20	20	2	18	5	18	83
22	(Switzerland) Wendy Holdener	DNS	24	DNS	40	DNS	16	80
23	(Canada) Marie-Michèle Gagnon	11	40	16	10	0	0	77
24	(Switzerland) Michelle Gisin	18	45	7	DNF	DNF	DNS	70
25	(Austria) Cornelia Hütter	14	16	DNS	22	13	DNS	65
	References							

- Winner
- 2nd place
- 3rd place
- DNF = Did Not Finish
- DNS = Did Not Start
- Updated at 18 March 2019, after all events.

== See also ==
- 2019 Alpine Skiing World Cup – Women's summary rankings
- 2019 Alpine Skiing World Cup – Women's overall
- 2019 Alpine Skiing World Cup – Women's downhill
- 2019 Alpine Skiing World Cup – Women's giant slalom
- 2019 Alpine Skiing World Cup – Women's slalom
- 2019 Alpine Skiing World Cup – Women's combined
