= 2019 Alpine Skiing World Cup – Women's combined =

Alpine ski discipline year standings

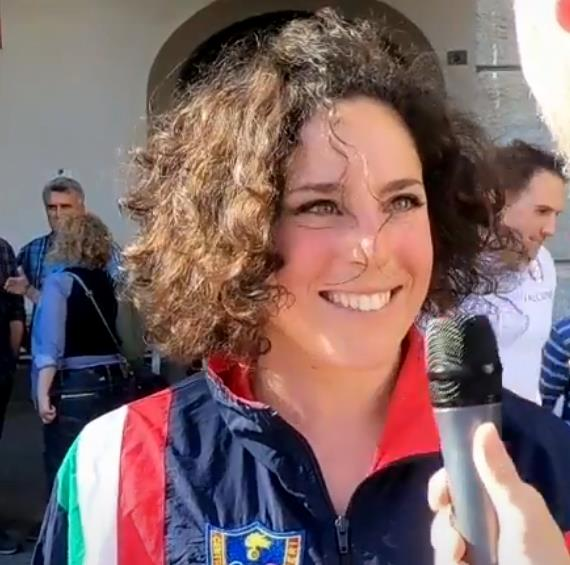
2019 Women's combined World Cup: Federica Brignone of Italy, season champion; 2019 Women's World Cup; Overall • downhill • Super-G; giant slalom • slalom • Combined
Previous: 2018	Next: 2020

The Women's Combined in the 2019 FIS Alpine Skiing World Cup involved only 1 event. Only two had been scheduled, but the first was cancelled due to unseasonably warm weather.

The one race was won by Federica Brignone of Italy, who not only won at Crans Montana for the third straight year but also won the season championship (although not a crystal globe due to only having one race in the discipline). At this time, combined races were not included in the season finals, which were held in 2019 in Soldeu, Andorra.

The season was interrupted by the 2019 World Ski Championships, which were held from 4–17 February in Åre, Sweden. The women's combined was held on 8 February.

== Standings ==
#	Skier	24 Feb 2019; Crans-Montana (Switzerland)	Tot.
1	(Italy) Federica Brignone	100	100
2	(Canada) Roni Remme	80	80
3	(Switzerland) Wendy Holdener	60	60
4	(Switzerland) Rahel Kopp	50	50
5	(Austria) Patrizia Dorsch	45	45
6	(Austria) Christina Ager	40	40
7	(France) Romane Miradoli	36	36
8	(Switzerland) Priska Nufer	32	32
9	(Italy) Marta Bassino	29	29
10	(Norway) Ragnhild Mowinckel	26	26
11	(Serbia) Nevena Ignjatović	24	24
12	(Austria) Ricarda Haaser	22	22
13	(Canada) Marie-Michèle Gagnon	20	20
14	(Austria) Franziska Gritsch	18	18
15	(Norway) Kajsa Vickhoff Lie	16	16
16	(Switzerland) Nathalie Gröbli	15	15
17	(Austria) Ramona Siebenhofer	14	14
18	(Italy) Nicol Delago	13	13
19	(Austria) Ariane Rädler	12	12
20	(Switzerland) Jasmina Suter	11	11
21	(Sweden) Lisa Hörnblad	10	10
22	(Australia) Greta Small	9	9
23	(Austria) Elisabeth Reisinger	8	8
24	(France) Tifany Roux	7	7
25	(Argentina) María Belén Simari Birkner	6	6
	References		

- Winner
- 2nd place
- 3rd place
- DNF1 = Did not finish run 1
- DNF2 = Did not finish run 2
- DNS = Did not start
- Updated at 24 February 2019, after all events.

== See also ==
- 2019 Alpine Skiing World Cup – Women's summary rankings
- 2019 Alpine Skiing World Cup – Women's overall
- 2019 Alpine Skiing World Cup – Women's downhill
- 2019 Alpine Skiing World Cup – Women's super-G
- 2019 Alpine Skiing World Cup – Women's giant slalom
- 2019 Alpine Skiing World Cup – Women's slalom
