= Lara Della Mea =

Italian alpine skier (born 1999)

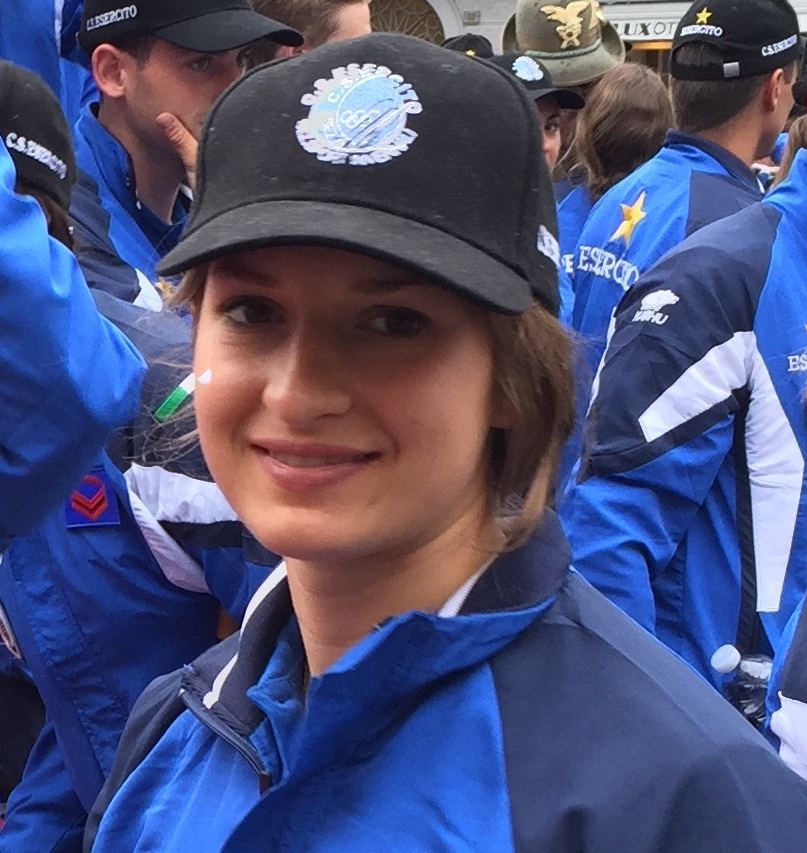
- Della Mea in 2019

Personal information
- Born: 10 January 1999 (age 27) Tarvisio, Friuli-Venezia Giulia, Italy
- Height: 1.56 m (5 ft 1 in)

Skiing career
- Country: Italy
- Sport: Alpine skiing
- Club: CS Esercito
- Disciplines: Slalom, Giant slalom
- World Cup debut: 27 October 2018 (age 19)

Olympics
- Teams: 2 – (2022, 2026)
- Medals: 0

World Championships
- Teams: 4 − (2019–2025)
- Medals: 2 (1 gold)

World Cup
- Seasons: 6 − (2019–2020, 2023–2026)
- Podiums: 0
- Overall titles: 0 – (28th in 2026)
- Discipline titles: 0 – (11th in GS, 2026)
Medal record
World Championships
Gold medal – first place	2025 Saalbach	Team event
Bronze medal – third place	2019 Åre	Team event

Lara Della Mea (born 10 January 1999) is an Italian World Cup alpine ski racer.

== Career ==
She competed at the 2019 World Championships, winning a medal in the team event. Six years later, together with teammates Giorgia Collomb, Filippo della Vite, and Alex Vinatzer, Italy won the gold medal in the team event at the 2025 World Championships in Saalbach-Hinterglemm. She has also appeared in the 2022 and 2026 Winter Olympics, where her best result was a fourth place finish in the 2026 giant slalom.

== World Cup results ==
=== Season standings ===
Season
Season	Age	Overall	Slalom	Giant slalom	Super-G	Downhill	Combined	Parallel
2019	20	90	41	—	—	—	—	—N/a
2020	21	105	42	—	—	—	—	—
2023	24	90	37	—	—	—	—N/a	
2024	25	81	40	49	—	—	—N/a	
2025	26	60	25	32	—	—	—N/a	
2026	27	28	14	11	—	—	—N/a	

=== Top-ten finishes ===
- 0 podiums, 8 top tens (6 GS, 2 SL)

Season
Season	Date	Location	Discipline	Place
2026	6 December 2025	Tremblant, Canada	Giant slalom	10th
2026	7 December 2025	Tremblant, Canada	Giant slalom	10th
2026	16 December 2025	Courchevel, France	Slalom	8th
2026	27 December 2025	Semmering, Austria	Giant slalom	7th
2026	3 January 2026	Kranjska Gora, Slovenia	Giant slalom	8th
2026	4 January 2026	Kranjska Gora, Slovenia	Slalom	6th
2026	20 January 2026	Kronplatz, Italy	Giant slalom	10th
2026	24 January 2026	(Czech Republic) Špindlerův Mlýn, Czech Republic	Giant slalom	7th

== World Championship results ==
Year
Year	Age	Slalom	Giant slalom	Super-G	Downhill	Combined	Team combined	Parallel	Team event
2019	20	DNF2	—	—	—	—	—N/a	—N/a	3
2021	22	—	—	—	—	—	—N/a	DNQ	8
2023	24	8	—	—	—	—	—N/a	DNS	8
2025	26	13	DNS2	—	—	—N/a	—	—N/a	1

== Olympic results ==
Year
Year	Age	Slalom	Giant slalom	Super-G	Downhill	Combined	Team combined	Team event
2022	23	30	—	—	—	—	—N/a	—
2026	27	13	4	—	—	—N/a	DNF1-DNS	—N/a
