= Ali Nullmeyer =

Canadian alpine skier (born 1998)

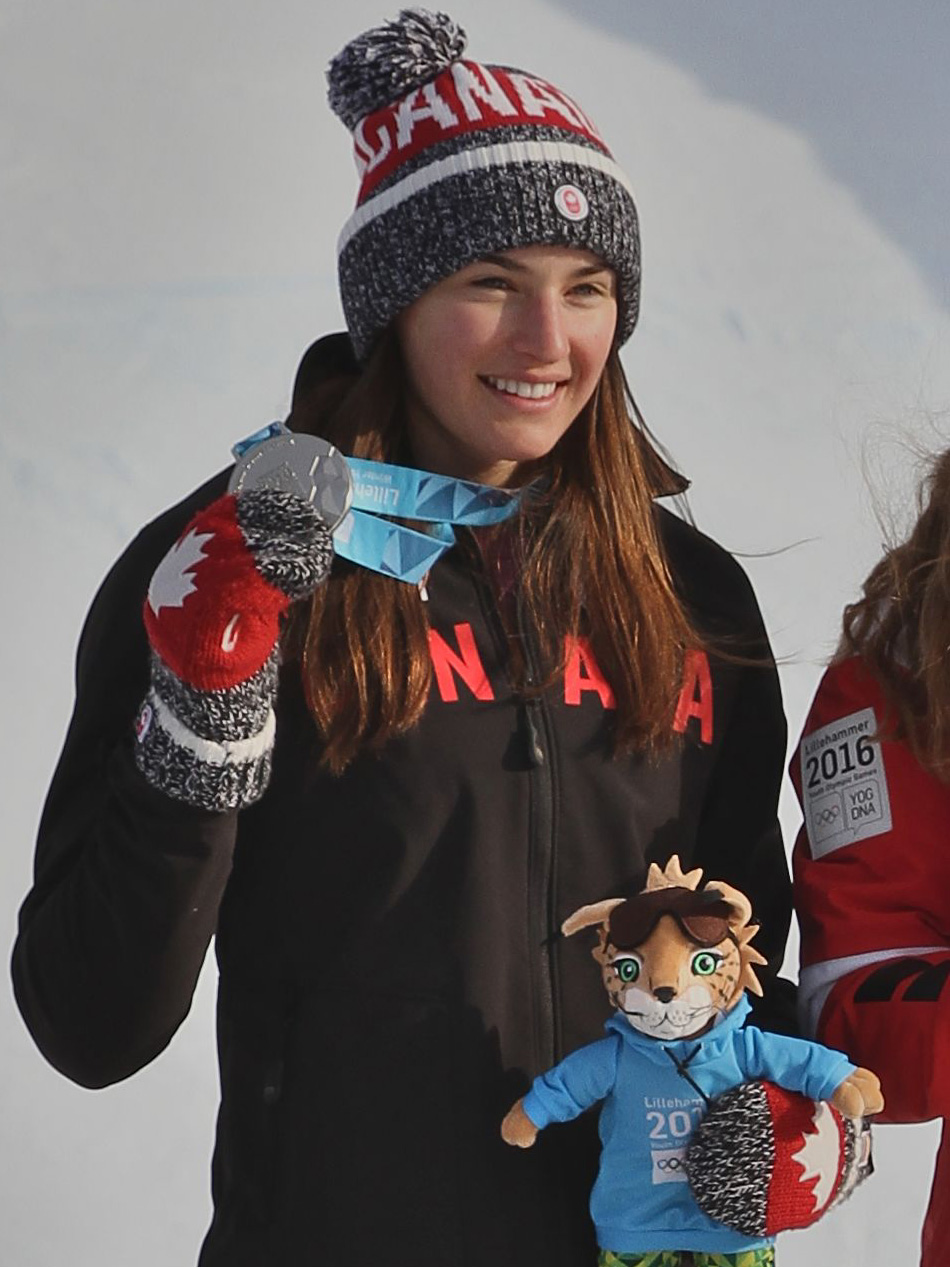
- Nullmeyer in 2016

Personal information
- Born: 21 August 1998 (age 28) Toronto, Ontario, Canada
- Height: 5 ft 8 in (173 cm)

Skiing career
- Country: Canada
- Sport: Alpine skiing
- Club: Georgian Peaks
- Disciplines: Slalom
- World Cup debut: 8 March 2019 (age 20)

Olympics
- Teams: 2 – (2022, 2026)
- Medals: 0

World Championships
- Teams: 3 – (2017, 2021, 2023)
- Medals: 0

World Cup
- Seasons: 8 - (2019-2026)
- Podiums: 0
- Overall titles: 0 – (35th in 2024)
- Discipline titles: 0 – (11th in SL; 2022, 2024)

Ali Nullmeyer (born 21 August 1998) is a Canadian World Cup alpine ski racer and specializes in slalom. At the age of 18 months, Nullmeyer started skiing with her family, racing competitively at age nine. Since then, she has skied with the Georgian Peaks Club in Collingwood, Ontario, attended grades 9–12 at Green Mountain Valley School in Vermont, and joined the Canadian Alpine Ski Team in 2015. In 2016, Nullmeyer represented Canada in the Lillehammer Winter Youth Olympic Games, where she won silver in slalom.

Nullmeyer made her World Championship debut in 2017 at St. Moritz. While training for the World Cup opener in October 2017, she fell, tearing her right and left ACLs, as well as suffering from a torn left lateral meniscus. After missing a season and a half, she returned to competing in January 2019, and made her World Cup debut that March.

In January 2022, Nullmeyer was named to Canada's 2022 Olympic team.

== World Cup results ==
=== Season standings ===
Season
Season	Age	Overall	Slalom	Giant slalom	Super-G	Downhill	Combined
2020	21	96	33	—	—	—	—
2021	22	73	29	—	—	—	—N/a
2022	23	45	11	—	—	—	—N/a
2023	24	51	17	—	—	—	—N/a
2024	25	35	11	—	—	—	—N/a
2025	26	62	22	—	—	—	—N/a
2026	27	111	48	—	—	—	—N/a

Standings through 10 February 2026

=== Top ten finishes ===
- 0 podiums
- 8 top tens (8 SL)

Season
Season	Date	Location	Discipline	Place
2022	4 Jan 2022	Zagreb, Croatia	Slalom	5th
2022	9 Jan 2022	Kranjska Gora, Slovenia	Slalom	6th
2022	19 Mar 2022	Méribel, France	Slalom	6th
2024	11 Nov 2023	Levi, Finland	Slalom	6th
2024	12 Nov 2023	Levi, Finland	Slalom	6th
2024	11 Feb 2024	Soldeu, Andorra	Slalom	7th
2024	16 Mar 2024	Saalbach, Austria	Slalom	7th
2025	27 Mar 2025	(United States) Sun Valley, USA	Slalom	9th

== World Championship results ==
Year
Year	Age	Slalom	Giant slalom	Super-G	Downhill	Combined
2017	18	27	—	—	—	—
2021	22	24	—	—	—	—
2023	24	12	—	—	—	—

== Olympic results ==
Year
Year	Age	Slalom	Giant slalom	Super-G	Downhill	Combined	Team combined	Team event
2022	23	21	—	—	—	—	—N/a	—
2026	27	16	—	—	—	—N/a	DSQ2	—N/a
