= Aline Danioth =

Swiss alpine skier (born 1998)

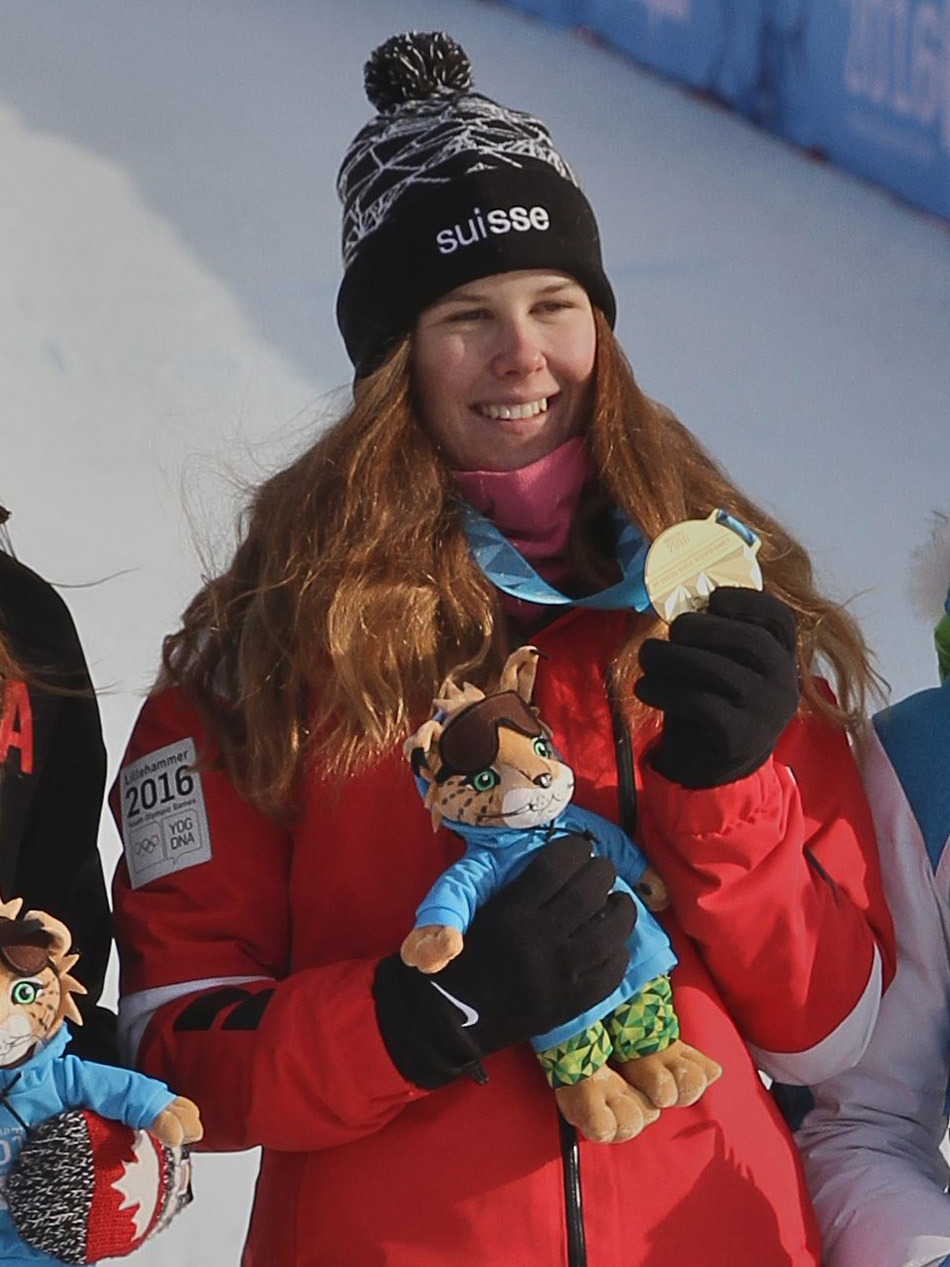
- February 2016

Personal information
- Born: 12 March 1998 (age 28)
- Height: 1.73 m (5 ft 8 in)
- Website: alinedanioth.ch

Skiing career
- Country: Switzerland
- Sport: Alpine skiing
- Club: Andermatt
- Disciplines: Slalom, giant slalom
- World Cup debut: 20 December 2015 (age 17)

Olympics
- Teams: 1 – (2022)
- Medals: 0

World Championships
- Teams: 2 − (2019, 2023)
- Medals: 1 (1 gold)

World Cup
- Seasons: 7 − (2016-2020, 2022-2023, 2025-2026)
- Podiums: 0
- Overall titles: 0 – (39th in 2020)
- Discipline titles: 0 – (12th in SL & PAR, 2020)
Medal record
Women's alpine skiing
Representing Switzerland
World Championships
Gold medal – first place	2019 Åre	Team event

Aline Danioth (born 12 March 1998) is a Swiss World Cup alpine ski racer.

She competed at the World Championships in 2019, winning a gold medal in the team event, and was fifteenth in the slalom. At the 2022 Winter Olympics she came 10th in the slalom.

== World Cup results ==
=== Season standings ===
Season
Season	Age	Overall	Slalom	Giant slalom	Super-G	Downhill	Combined	Parallel
2018	19	81	35	41	—	—	—	—N/a
2019	20	55	18	—	—	—	—	—N/a
2020	21	39	12	47	—	—	—	12
2021	22	did not compete						
2022	23	96	35	—	—	—	—N/a	—
2023	24	73	31	—	—	—	—N/a	—N/a
2024	25	did not compete					—N/a	—N/a
2025	26	115	52	—	—	—	—N/a	—N/a
2026	27	97	37	—	—	—	—N/a	—N/a

Standings through 31 January 2026

=== Top ten finishes ===
- 0 podiums, 3 top tens

Season
Season	Date	Location	Discipline	Place
2019	8 January 2019	Flachau, Austria	Slalom	10th
2020	29 December 2019	Lienz, Austria	Slalom	7th
2020	4 January 2020	Zagreb, Croatia	Slalom	8th

== World Championship results ==
Year
Year	Age	Slalom	Giant slalom	Super-G	Downhill	Combined	Team event
2019	20	15	—	—	—	—	1

== Olympic results ==
Year
Year	Age	Slalom	Giant; Slalom	Super-G	Downhill	Combined	Team event
2022	23	10	—	—	—	—	—
