= Amelia Smart =

Canadian alpine skier (born 1998)

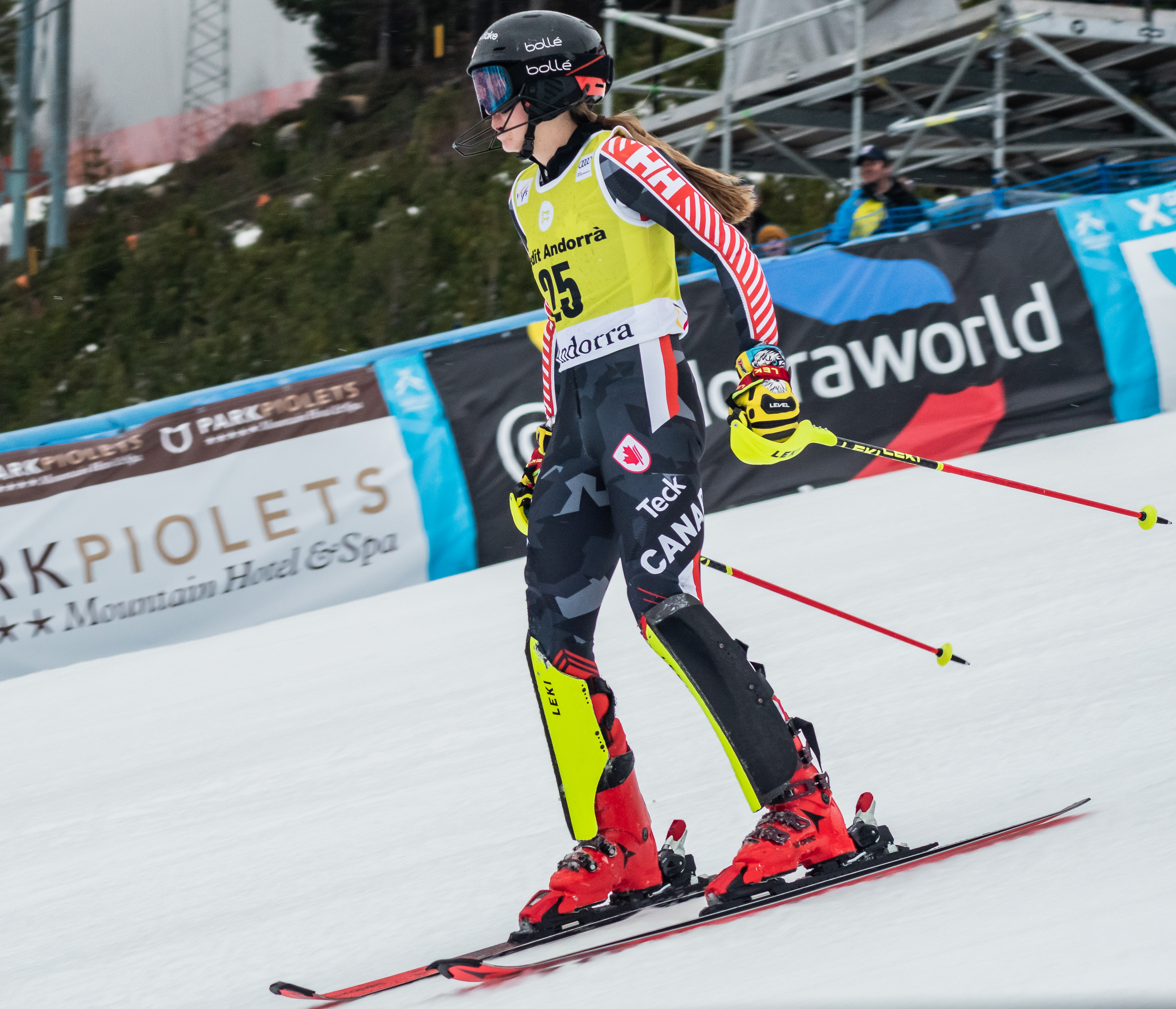
- Smart in 2023

Personal information
- Born: 8 January 1998 (age 28) North Vancouver, British Columbia, Canada
- Height: 5 ft 6 in (168 cm)

Skiing career
- Country: Canada
- Sport: Alpine skiing
- Club: Windermere
- Disciplines: Slalom
- World Cup debut: 25 November 2017 (age 19)

Olympics
- Teams: 2 – (2022, 2026)
- Medals: 0

World Championships
- Teams: 4 – (2019–2025)
- Medals: 0

World Cup
- Seasons: 9 – (2018–2026)
- Podiums: 0
- Overall titles: 0 – (56th in 2023)
- Discipline titles: 0 – (21st in SL, 2022)

Amelia Smart (born 8 January 1998) is a Canadian World Cup alpine ski racer.

== Career ==
=== Junior ===
Smart was part of Canada's team at the 2016 Winter Youth Olympics, where she competed in four events. Smart's best placement was an 8th-place finish in the combined event.

At the World Junior Alpine Skiing Championships 2019 in Italy, Smart had a career best 7th-place finish in the slalom event.

=== Senior ===
At Smart's first World Championships in 2021, Smart finished in 27th in the slalom event. In June 2021, Smart was named to Canada's national team for the 2021–22 season.

On January 21, 2022, Smart was named to Canada's 2022 Olympic team. She joined Team Canada again four years later for the 2026 Milano Cortina Olympics. She achieved a 27th place finish in both the 2022 and 2026 slalom events.

== World Cup results ==
=== Season standings ===
Season
Season	Age	Overall	Slalom	Giant slalom	Super-G	Downhill	Combined
2018	20	134	59	—	—	—	—
2019	21	134	57	—	—	—	—
2020	22	105	40	—	—	—	—
2021	23	108	45	—	—	—	—N/a
2022	24	59	21	—	—	—	—N/a
2023	25	56	22	—	—	—	—N/a
2024	26	74	32	—	—	—	—N/a
2025	27	88	35	—	—	—	—N/a
2026	28	104	41	—	—	—	—N/a

Standings through 18 February 2026

=== Top ten finishes ===
- 0 podiums; 3 top tens

Season
Season	Date	Location	Discipline	Place
2022	11 Jan 2022	Schladming, Austria	Slalom	9th
2022	19 Mar 2022	Méribel, France	Slalom	9th
2023	4 Jan 2023	Zagreb, Croatia	Slalom	8th

== World Championship results ==
Year
Year	Age	Slalom	Giant slalom	Super-G	Downhill	Combined
2019	21	22	—	—	—	—
2021	23	27	—	—	—	—
2023	25	24	—	—	—	—
2025	27	DNF1	—	—	—	—N/a

== Olympic results ==
Year
Year	Age	Slalom	Giant slalom	Super-G	Downhill	Combined	Team combined	Team event
2022	24	27	—	—	—	—	—N/a	—
2026	28	27	—	—	—	—N/a	—	—N/a
