= Laura Gauché =

French alpine skier (born 1995)

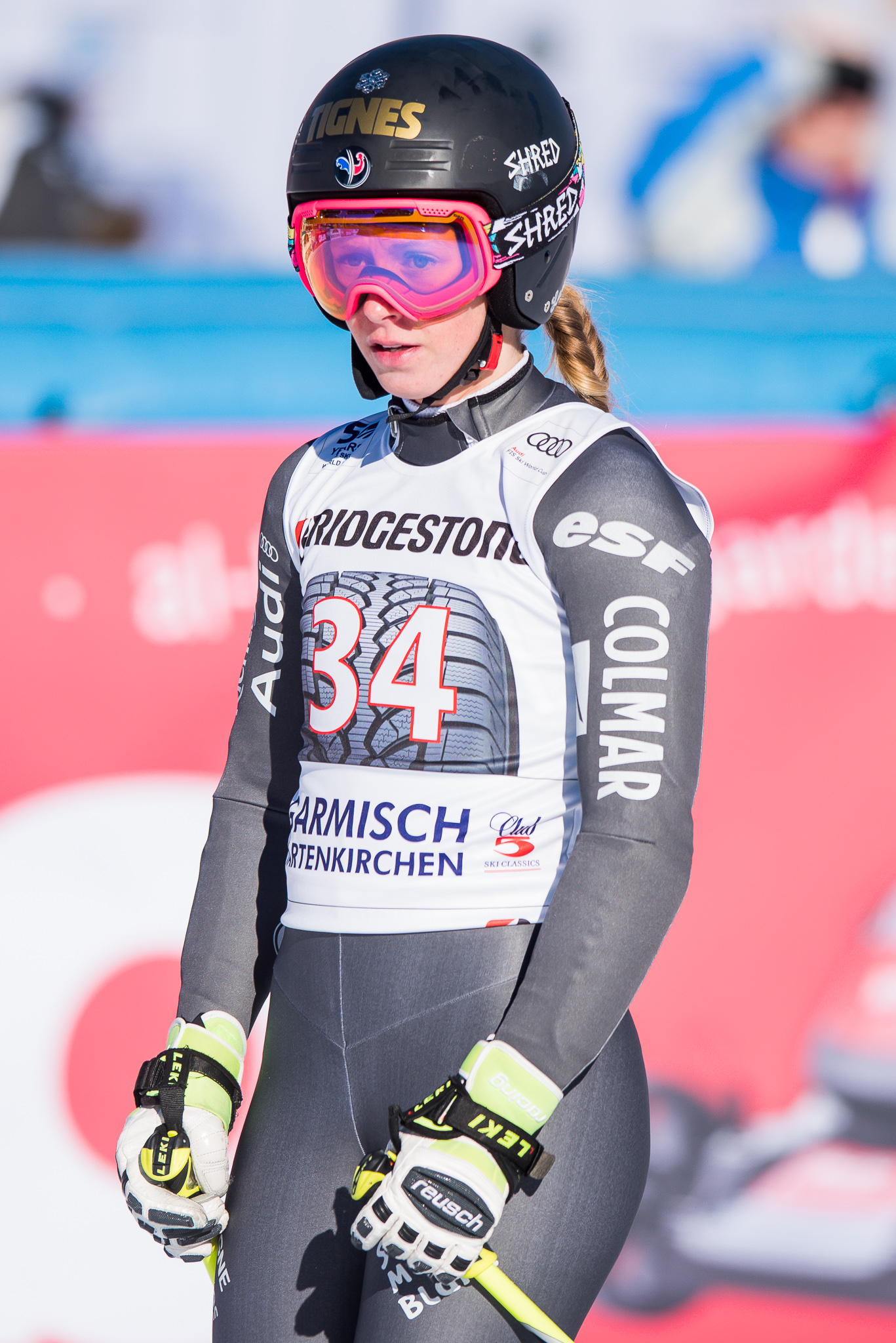
- Gauché in January 2017

Personal information
- Born: 4 March 1995 (age 31) Moûtiers, Savoie, France
- Height: 163 cm (5 ft 4 in)

Skiing career
- Country: France
- Sport: Alpine skiing
- Disciplines: Downhill, super-G, combined, giant slalom
- World Cup debut: 11 January 2014 (age 18)

Olympics
- Teams: 3 – (2018, 2022, 2026)
- Medals: 0

World Championships
- Teams: 3 – (2021, 2023, 2025)
- Medals: 0

World Cup
- Seasons: 13 − (2014–2026)
- Wins: 0
- Podiums: 1 – (1 DH)
- Overall titles: 0 – (30th in 2024)
- Discipline titles: 0 – (15th in SG, 2026)

Laura Gauché (French pronunciation: [loʁa ɡoʃe]; born 4 March 1995) is a French World Cup alpine ski racer who specializes in the speed events of downhill and super-G. She made her World Cup debut in January 2014 and has competed in three Winter Olympics and three World Championships.

== Career ==
At the Winter Olympics in 2018, Gauché finished 22nd in the downhill and twelfth in the combined. Her first World Cup podium came in February 2023 in a downhill at Crans-Montana, Switzerland.

== Personal life ==
Born in Moûtiers, Savoie, Gauché was a student at Middle School Saint Exupery in Bourg-Saint-Maurice, France, and attended High School Jean Moulin in Albertville. In 2017, she obtained a two-year diploma in marketing techniques from Annecy University Institutes of Technology.

== World Cup results ==
=== Season standings ===
Season
Season	Age	Overall	Slalom	Giant slalom	Super-G	Downhill	Combined
2017	21	102	—	—	47	—	45
2018	22	65	—	—	30	36	25
2019	23	100	—	—	38	43	—
2020	24	97	—	—	47	—	26
2021	25	60	—	—	26	35	—N/a
2022	26	37	—	—	19	28	—N/a
2023	27	36	—	—	22	18	—N/a
2024	28	30	—	—	18	17	—N/a
2025	29	49	—	—	26	24	—N/a
2026	30	42	—	—	15	33	—N/a

=== Top-ten finishes ===
- 0 wins
- 1 podium (1 DH); 14 top tens (8 SG, 6 DH)

Season
Season	Date	Location	Discipline	Place
2022	16 January 2022	Zauchensee, Austria	Super-G	5th
2022	5 March 2022	Lenzerheide, Switzerland	Super-G	9th
2022	17 March 2022	Courchevel, France	Super-G	8th
2023	14 January 2023	St Anton, Austria	Super-G	10th
2023	20 January 2023	Cortina d'Ampezzo, Italy	Downhill	7th
2023	26 February 2023	Crans-Montana, Switzerland	Downhill	3rd
2023	15 March 2023	Soldeu, Andorra	Downhill	9th
2024	13 January 2024	Zauchensee, Austria	Downhill	9th
2024	14 January 2024	Zauchensee, Austria	Super-G	7th
2024	27 January 2024	Cortina d'Ampezzo, Italy	Downhill	4th
2024	17 February 2024	Crans-Montana, Switzerland	Downhill	9th
2024	18 February 2024	Crans-Montana, Switzerland	Super-G	10th
2026	14 December 2025	St. Moritz, Switzerland	Super-G	5th
2026	28 February 2026	Soldeu, Andorra	Super-G	9th

== World Championship results ==
Year
Year	Age	Slalom	Giant slalom	Super-G	Downhill	Combined	Team combined
2021	25	—	—	26	20	7	—N/a
2023	27	—	—	14	12	7	—N/a
2025	29	—	—	13	20	—N/a	13

== Olympic results ==
Year
Year	Age	Slalom	Giant slalom	Super-G	Downhill	Combined	Team combined
2018	22	—	—	—	22	12	—N/a
2022	26	—	—	16	10	8	—N/a
2026	30	—	—	12	13	—N/a	8
