= Jasmina Suter =

Swiss alpine skier (born 1995)

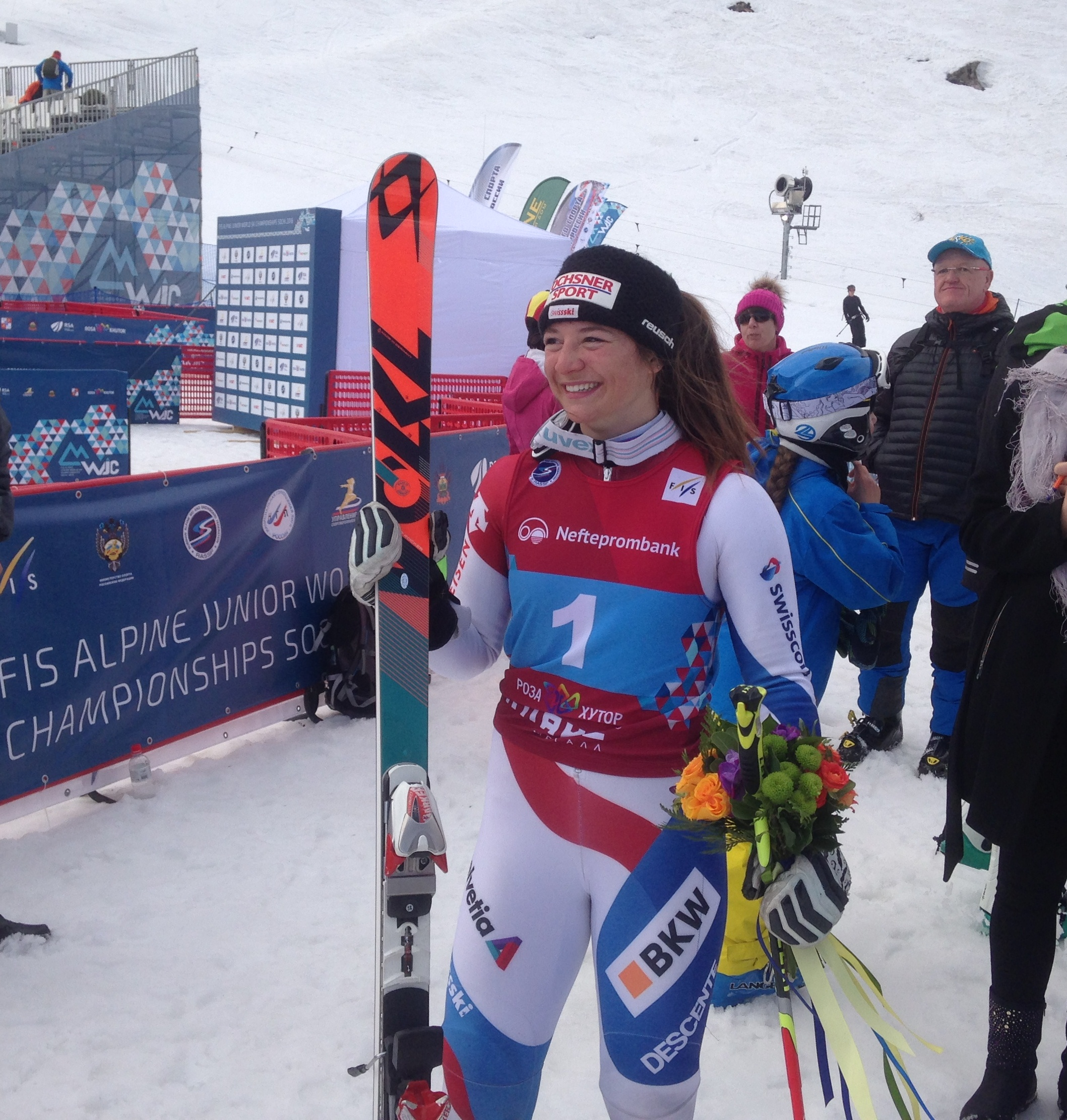
- Suter in 2016

Personal information
- Born: 16 April 1995 (age 31) Switzerland
- Website: https://suter-sisters.ch/

Skiing career
- Country: Switzerland
- Sport: Alpine skiing ♀
- Club: Stoos
- Disciplines: Downhill, Super G, Giant slalom, Combined
- World Cup debut: 9 March 2013 (age 17)

World Championships
- Teams: 2 – (2017, 2021)
- Medals: 0

World Cup
- Seasons: 12 – (2013–2014, 2016–2022, 2024–2026)
- Podiums: 0
- Overall titles: 0 – (45th in 2021)
- Discipline titles: 0 – (20th in AC, 2019)
Medal record
Women's alpine skiing
Representing Switzerland
Junior World Championships
Gold medal – first place	2016 Sochi	Giant slalom
Bronze medal – third place	2013 Roccaraso	Team event
Youth Olympics
Bronze medal – third place	2012 Innsbruck	Giant slalom

Jasmina Suter (born 16 April 1995) is a Swiss World Cup alpine ski racer. She won the 2016 Junior World Championship in giant slalom and was selected for Switzerland's senior World Championships team in 2017 and 2021. In January 2025 she suffered a knee injury and did not race the rest of the season.

== World Cup results ==
=== Season standings ===
Season
Season	Age	Overall	Slalom	Giant; Slalom	Super-G	Downhill	Combined	Parallel
2016	20	105	—	45	—	—	—	—N/a
2017	21	100	—	—	48	—	42	—N/a
2018	22	no World Cup points earned						—N/a
2019	23	91	—	49	40	—	20	—N/a
2020	24	94	—	—	51	51	23	—
2021	25	45	—	—	24	22	—N/a	24
2022	26	66	—	—	28	40	—N/a	27
2023	27	did not compete					—N/a	—N/a
2024	28	66	—	45	25	46	—N/a	—N/a
2025	29	84	—	—	36	36	—N/a	—N/a
2026	30	77	—	—	28	39	—N/a	—N/a

=== Top ten finishes ===
- 0 podiums, 2 top tens

Season
Season	Date	Location	Discipline	Place
2021	23 January 2021	Crans-Montana, Switzerland	Downhill	6th
2022	30 January 2022	Garmisch-Partenkirchen, Germany	Super-G	7th

== World Championship results ==
Season
Season	Age	Slalom	Giant; Slalom	Super-G	Downhill	Combined	Parallel
2017	21	—	DNF	—	—	—	—N/a
2021	25	—	DNF1	—	18	DNF2	DNQ
