= Nina Ortlieb =

Austrian alpine skier (born 1996)

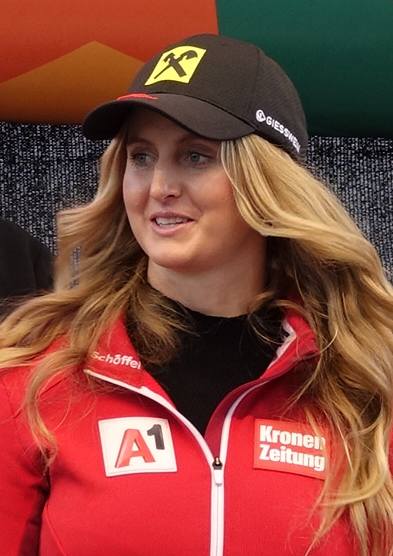
- Nina Ortlieb in 2023

Personal information
- Born: 2 April 1996 (age 30) Innsbruck, Tyrol, Austria
- Height: 1.78 m (5 ft 10 in)
- Parent: Patrick Ortlieb (father)

Skiing career
- Country: Austria
- Sport: Alpine skiing
- Disciplines: Downhill, super-G, giant slalom
- World Cup debut: 12 January 2014 (age 17)

Olympics
- Teams: 1 – (2026)
- Medals: 0

World Championships
- Teams: 1 – (2023)
- Medals: 1 (0 gold)

World Cup
- Seasons: 10 − (2014, 2016–2021, 2023, 2025–2026)
- Wins: 2 – (2 SG)
- Podiums: 5 – (3 DH, 2 SG)
- Overall titles: 0 – (12th in 2020)
- Discipline titles: 0 – (6th in SG, 2020)
Medal record
Women's alpine skiing
Representing Austria
World Cup race podiums
Event	1st	2nd	3rd
Super-G	2	0	0
Downhill	0	2	1
Total	2	2	1
International competitions
Event	1st	2nd	3rd
Olympic Games	0	0	0
World Championships	0	1	0
Total	0	1	0
World Championships
Silver medal – second place	2023 Méribel	Downhill
Junior World Championships
Gold medal – first place	2016 Sochi	Super-G
Gold medal – first place	2015 Hafjell	Giant slalom

Nina Ortlieb (born 2 April 1996) is an Austrian World Cup alpine ski racer, and specializes in the speed events of downhill and super-G. She is the daughter of Patrick Ortlieb, the Olympic gold medalist in downhill in 1992 and world champion in 1996.

== Career ==
Ortlieb attended the Stams ski high school and won a total of four Austrian student championship titles between 2009 and 2011. In December 2011, after reaching the age limit, she competed in her first FIS races and took part in a Europa Cup race for the first time on 16 January 2013 at the downhill in St. Anton, where she was immediately classified among the top ten, finishing seventh. At the end of February 2013, Ortlieb was part of the Austrian squad for the Junior World Championships in Quebec. After two retirements in slalom and super-G, she finished twelfth in the downhill. At the end of the season, she became Austrian Junior Champion in the downhill in April 2013.

For the 2013/14 season, she was accepted into the C squad of the Austrian Ski Federation and has been competing regularly in the European Cup since this winter. On 18 December 2013, she achieved the first two podium finishes in this race series when she finished third in both downhill and super-G in St. Moritz. On 12 January 2014 she made her World Cup debut in the Super Combination in Altenmarkt-Zauchensee, but retired in Super-G. On 6 February 2014, she tore her cruciate ligament during training and had to end the season early.

The following winter she was able to continue her old level of performance, achieved two more podium places in the European Cup and won the gold medal in giant slalom at the Junior World Championships in Hafjell on 7 March 2015. At the Junior World Championships in Sochi/Rosa Chutor in 2016 she won the title in Super-G. As junior world champion she was eligible to start at the world cup final in St. Moritz, where she scored her first world cup points as eleventh-placed in the super-G. In the 2016/17 World Cup season, on the other hand, she was never able to gain points, which is why she was increasingly used in the European Cup. In winter 2017/18 she won the overall European Cup ranking.

At the beginning of the 2019/20 season, Ortlieb finished fourth behind the Czech surprise winner Ester Ledecká at the World Cup downhill in Lake Louise in December 2019. After three further placings among the top ten over the course of the winter, she achieved her first World Cup podium finish on 22 February with third place in the downhill of Crans-Montana. A week later she won her first World Cup race in the super-G in La Thuile.

== World Cup results ==
=== Season standings ===
Season
Season	Age	Overall	Slalom	Giant slalom	Super G	Downhill	Combined	Parallel
2016	19	95	—	—	34	—	—	—N/a
2018	21	100	—	—	51	41	—	—N/a
2019	22	71	—	—	35	33	28	—N/a
2020	23	12	—	—	6	8	9	—
2021	24	61	—	—	45	23	—N/a	—
2023	26	20	—	—	20	9	—N/a	—N/a
2025	28	75	—	—	50	30	—N/a	—N/a
2026	29	24	—	—	20	9	—N/a	—N/a

=== Race podiums ===
- 2 wins (2 SG)
- 5 podiums (3 DH, 2 SG), 19 top tens (14 DH, 5 SG)

Season
Season	Date	Location	Discipline	Place
2020	22 February 2020	Crans-Montana, Switzerland	Downhill	3rd
2020	29 February 2020	La Thuile, Italy	Super-G	1st
2023	3 December 2022	Lake Louise, Canada	Downhill	2nd
2023	5 March 2023	Kvitfjell, Norway	Super-G	1st
2026	27 February 2026	Soldeu, Andorra	Downhill	2nd

== World Championship results ==
Year
Year	Age	Slalom	Giant slalom	Super-G	Downhill	Team combined	Parallel	Team event
2023	26	—	—	—	2	—	—	—

== Olympic results ==
Year
Year	Age	Slalom	Giant slalom	Super-G	Downhill	Team combined
2026	29	—	—	DNF	DNF	7

== Europa Cup results ==
Ortlieb has won an overall Europa Cup.

- FIS Alpine Ski Europa Cup
  - Overall: 2018
