= Joana Hählen =

Swiss alpine skier

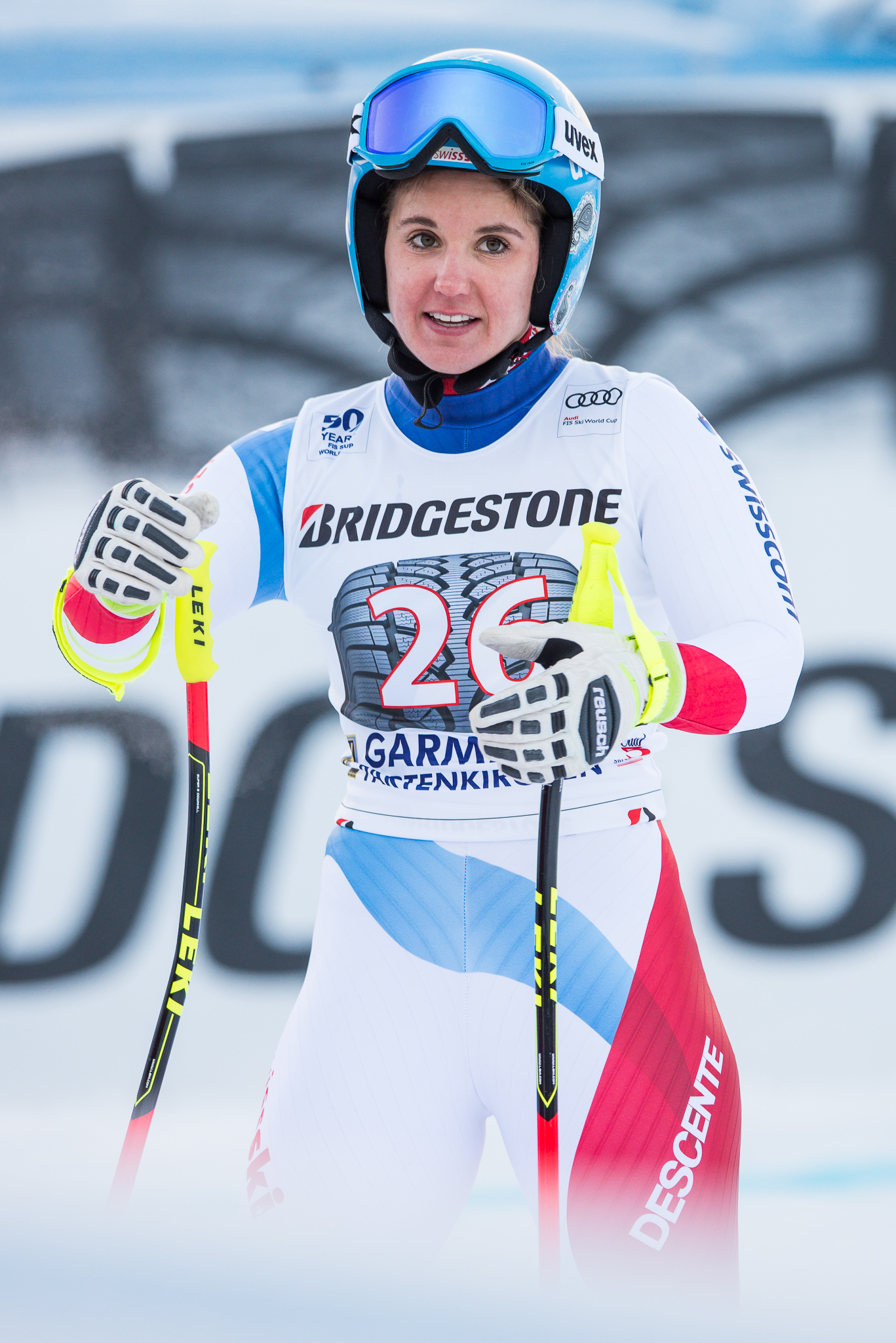
- January 2017

Personal information
- Born: 23 January 1992 (age 34) Belp, Bern, Switzerland
- Height: 1.56 m (5 ft 1 in)
- Website: joanahaehlen.ch

Skiing career
- Country: Switzerland
- Sport: Alpine skiing
- Club: Lenk I.S.
- Retired: 8 March 2026 (age 34)
- Disciplines: Downhill, Super-G
- World Cup debut: 29 November 2013 (age 21)

Olympics
- Teams: 1 – (2022)
- Medals: 0

World Championships
- Teams: 3 – (2017, 2019, 2023)
- Medals: 0

World Cup
- Seasons: 12 – (2014, 2016–2026)
- Wins: 0
- Podiums: 5 – (3 DH, 2 SG)
- Overall titles: 0 – (21st in 2020)
- Discipline titles: 0 – (13th in SG, 2019 & 2020)
Medal record
Women's alpine skiing
Representing Switzerland
Junior World Championships
Silver medal – second place	2012 Roccaraso	Super-G
Bronze medal – third place	2011 Crans-Montana	Combined

Joana Hählen (born 23 January 1992) is a Swiss World Cup alpine ski racer, specializing in the speed events of downhill and super-G.

Born in Belp in the canton of Bern, Hählen made her World Cup debut in November 2013, gained her first podium in February 2019, and has competed in two World Championships.

== Biography ==
Joana Hählen believed she would reach her first World Cup podium when she finished second in the Crans Montana downhill on 23 February 2019, 49/100ths of a second behind Sofia Goggia, but due to several timing errors during the race, she was finally placed fourth a few days later. In the following season, on 24 January 2020, she finally got her first podium, finishing third in the first run in Bansko behind Mikaela Shiffrin and Federica Brignone. A week later she achieved a second podium, her last to date, at the super-G in Rosa Khutor.

During the Garmisch downhill in January 2022, she achieved intermediate times that allowed her to think she would join her compatriots Corinne Suter and Jasmine Flury on the podium, but she made an incomprehensible mistake in the last meters of the course and only finished in 8th place.

She was part of the Swiss team that went to Beijing for the Olympic Games, but had to go through internal selections on site to obtain the right to compete for the first time in an Olympic event. She was not selected for the super-G but, by achieving the best time in the last training session, she won her place for the downhill, which she finished in 6th place.

Hählen retired from competitive racing following the 2025–26 World Cup season.

== World Cup results ==
=== Season standings ===
Season
Season	Age	Overall	Slalom	Giant slalom	Super-G	Downhill	Combined
2014	22	97	—	—	—	38	—
2015	23	out for season					
2016	24	68	—	—	33	28	49
2017	25	62	—	—	23	38	36
2018	26	39	—	—	14	33	—
2019	27	34	—	—	13	16	—
2020	28	21	—	—	13	14	14
2021	29	48	—	—	21	26	—N/a
2022	30	24	—	—	18	13	—N/a
2023	31	24	—	—	13	13	—N/a
2024	32	39	—	—	21	20	—N/a
2025	33	65	—	—	23	42	—N/a
2026	34	85	—	—	29	44	—N/a

=== Race podiums ===
- 0 wins
- 5 podiums – (3 DH, 2 SG); 27 top tens

Season
Season	Date	Location	Discipline	Place
2020	24 January 2020	Bansko, Bulgaria	Downhill	3rd
2020	2 February 2020	Rosa Khutor, Russia	Super-G	3rd
2022	16 March 2022	Courchevel, France	Downhill	2nd
2023	14 January 2023	St Anton, Austria	Super-G	2nd
2024	16 December 2023	Val-d'Isère, France	Downhill	2nd

== World Championship results ==
Year
Year	Age	Slalom	Giant slalom	Super-G	Downhill	Combined
2017	25	—	—	13	—	—
2019	27	—	—	—	16	DNS2
2023	31	—	—	13	17	—

== Olympic results ==
Year
Year	Age	Slalom	Giant slalom	Super-G	Downhill	Combined
2022	30	—	—	—	6	—
