= Emelie Wikström =

Swedish alpine skier

Personal information
- Born: 2 October 1992 (age 33)

Skiing career
- Sport: Alpine skiing
- Club: IFK Sävsjö
- Retired: 7 October 2021 (age 29)
- Disciplines: Slalom
- World Cup debut: 30 January 2009 (age 17)

Olympics
- Teams: 2 – (2014, 2018)
- Medals: 0

World Championships
- Teams: 3 – (2011, 2017, 2021)
- Medals: 1 (team) (0 gold)

World Cup
- Seasons: 13 – (2009–2021)
- Wins: 0
- Podiums: 0
- Overall titles: 0
- Discipline titles: 0
Medal record
Women's alpine skiing
Representing Sweden
World Championships
Bronze medal – third place	2017 St. Moritz	Team event

Emelie Wikström (born 2 October 1992) is a Swedish former World Cup alpine ski racer.

Wikström made her World Cup debut March 2009 in Garmisch Partenkirchen, Germany. Her best result in World Cup was a 4th place in slalom from 2012. She participated at the 2011 World Ski Championships, where she achieved a 24th place in slalom.

Wikström represented Sweden at the 2014 Winter Olympics in slalom where she finished 6th.

== Olympic results ==
Year	Age	Slalom	Giant slalom	Super-G	Downhill	Combined
2014	21	6	—	—	—	—
2018	25	12	—	—	—	—

== World Championship results ==
Year	Age	Slalom	Giant slalom	Super-G	Downhill	Combined	Team event
2011	18	24	-	—	—	—	-
2017	24	8	-	—	—	—	3
2021	28	15	-	—	—	—	-
