= FIS Alpine World Ski Championships 2021 – Women's slalom =

Women's slalom at the FIS Alpine World Ski Championships 2021
- Location: Cortina d'Ampezzo, Italy
- Date: 20 February
- Competitors: 106 from 44 nations
- Winning time: 1:39.50

Medalists
| gold medal | Katharina Liensberger | Austria |
| silver medal | Petra Vlhová | Slovakia |
| bronze medal | Mikaela Shiffrin | United States |

Women's Slalom
- Location: Druscié; Cortina d'Ampezzo, Italy
- Vertical: 210 m (689 ft)
- Top elevation: 1,700 m (5,577 ft)
- Base elevation: 1,490 m (4,888 ft)

The Women's slalom competition at the FIS Alpine World Ski Championships 2021 was held on 20 February. A qualification was scheduled for 19 February 2021, but got cancelled.

== Results ==
The first run was started at 10:00, and the second run at 13:30.

| Rank | Bib | Name | Nation | Run 1 | Rank | Run 2 | Rank | Total | Diff |
|---|---|---|---|---|---|---|---|---|---|
| 1st place, gold medalist(s) | 1 | Katharina Liensberger | Austria | 48.48 | 1 | 51.02 | 1 | 1:39.50 | — |
| 2nd place, silver medalist(s) | 2 | Petra Vlhová | Slovakia | 48.78 | 2 | 51.72 | 4 | 1:40.50 | +1.00 |
| 3rd place, bronze medalist(s) | 4 | Mikaela Shiffrin | United States | 49.78 | 4 | 51.70 | 3 | 1:41.48 | +1.98 |
| 4 | 7 | Wendy Holdener | Switzerland | 49.72 | 3 | 52.12 | 8 | 1:41.84 | +2.34 |
| 5 | 31 | Andreja Slokar | Slovenia | 50.81 | 17 | 51.36 | 2 | 1:42.17 | +2.67 |
| 6 | 5 | Chiara Mair | Austria | 50.51 | 11 | 51.74 | 5 | 1:42.25 | +2.75 |
| 7 | 12 | Kristin Lysdahl | Norway | 50.53 | 12 | 51.91 | 6 | 1:42.44 | +2.94 |
| 8 | 25 | Camille Rast | Switzerland | 50.15 | 6 | 52.44 | 11 | 1:42.59 | +3.09 |
| 9 | 20 | Ana Bucik | Slovenia | 49.87 | 5 | 53.02 | 22 | 1:42.89 | +3.39 |
| 10 | 24 | Asa Ando | Japan | 50.45 | 8 | 52.47 | 13 | 1:42.92 | +3.42 |
| 11 | 21 | Nastasia Noens | France | 50.50 | 9 | 52.55 | 16 | 1:43.05 | +3.55 |
| 11 | 17 | Franziska Gritsch | Austria | 50.60 | 14 | 52.45 | 12 | 1:43.05 | +3.55 |
| 13 | 22 | Sara Hector | Sweden | 50.63 | 15 | 52.47 | 13 | 1:43.10 | +3.60 |
| 14 | 10 | Lena Dürr | Germany | 50.44 | 7 | 52.81 | 18 | 1:43.25 | +3.75 |
| 15 | 15 | Emelie Wikström | Sweden | 50.51 | 10 | 52.81 | 18 | 1:43.32 | +3.82 |
| 16 | 41 | Elsa Fermbäck | Sweden | 51.32 | 21 | 52.10 | 7 | 1:43.42 | +3.92 |
| 17 | 3 | Laurence St. Germain | Canada | 50.57 | 13 | 52.93 | 21 | 1:43.50 | +4.00 |
| 18 | 14 | Irene Curtoni | Italy | 50.96 | 18 | 52.71 | 17 | 1:43.67 | +4.17 |
| 19 | 26 | Martina Peterlini | Italy | 51.59 | 25 | 52.23 | 10 | 1:43.82 | +4.32 |
| 20 | 33 | Andrea Filser | Germany | 51.72 | 27 | 52.17 | 9 | 1:43.89 | +4.39 |
| 21 | 29 | Leona Popović | Croatia | 51.67 | 26 | 52.49 | 15 | 1:44.16 | +4.66 |
| 22 | 8 | Thea Louise Stjernesund | Norway | 51.43 | 23 | 52.81 | 18 | 1:44.24 | +4.74 |
| 23 | 51 | Ekaterina Tkachenko | Russian Ski Federation | 51.46 | 24 | 53.35 | 25 | 1:44.81 | +5.31 |
| 24 | 47 | Dženifera Ģērmane | Latvia | 51.98 | 29 | 53.20 | 23 | 1:45.18 | +5.68 |
| 24 | 32 | Ali Nullmeyer | Canada | 51.90 | 28 | 53.28 | 24 | 1:45.18 | +5.68 |
| 26 | 50 | Anita Gulli | Italy | 52.36 | 31 | 54.53 | 26 | 1:46.89 | +7.39 |
| 27 | 30 | Amelia Smart | Canada | 52.49 | 32 | 55.48 | 28 | 1:47.97 | +8.47 |
| 28 | 46 | Maria Shkanova | Belarus | 53.62 | 38 | 55.88 | 29 | 1:49.50 | +10.00 |
| 29 | 52 | Kim Vanreusel | Belgium | 53.25 | 36 | 56.52 | 30 | 1:49.77 | +10.27 |
| 30 | 49 | Anastasia Gornostaeva | Russian Ski Federation | 55.12 | 41 | 54.91 | 27 | 1:50.03 | +10.53 |
| 31 | 56 | Zazie Huml | Czech Republic | 54.55 | 40 | 56.75 | 31 | 1:51.30 | +11.80 |
| 32 | 60 | Petra Hromcová | Slovakia | 56.14 | 43 | 58.24 | 32 | 1:54.38 | +14.88 |
| 33 | 64 | Nino Tsiklauri | Georgia | 55.85 | 42 | 59.59 | 33 | 1:55.44 | +15.94 |
| 34 | 86 | Maria Constantin | Romania | 59.70 | 50 | 1:02.07 | 34 | 2:01.77 | +22.27 |
| 35 | 78 | Anastasiya Shepilenko | Ukraine | 59.44 | 49 | 1:02.74 | 35 | 2:02.18 | +22.68 |
| 36 | 96 | Ornella Oettl Reyes | Peru | 1:01.31 | 53 | 1:03.49 | 37 | 2:04.80 | +25.30 |
| 36 | 89 | Kateryna Pyrozhko | Ukraine | 1:02.06 | 55 | 1:02.74 | 35 | 2:04.80 | +25.30 |
| 38 | 83 | Maria Kaltsogianni | Greece | 1:00.62 | 51 | 1:06.02 | 40 | 2:06.64 | +27.14 |
| 39 | 93 | Tetiana Knopova | Ukraine | 1:01.60 | 54 | 1:05.84 | 39 | 2:07.44 | +27.94 |
| 40 | 88 | Fani Marmarelli | Greece | 1:03.26 | 56 | 1:05.49 | 38 | 2:08.75 | +29.25 |
| 41 | 70 | Katalin Dorultán | Hungary | 1:05.42 | 57 | 1:08.63 | 41 | 2:13.92 | +34.42 |
| 42 | 91 | Marjan Kalhor | Iran | 1:08.12 | 60 | 1:12.18 | 42 | 2:20.30 | +40.80 |
| 43 | 90 | Forough Abbasi | Iran | 1:07.26 | 59 | 1:16.15 | 43 | 2:23.41 | +43.91 |
| 44 | 99 | Naya Kurdi | Lebanon | 1:10.66 | 61 | Did not qualify | | | |
| 45 | 101 | Christina Tzimpa | Greece | 1:11.74 | 62 | Did not qualify | | | |
| 46 | 103 | Maria Abou Jaoude | Lebanon | 1:13.77 | 63 | Did not qualify | | | |
| 47 | 107 | Aanchal Thakur | India | 1:23.40 | 64 | Did not qualify | | | |
| 48 | 105 | Chiara Di Camillo | Albania | 1:26.13 | 65 | Did not qualify | | | |
| | 9 | Mina Fürst Holtmann | Norway | 51.07 | 19 | Did not finish | | | |
| | 11 | Erin Mielzynski | Canada | 51.17 | 20 | Did not finish | | | |
| | 19 | Melanie Meillard | Switzerland | 50.65 | 16 | Did not finish | | | |
| | 28 | Nina O'Brien | United States | 51.35 | 22 | Did not finish | | | |
| | 36 | Mireia Gutiérrez | Andorra | 53.26 | 37 | Did not finish | | | |
| | 40 | Piera Hudson | New Zealand | 53.11 | 34 | Did not finish | | | |
| | 45 | AJ Hurt | United States | 52.18 | 30 | Did not finish | | | |
| | 48 | Emma Aicher | Germany | 52.68 | 33 | Did not finish | | | |
| | 57 | Francesca Baruzzi | Argentina | 53.82 | 39 | Did not finish | | | |
| | 65 | Vanina Guerillot | Portugal | 57.63 | 45 | Did not finish | | | |
| | 66 | Nuunu Chemnitz Berthelsen | Denmark | 58.89 | 48 | Did not finish | | | |
| | 67 | Eva Vukadinova | Bulgaria | 57.35 | 44 | Did not finish | | | |
| | 76 | Tess Arbez | Ireland | 58.41 | 47 | Did not finish | | | |
| | 79 | Liene Bondare | Latvia | 58.21 | 46 | Did not finish | | | |
| | 85 | Nikolina Dragoljević | Bosnia and Herzegovina | 1:00.90 | 52 | Did not finish | | | |
| | 97 | Carlie Iskandar | Lebanon | 1:06.56 | 58 | Did not finish | | | |
| | 44 | Neja Dvornik | Slovenia | 53.11 | 34 | Did not start | | | |
| | 6 | Michelle Gisin | Switzerland | Did not finish | | | | | |
| | 13 | Katharina Huber | Austria | Did not finish | | | | | |
| | 16 | Federica Brignone | Italy | Did not finish | | | | | |
| | 18 | Paula Moltzan | United States | Did not finish | | | | | |
| | 23 | Kristina Riis-Johannessen | Norway | Did not finish | | | | | |
| | 27 | Meta Hrovat | Slovenia | Did not finish | | | | | |
| | 34 | Charlie Guest | Great Britain | Did not finish | | | | | |
| | 35 | Gabriela Capová | Czech Republic | Did not finish | | | | | |
| | 37 | Alex Tilley | Great Britain | Did not finish | | | | | |
| | 38 | Riikka Honkanen | Finland | Did not finish | | | | | |
| | 39 | Andrea Komšić | Croatia | Did not finish | | | | | |
| | 42 | Katie Hensien | United States | Did not finish | | | | | |
| | 43 | Doriane Escané | France | Did not finish | | | | | |
| | 53 | Charlotte Lingg | Liechtenstein | Did not finish | | | | | |
| | 54 | Elese Sommerová | Czech Republic | Did not finish | | | | | |
| | 55 | Carla Mijares | Andorra | Did not finish | | | | | |
| | 58 | Zita Tóth | Hungary | Did not finish | | | | | |
| | 59 | Axelle Mollin | Belgium | Did not finish | | | | | |
| | 61 | Erika Pykäläinen | Finland | Did not finish | | | | | |
| | 62 | Noa Szőllős | Israel | Did not finish | | | | | |
| | 63 | Sara Roggeman | Belgium | Did not finish | | | | | |
| | 68 | Katla Björg Dagbjartsdóttir | Iceland | Did not finish | | | | | |
| | 69 | Szonja Hozmann | Hungary | Did not finish | | | | | |
| | 71 | Hólmfríður Dóra Friðgeirsdóttir | Iceland | Did not finish | | | | | |
| | 72 | Esma Alić | Bosnia and Herzegovina | Did not finish | | | | | |
| | 73 | Maria Tsiovolou | Greece | Did not finish | | | | | |
| | 74 | Sigríður Dröfn Auðunsdóttir | Iceland | Did not finish | | | | | |
| | 75 | Hanna Majtényi | Hungary | Did not finish | | | | | |
| | 77 | Hjördís Birna Ingvadóttir | Iceland | Did not finish | | | | | |
| | 80 | Maja Tadić | Bosnia and Herzegovina | Did not finish | | | | | |
| | 81 | Atefeh Ahmadi | Iran | Did not finish | | | | | |
| | 82 | Laura Bišere | Latvia | Did not finish | | | | | |
| | 84 | Jelena Vujičić | Montenegro | Did not finish | | | | | |
| | 94 | Kateryna Shepilenko | Ukraine | Did not finish | | | | | |
| | 95 | Ieva Januškevičiūtė | Lithuania | Did not finish | | | | | |
| | 98 | Gabija Šinkūnaitė | Lithuania | Did not finish | | | | | |
| | 100 | Georgia Epiphaniou | Cyprus | Did not finish | | | | | |
| | 102 | Thaleia Armeni | Cyprus | Did not finish | | | | | |
| | 104 | Tamara Popović | Montenegro | Did not finish | | | | | |
| | 106 | Karolina Photiades | Cyprus | Did not finish | | | | | |
| | 87 | Manon Ouaiss | Lebanon | Disqualified | | | | | |
| | 92 | Sadaf Saveh Shemshaki | Iran | Did not start | | | | | |
