= 2020 Alpine Skiing World Cup – Women's parallel =

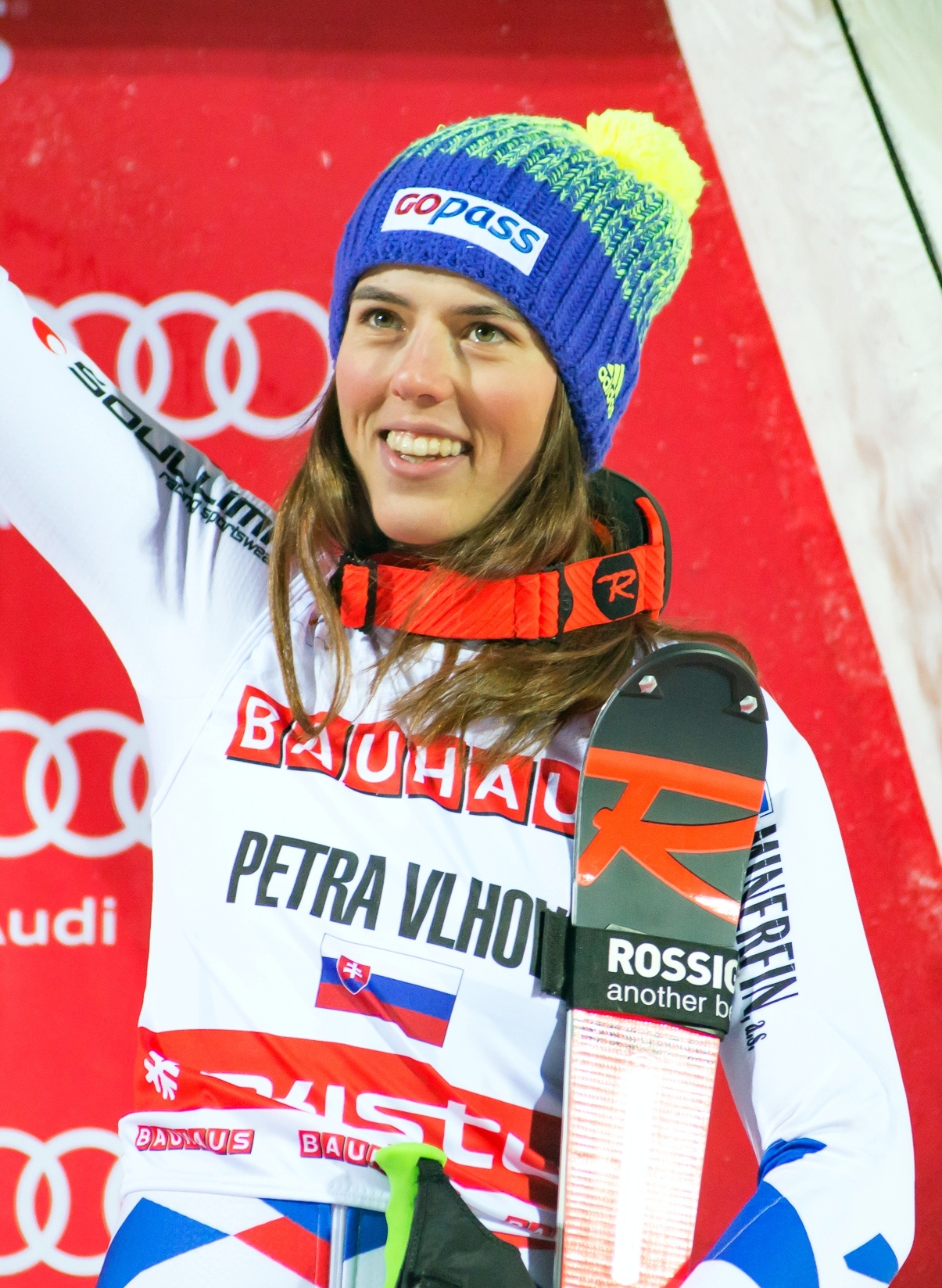
2020 Women's parallel World Cup: Petra Vlhová of Slovakia, season champion; 2020 Women's World Cup; Overall • downhill • super-G; giant slalom • slalom; combined • parallel
Previous: 2019	Next: 2021

The women's parallel competition in the 2020 FIS Alpine Skiing World Cup was contested as a World Cup discipline separate from slalom for the first time in 2020. Prior to the season, FIS decided to combine parallel skiing events (including all of parallel giant slalom, parallel slalom, and city events (parallel slaloms held on courses built within cities)) into a new discipline, joining the existing disciplines of downhill, super-G, giant slalom, slalom, and Alpine combined. The discipline winner would receive a small crystal globe, similar to the other disciplines. However, at the same time, FIS decided to drop the city events to reduce the amount of travel required during the World Cup season, planning to replace them with more parallel events at regular venues.

The parallel format was also changed to make the race more TV-friendly. Parallel races now began with one classic qualification run to determine the top 32, who advanced to the elimination phase of the main competition. The round of 32 used the existing run and re-run format, so that each competitor got to start from each side, but from the round of 16 forward, there was only one run per race and a direct knockout system—the loser of each race was gone. However, the new format immediately became controversial, as making two giant slalom courses equal in a single-run format proved impossible, and the first women's parallel giant slalom race suffered from "the luck of the draw" becoming determinative—17 of 20 winners came from the same course.

Ultimately, only two parallel events, the first a parallel slalom (PS) and the second a parallel giant slalom (PG), were held in the 2019–20 season. A third event, another parallel slalom, had been scheduled for Åre, Sweden, near the end of the season, but it was canceled to the COVID-19 pandemic. In the two parallel events that were held, Slovakian skier Petra Vlhová won the first event and also won the first-ever discipline championship and accompanying crystal globe for women in parallel. At this time, individual parallel races were not included in the season finals, which were scheduled in 2020 for Cortina d'Ampezzo, Italy but were cancelled due to the COVID-19 pandemic.

== Standings ==
#	Skier	15 Dec 2019; St. Moritz (Switzerland); PS	19 Jan 2020; Sestriere (Italy); PG	12 Mar 2020; Åre (Sweden); PS	Tot.
	(Slovakia) Petra Vlhová	100	13	x	113
2	(France) Clara Direz	DNS	100	x	100
3	(Italy) Federica Brignone	40	50	x	90
4	(Sweden) Anna Swenn-Larsson	80	DNS	x	80
	(Austria) Elisa Mörzinger	DNS	80	x	80
6	(Italy) Marta Bassino	18	60	x	78
7	(Norway) Kristin Lysdahl	26	40	x	66
8	(Austria) Franziska Gritsch	60	DNS	x	60
9	(Slovenia) Meta Hrovat	50	8	x	58
10	(Italy) Sofia Goggia	10	45	x	55
11	(Canada) Laurence St. Germain	45	DNS	x	45
12	(Switzerland) Aline Danioth	22	16	x	38
13	(Switzerland) Wendy Holdener	11	26	x	37
14	(Norway) Nina Haver-Løseth	36	DNS	x	36
	(Norway) Thea Louise Stjernesund	DNS	36	x	36
16	(Sweden) Sara Hector	12	22	x	34
17	(Slovenia) Ana Bucik	32	DNS	x	32
	(Slovenia) Tina Robnik	DNS	32	x	32
19	(United States) Nina O'Brien	7	24	x	31
20	(Sweden) Estelle Alphand	29	DNS	x	29
	(United States) Mikaela Shiffrin	DNS	29	x	29
22	(Austria) Katharina Truppe	24	2	x	26
23	(Switzerland) Lara Gut-Behrami	DNS	20	x	20
	(Germany) Christina Ackermann	20	DNS	x	20
25	(Italy) Laura Pirovano	DNS	18	x	18
	References				

- Winner
- 2nd place
- 3rd place
- DNS = Did Not Start
- Updated at 22 March 2020, after all events.

== See also ==
- 2020 Alpine Skiing World Cup – Women's summary rankings
- 2020 Alpine Skiing World Cup – Women's overall
- 2020 Alpine Skiing World Cup – Women's downhill
- 2020 Alpine Skiing World Cup – Women's super-G
- 2020 Alpine Skiing World Cup – Women's giant slalom
- 2020 Alpine Skiing World Cup – Women's slalom
- 2020 Alpine Skiing World Cup – Women's combined
- World Cup scoring system
