= 2025 Alpine Skiing World Cup – Women's downhill =

Alpine ski discipline year standings

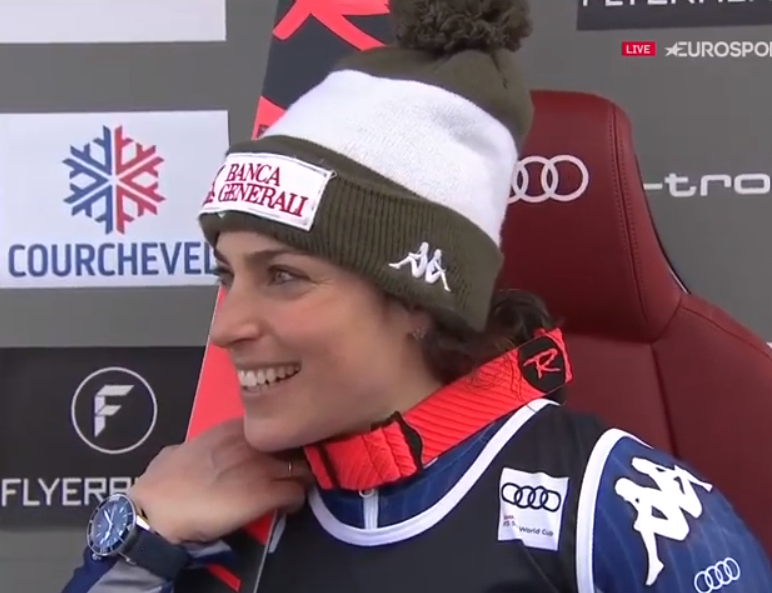
2025 Women's Downhill World Cup: Federica Brignone of Italy, season champion; 2025 Women's World Cup; Overall • Downhill • Super-G; Giant slalom • Slalom
Previous: 2024	Next: 2026

The women's downhill in the 2025 FIS Alpine Skiing World Cup consisted of six events, including the final. A seventh scheduled downhill at La Thuile in mid-March was cancelled due to excessive snowfall, which forced both training runs to be cancelled, thus preventing the race from taking place, and then the downhill at finals was cancelled due to fresh snowfall and high winds. After the elimination of the two downhills scheduled in November on the "Gran Becca" course on the Matterhorn from the 2025 schedule, the first race of the season in this discipline did not take place on 14 December in Beaver Creek, Colorado, United States. Italy's Federica Brignone not only won her first downhill during the season but (with the two season-ending cancellations) defeated defending champion Conny Hütter of Austria and her countrywoman (and four-time discipline champion) Sofia Goggia to win her first crystal globe in the discipline this season (to go along with the overall championship, which she had already clinched).

The season was interrupted for the Alpine Skiing World Championships, this time in Saalbach, Austria during 4–16 February 2025. The championship in women's downhill took place on Saturday, 8 February, and was won by American Breezy Johnson, who had returned from a suspension in December 2024 but was only ranked tenth so far this season.

== Season summary ==
The first downhill of the 2025 season was held on the very steep Birds of Prey course at Beaver Creek, Colorado, United States, the first time the women World Cup racers had ever held a competitive event on the course (although the men have been running the course for decades), and defending discipline champion Cornelia Hütter of Austria (who commented, "I've never skied that steep before.") edged past both Sofia Goggia of Italy, the four-time discipline champion in her first race back from a season-ending injury in February, and defending overall champion Lara Gut-Behrami of Switzerland. The next downhill, one month later in St Anton, Austria, produced several surprises: a victory by Federica Brignone, at 34 the oldest winner ever on the women's World Cup circuit, winning her 30th World Cup race and her first downhill ever; a second place by rising Swiss star Malorie Blanc in her second-ever World Cup race; and a sixth place by 40-year-old Lindsey Vonn, an 8-time downhill discipline champion now returning to the circuit after six years in retirement and a complete knee replacement with titanium. Goggia returned to the winner's circle back in her home country in the next race at Cortina d'Ampezzo, Italy, with her countrywoman Brignone, who finished third, taking over both the lead in the discipline and the overall lead.

In the last downhill before the World Championships, Brignone won the downhill at Garmisch-Partenkirchen, Germany by 1/100 of a second over Goggia, enabling her to expand her lead in the discipline over Goggia to 29 points, with defending champion Hütter 81 points back. But in the World Championships, American Breezy Johnson, who had never won a World Cup race despite seven top-three finishes, surprisingly turned in the winning time as the first skier on the course. In the first of two downhills at Kvitfjell after the worlds, Hütter recovered from failing to podium before home fans at Saalbach and won her second downhill of the season, edging out (by .05 seconds) Germany's Emma Aicher, a 21-year-old all-events skier reaching her first World Cup podium ever, with Johnson third for her first World Cup podium of the season. In the second race, Aicher edged out 22-year-old American Lauren Macuga by .03 seconds for her first World Cup win, with Hütter finishing third and closing to 16 points behind Brignone for the season lead (with Goggia another 18 points back and two races to go). The snowout at La Thuile then delayed the three-woman showdown for the discipline championship until finals.

== Finals ==
The World Cup finals in the discipline were scheduled to take place on Saturday, 22 March 2025 in Sun Valley, Idaho, United States. Only the top 25 skiers in the World Cup slalom discipline and the winner of the Junior World Championship in the discipline (Stefanie Grob of Switzerland), plus any skiers who have scored at least 500 points in the World Cup overall classification for the season, were eligible to compete in the final, and only the top 15 would earn World Cup points. This season, there was a tie for 25th place, so both were permitted to enter. The only entry to utilize the 500+-point scoring rule was Alice Robinson of New Zealand, and two eligible skiers -- Grob and Ester Ledecká of Czechia -- did not enter due to scheduling conflicts, thus creating a field with 26 entries for finals. After the second training run, two more skiers (Michelle Gisin of Switzerland and Stephanie Venier of Austria) withdrew due to injury, reducing the field further to 24. However, a combination of fresh snow in the morning and high winds in the early afternoon forced the downhill finals to be cancelled, thus handing the discipline crown to current leader Brignone.

== Standings ==
	Venue	14 Dec 2024; Beaver Creek	11 Jan 2025; St Anton	18 Jan 2025; Cortina d'Ampezzo	25 Jan 2025; Garmisch	8 Feb 2025; Saalbach WC	28 Feb 2025; Kvitfjell	1 Mar 2025; Kvitfjell	14 Mar 2025; La Thuile	22 Mar 2025; Sun Valley	
#	Skier	(United States)	(Austria)	(Italy)	(Germany)	(Austria)	(Norway)	(Norway)	(Italy)	(United States)	Total
	(Italy) Federica Brignone	29	100	60	100	⑩	45	50	x	x	384
2	(Austria) Cornelia Hütter	100	36	40	32	④	100	60	x	x	368
3	(Italy) Sofia Goggia	80	DNF	100	80	⑯	50	40	x	x	350
4	(United States) Lauren Macuga	50	29	15	40	⑤	16	80	x	x	230
5	(Switzerland) Lara Gut-Behrami	60	20	50	45	DNF	22	32	x	x	229
6	(Italy) Laura Pirovano	24	50	24	26	⑬	40	45	x	x	209
7	(United States) Breezy Johnson	20	24	9	50	①	60	26	x	x	189
8	(Czech Republic) Ester Ledecká	40	60	32	DNS	③	29	22	x	DNS	183
9	(Germany) Emma Aicher	0	DNF	0	DNS	⑥	80	100	x	x	180
10	(Switzerland) Corinne Suter	10	16	45	60	⑦	18	29	x	x	178
11	(Norway) Kajsa Vickhoff Lie	22	18	80	22	⑭	15	11	x	x	168
12	(Slovenia) Ilka Štuhec	26	14	29	9	⑪	36	20	x	x	134
13	(United States) Jacqueline Wiles	2	DNF	36	24	DNF	32	18	x	x	112
14	(Austria) Mirjam Puchner	16	13	26	15	②	24	13	x	x	107
15	(Austria) Ariane Rädler	8	26	18	36	⑰	13	5	x	x	106
16	(Austria) Stephanie Venier	14	45	22	11	⑨	5	DNS	x	DNS	97
17	(Germany) Kira Weidle-Winkelmann	DNS	22	14	29	⑫	26	DNF	x	x	91
18	(Switzerland) Malorie Blanc	DNS	80	7	DNS	⑲	2	0	x	x	89
19	(United States) Lindsey Vonn	DNS	40	11	DNF	⑮	20	15	x	x	86
20	(Norway) Marte Monsen	6	8	0	14	⑰	11	36	x	x	75
21	(Italy) Marta Bassino	36	DNS	13	22	DNS	0	0	x	x	71
22	(Switzerland) Michelle Gisin	32	10	0	14	DNS	4	6	x	DNS	66
23	(Italy) Nicol Delago	0	3	8	18	⑧	14	14	x	x	57
24	(France) Laura Gauché	3	15	22	10	⑳	0	5	x	x	55
25	(Italy) Nadia Delago	4	2	0	12	DNS	12	24	x	x	54
	(Austria) Christina Ager	11	7	16	7	DNS	3	10	x	x	54
27	(Austria) Ricarda Haaser	45	6	2	DNF	DNS			x	NE	53
28	(Switzerland) Priska Ming-Nufer	18	DSQ	1	8	㉑	7	16	x	NE	50
29	(Italy) Elena Curtoni	7	12	DNF	16	DNS	9	2	x	NE	46
30	(Austria) Nina Ortlieb	9	32	4	DNF	DNS			x	NE	45
31	(France) Romane Miradoli	12	9	5	6	㉓	1	3	x	NE	36
	(Switzerland) Delia Durrer	1	0	12	3	DNS	11	9	x	NE	36
33	(Austria) Magdalena Egger	DNS	0	6	5	DNS	0	13	x	NE	24
34	(Switzerland) Janine Schmitt	DNS	12	0	0	DNS	0	8	x	NE	20
35	(Austria) Nadine Fest	DNS	5	DNS	0	DNS	6	8	x	NE	19
36	(Switzerland) Jasmina Suter	15	0	0	DNS				x	NE	15
37	(Italy) Roberta Melesi	13	DNF	0	0	DNS	0	DNS	x	NE	13
38	(Canada) Valérie Grenier	DNS	0	10	DNS		0	0	x	NE	10
39	(United States) Isabella Wright	0	0	0	DNF	DNS	8	DNF	x	NE	8
40	(Bosnia and Herzegovina) Elvedina Muzaferija	6	0	0	0	㉓	0	0	x	NE	6
41	(France) Karen Clément	0	4	0	0	㉒	0	0	x	NE	4
	(New Zealand) Alice Robinson	DNS	0	DNS	4	DNS	0	DNS	x	x	4
43	(United States) Keely Cashman	0	0	3	0	DNS	DNF	0	x	NE	3
44	(Italy) Vicky Bernardi	0	0	0	2	DNS	0	0	x	NE	2
45	(Italy) Sara Thaler	0	1	DNF	DNS				x	NE	1
	(Switzerland) Joana Hählen	DNF	0	DNF	1	DNS	0	DNS	x	NE	1
	(United States) Haley Cutler	0	0	0	0	DNS	0	1	x	NE	1
	References										

=== Legend ===
- Winner (100 points)
- 2nd place (80 points)
- 3rd place (60 points)
- DNF = Did not finish
- DSQ = Disqualified
- Did not start (DNS)
- Not eligible for finals (NE)
- Race canceled (x)
- FIS non-World Cup race (World Championships)
- Updated on 22 March 2025, after all events.

== See also ==
- 2025 Alpine Skiing World Cup – Women's summary rankings
- 2025 Alpine Skiing World Cup – Women's overall
- 2025 Alpine Skiing World Cup – Women's super-G
- 2025 Alpine Skiing World Cup – Women's giant slalom
- 2025 Alpine Skiing World Cup – Women's slalom
- World Cup scoring system
