= 2023 Alpine Skiing World Cup – Women's downhill =

Alpine ski discipline year standings

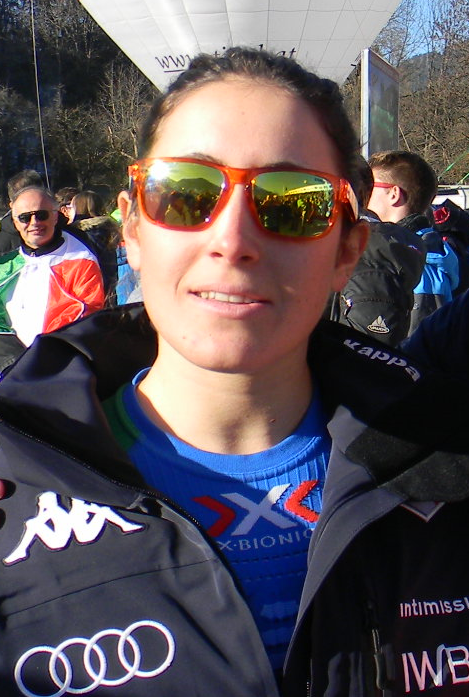
2023 Women's downhill World Cup: Sofia Goggia of Italy, discipline champion for third consecutive season; 2023 Women's World Cup; Overall • Downhill • Super-G; Giant slalom • Slalom
| Previous: 2022 | Next: 2024 |

The women's downhill in the 2023 FIS Alpine Skiing World Cup consisted of nine events, including the final. The original schedule called for eleven events, but the first two races of the season scheduled for 5 and 6 November 2022 in Zermatt/Cervinia (on the Matterhorn, which would have crossed an international border between the start (in Switzerland) and the finish (in Italy)), were canceled due to adverse weather conditions; the FIS decided not to reschedule them. Once the season began, a downhill scheduled in St. Anton on 14 January had to be converted into a Super-G due to the inability to hold a pre-race training run on either of the two days prior to the downhill. However, a subsequent Super-G scheduled at Cortina d'Ampezzo was converted into a downhill, restoring the original schedule.

Three-time discipline champion (and two-time defending champion) Sofia Goggia of Italy won four of the first five downhills, similar to the prior two seasons, and established a lead of more than 200 points. Goggia was the only skier to reach the podium in all five races, as she finished second in the race that she did not win. After winning the race in Crans Montana, Switzerland, Goggia held a lead of 179 points over 2017 discipline champion Ilka Štuhec of Slovenia, with only two races remaining. In the next downhill in Kvitfjell, Goggia's runner-up finish secured her third straight discipline championship (and fourth overall).

The season was interrupted by the 2023 World Ski Championships in the linked resorts of Courchevel and Méribel, France from 6–19 February 2023. Although the Alpine Skiing branch of the International Ski Federation (FIS) conducts both the World Cup and the World Championships, the World Championships are organized by nation (a maximum of four skiers is generally permitted per nation), and (after 1970) the results count only for World Championship medals, not for World Cup points. Accordingly, the results in the World Championship are highlighted in blue and shown in this table by ordinal position only in each discipline. The women's downhill was held in Méribel on 11 February.

The World Cup finals took place on Wednesday, 15 March in Soldeu, Andorra, which also hosted the finals in 2019. Only the top 25 skiers in the World Cup downhill discipline and the winner of the Junior World Championship, plus any skiers who have scored at least 500 points in the World Cup overall classification for the season, were eligible to compete in the discipline final, and only the top 15 earned World Cup points.

== Standings ==
| | Venue | 5 Nov 2022; Zermatt/Cervinia | 6 Nov 2022; Zermatt/Cervinia | 2 Dec 2022; Lake Louise | 3 Dec 2022; Lake Louise | 16 Dec 2022; St. Moritz | 17 Dec 2022; St. Moritz | 20 Jan 2023; Cortina d'Ampezzo | 21 Jan 2023; Cortina d'Ampezzo | 11 Feb 2023; Méribel WC | 26 Feb 2023; Crans Montana | 4 Mar 2023; Kvitfjell | 15 Mar 2023; Soldeu | |
| # | Skier | (Switzerland) (Italy) | (Switzerland) (Italy) | (Canada) | (Canada) | (Switzerland) | (Switzerland) | (Italy) | (Italy) | (France) | (Switzerland) | (Norway) | (Andorra) | Total |
| | (Italy) Sofia Goggia | x | x | 100 | 100 | 80 | 100 | 100 | DNF | DSQ | 100 | 80 | 80 | 740 |
| 2 | (Slovenia) Ilka Štuhec | x | x | 45 | 45 | 22 | 80 | 80 | 100 | ⑥ | 29 | 50 | 100 | 551 |
| 3 | (Switzerland) Corinne Suter | x | x | 80 | 60 | 60 | 18 | DNF | DNS | ③ | 11 | 60 | 20 | 309 |
| 4 | (Italy) Elena Curtoni | x | x | 32 | 22 | 100 | 32 | 32 | 60 | ⑬ | 10 | 20 | DNF | 308 |
| 5 | (Austria) Mirjam Puchner | x | x | 50 | 45 | 14 | 36 | 4 | 29 | ④ | 26 | 24 | 45 | 273 |
| 6 | (Switzerland) Lara Gut-Behrami | x | x | 13 | 20 | 32 | 22 | 45 | 50 | ⑨ | 20 | 10 | 60 | 272 |
| 7 | (Germany) Kira Weidle | x | x | 36 | 24 | 7 | 60 | 60 | 16 | ⑧ | 18 | DNF | 29 | 250 |
| 8 | (Norway) Kajsa Vickhoff Lie | x | x | 1 | 1 | 0 | 7 | 20 | 80 | ⑮ | 5 | 100 | 32 | 246 |
| 9 | (Austria) Nina Ortlieb | x | x | 40 | 80 | 18 | 40 | 18 | DNF | ② | 4 | 29 | DNF | 229 |
| 10 | (Norway) Ragnhild Mowinckel | x | x | 6 | 29 | 32 | 13 | 9 | 50 | ⑩ | 50 | 13 | 24 | 226 |
| 11 | (United States) Breezy Johnson | x | x | 15 | 5 | 45 | 6 | 29 | 26 | DNF | 24 | 32 | 40 | 222 |
| 12 | (United States) Mikaela Shiffrin | x | x | DNS | | 40 | 50 | 50 | 36 | DNS | | 45 | DNS | 221 |
| 13 | (Switzerland) Joana Hählen | x | x | 29 | 50 | 15 | 29 | 6 | 6 | ⑰ | 45 | 18 | 22 | 220 |
| 14 | (Italy) Federica Brignone | x | x | DNS | 3 | 36 | 0 | 13 | DNS | | 80 | 36 | 50 | 218 |
| 15 | (Switzerland) Jasmine Flury | x | x | 26 | 16 | 50 | 26 | 8 | 13 | ① | 14 | 14 | 18 | 185 |
| 16 | (Austria) Cornelia Hütter | x | x | 60 | DNS | 24 | 45 | 14 | 22 | ④ | 0 | DNF | 0 | 165 |
| 17 | (United States) Isabella Wright | x | x | 20 | 13 | DNF | 24 | 24 | 15 | ⑲ | DNF | 22 | 36 | 154 |
| 18 | (France) Laura Gauché | x | x | 5 | 4 | 7 | 9 | 36 | DNF | ⑫ | 60 | 0 | 29 | 150 |
| 19 | (Switzerland) Michelle Gisin | x | x | 9 | 32 | 12 | 16 | 11 | 26 | DNS | 32 | 2 | 0 | 140 |
| 20 | (Switzerland) Priska Nufer | x | x | 2 | 12 | 3 | 11 | 5 | 40 | ⑪ | 40 | 26 | 0 | 139 |
| 21 | (Italy) Laura Pirovano | x | x | 8 | 0 | 26 | 14 | 22 | 14 | ⑭ | 36 | 16 | 0 | 136 |
| 22 | (Austria) Stephanie Venier | x | x | DNS | 11 | 11 | 15 | 26 | 32 | ⑦ | 3 | 15 | 0 | 113 |
| 23 | (Austria) Ramona Siebenhofer | x | x | 3 | 15 | 0 | 13 | 15 | 20 | DNS | 0 | 45 | DNS | 111 |
| 24 | (Italy) Nicol Delago | x | x | 22 | 36 | 0 | 3 | 13 | 10 | ⑱ | 0 | 5 | 16 | 105 |
| 25 | (Austria) Christina Ager | x | x | 15 | 2 | 20 | 10 | 10 | 10 | DNS | 16 | 11 | 0 | 94 |
| 26 | (Austria) Tamara Tippler | x | x | DNS | | 9 | 20 | 40 | 20 | DNS | DNF | DNS | | 89 |
| 27 | (France) Romane Miradoli | x | x | 24 | 26 | DNF | 2 | 18 | 12 | ⑮ | DNF | DNS | NE | 82 |
| 28 | (Germany) Emma Aicher | x | x | 0 | 10 | 16 | 8 | DNS | | DNF | 6 | 8 | NE | 48 |
| | (Switzerland) Delia Durrer | x | x | 11 | 20 | 0 | 0 | 2 | 8 | DNS | 0 | 7 | NE | 48 |
| 30 | (Austria) Ariane Rädler | x | x | 16 | 14 | 0 | 1 | DNS | | | 13 | DNS | NE | 44 |
| 31 | (Italy) Marta Bassino | x | x | 10 | 9 | DNS | 0 | DNS | | | 15 | DNS | 0 | 34 |
| | (Italy) Nadia Delago | x | x | 4 | 8 | 0 | 5 | 3 | 7 | DNS | 7 | 0 | NE | 34 |
| | (New Zealand) Alice Robinson | x | x | DNS | 0 | DNS | 1 | DNS | | | 24 | 9 | NE | 34 |
| 34 | (Switzerland) Stephanie Jenal | x | x | DNF | 0 | 5 | 0 | 0 | 11 | DNS | 12 | 4 | NE | 32 |
| 35 | (Switzerland) Juliana Suter | x | x | 18 | 7 | 0 | 0 | 0 | 0 | DNS | 2 | 0 | NE | 27 |
| 36 | (Canada) Stefanie Fleckenstein | x | x | 0 | 0 | 0 | 0 | 0 | 0 | DNS | 8 | 12 | NE | 20 |
| | (Canada) Marie-Michèle Gagnon | x | x | 7 | 6 | 3 | 4 | DNF | DNS | | | | NE | 20 |
| 38 | (Andorra) Cande Moreno | x | x | DNF | 0 | 10 | DNF | 0 | DNF | ㉒ | 0 | 6 | NE | 16 |
| 39 | (United States) Tricia Mangan | x | x | 0 | DNS | 14 | 0 | 0 | 0 | ㉓ | 1 | 0 | NE | 15 |
| | (Austria) Nicole Schmidhofer | x | x | 12 | 0 | DNS | 0 | DNS | 3 | DNS | | | NE | 15 |
| 41 | (Slovakia) Petra Vlhová | x | x | DNS | | | DNF | DNS | | | 9 | DNS | | 9 |
| 42 | (Italy) Karoline Pichler | x | x | 0 | 0 | 8 | DNF | DNF | 0 | DNS | DNF | DNS | NE | 8 |
| 43 | (Austria) Nadine Fest | x | x | DNS | 0 | DNS | | 7 | 0 | DNS | 0 | 0 | NE | 7 |
| 44 | (United States) Keely Cashman | x | x | 0 | 0 | 0 | 0 | 0 | 4 | DNS | 0 | 2 | NE | 6 |
| 45 | (Switzerland) Janine Schmitt | x | x | DNS | | | | 0 | 5 | DNS | | | NE | 5 |
| 46 | (Germany) Katrin Hirtl-Stanggaßinger | x | x | DNS | | 4 | 0 | 0 | DNF | DNS | 0 | 0 | NE | 4 |
| 47 | (Austria) Franziska Gritsch | x | x | DNS | | 0 | DNF | DNS | | | | 3 | NE | 3 |
| | (Bosnia and Herzegovina) Elvedina Muzaferija | x | x | 0 | 0 | 0 | 0 | 0 | 3 | ⑳ | DNF | 0 | NE | 3 |
| 49 | (France) Anouck Errard | x | x | DNS | | 0 | 0 | 0 | 1 | ㉑ | 0 | DNS | NE | 1 |
| | (United States) Lauren Macuga | x | x | DNS | | 1 | 0 | DNS | | | 0 | 0 | NE | 1 |
| | References | | | | | | | | | | | | | |

=== Legend ===
- Winner (100 points)
- 2nd place (80 points)
- 3rd place (60 points)
- DNF = Did not finish
- DSQ = Disqualified
- Did not start (DNS)
- Not eligible for finals (NE)
- Race canceled (x)
- FIS non-World Cup race (World Championships)
- Updated at 15 March 2023, after all events.

== See also ==
- 2023 Alpine Skiing World Cup – Women's summary rankings
- 2023 Alpine Skiing World Cup – Women's overall
- 2023 Alpine Skiing World Cup – Women's super-G
- 2023 Alpine Skiing World Cup – Women's giant slalom
- 2023 Alpine Skiing World Cup – Women's slalom
- World Cup scoring system
