= 2023 Alpine Skiing World Cup – Women's super-G =

Alpine ski discipline year standings

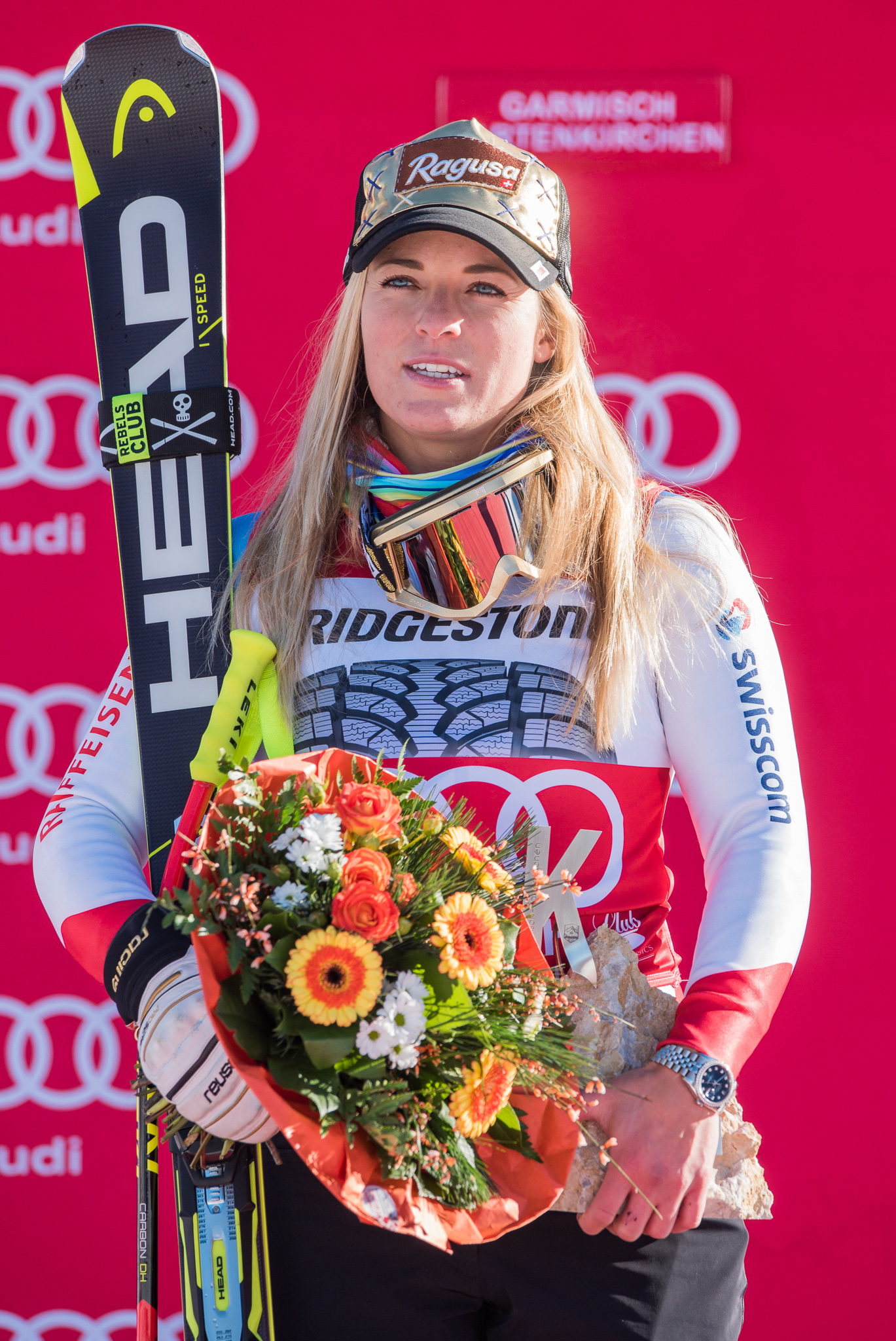
2023 Women's super-G World Cup: Lara Gut-Behrami of Switzerland, season champion; 2023 Women's World Cup; Overall • Downhill • Super-G; Giant slalom • Slalom
Previous: 2022	Next: 2024

The women's super-G in the 2023 FIS Alpine Skiing World Cup included eight events, including the final. The original schedule called for nine events, but a scheduled downhill at St. Anton on 14 January was converted to a super-G due to the inability to hold pre-race practice runs on either of the two days prior to the event. A later super-G at Cortina was converted into a downhill to restore the original schedule balance, but then a downhill at Crans Montana on 25 February had to be delayed a day due to fog and dangerous course conditions, and the super-G previously scheduled for that day was cancelled and not rescheduled.

After seven events, there had been seven different race winners from five different countries. The seventh race, in Kvitfjell, was particularly unusual because it started during a blizzard, but conditions eased for the later starters; the entire podium (all Austrians) had starting positions located after the break taken after the top skiers in the discipline had finished (the first 22 positions).

Going into the eighth race (the World Cup final), last season's Super-G runner-up, Elena Curtoni of Italy, held a narrow lead in the discipline standings, although the top five (Curtoni, Lara Gut-Behrami, Ragnhild Mowinckel, Cornelia Hütter, and defending discipline champion Federica Brignone) were separated by only 44 points. That final was won by Gut-Behrami (with Brignone second and Mowinckel third), who thus became the only two-time winner in Super-G for the season and repeated as discipline champion for the fourth time (along with 2014, 2016, and 2021).

The season was interrupted by the 2023 World Ski Championships in the linked resorts of Courchevel and Méribel, France from 6–19 February 2023. Although the Alpine Skiing branch of the International Ski Federation (FIS) conducts both the World Cup and the World Championships, the World Championships are organized by nation (a maximum of four skiers is generally permitted per nation), and (after 1970) the results count only for World Championship medals, not for World Cup points. Accordingly, the results in the World Championship are highlighted in blue and shown in this table by ordinal position only in each discipline. The women's super-G was held in Méribel on 8 February.

The World Cup final took place on Thursday, 16 March in Soldeu, Andorra. Only the top 25 skiers in the World Cup Super-G discipline and the winner of the Junior World Championship, plus any skiers who have scored at least 500 points in the World Cup overall classification for the season, were eligible to compete in the final, and only the top 15 earned World Cup points. The only "500-point" skiers in the race were Ilka Štuhec of Slovenia and Petra Vlhová of Slovakia, who did not earn points.

== Standings ==
	Venue	4 Dec 2022; Lake Louise	18 Dec 2022; St. Moritz	14 Jan 2023; St. Anton	15 Jan 2023; St. Anton	22 Jan 2023; Cortina d'Ampezzo	8 Feb 2023; Méribel WC	26 Feb 2023; Crans Montana	3 Mar 2023; Kvitfjell	5 Mar 2023; Kvitfjell	16 Mar 2023; Soldeu	
#	Skier	(Canada)	(Switzerland)	(Austria)	(Austria)	(Italy)	(France)	(Switzerland)	(Norway)	(Norway)	(Andorra)	Total
	(Switzerland) Lara Gut-Behrami	DNF	32	60	100	50	⑥	x	60	11	100	413
2	(Italy) Federica Brignone	5	24	100	80	24	⑧	x	45	10	80	368
3	(Norway) Ragnhild Mowinckel	60	40	40	32	100	⑤	x	18	16	60	366
4	(Italy) Elena Curtoni	40	80	20	50	40	⑮	x	80	22	26	358
5	(Austria) Cornelia Hütter	80	DNF	29	DNF	80	③	x	100	18	40	347
6	(Switzerland) Corinne Suter	100	16	16	26	DNS	⑳	x	29	22	50	259
7	(United States) Mikaela Shiffrin	DNS	100	DNS		36	②	x	50	36	18	240
8	(Italy) Marta Bassino	16	DNF	32	60	60	①	x	DNS		32	200
9	(Switzerland) Michelle Gisin	24	50	DNF	40	26	⑩	x	13	0	45	198
10	(Austria) Mirjam Puchner	50	36	24	15	32	⑲	x	32	DNF	0	189
11	(Italy) Sofia Goggia	45	45	DNF	DNS		⑪	x	DNF	50	36	176
12	(France) Tessa Worley	14	13	50	22	11	⑨	x	40	0	22	172
13	(Switzerland) Joana Hählen	11	20	80	DNF	22	⑬	x	11	6	16	166
14	(Austria) Stephanie Venier	15	6	12	11	10	DNS	x	29	80	0	163
15	(France) Romane Miradoli	20	60	0	36	45	⑯	x	DNS			161
16	(Switzerland) Jasmine Flury	26	12	11	24	DNF	㉒	x	24	40	20	157
17	(Germany) Kira Weidle	22	DNF	36	13	29	㉓	x	22	29	DNF	151
18	(Austria) Ramona Siebenhofer	36	26	9	45	18	⑰	x	15	0	0	149
19	(Austria) Nicole Schmidhofer	18	29	10	29	14	DNS	x	20	0	0	120
20	(Austria) Nina Ortlieb	DNF	DNF	DNF	5	DNS	DNS	x	2	100	0	107
21	(Norway) Kajsa Vickhoff Lie	13	10	DNF	16	13	③	x	12	13	29	106
22	(France) Laura Gauché	DNF	22	26	DNF	15	⑭	x	10	0	24	97
23	(Austria) Franziska Gritsch	DNS				0	DNS	x	36	60	0	96
24	(Switzerland) Wendy Holdener	DNS	10	DNS		18	DNS	x	14	32	0	74
25	(New Zealand) Alice Robinson	13	18	22	DNF	9	⑦	x	10	DNF	DNF	72
26	(Austria) Tamara Tippler	9	7	45	DNF	7	㉑	x	DNF	3	NE	71
	(Italy) Laura Pirovano	29	3	15	8	0	DNS	x	16	DNF	NE	71
28	(Germany) Emma Aicher	10	0	DNF	DNF	DNS	⑱	x	4	45	NE	59
29	(Canada) Marie-Michèle Gagnon	32	DNF	5	20	DNF	DNS				NE	57
30	(Slovenia) Ilka Štuhec	2	14	DNF	DNS	20	⑫	x	0	15	0	51
31	(Switzerland) Priska Nufer	1	11	DNF	18	6	DNS	x	8	0	NE	44
32	(Italy) Roberta Melesi	DNF	1	15	10	4	DNS	x	6	4	NE	40
33	(Austria) Nadine Fest	4	5	4	DNS	0	DNS	x	1	24	NE	38
34	(Italy) Karoline Pichler	0	0	13	9	12	DNS	x	DNS		NE	34
35	(Switzerland) Stephanie Jenal	DNF	0	1	DNF	5	DNS	x	0	26	NE	32
36	(Canada) Valérie Grenier	0	DNF	8	7	8	DNF	x	7	DNF	NE	30
37	(Austria) Christina Ager	0	4	0	6	0	DNS	x	5	14	NE	29
38	(United States) Breezy Johnson	8	0	2	DNF	2	㉔	x	3	12	NE	27
39	(Switzerland) Juliana Suter	4	2	18	DNF	DNF	DNS	x	0	DNS	NE	24
40	(Austria) Ricarda Haaser	DNS		7	14	1	DNS				NE	22
	(United States) Isabella Wright	7	DNF	3	12	DNF	DNF	x	DNF	DNF	NE	22
42	(Austria) Ariane Rädler	6	15	DNS							NE	21
43	(France) Karen Smadja-Clément	DNS	8	6	4	DNF	DNF	x	DNF	0	NE	18
44	(Italy) Nicol Delago	0	DNF	DNF	DNF	4	DNS	x	0	5	NE	9
	(Austria) Elisabeth Reisinger	DNS							0	9	NE	9
46	(France) Camille Cerutti	DNS		DNF	DNF	0	DNS	x	DNF	8	NE	8
47	(Switzerland) Delia Durrer	DNF	DNS	DNF	DNF	DNF	DNS	x	0	7	NE	7
48	(Bosnia and Herzegovina) Elvedina Muzaferija	0	DNF	DNF	3	0	㉕	x	0	DNS	NE	3
49	(Germany) Katrin Hirtl-Stanggaßinger	DNS		0	DNF	0	DNS	x	0	2	NE	2
50	(Poland) Maryna Gąsienica-Daniel	DNS	0	DNS		0	DNF	x	0	1	NE	1
	References											

=== Legend ===
- Winner (100 points)
- 2nd place (80 points)
- 3rd place (60 points)
- DNF = Did Not Finish
- DSQ = Disqualified
- Did Not Start (DNS)
- Not Eligible for finals (NE)
- Race canceled (x)
- FIS non-World Cup race (World Championships)
- Updated at 16 March 2023, after all events.

== See also ==
- 2023 Alpine Skiing World Cup – Women's summary rankings
- 2023 Alpine Skiing World Cup – Women's overall
- 2023 Alpine Skiing World Cup – Women's downhill
- 2023 Alpine Skiing World Cup – Women's giant slalom
- 2023 Alpine Skiing World Cup – Women's slalom
- World Cup scoring system
