= 2020 Alpine Skiing World Cup – Women's super-G =

Alpine ski discipline year standings

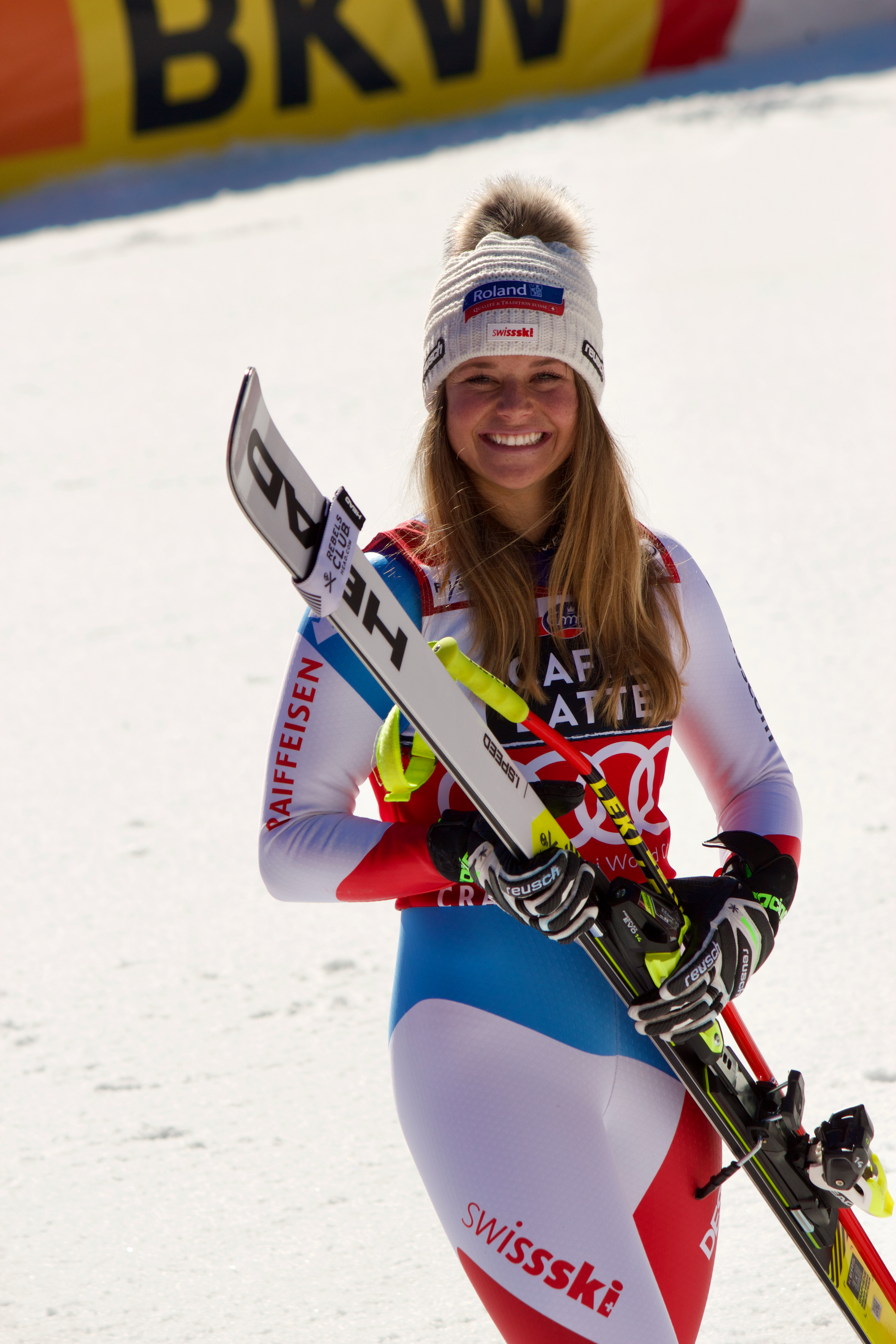
2020 Women's super-G World Cup: Corinne Suter of Switzerland, season champion; 2020 Women's World Cup; Overall • downhill • super-G; giant slalom • slalom; combined • parallel
Previous: 2019	Next: 2021

The women's super-G in the 2020 FIS Alpine Skiing World Cup involved 6 events, which produced six different winners from five countries.

Defending champion Mikaela Shiffrin from the United States was leading the discipline standings when her father Jeff suffered what proved to be a fatal head injury at the start of February; Shiffrin immediately went home to Colorado and ended up missing the remainder of the season. Eventually, Swiss skier Corinne Suter, who held a slim 19-point lead over Federica Brignone of Italy with just the finals remaining, won the discipline title for 2020 when the finals, scheduled for Thursday, 19 March in Cortina d'Ampezzo, Italy, were cancelled due to the COVID-19 pandemic in Italy.

== Standings ==
#	Skier	08 Dec 2019; Lake Louise (Canada)	14 Dec 2019; St. Moritz (Switzerland)	26 Jan 2020; Bansko (Bulgaria)	02 Feb 2020; Rosa Khutor (Russia)	09 Feb 2020; Garmisch-Partenkirchen (Germany)	29 Feb 2020; La Thuile (Italy)	19 Mar 2020; Cortina d'Ampezzo (Italy)	Total
	(Switzerland) Corinne Suter	60	40	50	50	100	60	x	360
2	(Italy) Federica Brignone	36	80	DNF	100	45	80	x	341
3	(Austria) Nicole Schmidhofer	32	50	20	24	80	11	x	217
4	(Switzerland) Lara Gut-Behrami	22	45	60	40	16	26	x	209
5	(Austria) Stephanie Venier	50	18	32	45	40	20	x	205
6	(Austria) Nina Ortlieb	DNF	40	29	22	DNF	100	x	191
7	(United States) Mikaela Shiffrin	26	60	100	DNS			x	186
8	(Italy) Sofia Goggia	DNF	100	DNS	80	DNF	DNS	x	180
	(Germany) Viktoria Rebensburg	100	26	22	32	DNF	DNS	x	180
10	(Italy) Marta Bassino	DNS	13	80	DNS	26	45	x	164
11	(Italy) Elena Curtoni	15	16	36	20	20	36	x	143
12	(France) Romane Miradoli	14	15	24	29	32	24	x	138
13	(Switzerland) Joana Hählen	DNF	0	14	60	24	32	x	130
14	(Slovakia) Petra Vlhová	DNS		40	DNS	29	50	x	119
15	(Switzerland) Wendy Holdener	DNS	22	DNS		60	29	x	111
16	(Liechtenstein) Tina Weirather	29	DNF	45	DNF	5	18	x	97
17	(Switzerland) Michelle Gisin	9	22	3	DNS	36	22	x	92
18	(Austria) Tamara Tippler	40	24	DNF	11	7	6	x	88
19	(Italy) Nicol Delago	80	7	DNF	DNF	DNS	0	x	87
20	(Norway) Kajsa Vickhoff Lie	18	40	16	10	DNF	DNS	x	84
21	(Czech Republic) Ester Ledecká	1	0	DNS	26	14	40	x	81
22	(Italy) Francesca Marsaglia	13	14	DNF	18	15	16	x	76
23	(France) Tiffany Gauthier	DNS		10	13	50	DNF	x	73
24	(Austria) Anna Veith	DNS	5	26	36	DNF	DNS	x	67
25	(Austria) Mirjam Puchner	45	6	4	6	3	DNS	x	64
	References								

- Winner
- 2nd place
- 3rd place
- DNF = Did Not Finish
- DNS = Did Not Start
- Updated at 18 March 2020, after all events.

== See also ==
- 2020 Alpine Skiing World Cup – Women's summary rankings
- 2020 Alpine Skiing World Cup – Women's overall
- 2020 Alpine Skiing World Cup – Women's downhill
- 2020 Alpine Skiing World Cup – Women's giant slalom
- 2020 Alpine Skiing World Cup – Women's slalom
- 2020 Alpine Skiing World Cup – Women's combined
- 2020 Alpine Skiing World Cup – Women's Parallel
- World Cup scoring system
