= 2020 Alpine Skiing World Cup – Women's combined =

Alpine ski discipline year standings

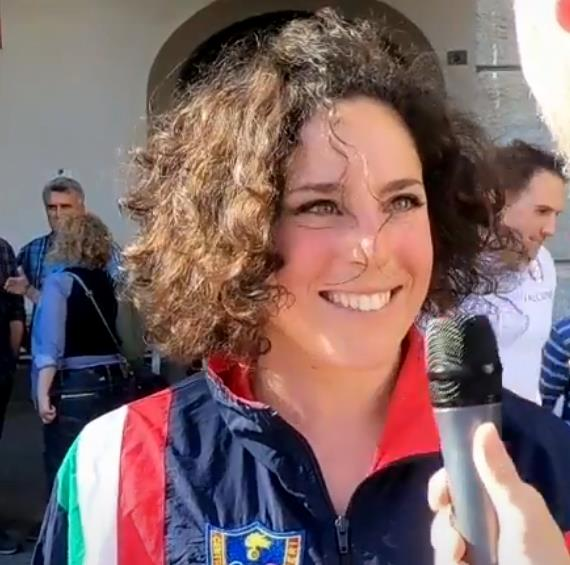
2020 Women's combined World Cup: Federica Brignone of Italy, season champion; 2020 Women's World Cup; Overall • downhill • Super-G; giant slalom • Slalom; Combined • Parallel
Previous: 2019	Next: 2021

The Women's Combined in the 2020 Alpine Skiing World Cup involved two events, although four had been scheduled. A combined at Val d'Isère, France on 22 December 2019 was cancelled due to heavy snowfall, which forced the downhill scheduled for the day before to be shifted back a day, and a combined at La Thuile, Italy on 1 March was also cancelled due to heavy snowfall the challenge in rescheduling during the COVID-19 pandemic (in fact, no more races were held this season).

A major change was made in the discipline this season due to the recent dominance of slalom specialists in the combined over speed racers (downhill/Super G). As was previously the case, the first run continued to be the speed discipline (with Super-G having the preference over downhill). The second run (the slalom) then started in reverse order of finish in the speed run, which allowed the slalom specialists (who tended to be significantly slower in the speed run) to tackle fresh snow as the first down the hill in the slalom run, while the speed specialists had to face the more challenging rutted snow at the end of the day, as the last skiers of the 30 who qualified for the second run. Instead, the second run was changed to start in the same order as the finish of the speed run, so that the leader after the speed run became the first to race on the fresh slalom course.

Both of the combined races held were won by Federica Brignone of Italy, who thus won the season championship (and the crystal globe, which was awarded by FIS jury vote despite the two cancellations). At this time, combined races were not included in the season finals, which were scheduled in 2020 in Cortina d'Ampezzo, Italy (but were not held due to the pandemic).

== Standings ==
#	Skier	22 Dec 2019; Val d'Isère (France)	12 Jan 2020; Altenmarkt-Zauchensee (Austria)	23 Feb 2020; Crans Montana (Switzerland)	1 Mar 2020; La Thuile (Italy)	Total
	(Italy) Federica Brignone	x	100	100	x	200
2	(Switzerland) Wendy Holdener	x	80	45	x	125
3	(Czech Republic) Ester Ledecká	x	40	60	x	100
4	(Austria) Franziska Gritsch	x	DNS	80	x	80
5	(Austria) Ramona Siebenhofer	x	50	14	x	64
6	(Italy) Marta Bassino	x	60	DNF1	x	60
7	(Canada) Roni Remme	x	22	36	x	58
8	(Switzerland) Michelle Gisin	x	DNF1	50	x	50
9	(Austria) Nina Ortlieb	x	24	24	x	48
10	(Italy) Elena Curtoni	x	45	DNF2	x	45
11	(Switzerland) Rahel Kopp	x	14	29	x	43
12	(Slovenia) Maruša Ferk	x	DNS	40	x	40
	(United States) Alice Merryweather	x	8	32	x	40
14	(France) Romane Miradoli	x	36	DNF2	x	36
15	(Switzerland) Nathalie Gröbli	x	32	DNS	x	32
16	(France) Tifany Roux	x	16	15	x	31
17	(Sweden) Ida Dannewitz	x	29	DNS	x	29
	(Serbia) Nevena Ignjatović	x	11	18	x	29
19	(Austria) Elisabeth Reisinger	x	26	DNS	x	26
	(Italy) Laura Pirovano	x	DNS	26	x	26
21	(Switzerland) Priska Nufer	x	DNF1	22	x	22
	(Austria) Lisa Grill	x	12	10	x	22
23	(Austria) Ricarda Haaser	x	20	DNS	x	20
	(Switzerland) Jasmina Suter	x	DNF1	20	x	20
25	(Austria) Rosina Schneeberger	x	18	DNS	x	18
	References					

- Winner
- 2nd place
- 3rd place
- DNF1 = Did not finish run 1
- DNF2 = Did not finish run 2
- DNS = Did not start
- Updated at 22 March 2020, after all events.

== See also ==
- 2020 Alpine Skiing World Cup – Women's summary rankings
- 2020 Alpine Skiing World Cup – Women's overall
- 2020 Alpine Skiing World Cup – Women's downhill
- 2020 Alpine Skiing World Cup – Women's super-G
- 2020 Alpine Skiing World Cup – Women's giant slalom
- 2020 Alpine Skiing World Cup – Women's slalom
- 2020 Alpine Skiing World Cup – Women's parallel
- World Cup scoring system
