= 2020 Alpine Skiing World Cup – Women's slalom =

Alpine ski discipline year standings

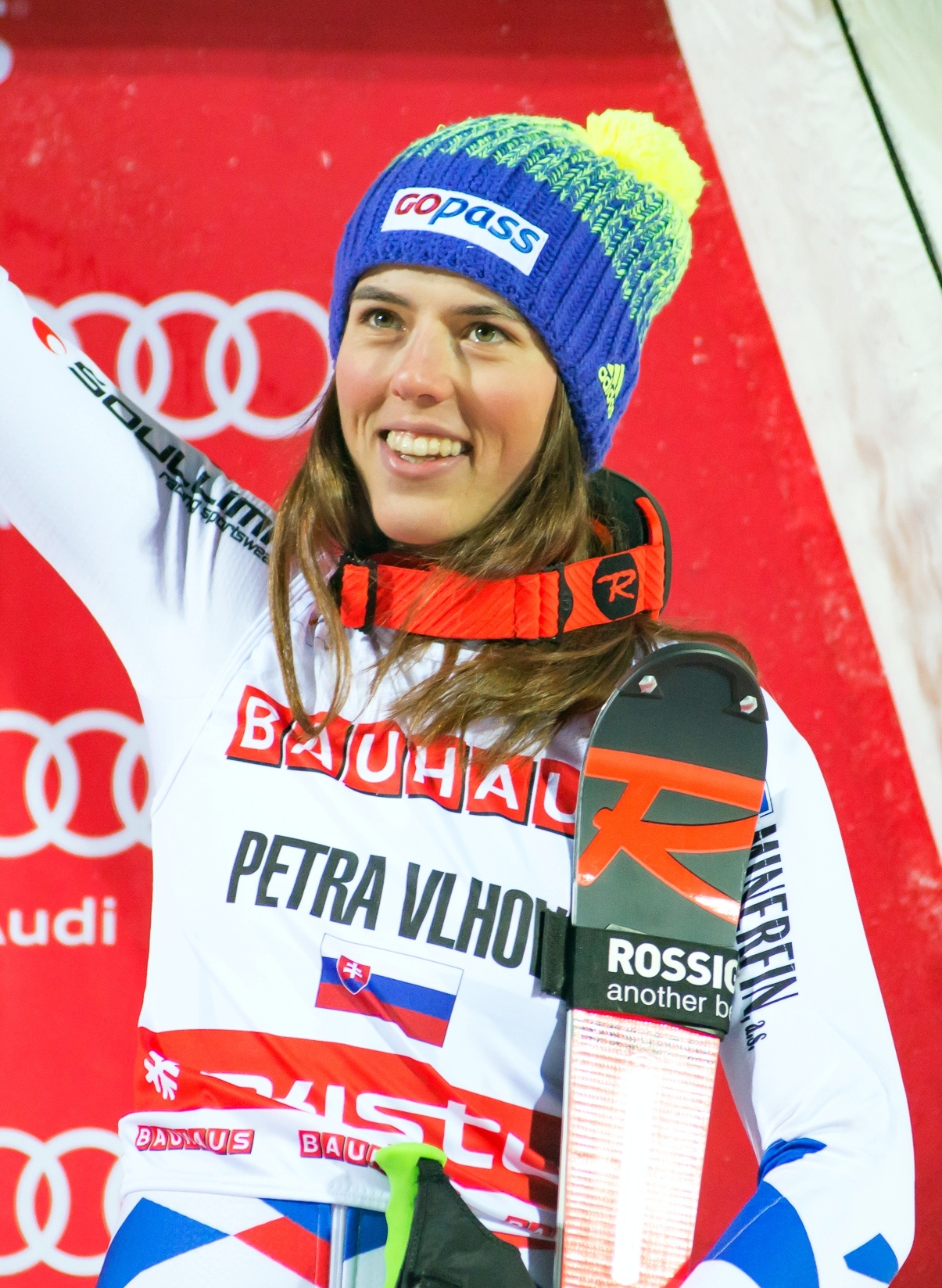
2020 Women's Slalom World Cup: Petra Vlhová of Slovakia, season champion; 2020 Women's World Cup; Overall • downhill • super-G; giant slalom • slalom; combined • parallel
Previous: 2019	Next: 2021

The women's slalom in the 2020 Alpine Skiing World Cup involved 6 events, although there were 9 originally scheduled.

Defending champion Mikaela Shiffrin from the United States was leading the discipline standings by 80 points after 5 events when her father Jeff suffered what proved to be a fatal head injury at the start of February, and Shiffrin immediately left the tour to return home to Colorado, which eventually caused her to miss the remainder of the season. Slovakian skier Petra Vlhová won the next event in Kranjska Gora, Slovenia, to move 20 points ahead of Shiffrin with three events remaining.

But all of the final three events were cancelled. First, the slalom scheduled for Ofterschwang, Germany was canceled due to lack of snow and a bad forecast. Then the finals, scheduled for Saturday, 21 March in Cortina d'Ampezzo, Italy, were cancelled due to the COVID-19 pandemic. And finally, the one remaining slalom, scheduled in Åre, Sweden, for which Shiffrin had planned to return, was canceled due to COVID infections being detected among the skiers. Thus, the current leader in each discipline -- in this case, Vlhová -- automatically became the season winner of the crystal globe for that discipline.

Vlhová thus won the discipline title for the first time.

== Standings ==
#	Skier	23 Nov 2019; Levi (Finland)	1 Dec 2019; Killington (United States)	29 Dec 2019; Lienz (Austria)	4 Jan 2020; Zagreb (Croatia)	14 Jan 2020; Flachau (Austria)	16 Feb 2020; Kranjska Gora (Slovenia)	8 Mar 2020; Ofterschwang (Germany)	14 Mar 2020; Åre (Sweden)	21 Mar 2020; Cortina d'Ampezzo (Italy)	Total
	(Slovakia) Petra Vlhová	DNF2	80	80	100	100	100	x	x	x	460
2	(United States) Mikaela Shiffrin	100	100	100	80	60	DNS	x	x	x	440
3	(Austria) Katharina Liensberger	36	40	50	60	45	45	x	x	x	276
4	(Switzerland) Wendy Holdener	80	DNF2	DSQ2	50	50	80	x	x	x	260
5	(Sweden) Anna Swenn-Larsson	50	60	DNF1	45	80	DNF2	x	x	x	235
6	(Norway) Nina Haver-Løseth	45	45	12	40	36	50	x	x	x	228
7	(Austria) Katharina Truppe	60	DNF1	13	36	40	60	x	x	x	209
	(Switzerland) Michelle Gisin	40	29	60	22	29	29	x	x	x	209
9	(Germany) Christina Ackermann	15	50	45	12	DNF2	7	x	x	x	129
10	(Austria) Chiara Mair	DNQ	22	15	16	32	40	x	x	x	125
11	(Sweden) Emelie Wikström	24	15	8	26	7	36	x	x	x	116
12	(Switzerland) Aline Danioth	13	11	36	32	22	DNS	x	x	x	114
13	(Norway) Kristin Lysdahl	DNF1	24	16	29	5	32	x	x	x	106
14	(Italy) Irene Curtoni	DNQ	26	18	20	20	20	x	x	x	104
15	(Germany) Lena Dürr	26	6	40	6	6	DNF2	x	x	x	84
	(Norway) Mina Fürst Holtmann	22	9	32	10	DNF1	11	x	x	x	84
17	(Sweden) Magdalena Fjällström	DNQ	16	6	15	18	26	x	x	x	81
18	(Canada) Laurence St. Germain	DNQ	DNF2	29	24	26	DNF1	x	x	x	79
19	(Austria) Katharina Gallhuber	16	32	DNF2	DNQ	24	DNF1	x	x	x	72
20	(Austria) Katharina Huber	32	DNF2	14	DNF1	10	15	x	x	x	71
21	(Canada) Erin Mielzynski	6	DNF1	22	DNQ	16	18	x	x	x	62
22	(Austria) Franziska Gritsch	18	10	DNF1	11	15	DNF1	x	x	x	54
23	(Slovenia) Meta Hrovat	DNQ	DNF1	26	3	DNF2	24	x	x	x	53
24	(Germany) Marlene Schmotz	9	18	24	DNF1	DNS		x	x	x	51
25	(Canada) Roni Remme	DNQ	36	DNF2	DNQ	DNS	14	x	x	x	50
	References										

- Winner
- 2nd place
- 3rd place
- DNF1 = Did Not Finish run 1
- DNQ = Did not qualify for run 2
- DNF2 = Did Not Finish run 2
- DSQ2 = Disqualified run 2
- DNS = Did not start
- Updated at 22 March 2020, after all events.

== See also ==
- 2020 Alpine Skiing World Cup – Women's summary rankings
- 2020 Alpine Skiing World Cup – Women's overall
- 2020 Alpine Skiing World Cup – Women's downhill
- 2020 Alpine Skiing World Cup – Women's super-G
- 2020 Alpine Skiing World Cup – Women's giant slalom
- 2020 Alpine Skiing World Cup – Women's combined
- 2020 Alpine Skiing World Cup – Women's parallel
- World Cup scoring system
