= 2020 Alpine Skiing World Cup – Women's downhill =

Alpine ski discipline year standings

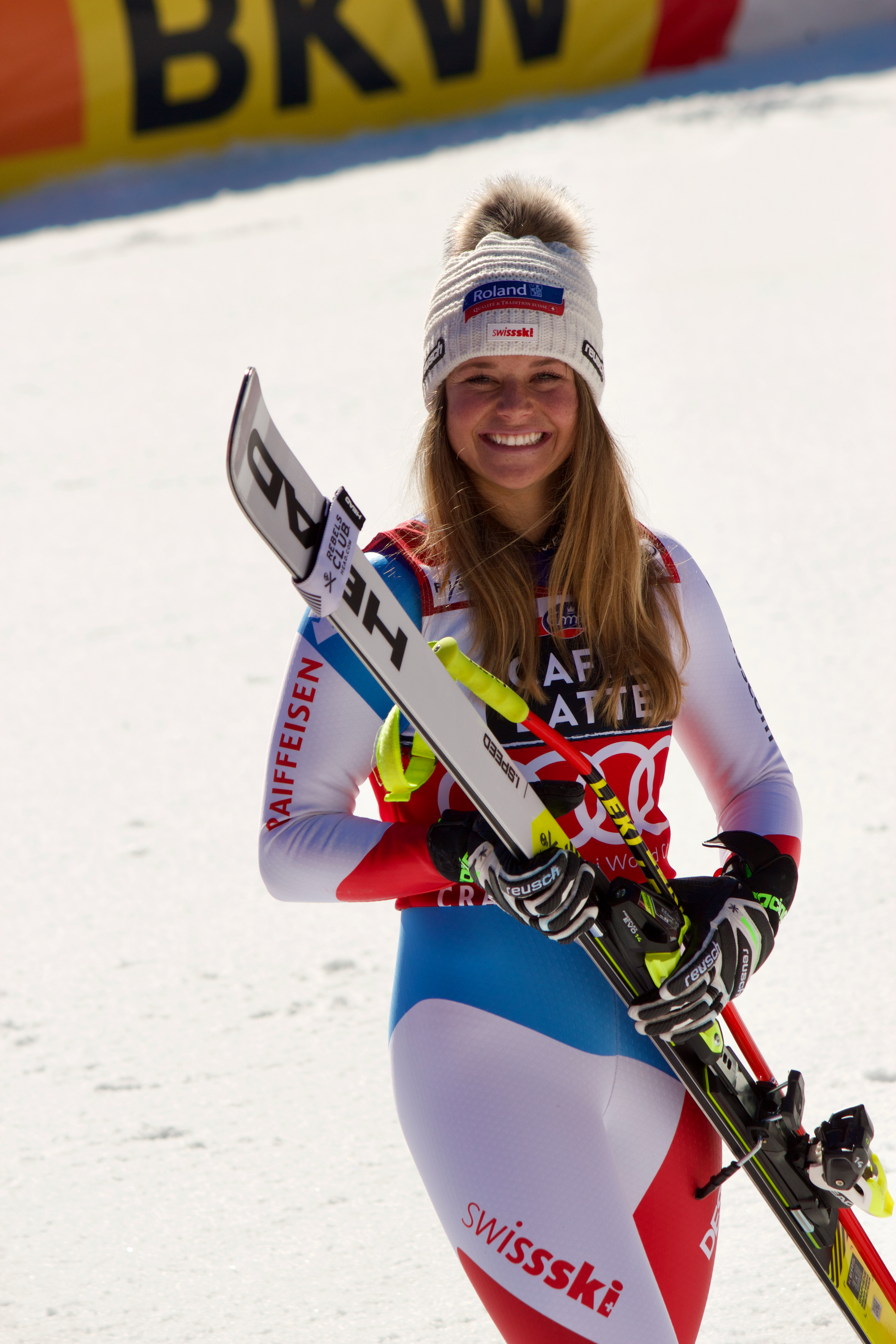
2020 Women's downhill World Cup: Corinne Suter of Switzerland, season champion; 2020 Women's World Cup; Overall • Downhill • Super-G; giant slalom • Slalom; combined • Parallel
Previous: 2019	Next: 2021

The women's downhill in the 2020 FIS Alpine Skiing World Cup involved 8 events, with only one canceled.

Swiss skier Corinne Suter clinched the discipline title for 2020 after the eighth race, with just the finals to be completed. Thus, when the finals, scheduled for Wednesday, 18 March in Cortina d'Ampezzo, Italy, were cancelled due to the COVID-19 pandemic in Italy, downhill was the only women's discipline championship not affected.

== Standings ==
#	Skier	6 Dec 2019; Lake Louise (Canada)	7 Dec 2019; Lake Louise (Canada)	11 Jan 2020; Altenmarkt-Zauchensee (Austria)	24 Jan 2020; Bansko (Bulgaria)	25 Jan 2020; Bansko (Bulgaria)	8 Feb 2020; Garmisch-Partenkirchen (Germany)	21 Feb 2020; Crans-Montana (Switzerland)	22 Feb 2020; Crans-Montana (Switzerland)	18 Mar 2020; Cortina d'Ampezzo (Italy)	Total
	(Switzerland) Corinne Suter	80	45	100	18	29	45	80	80	x	477
2	(Czech Republic) Ester Ledecká	100	50	32	11	0	60	24	45	x	322
3	(Italy) Federica Brignone	DNS		14	80	60	80	36	50	x	320
4	(Switzerland) Lara Gut-Behrami	16	4	26	DNF	26	16	100	100	x	288
5	(United States) Mikaela Shiffrin	26	80	DNS	100	50	DNS			x	256
6	(Italy) Elena Curtoni	13	13	9	50	100	11	26	24	x	246
7	(Austria) Stephanie Venier	60	DNF	29	14	8	22	60	40	x	233
	(Austria) Nina Ortlieb	50	22	16	DNF	32	13	40	60	x	233
9	(Austria) Nicole Schmidhofer	36	100	18	DNS	7	15	16	36	x	228
10	(Germany) Viktoria Rebensburg	50	29	8	9	15	100	DNS		x	211
11	(Italy) Marta Bassino	DNS			45	80	20	29	32	x	208
12	(Italy) Francesca Marsaglia	5	60	45	22	13	29	10	15	x	199
13	(Germany) Kira Weidle	32	40	7	32	40	20	9	8	x	188
14	(Switzerland) Joana Hählen	0	14	15	60	DNF	36	36	6	x	167
	(Slovenia) Ilka Štuhec	14	10	36	13	12	40	22	20	x	167
16	(Slovakia) Petra Vlhová	DNS			40	24	32	50	18	x	164
17	(Italy) Sofia Goggia	40	22	50	DNF	DNS	50	DNS		x	162
18	(France) Romane Miradoli	15	36	1	36	16	2	18	29	x	153
19	(Italy) Nicol Delago	29	DNF	80	2	0	0	15	26	x	152
20	(United States) Breezy Johnson	DNS		6	26	45	14	45	DNF	x	136
21	(Austria) Tamara Tippler	22	32	12	DNF	20	8	13	22	x	129
22	(Austria) Ramona Siebenhofer	20	11	24	29	22	DNS	DNF	13	x	119
23	(Liechtenstein) Tina Weirather	10	15	40	5	10	DNS	20	12	x	112
24	(Switzerland) Michelle Gisin	12	16	60	DNF	2	7	DNF	1	x	98
25	(Austria) Elisabeth Reisinger	12	3	20	DNF	36	26	DNF	DNS	x	97
	References										

- Winner
- 2nd place
- 3rd place
- DNF = Did Not Finish
- DNS = Did Not Start
- Updated at 18 March 2020, after all events.

== See also ==
- 2020 Alpine Skiing World Cup – Women's summary rankings
- 2020 Alpine Skiing World Cup – Women's overall
- 2020 Alpine Skiing World Cup – Women's super-G
- 2020 Alpine Skiing World Cup – Women's giant slalom
- 2020 Alpine Skiing World Cup – Women's slalom
- 2020 Alpine Skiing World Cup – Women's combined
- 2020 Alpine Skiing World Cup – Women's parallel
- World Cup scoring system
