= 2020 Alpine Skiing World Cup – Women's overall =

Alpine ski discipline year standings

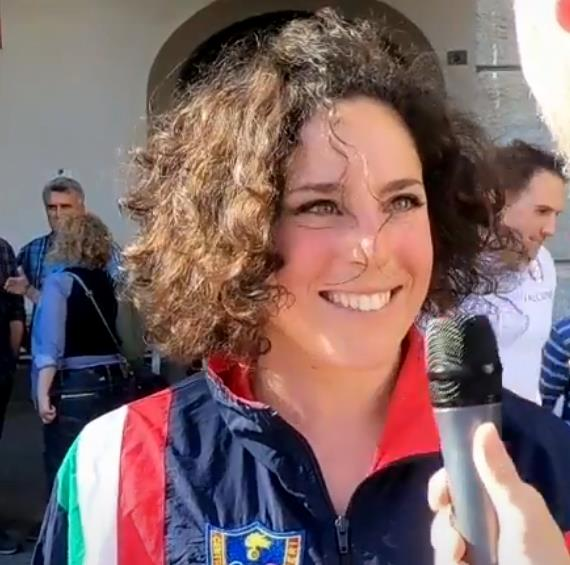
2020 women's overall World Cup: Federica Brignone of Italy, season champion; 2020 women's World Cup; Overall • downhill • super-g; giant slalom • slalom; combined • parallel
Previous: 2019	Next: 2021

The women's overall in the 2020 FIS Alpine Skiing World Cup involved 30 events in 6 disciplines: downhill (DH), Super-G (SG), giant slalom (GS), slalom (SL), Alpine combined (AC), and parallel (PAR). This was the first year that parallel was treated as a separate discipline; prior to the 2019–20 season, it had been a sub-element of the slalom discipline. The season had originally been scheduled to have 41 races (plus one mixed-team race at the World Cup finals), but 11 races that had originally been scheduled (and the mixed-team race) were canceled during the season, mostly due to the COVID-19 pandemic, as discussed below.

As a side note, in a preseason vote FIS voted to change its official designation in the English language (but not in French or German) for female competitors from "Ladies" to "Women". All new FIS documents in English will immediately begin to use the new terminology.

Three-time defending champion Mikaela Shiffrin of the United States had established a significant lead when her father Jeff suffered what proved to be a fatal head injury at the start of February, and Shiffrin missed the remainder of the season. After her departure, the two skiers closest to her in the overall standings, Federica Brignone of Italy and Petra Vlhová of Slovakia, competed in every event remaining in the season, regardless of the discipline, in an attempt to pass Shiffrin.

Brignone grabbed the lead when she won the Alpine combined race in Crans Montana on 23 February and Vlhová, who had been second-fastest in the Super-G leg, straddled a gate in the slalom and didn't score any points. After just one more race six days later, the season was terminated; all of the final ten events were canceled due to a combination of bad weather for the first three and the COVID-19 pandemic for the remainder. As a result, Brignone became the first Italian woman ever to win the women's overall World Cup championship and the crystal globe that comes with it.

== Standings ==
#	Skier	DH; 8 races	SG; 6 races	GS; 6 races	SL; 6 races	AC; 2 races	PAR; 2 races	Total
	(Italy) Federica Brignone	320	341	407	20	200	90	1,378
2	(United States) Mikaela Shiffrin	256	186	314	440	0	29	1,225
3	(Slovakia) Petra Vlhová	164	119	333	460	0	113	1,189
4	(Switzerland) Corinne Suter	477	360	0	0	0	0	837
5	(Italy) Marta Bassino	206	164	309	0	60	78	817
6	(Switzerland) Wendy Holdener	24	111	234	260	125	37	791
7	(Switzerland) Lara Gut-Behrami	288	209	99	0	0	20	616
8	(Switzerland) Michelle Gisin	98	92	142	209	50	0	591
9	(Germany) Viktoria Rebensburg	211	180	160	0	0	5	556
10	(Czech Republic) Ester Ledecká	322	81	0	0	100	0	503
11	(Italy) Sofia Goggia	162	180	82	0	0	55	479
12	(Austria) Nina Ortlieb	233	191	0	0	48	0	479
13	(Austria) Nicole Schmidhofer	228	217	0	0	0	0	445
14	(Austria) Stephanie Venier	233	205	0	0	0	0	438
15	(Italy) Elena Curtoni	246	143	0	0	45	0	434
16	(Austria) Katharina Liensberger	0	0	108	276	0	17	401
17	(France) Romane Miradoli	153	138	3	0	36	0	330
18	(Sweden) Anna Swenn-Larsson	0	0	0	235	0	80	315
19	(New Zealand) Alice Robinson	0	0	300	0	7	3	310
20	(Norway) Mina Fürst Holtmann	0	0	212	84	0	10	306
21	(Switzerland) Joana Hählen	167	130	0	0	0	0	297
22	(Austria) Katharina Truppe	0	0	59	209	0	26	294
23	(Norway) Nina Haver-Løseth	0	0	26	228	0	36	290
24	(Italy) Francesca Marsaglia	199	76	10	0	0	0	285
25	(Slovenia) Meta Hrovat	0	0	168	53	0	58	279

- Leader
- 2nd place
- 3rd place
- Updated at 21 March 2020, after all events

== See also ==
- 2020 Alpine Skiing World Cup – Women's summary rankings
- 2020 Alpine Skiing World Cup – Women's downhill
- 2020 Alpine Skiing World Cup – Women's super-G
- 2020 Alpine Skiing World Cup – Women's giant slalom
- 2020 Alpine Skiing World Cup – Women's slalom
- 2020 Alpine Skiing World Cup – Women's combined
- 2020 Alpine Skiing World Cup – Women's parallel
- 2020 Alpine Skiing World Cup – Men's overall
- World Cup scoring system
