= 2020 Alpine Skiing World Cup – Women's giant slalom =

Alpine ski discipline year standings

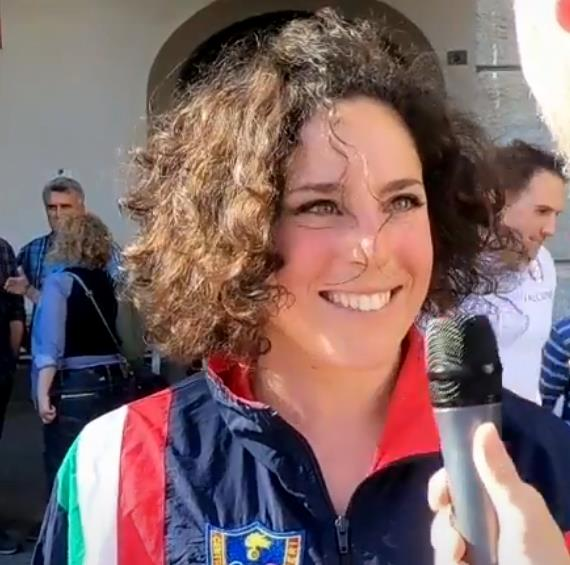
2020 Women's giant slalom World Cup: Federica Brignone of Italy, season champion; 2020 Women's World Cup; Overall • downhill • super-G; giant Slalom • slalom; combined • parallel
Previous: 2019	Next: 2021

The women's giant slalom in the 2020 FIS Alpine Skiing World Cup involved 6 events. The season had been scheduled for nine events, but all of the last three giant slaloms were canceled.

Defending champion Mikaela Shiffrin from the United States was second in the very tight discipline standings after 5 events when her father Jeff suffered what proved to be a fatal head injury at the start of February, and Shiffrin missed the remainder of the season. Italian skier Federica Brignone held the discipline lead with three events remaining, but (as described below) none of those events took place.

First, the GS scheduled for Ofterschwang, Germany was canceled due to lack of snow and a bad forecast. Then the finals, scheduled for Sunday, 22 March in Cortina d'Ampezzo, Italy, were cancelled due to the COVID-19 pandemic. And finally, the one remaining giant slalom, scheduled in Åre, Sweden, for which Shiffrin had planned to return, was canceled due to COVID infections being detected among the skiers. Thus, the current leader in each discipline automatically became the season winner of the crystal globe for that discipline.

== Standings ==
#	Skier	26 Oct 2019; Sölden (Austria)	30 Nov 2019; Killington (United States)	17 Dec 2019; Courchevel (France)	28 Dec 2019; Lienz (Austria)	18 Jan 2020; Sestriere (Italy)	15 Feb 2020; Kranjska Gora (Slovenia)	7 Mar 2020; Ofterschwang (Germany)	13 Mar 2020; Åre (Sweden)	22 Mar 2020; Cortina d'Ampezzo (Italy)	Total
	(Italy) Federica Brignone	45	80	100	50	100	32	x	x	x	407
2	(Slovakia) Petra Vlhová	18	40	50	45	100	80	x	x	x	333
3	(United States) Mikaela Shiffrin	80	60	14	100	60	DNS	x	x	x	314
4	(Italy) Marta Bassino	22	100	36	80	26	45	x	x	x	309
5	(New Zealand) Alice Robinson	100	DNF1	26	29	45	100	x	x	x	300
6	(Switzerland) Wendy Holdener	16	32	60	16	50	60	x	x	x	234
7	(Norway) Mina Fürst Holtmann	50	29	80	40	DNF1	13	x	x	x	212
8	(France) Tessa Worley	60	45	24	32	DNS	29	x	x	x	190
9	(Slovenia) Meta Hrovat	DNF2	26	18	24	40	60	x	x	x	168
10	(Germany) Viktoria Rebensburg	20	36	50	18	36	DNS	x	x	x	160
11	(Switzerland) Michelle Gisin	29	50	2	10	15	36	x	x	x	142
12	(Sweden) Sara Hector	14	DNQ	40	26	32	26	x	x	x	138
13	(Austria) Katharina Liensberger	DNS	DNQ	10	60	14	24	x	x	x	108
14	(Switzerland) Lara Gut-Behrami	32	12	20	7	8	20	x	x	x	99
15	(Slovenia) Tina Robnik	24	7	6	5	16	40	x	x	x	98
16	(Norway) Maria Therese Tviberg	40	DNF2	32	15	6	DNF1	x	x	x	93
17	(France) Coralie Frasse Sombet	DNQ	20	22	20	24	DNS	x	x	x	86
18	(France) Clara Direz	DNQ	18	DNF1	36	20	9	x	x	x	83
19	(Italy) Sofia Goggia	DNQ	24	15	14	29	DNS	x	x	x	82
20	(Sweden) Estelle Alphand	DNQ	22	DNQ	24	18	DNF1	x	x	x	64
21	(Austria) Franziska Gritsch	36	DNQ	DNQ	12	DNQ	12	x	x	x	60
22	(Austria) Katharina Truppe	12	13	13	7	4	10	x	x	x	59
23	(Switzerland) Andrea Ellenberger	15	6	DNQ	DNF2	10	22	x	x	x	53
24	(Norway) Thea Louise Stjernesund	11	16	11	12	1	DNF1	x	x	x	51
25	(Germany) Marlene Schmotz	DNQ	10	29	9	DNS		x	x	x	48
	References										

- Winner
- 2nd place
- 3rd place
- DNF1 = Did not finish run 1
- DNQ = Did not qualify for run 2
- DNF2 = Did not finish run 2
- DNS = Did not start
- Updated at 22 March 2020, after all events.

== See also ==
- 2020 Alpine Skiing World Cup – Women's summary rankings
- 2020 Alpine Skiing World Cup – Women's overall
- 2020 Alpine Skiing World Cup – Women's downhill
- 2020 Alpine Skiing World Cup – Women's super-G
- 2020 Alpine Skiing World Cup – Women's slalom
- 2020 Alpine Skiing World Cup – Women's combined
- 2020 Alpine Skiing World Cup – Women's parallel
- World Cup scoring system
