= 2026 Alpine Skiing World Cup – Women's downhill =

Alpine ski discipline year standings

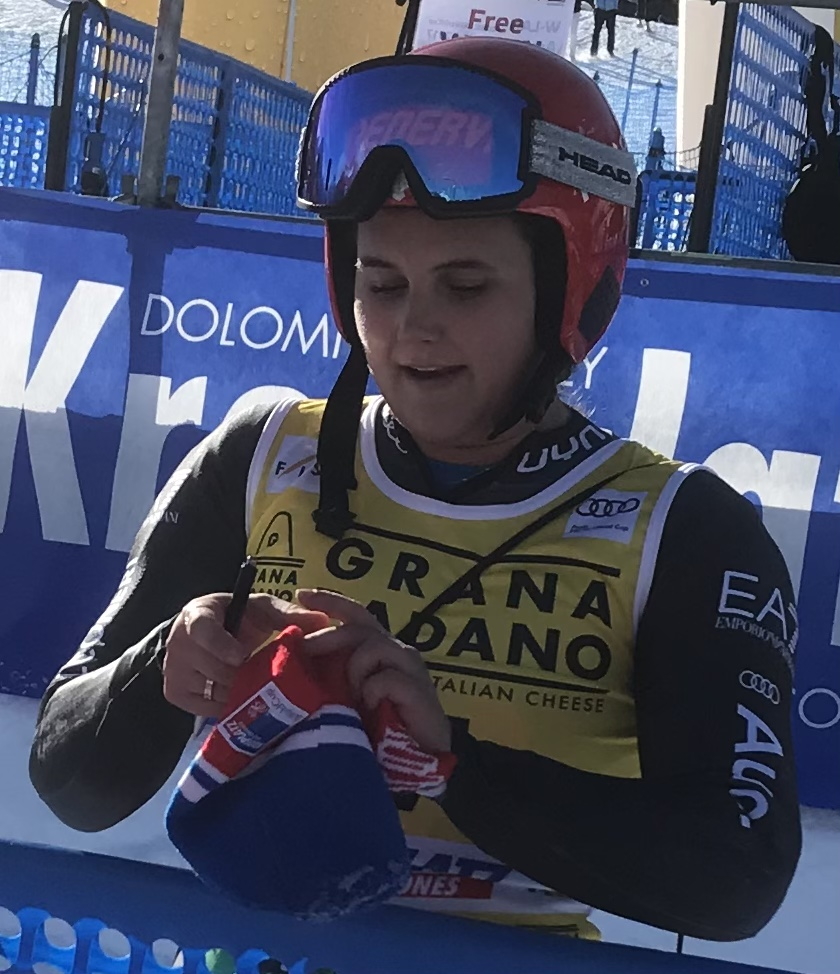
2026 Women's Downhill World Cup: Laura Pirovano of Italy, season champion; 2026 Women's World Cup; Overall • Downhill • Super-G; Giant slalom • Slalom
Previous: 2025	Next: 2027

The women's downhill in the 2026 FIS Alpine Skiing World Cup consisted of nine events, including the final. In a surprise, the season champion was Laura Pirovano from Italy, who won all of the final three races of the season to come from behind and seize the title after leader Lindsey Vonn's season-ending injury at the 2026 Winter Olympics.

The season began with two downhills at St. Moritz, Switzerland on 12 and 13 December 2025 and then to remain in Europe all season, according to the initial schedule released on 12 June 2025. For the first time since 2011, the Di Prampero course in Tarvisio, Italy hosted the World Cup circuit on 17 January 2026; prior to that, the course hosted the 2025 FIS Junior World Championships.

The season was interrupted for the quadrennial 2026 Winter Olympics in three regions in Italy – Milan, the Stelvio Pass, and Cortina d'Ampezzo – during 6–22 February 2026. The Alpine speed skiing events for women took place on the classic Olimpia delle Tofane course at Cortina d'Ampezzo. The championship in women's downhill was held on Sunday, 8 February and was won by Breezy Johnson of the U.S., who finished third in the discipline for the season.

== Season summary ==
Before the opening of the downhill season, the women's field suffered five major losses. First, defending discipline champion Federica Brignone of Italy suffered a complex injury, including a tear of her anterior cruciate ligament (ACL), during the Italian championships in March 2025 that might cost her all of this season. Then, during giant slalom training at Copper Mountain (U.S.) in November, Lara Gut-Behrami of Switzerland and also tore her ACL, a season-ending knee injury. The next day, another training crash on the same slope by rising American speed star Lauren Macuga once again tore her ACL, ending her season as well. After returning to Europe for the official start of the speed season for women at St. Moritz, Switzerland, two more training crashes sidelined two more members of the Swiss team. First, Corinne Suter, the defending Olympic champion in this discipline, tore a muscle in her left calf, bruised her left knee, and fractured a bone in her right foot, and so was forecast to be sidelined until at least mid-January 2026. Then, during the final official pre-race training run, two-time Olympic champion Michelle Gisin crashed and was airlifted to a hospital for spinal surgery; however, this surgery was also not expected to be season-ending.

Finally, in the first of the two St. Moritz downhills, 41-year-old Lindsey Vonn of the United States, who was directly behind Gisin in the final training run and thus was stopped and held on the course during the airlift, won the race by almost a second for her 83rd career victory (44th in downhill) and thus became the oldest race winner, male or female, in World Cup history. The following day in the second downhill, 22-year-old all-discipline German racer Emma Aicher was able to edge Vonn to prevent back-to-back victories, although Vonn did set a new all-time women's record with her 410th World Cup race (breaking the previous record of 409 by Renate Götschl). The next weekend at Val d'Isère, France, 2024 discipline champion Cornelia Hütter of Austria was the best in flat light conditions, edging past Germany's Kira Weidle-Winkelmann, the race's initial starter, and benefitting from mid-race errors by Vonn (who finished third) and Italy's Sofia Goggia, who dropped all the way back to eighth after being forced off the main track, leaving Vonn still in first by 69 points over Aicher.

The downhill season resumed in January 2026 with a shortened course due to heavy snow in Zauchensee, Austria, and Vonn remained on top of the podium by a little over 1/3 of a second over Norway's Kajsa Vickhoff Lie, allowing her to open up a 129-point lead over Aicher in the discipline. The next week, on the long downhill course at Tarvisio, Italy, which was a strong course for downhillers good at gliding, Nicol Delago posted a home-team victory for her first World Cup win, edging out both Weidle-Winkelmann and Vonn, who posted her fifth-straight podium for the season and opened up a 144-point lead over Aicher in the discipline. The season resumed two weeks later at Crans Montana, Switzerland, just nine days before the Olympic downhill, on a day with snowfall and poor visibility, which led to three of the first six racers crashing out, including two – Marte Monsen of Norway and Vonn – who ended up in the netting surrounding the course and needed significant assistance, before the race was canceled. Vonn was airlifted off the course and found to have completely torn her ACL, an injury requiring surgery that would normally be season-ending – but Vonn decided to compete in the Olympics anyway by wearing a knee brace on her non-titanium left knee; meanwhile, the canceled downhill from Crans Montana was rescheduled for Val di Fassa, Italy, on 6 March 2026, the day before an already-scheduled World Cup downhill.

At the Olympic downhill, Vonn's gamble looked sound when she finished third in the final training run, but it quickly backfired the next day when her right shoulder and arm hit a gate while airborne during the race, resulting in a horrendous crash that broke her left leg and required her to be airlifted to a hospital for immediate surgery, thus ending her season. However, her teammate Breezy Johnson, who won the world championship in downhill last year but had missed the 2022 Winter Olympics due to her own crash at Cortina d'Ampezzo during training there, became the second American woman (after Vonn in 2010) to win the Olympic gold in this event, edging Aicher by just 0.04 seconds, with the home country's Goggia completing her complete set of Olympic medals with the bronze (joining her gold from 2018 and her silver from 2022).

When the World Cup downhill season resumed with four races still remaining, Vonn's 144-point lead in the discipline looked certain to be overtaken. But in the next race – on the Àliga course in Soldeu, Andorra – Corinne Suter, the 2020 discipline champion who had just returned from her season-opening injury, edged Austria's Nina Ortlieb for her first World Cup victory in any discipline in over three years (since December 2022), while Aicher (fourth) closed to within 94 points of Vonn. Prior to the next events in Val di Fassa (Italy), Brignone announced that she was ending her season (without competing in any downhills on the World Cup circuit) to permit her to fully recover from her injuries, now that she had achieved her goal of competing in the Olympics (along with winning two gold medals, in super-G and giant slalom). In the first of the two downhills there, Italy's Laura Pirovano, in her ninth World Cup season and skiing on home snow, recorded both her first podium and her first win, edging Aicher by one-one-hundredth of a second (.01), with Johnson in third; Aicher closed to just 14 points behind Vonn -- and 50 up on Pirovano for the discipline lead. Shockingly, the next day Pirovano did it again, this time beating Conny Hütter by .01 seconds and Corinne Suter by .05 seconds, which enabled Pirovano to jump over both Vonn and Aicher (who finished 12th) and grab the discipline lead by 28 points with just the finals remaining.

== Finals ==
The World Cup finals in the downhill discipline took place on Saturday, 21 March 2026 on the Olympiabakken course at Kvitfjell, near Lillehammer, Norway. Only the top 25 skiers in the World Cup downhill discipline and the winner of the 2026 FIS Junior World Championships in the discipline (which was cancelled due to bad weather), plus any skiers who have scored at least 500 points in the World Cup overall classification for the season, were eligible to compete in the final, and only the top 15 earned World Cup points. Two qualifiers (Vonn and Magdalena Egger of Austria) were out for the season with injuries, and one skier with over 500 points (Alice Robinson of New Zealand) registered to compete, so the field consisted of 24. However, the race came down to Pirovano and Johnson (who was not in contention for the season title), with Pirovano prevailing by .15 seconds for her third straight victory and the discipline title for the first time. Johnson edged Weidle-Winklemann (who finished third in the race) for third for the season by two points, with Aicher (who finished fifth) forty points ahead in second.

== Standings ==
	Venue	12 Dec 2025; St. Moritz	13 Dec 2025; St. Moritz	20 Dec 2025; Val d'Isère	10 Jan 2026; Zauchensee	17 Jan 2026; Tarvisio	30 Jan 2026; Crans Montana	8 Feb 2026; Cortina d'Ampezzo	27 Feb 2026; Soldeu	6 Mar 2026; Val di Fassa R#	7 Mar 2026; Val di Fassa	21 Mar 2026; Kvitfjell	
#	Skier	(Switzerland)	(Switzerland)	(France)	(Austria)	(Italy)	(Switzerland)	(Italy)	(Andorra)	(Italy)	(Italy)	(Norway)	Total
	(Italy) Laura Pirovano	32	40	45	50	40	x	⑥	29	100	100	100	536
2	(Germany) Emma Aicher	45	100	26	40	45	x	②	50	80	22	45	453
3	(United States) Breezy Johnson	16	50	36	36	40	x	①	45	60	50	80	413
4	(Germany) Kira Weidle-Winkelmann	32	18	80	22	80	x	⑨	24	50	45	60	411
5	(United States) Lindsey Vonn	100	80	60	100	60	x	DNF	DNS				400
6	(Austria) Cornelia Hütter	40	15	100	11	13	x	④	40	45	80	32	376
7	(Italy) Sofia Goggia	50	60	32	14	24	x	③	60	14	24	29	307
8	(Italy) Nicol Delago	22	0	29	29	100	x	⑪	15	12	29	36	272
9	(Austria) Nina Ortlieb	26	32	24	0	50	x	DNF	80	24	DNF	22	258
10	(Norway) Kajsa Vickhoff Lie	12	13	18	80	18	x	⑦	36	29	36	16	258
11	(Switzerland) Corinne Suter	DNS			9	16	x	⑭	100	32	60	40	257
12	(Austria) Ariane Rädler	24	26	15	7	11	x	⑧	18	40	40	50	231
13	(United States) Jacqueline Wiles	13	11	16	60	20	x	④	32	24	16	18	210
14	(Czech Republic) Ester Ledecká	9	14	40	26	15	x	DNS	26	18	32	29	209
15	(Slovenia) Ilka Štuhec	18	22	50	15	32	x	⑮	16	36	18	0	207
16	(Austria) Mirjam Puchner	60	45	11	2	24	x	⑪	20	9	2	20	193
17	(France) Romane Miradoli	40	16	22	32	14	x	⑯	22	12	15	0	173
18	(Austria) Magdalena Egger	80	36	7	DNF	DNS							123
19	(Norway) Marte Monsen	0	29	20	DNF	29	x	DNS	0	13	29	0	120
20	(Italy) Nadia Delago	0	0	6	13	26	x	DNS	8	15	14	24	106
21	(Italy) Elena Curtoni	0	3	14	26	7	x	DNS	13	26	5	0	94
22	(United States) Allison Mollin	4	9	9	18	12	x	DNS	10	20	10	0	92
23	(Switzerland) Malorie Blanc	20	12	5	20	1	x	⑲	14	6	7	0	85
24	(Switzerland) Janine Schmitt	8	0	0	45	10	x	⑰	DNF	4	5	0	72
25	(Switzerland) Jasmine Flury	1	24	13	0	1	x	⑱	DNS	10	22	0	71
26	(United States) Isabella Wright	15	20	0	DNS	2	x	㉑	0	0	11	NE	48
27	(United States) Keely Cashman	7	10	3	13	0	x	DNS	9	0	0	NE	42
28	(Italy) Roberta Melesi	6	7	0	0	0	x	DNS	DNF	16	8	NE	37
29	(Austria) Nadine Fest	0	1	0	7	0	x	DNS	12	0	12	NE	32
30	(Switzerland) Delia Durrer	0	6	13	0	3	x	DNS	1	6	0	NE	29
31	(France) Camille Cerutti	0	2	0	10	0	x	㉓	3	3	9	NE	27
32	(United States) Haley Cutler	11	0	4	0	8	x	DNS	DNF	0	3	NE	26
33	(France) Laura Gauché	0	5	0	16	0	x	⑬	0	0	1	NE	22
34	(Switzerland) Stefanie Grob	0	0	DNS	0	DNS	x	DNS	DNS	8	13	NE	21
35	(Austria) Ricarda Haaser	DNS				9	x	DNS	12	DNS		NE	21
36	(New Zealand) Alice Robinson	2	DNS	10	5	DNS	x	DNS	4	0	0	DNS	21
37	(Switzerland) Priska Ming-Nufer	0	8	0	0	5	x	DNS	6	DNS		NE	19
38	(Austria) Lena Wechner	11	0	0	0	0	x	DNS	5	0	0	NE	16
39	(Switzerland) Jasmina Suter	15	0	0	0	0	x	DNS	DNS	0	0	NE	15
40	(Italy) Sara Thaler	DSQ	0	0	8	0	DNS	DNS	0	0	6	NE	14
41	(Austria) Christina Ager	4	0	2	0	4	x	DNS	0	DNS		NE	10
42	(Switzerland) Jasmin Mathis	DNS							8	0	0	NE	8
43	(Canada) Valérie Grenier	0	0	8	DNS	0	DNS	DSQ	DNS			NE	8
44	(Switzerland) Joana Hählen	0	5	1	0	0	x	DNS	2	DNS		NE	8
45	(United States) Mary Bocock	DNS			0	DNS	x	DNS	0	7	DNF	NE	7
46	(Austria) Emily Schöpf	0	0	0	0	6	x	DNS	0	DNS		NE	6
47	(Andorra) Cande Moreno	5	0	0	0	0	x	DNF	DNS			NE	5
48	(Norway) Inni Holm Wembstad	0	DNS		4	DNS			DNF	0	DNF	NE	4
49	(Austria) Carmen Spielberger	DNF	DNF	DNS	3	DNS						NE	3
50	(United States) Tricia Mangan	0	0	0	0	DNS	x	DNS	DNF	2	DNF	NE	2
51	(Italy) Asja Zenere	DNS	DNF	DNS			x	DNS	0	1	0	NE	1
52	(Austria) Leonie Zegg	DNS			1	DNS				0	DNF	NE	1
	References												

=== Legend ===
- Winner (100 points)
- 2nd place (80 points)
- 3rd place (60 points)
- DNF = Did not finish
- DSQ = Disqualified
- Did not start (DNS)
- Not eligible for finals (NE)
- Race canceled (x)
- FIS non-World Cup race (Olympics)
- R# = Rescheduled (make-up) race
- Updated on 21 March 2026, after all events.

== See also ==
- 2026 Alpine Skiing World Cup – Women's summary rankings
- 2026 Alpine Skiing World Cup – Women's overall
- 2026 Alpine Skiing World Cup – Women's super-G
- 2026 Alpine Skiing World Cup – Women's giant slalom
- 2026 Alpine Skiing World Cup – Women's slalom
- World Cup scoring system
