= 2026 Alpine Skiing World Cup – Women's overall =

Alpine ski discipline year standings

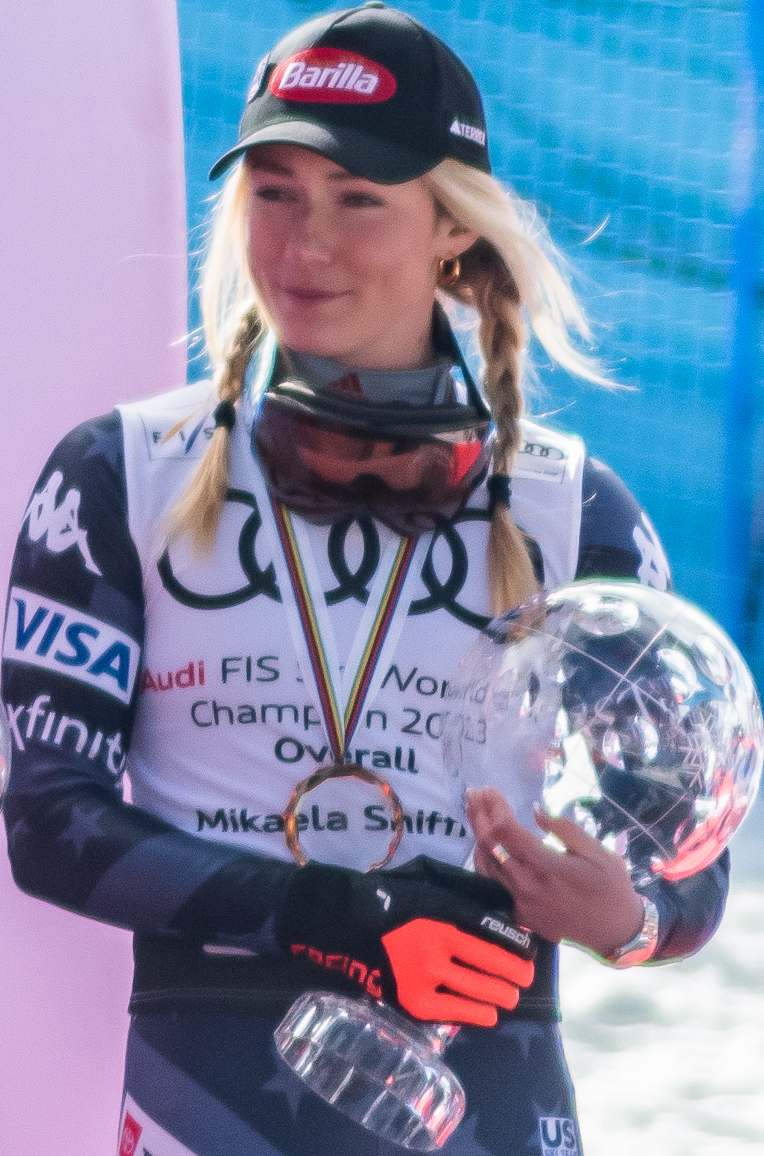
2026 Women's Overall World Cup: Mikaela Shiffrin of the U.S., overall champion for the sixth time; 2026 Women's World Cup; Overall • Downhill • Super-G; Giant slalom • Slalom
Previous: 2025	Next: 2027

The women's overall competition in the 2026 FIS Alpine Skiing World Cup consisted of 37 events in four disciplines: downhill (DH) (9 races), super-G (SG) (8 races), giant slalom (GS) (10 races), and slalom (SL) (10 races). A tentative schedule was circulated on 12 May 2025 following the FIS Alpine Spring Meeting in Vilamoura, Portugal. The initial schedule was released on 12 June 2025 and features events at 20 different resorts, beginning with the traditional opener: a giant slalom on the Rettenbach ski course, located on the Rettenbach glacier in Sölden, Austria, on 25 October 2025. The initial schedule was subject to amendment or revision until the actual start of the season, although the only amendments made to it were caused by adverse weather. Also, for the fourth straight season, neither the combined discipline nor the parallel discipline was contested on the Alpine skiing World Cup circuit, and neither is expected to be contested in the near future, so both may be considered as inactive from now on; in fact, the individual combined was replaced at the 2026 Winter Olympics by the debut of the "team combined", in which two different racers competed for their national team in the speed (downhill/super G) and technical (slalom) portions of the competition.

During the season, Mikaela Shiffrin of the U.S. built up a huge lead for the overall championship, only to have to withstand a late charge from Emma Aicher of Germany, the only competitor to compete in every discipline during the 2026 season (placing in the top 20 in each of them). The battle continued until the second run of the last race of the season at finals, before Shiffrin finally secured her women's-record-tying sixth overall victory.

In 2025, Italian three-event star Federica Brignone won her second overall World Cup title, along with the downhill and giant slalom disciplines. Brignone thus became the oldest overall winner among women at age 34. However, after the end of the World Cup season, Brignone suffered a serious crash during the Italian national championships, fracturing her left leg tibia in multiple places, also breaking the fibular head, and rupturing the ACL. As a result, she was expected to miss most, if not all, of the 2026 season, although she did not need additional surgery to repair her ACL tear.

As is the case every fourth year, the 2026 Winter Olympics (referred to as "Milan Cortina 2026") took place during the season, this time in three regions in Italy – Milan, the Stelvio Pass, and Cortina d'Ampezzo – during 6–22 February 2026. All of the Alpine skiing events for women were held on the classic Olimpia delle Tofane course at Cortina d'Ampezzo. Brignone ended up returning and winning the gold medal in both super-G and giant slalom; Shiffrin won in slalom; Shiffrin's teammate and lifelong friend Breezy Johnson won downhill; and the Austrian team of Ariane Rädler (downhill) and Katharina Huber (slalom) won the team combined.

== Season summary ==
=== The opening months (Oct. 2025 to Christmas) ===
With Brignone on hand for the traditional season-opening race in Sölden, Austria, 27-year-old Austrian skier Julia Scheib, who had finished third in the race last year for her first-ever World Cup individual podium, grabbed her first-ever World Cup victory, which also represented the first victory by an Austrian woman in a World Cup giant slalom race since March 2016. But five-time overall champion Mikaela Shiffrin of the United States (who missed most of last season with a serious puncture wound — but still won four races in her limited appearances, giving her an all-time record of 101 World Cup wins) showed that she was back at full strength in the season opening slalom at Levi, Finland, posting the fastest time in both runs, blowing out the field (with Lara Colturi of Albania second by over a second and a half, and the rest of the field over another second behind), and winning her ninth reindeer for her victory at Levi. Shiffrin's win, coupled with a fourth by Paula Moltzan (who finished second at Sölden), gave the United States the top two places in the overall season standings, with Colturi, a native Italian but naturalized Albanian, moving into third overall on her 19th birthday. The next weekend in Gurgl, Austria for another slalom, Shiffrin again dominated, defeating second-place Colturi by 1.23 seconds.

The World Cup races for both men and women then moved to the Western Hemisphere for the next two weeks, with the first two races, a giant slalom and a slalom, taking place at Copper Mountain (U.S.), which hadn't hosted the World Cup since 2001. Before the first race there, two-time overall champion (and defending super-G champion) Lara Gut-Behrami of Switzerland crashed during giant slalom training and tore her anterior cruciate ligament (ACL), a season-ending knee injury; prior to the injury, Gut-Behrami had planned to retire at the end of the season, but after the injury, she took more of a wait-and-see attitude about retirement. The next day, another training crash on the same slope by rising American speed star Lauren Macuga also tore her ACL, ending her season as well. Finally, in the giant slalom, Scheib almost pulled off a second straight victory, but instead New Zealand's Alice Robinson, the first run leader, held form and became the first woman not from Europe or North America to record five World Cup race victories. Remaining in North America for two giant slalom races at Tremblant (Canada), the first race saw Robinson pulling off a back-to-back victory by almost a second over Zrinka Ljutić of Croatia and becoming the discipline leader. The next day, Scheib bounced back (after crashing the first day) to claim her second giant slalom victory of the season by about half a second, although Shiffrin (who finished fourth) retained the overall lead and Robinson (who finished third) narrowly retained the discipline lead.

After returning to Europe for the official start of the speed season for women, with two downhills and a super-G at St. Moritz, Switzerland, two more training crashes sidelined more members of the Swiss team. First, Corinne Suter, the defending Olympic champion in downhill (and 2020 World Cup discipline champion in both downhill and super-G), tore a muscle in her left calf, bruised her left knee, and fractured a bone in her right foot, and so was forecast to be sidelined until at least mid-January 2026. Then, during the final official pre-race training run, two-time Olympic champion Michelle Gisin crashed and was airlifted to a hospital for spinal surgery; however, this surgery was also not expected to be season-ending. Finally, in the first of the two downhills, 41-year-old Lindsey Vonn of the United States, who was directly behind Gisin in the final training run and thus was stopped and held on the course during the airlift, and who in March had become the oldest female ever to podium in a World Cup race (after a five-year retirement, but with new titanium implants in her right knee), won the race by almost a second for her 83rd career victory (44th in downhill) and thus became the oldest race winner, male or female, in World Cup history (breaking the record previously held by 37-year-old Didier Cuche on 24 February 2012 at a super-G in Crans-Montana). The following day in the second downhill, 22-year-old all-discipline German racer Emma Aicher was able to edge Vonn to prevent back-to-back victories, although Vonn did set a new all-time women's record with her 410th World Cup race (breaking the previous record of 409 by Renate Götschl). Finally, in the super-G, Robinson, the giant slalom discipline leader, edged France's Romane Miradoli, Italy's Sofia Goggia, and Vonn for her first-ever super-G victory, moving her up to just 64 points behind Shiffrin (who competed in her first super-G in almost exactly two years but missed the last gate, costing her a top-10 finish).

Despite the glitch in her super-G restart, Shiffrin's slalom domination remained unchanged, as she won the next race, a night slalom in Courcheval, France, by over 1.5 seconds once more, boosting her lead in the slalom standings to 180 points after just four races in the discipline and her lead in the overall standings back to 164 points. Later that week in a downhill at Val d'Isère, France, 2024 downhill champion Cornelia Hütter of Austria was the best in flat light conditions, edging past Germany's Kira Weidle-Winkelmann, the race's initial starter, and benefitting from mid-race errors by Vonn (who finished third) and Italy's Sofia Goggia, who dropped all the way back to eighth after being forced off the main track. In the next day's super-G, Goggia avoided a similar error and picked up her first victory of the season, with Robinson close behind in second (and closing to just 74 points behind Shiffrin, who skipped the race) and Vonn in third.

=== Midseason (Christmas to Winter Olympics) ===
Two days after Christmas, the women held two technical events in Semmering, Austria. In the giant slalom, Scheib won for the second time this season in front of a home crowd (and third time overall in the discipline), which enabled her to regain the discipline lead over Robinson, who failed to complete her first run; Shiffrin finished sixth and increased her overall lead to 114 points. In the second race, another night slalom, the first run took place on a mild afternoon that destroyed the course, with only 40 of the 77 starters even being able to finish due to all the damage . . . and times almost six seconds behind first-run leader Camille Rast of Switzerland, who had finished second to Scheib in the previous day's giant slalom by .14 seconds (and today held over a half-second lead on Shiffrin in fourth), still qualified for the second run. Although conditions for the second run (three and a half hours later) were better, 6 of the 30 racers nevertheless failed to finish, and 2 others were so far behind (over 8.5 seconds) that they did not earn any points; Rast, however, posted the second-best time for the second run but failed to win, by .09 seconds this time, because Shiffrin closed with a great finishing run that beat Rast by .63 seconds, thus keeping Shiffrin undefeated in slalom for the season and giving her the sixth straight win in slalom (going back to last season), 69th win in World Cup slalom, and 106th World Cup win in all disciplines. Rast's back-to-back runner-ups moved her ahead of Robinson into second place behind Shiffrin for the season, but almost 200 points behind. In the giant slalom the following week at Kranjska Gora, Slovenia, Robinson again failed to complete the first run, and Scheib and Rast again battled for the win, except this time Rast came out on top by 0.2 seconds for her first giant slalom victory, thus closing her deficit to Shiffrin (who was fifth) in the overall race to 140 points; Rast, who like all members of the Swiss team wore a black armband during the race, then dedicated her victory to the victims of a New Year's Eve fire in Crans-Montana, in her home canton. The next day, Rast (still wearing the black armband) and Shiffrin dominated in the slalom, but this time Rast narrowly bettered Shiffrin in each run to win by 0.14 seconds, break Shiffrin's season-long slalom winning streak, and win back-to-back races the same weekend, while the next-best skier (Rast's teammate Wendy Holdener) finished over a second and a half (actually 1.83 seconds) behind.

The downhill season then resumed with a shortened course due to heavy snow in Zauchensee, Austria, and Vonn remained on top of the podium by a little over 1/3 of a second over Norway's Kajsa Vickhoff Lie, allowing her to open up a 129-point lead over Aicher in the discipline. The next day's super-G had to be cancelled due to snow and strong, gusty winds that made the course unsafe; the race was then rescheduled as a second super-G to be held in Soldeu, Andorra, on 28 February, with the downhill scheduled for that day being moved back to the 27th. Two days later, at a night slalom in Flachau, Austria, the top two after both runs were American, with Shiffrin winning and Paula Moltzan second – maintaining a statistic that no American woman other than Shiffrin has won a World Cup slalom since Lindsey Vonn in 2009, and leaving Shiffrin with a 170-point lead overall over Rast (who finished fourth). That weekend, on the long downhill course at Tarvisio, Italy, last raced in the World Cup in 2011, Italy's Nicol Delago posted a home-team victory for her first World Cup win, edging out both Weidle-Winkelmann and Vonn, who posted her fifth-straight podium for the season and moved into third place in the overall rankings – thus placing three Americans (Shiffrin, Vonn, and Moltzan) in the overall top four. The next day, the third super-G of the season finally took place, with Germany's Aicher holding off Vonn for the victory and Czechia's Ester Ledecká returning to the podium for the first time in over a year (11 Jan. 2025), while the rest of the field finished over a second behind Aicher, which moved her into third place overall, 8 points ahead of Vonn. Also during that weekend, Slovakia's Petra Vlhová, who won the overall title in 2021, announced that, after two years of recovery, she had finally been cleared to return to competitive skiing, and she hoped to compete enough to be ready to defend her 2022 slalom title in the Olympics a month later.

Two days later, at the giant slalom at Kronplatz, Italy, came another return: defending overall champion Brignone, who said that she had only been training on skis for 13 days after her surgery and recovery but wanted the race to see where she stood physically less than one month before the Olympic Games: "Then we arrived to this conclusion when we said, “OK, it's maybe good for me to try’". But she did more than "try" at Kronplatz, as her sixth-place finish, the top by an Italian on the home snow, ensured her selection for the Italian Olympic team. In the race, Scheib closed from third after the first run to overtake both Rast and Sweden's Sara Hector, the first-run leader, for her fourth victory of the season. Just a few days later in another giant slalom at Špindlerův Mlýn, Czechia, however, Scheib skied out and failed to finish her second run, and Hector maintained her opening-run lead to earn her first win of the season, narrowly edging the two fastest racers on the second run: Americans Moltzan and Shiffrin (who earned her first podium in giant slalom in two years; the last was the week before the first of her two serious injuries over those seasons). Unlike Brignone, Vhlová chose not to return the next day for the last slalom before the Olympics, and Shiffrin repeated her early-season dominance, posting the fastest time on both runs, beating runner-up Rast by 1.67 seconds and the rest of the field by over two seconds, and (with a 288-point lead with only two races remaining) clinching the season crystal globe in the discipline (her record ninth in slalom, for the moment one better than Vonn's eight in downhill). The next weekend in a downhill at Crans Montana, Switzerland, just nine days before the Olympic downhill, a day with snowfall and poor visibility led to three of the first six racers crashing out, including two – Marte Monsen of Norway and Vonn – who ended up in the netting surrounding the course and needed significant assistance, before the race was canceled. Vonn was airlifted off the course and found to have completely torn her ACL, an injury requiring surgery that would normally be season-ending – but Vonn decided to compete in the Olympics the next weekend anyway by wearing a knee brace on her non-titanium knee. In the next day's super-G (without Vonn), the home country's Malorie Blanc, 22, won her first World Cup race by edging Goggia, with the U.S.'s Breezy Johnson recording her first super-G podium as well.

==== Milan Cortina 2026 ====
At the Olympic downhill, Vonn's gamble looked sound when she finished third in the final training run, but it quickly backfired the next day when her right shoulder and arm hit a gate while airborne during the race, resulting in a horrendous crash that broke her left leg and required her to be airlifted to a hospital for immediate surgery, thus ending her season. However, her teammate Breezy Johnson, who won the world championship in downhill last year but had missed the 2022 Winter Olympics due to her own crash at Cortina d'Ampezzo during training there, became the second American woman (after Vonn in 2010) to win the Olympic gold in this event, edging Aicher by just 0.04 seconds, with the home country's Goggia completing her complete set of Olympic medals with the bronze (joining her gold from 2018 and her silver from 2022). Johnson looked to be on the verge of a second gold in the new "team combined" event, after she posted the fastest downhill run, turning over the lead for the slalom run to her partner Shiffrin (the same as a year ago, when the pair won the event in its debut in the 2025 world championships) -- but Shiffrin (perhaps still spooked by her medal-less Beijing Olympics in 2022 despite being favored in three events (none of which she completed) and competing in six), only recorded the 15th-best time (out of 18) in the slalom, finishing a full second behind Aicher (who skied the slalom leg for Germany), thus missing the podium again. Austria's Ariane Rädler (who posted the second-best downhill) and Katharina Huber, neither of whom have ever won on the World Cup circuit, took the gold by edging Aicher and her teammate Kira Weidle-Winkelmann by 0.05 seconds, relegating Aicher to two silvers by a combined margin of 0.09 seconds, with the second U.S. team of Jackie Wiles and Moltzan (each of whom placed fourth in her event) taking the bronze. The super-G held a huge surprise, as Brignone, in only her third start in all disciplines for the season, roared to victory in difficult weather conditions (overcast, occasional snow, limited light; 17 starters failed to finish), thus earning a gold medal to complete her own career set of Olympic medals in three different disciplines (bronze in GS in 2018, silver in GS and bronze in combined in 2022); France's Romane Miradoli grabbed a surprise silver, and Austria's Conny Hütter edged her teammate Rädler by 0.01 seconds for the bronze. Two days later, Vonn revealed that, after her fourth post-race surgery in northern Italy on her shattered tibia, she was finally cleared to return to the U.S. -- but she would need additional surgery after her return.

As the focus shifted to the technical events on the relatively flat course at Cortina, Brignore continued her dream comeback from her own injury, dominating the field in the giant slalom by over 0.6 seconds while the skiers finishing second through ninth were separated by less than 0.2 seconds, allowing her to improve from a silver medal in the discipline at the 2022 Winter Olympics to a gold now, with defending gold medalist Hector and Norway's Thea Louise Stjernesund finishing in a dead heat to share the silver (the first women's medal for each country in these Olympics). At the slalom, the last of the 10 Alpine skiing events at these Games, all eyes were focused on the weather, which had turned the technical course from powder (as in the previous runs on it) to ice, and on the unusual course setup by the Austrian coach for the first run -- but the setup did not hamper Shiffrin, as she posted a lead of 0.82 seconds over Dürr, the only racer within one second, and then posted the second-fastest time on the second run (behind only her teammate Moltzan (who placed eighth)) to win by 1.5 seconds, reclaiming the slalom gold medal that she previously won in 2014 -- and finally ending her streak of not medaling. Two first-time medalists completed the podium: Rast claimed the silver medal for the first Alpine skiing medal won by the Swiss women (after eight by the men), and Anna Swenn-Larsson of Sweden claimed the bronze; defending gold medalist Vlhová returned to competition but placed 20th.

=== The late season (post-Olympics to finals) ===
In the first post-Olympic race for the World Cup women – a downhill on the Àliga course in Soldeu, Andorra – Switzerland's Corinne Suter, the 2020 discipline champion who had suffered a series of injuries in recent years and had only returned from a season-opening injury in January, edged Austria's Nina Ortlieb for her first World Cup victory in any discipline in over three years (since December 2022) and her first downhill win since the Beijing Winter Olympics in February 2022. Brignone was unable to maintain her Olympic form in the first of the two super-Gs there, as she only finished 15th, but Aicher dominated the field again, winning by 0.88 seconds over Robinson, with Goggia, in pursuit of her first super-G discipline championship, only managing sixth to lead Robinson by just 20 and Aicher by 96; Aicher also closed to within 300 points of overall leader Shiffrin with four more speed races before the next technical race. But the next day, Goggia earned her second super-G victory of the season, beating Aicher by 0.24 seconds to expand her lead over Robinson (who finished seventh) to 84 points and over Aicher to 116 points.

Prior to the next events in Val di Fassa (Italy), Brignone announced that she was ending her season early to permit her to fully recover from her injuries, now that she had achieved her goal of competing in the Olympics (along with winning two gold medals, in super-G and giant slalom). In the first of the two downhills there, Italy's Laura Pirovano, in her ninth World Cup season and skiing on home snow, recorded both her first podium and her first win, edging Aicher by one-one-hundredth of a second (.01), with Johnson in third; however, Aicher's total of 310 points in her last four races pushed her ahead of Rast into overall second place, just 139 points behind Shiffrin for the overall lead (1133 to 994), with two more speed races to come at Val di Fassa. Shockingly, the next day Pirovano did it again, this time beating Conny Hütter by .01 seconds and Corinne Suter by .05 seconds, which enabled Pirovano to jump over both Vonn and Aicher (who finished 12th, worth 22 points) and grab the downhill discipline lead by 28 points, while Shiffrin remained 117 points ahead of Aicher in the overall race. Aicher's recent success inspired Shiffrin to enter only her second super-G of the year the next day, but when Aicher crashed out on a bump, the story instead turned out to be two other Italian races: 35-year-old Elena Curtoni, who won the super-G and became the second-oldest women's World Cup winner ever, behind only Vonn, and Asja Zenere, a 29-year-old who just debuted on the World Cup circuit four years ago and achieved her first podium with a third-place finish, while Shiffrin's 23rd-place finish increased her lead over Aicher to 125 points.

In the last weekend before finals at Åre (Sweden), Scheib's victory in the giant slalom-- her fifth of the World Cup season (and of her nine-year career), by .36 seconds over Moltzan -- clinched the discipline title for the season for her; meanwhile, in the Shiffrin-Aicher battle for the overall lead, Shiffrin overcame a major first-run error (which left her in 12th place) to rally to fifth after two runs, just one place and five points behind Aicher (fourth), reducing Shiffrin's overall lead slightly to 120 points. Finally, in the slalom, Vhlova did not return after the Olympics, and Shiffrin tied the all-time record, previously held by Janica Kostelic (2001) and herself (2019), with her eighth slalom victory of the season, by almost a full second over Aicher (the best slalom result of Aicher's young career); Aicher thus remained in second place in the overall standings, 140 points behind Shiffrin, with just the finals remaining.

== Finals ==
The finals in all disciplines will be held from 21 to 25 March 2026 in Lillehammer, Norway; the speed events will be held on the Olympiabakken course at Kvitfjell, and the technical events will be held on the Olympialøypa course at Hafjell. Only the top 25 skiers in each World Cup discipline and the winner of the 2026 FIS Junior World Championships in the discipline, plus any skiers who have scored at least 500 points in the World Cup overall classification for the season, will be eligible to compete in the final, and only the top 15 finishers will earn World Cup points. Heading into finals, 15 women had scored at least 500 points overall during the season and so would have the option to compete in any discipline in finals. In the first discipline, downhill, the race came down to Pirovano and Johnson (who was not in contention for the season title), with Pirovano prevailing by .15 seconds for her third straight downhill victory and the discipline title for the first time. Aicher (who finished fifth) picked up 45 points to close her deficit to Shiffrin (who no longer competes in downhill since her 2024 injury) to 95 points with three races remaining, all of which feature them both. The Italian domination continued in the super-G, as Goggia bested runner-up Corinne Suter by .32 seconds, thus earning the season discipline title -- her first in super-G to go along with four in downhill. In the battle for the overall crown, Aicher finished fourth, thus earning 50 points, while Shiffrin finished 22nd, earning no points, which narrowed Shiffrin's advantage over Aicher to just 45 points with two technical races remaining. In the first (slalom), Shiffrin took over a second lead over the field on the first run and maintained it on the second; her victory (her 110th overall on the World Cup circuit) made her the first woman to achieve nine victories in one discipline in a season. Aicher's third place left her 85 points behind Shiffrin, thus allowing Aicher to retain a theoretical chance of winning the overall title were she to win the last race of finals (tomorrow's giant slalom) and Shiffrin place worse than 15th. After the first run of giant slalom, this upset looked possible, as Aicher was narrowly behind in third and Shiffrin was only 17th; however, Shiffrin's much better second run put her easily into the top 15 long before Aicher's second run, in which Aicher fell back all the way to twelfth place, just behind Shiffrin. In the remainder of the race, Canada's Valérie Grenier held the lead after both runs and thus won her third World Cup title ever.

With the victory, Shiffrin won her sixth overall title, tying her for first among women with Austria's Annemarie Moser-Pröll, who won her six titles over nine seasons (first title in 1971 and sixth in 1979); Shiffrin has won her six titles over 10 seasons (first title in 2017 and sixth in 2026).

== Standings ==
#	Skier	DH; 9 races	SG; 8 races	GS; 9 races	SL; 10 races	Total
1	(United States) Mikaela Shiffrin	0	8	422	980	1410
2	(Germany) Emma Aicher	453	354	135	381	1323
3	(Switzerland) Camille Rast	0	0	511	538	1049
4	(Italy) Sofia Goggia	307	549	126	0	982
5	(New Zealand) Alice Robinson	21	386	408	0	815
6	(United States) Paula Moltzan	0	0	392	392	784
7	(Italy) Laura Pirovano	536	201	8	0	745
8	(Austria) Julia Scheib	0	12	720	0	732
9	(Sweden) Sara Hector	0	0	479	213	692
10	(Germany) Kira Weidle-Winkelmann	411	229	0	0	640
11	(Austria) Cornelia Hütter	376	244	0	0	620
12	(United States) Lindsey Vonn	400	190	0	0	590
13	(Switzerland) Wendy Holdener	0	0	82	498	580
14	(Norway) Kajsa Vickhoff Lie	258	289	30	0	577
15	(Albania) Lara Colturi	0	0	191	344	535
16	(United States) Breezy Johnson	413	92	0	0	505
17	(Czech Republic) Ester Ledecká	209	284	0	0	493
18	(Switzerland) Corinne Suter	257	225	0	0	482
19	(Austria) Katharina Truppe	0	0	0	441	441
20	(France) Romane Miradoli	173	260	0	0	433
21	(Germany) Lena Dürr	0	0	152	246	403
22	(Canada) Valérie Grenier	8	64	312	0	384
23	(Austria) Ariane Rädler	231	145	0	0	376
24	(Italy) Elena Curtoni	94	266	0	0	360
24	(Austria) Nina Ortlieb	258	102	0	0	360
26	(Switzerland) Malorie Blanc	85	262	0	0	347
27	(Croatia) Zrinka Ljutić	0	0	267	79	346
28	(Italy) Lara Della Mea	0	0	196	139	335
29	(Austria) Mirjam Puchner	193	114	0	0	307
30	(Sweden) Anna Swenn-Larsson	0	0	0	304	304
31	(Norway) Thea Louise Stjernesund	0	0	272	25	297
32	(Slovenia) Ilka Štuhec	207	86	0	0	293
33	(Italy) Nicol Delago	272	15	0	0	287
34	(United States) Nina O'Brien	0	0	215	37	252
35	(United States) Jacqueline Wiles	210	26	0	0	236
36	(United States) Keely Cashman	42	177	0	0	219
37	(Norway) Mina Fürst Holtmann	0	0	184	20	204
38	(Poland) Maryna Gąsienica-Daniel	0	2	189	0	191
39	(Italy) Asja Zenere	1	83	105	0	189
39	(Austria) Katharina Liensberger	0	0	73	116	189
41	(France) Marion Chevrier	0	0	0	187	187
42	(France) Laura Gauché	22	164	0	0	186
43	(Sweden) Cornelia Öhlund	0	0	0	185	185
44	(Italy) Roberta Melesi	37	137	0	0	174
45	(Latvia) Dženifera Ģērmane	0	0	0	172	172
46	(Austria) Stephanie Brunner	0	12	155	0	167
47	(Canada) Britt Richardson	0	0	163	0	163
48	(France) Camille Cerutti	27	129	2	0	158
49	(Austria) Magdalena Egger	123	29	0	0	152
50	(Sweden) Hanna Aronsson Elfman	0	0	26	118	144
51	(United States) AJ Hurt	0	0	97	38	135
52	(Austria) Katharina Huber	0	0	0	134	134
53	(Norway) Marte Monsen	120	12	0	0	132
54	(Sweden) Estelle Alphand	0	0	95	32	127
55	(Switzerland) Mélanie Meillard	0	0	0	126	126
56	(Switzerland) Eliane Christen	0	0	0	115	115
57	(France) Caitlin McFarlane	0	0	0	114	114
57	(Austria) Katharina Gallhuber	0	0	0	114	114
59	(Switzerland) Vanessa Kasper	0	0	111	0	111
60	(Italy) Nadia Delago	106	2	0	0	108
61	(United States) Allison Mollin	92	12	0	0	104
62	(Italy) Federica Brignone	0	61	40	0	101
63	(Canada) Laurence St-Germain	0	0	0	91	91
64	(Switzerland) Janine Schmitt	72	17	0	0	89
64	(Austria) Nadine Fest	32	57	0	0	89
66	(Slovenia) Ana Bucik Jogan	0	0	23	63	86
67	(Austria) Nina Astner	0	0	85	0	85
68	(United States) Mary Bocock	7	74	0	0	81
69	(Switzerland) Jasmine Flury	71	9	0	0	80
70	(France) Clara Direz	0	0	74	0	74
70	(Switzerland) Stefanie Grob	21	39	14	0	74
72	(Switzerland) Sue Piller	0	0	73	0	73
72	(France) Marie Lamure	0	0	0	73	73
72	(Austria) Ricarda Haaser	21	17	35	0	73
75	(Italy) Martina Peterlini	0	0	0	72	72
75	(Austria) Lisa Hörhager	0	0	12	60	72
77	(Italy) Anna Trocker	0	0	32	29	61
77	(Switzerland) Jasmina Suter	15	46	0	0	61
77	(Austria) Franziska Gritsch	0	0	47	14	61
80	(Switzerland) Lara Gut-Behrami	0	0	60	0	60
80	(Norway) Madeleine Sylvester-Davik	0	0	60	0	60
82	(Austria) Natalie Falch	0	0	0	56	56
83	(United States) Elisabeth Bocock	0	0	52	1	53
83	(United States) Isabella Wright	48	5	0	0	53
85	(Switzerland) Joana Hählen	8	42	0	0	50
86	(Japan) Asa Ando	0	0	0	49	49
87	(Sweden) Hilma Lövblom	0	0	45	0	45
88	(United States) Tricia Mangan	2	41	0	0	43
89	(Slovenia) Neja Dvornik	0	0	5	36	41
89	(United States) Haley Cutler	26	15	0	0	41
91	(Italy) Ilaria Ghisalberti	0	0	38	0	38
92	(Canada) Cassidy Gray	0	0	37	0	37
93	(Switzerland) Delia Durrer	29	7	0	0	36
94	(Czech Republic) Martina Dubovská	0	0	0	34	34
95	(Italy) Emilia Mondinelli	0	0	0	33	33
96	(Switzerland) Anuk Brändli	0	0	0	32	32
97	(Norway) Bianca Bakke Westhoff	0	0	0	31	31
98	(France) Doriane Escané	0	0	21	8	29
99	(Germany) Fabiana Dorigo	0	0	28	0	28
100	(Canada) Amelia Smart	0	0	0	25	25
101	(Switzerland) Aline Höpli	0	0	0	24	24
102	(United States) Katie Hensien	0	0	22	0	22
102	(Switzerland) Priska Ming-Nufer	19	3	0	0	22
104	(Switzerland) Aline Danioth	0	0	0	21	21
104	(Finland) Erika Pykalainen	0	0	21	0	21
104	(Italy) Sara Allemand	0	21	0	0	21
107	(United States) Liv Moritz	0	0	0	20	20
107	(Switzerland) Dania Allenbach	0	0	20	0	20
109	(Sweden) Sophie Nyberg	0	0	18	0	18
109	(Italy) Giulia Valleriani	0	0	0	18	18
109	(Italy) Sara Thaler	14	4	0	0	18
112	(Austria) Lena Wechner	16	0	0	0	16
112	(Bosnia and Herzegovina) Elvedina Muzaferija	0	16	0	0	16
114	(Andorra) Carla Mijares Ruf	0	0	0	13	13
115	(Italy) Alice Pazzaglia	0	0	12	0	12
116	(Austria) Christina Ager	10	1	0	0	11
117	(Switzerland) Nicole Good	0	0	0	10	10
117	(Canada) Ali Nullmeyer	0	0	0	10	10
117	(Canada) Justine Lamontagne	0	0	5	5	10
120	(Austria) Victoria Olivier	0	0	9	0	9
120	(Germany) Jessica Hilzinger	0	0	0	9	9
120	(Japan) Chisaki Maeda	0	0	0	9	9
120	(Croatia) Leona Popović	0	0	0	9	9
124	(Switzerland) Jasmin Mathis	8	0	0	0	8
124	(Italy) Giorgia Collomb	0	0	8	0	8
124	(Slovenia) Nika Tomšič	0	0	0	8	8
124	(Andorra) Cande Moreno	5	3	0	0	8
128	(France) Garance Meyer	0	7	0	0	7
128	(Germany) Jana Fritz	0	0	7	0	7
128	(Switzerland) Simone Wild	0	0	7	0	7
131	(Austria) Emily Schöpf	6	0	0	0	6
131	(Austria) Viktoria Bürgler	0	0	6	0	6
131	(Sweden) Moa Landström	0	0	0	6	6
131	(Hungary) Zita Tóth	0	0	0	6	6
135	(Italy) Beatrice Sola	0	0	0	5	5
136	(Norway) Inni Holm Wembstad	4	0	0	0	4
137	(Finland) Rosa Pohjolainen	0	0	0	3	3
137	(Austria) Carmen Spielberger	3	0	0	0	3
137	(Israel) Noa Szőllős	0	0	0	3	3
140	(Austria) Leonie Raich	0	0	0	2	2
141	(Austria) Lisa Grill	0	1	0	0	1
141	(Austria) Leonie Zegg	1	0	0	0	1

- Leader
- 2nd place
- 3rd place
- does not compete in this discipline
- Updated on 25 March 2026, after all races.

== See also ==
- 2026 Alpine Skiing World Cup – Women's summary rankings
- 2026 Alpine Skiing World Cup – Women's downhill
- 2026 Alpine Skiing World Cup – Women's super-G
- 2026 Alpine Skiing World Cup – Women's giant slalom
- 2026 Alpine Skiing World Cup – Women's slalom
- 2026 Alpine Skiing World Cup – Men's overall
- World Cup scoring system
