= 2026 Alpine Skiing World Cup – Women's super-G =

Alpine ski discipline year standings

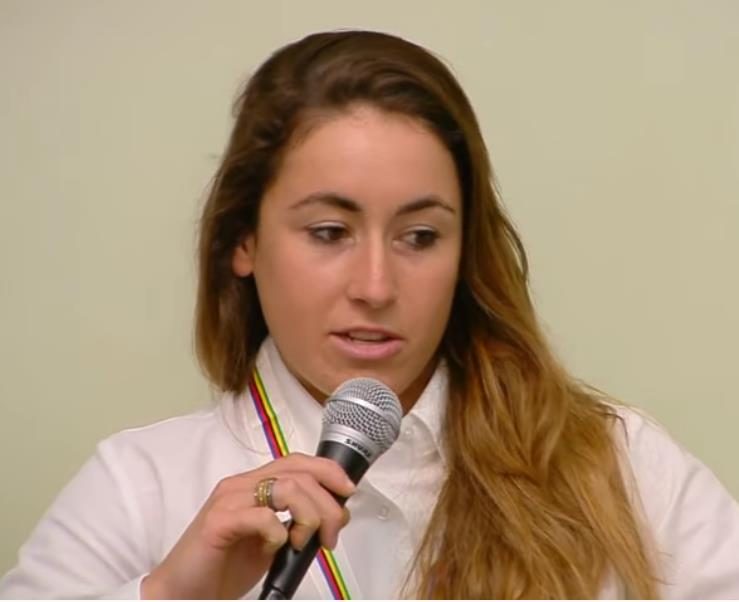
2026 Women's Super-G World Cup: Sofia Goggia of Italy, season champion; 2026 Women's World Cup; Overall • Downhill • Super-G; Giant slalom • Slalom
Previous: 2025	Next: 2027

The women's super-G in the 2026 FIS Alpine Skiing World Cup consisted of eight events, including the final. The season began at St. Moritz, Switzerland on 14 December 2025 and then remained in Europe all season, with each race planned to occur the day after a downhill, according to the initial schedule released on 12 June 2025, although cancellations and reschedulings changed that plan. The Di Prampero course in Tarvisio, Italy hosted a World Cup race on 18 January 2026 for the first time since 2011. The season champion was Sofia Goggia of Italy, her first season championship in the discipline.

The season was interrupted for the quadrennial 2026 Winter Olympics in three regions in Italy – Milan, the Stelvio Pass, and Cortina d'Ampezzo – during 6–22 February 2026. The Alpine speed skiing events for women took place on the classic Olimpia delle Tofane course at Cortina d'Ampezzo. The championship in women's super-G was held on Thursday, 12 February, and was won by last season's runner-up in the discipline, Federica Brignone of Italy, who missed virtually all of the season due to an injury suffered at the very end of last season.

== Season summary ==
The super-G discipline was the final discipline to begin for the women in the 2026 season, not starting until the tenth race of the season (and third speed race at St. Moritz, Switzerland). By that point, five of the discipline's biggest stars were out, including defending champion Lara Gut-Behrami, Corinne Suter, and Michelle Gisin (all of Switzerland), Federica Brignone (Italy), and Lauren Macuga (U.S.). In the first race, New Zealand's Alice Robinson, the current giant slalom discipline leader, edged France's Romane Miradoli, Italy's Sofia Goggia, and the United States' Lindsey Vonn for her first-ever super-G victory; overall leader and 2019 discipline champion Mikaela Shiffrin competed in her first super-G in almost exactly two years but missed the last gate, costing her a top-10 finish. The next week at Val d'Isère, France, Goggia, who had made a serious mistake in the previous day's downhill while leading, picked up her first victory of the season, with Robinson close behind in second (and retaining the discipline lead) and Vonn in third.

When the discipline resumed in January, the first race in Zauchensee, Austria had to be cancelled due to strong, gusty winds that made the course unsafe. The race was then rescheduled as a second super-G to be held in Soldeu, Andorra, on 28 February, with the downhill scheduled for that day being moved back to the 27th. Finally, the third super-G of the season took place in Tarvisio, Italy on 18 January, with Germany's Emma Aicher holding off Vonn for the victory, with Czechia's Ester Ledecká returning to the podium for the first time in over a year (11 Jan. 2025) and the rest of the field finishing over a second behind; Goggia, who finished sixth, moved into the discipline lead by 10 points over Vonn and 20 over Robinson, who failed to place in the top 30. In the final World Cup race before the start of the Olympics later that week, at Crans Montana, Switzerland, the home country's Malorie Blanc, 22, won her first World Cup race by edging Goggia, with the U.S.'s Breezy Johnson recording her first super-G podium as well in a race held without Vonn, who had suffered a complete ACL tear the day before, but with Brignone, appearing in her second race since her injury ten months ago.

The Winter Olympics held a huge surprise, as Brignone, who had made a huge effort to return for a home-region Olympics, roared to victory in difficult weather conditions (overcast, occasional snow, limited light; 17 starters failed to finish), thus earning a gold medal to complete her career set of medals in three different disciplines (bronze in GS in 2018, silver in GS and bronze in combined in 2022); France's Romane Miradoli grabbed a surprise silver, and Austria's Conny Hütter edged her teammate Ariane Rädler by 0.01 seconds for the bronze. Brignone was unable to maintain her form in the first of the two super-Gs in Soldeu (Andorra), as she only finished 15th, but (after Vonn's season-ending injury at the Olympics) the discipline race was thrown wide open when Aicher dominated the field again, winning by 0.88 seconds over Robinson, with discipline leader Goggia only managing sixth to lead Robinson by 20 and Aicher by 96 with three races remaining. But the next day, Goggia, in pursuit of her first ever super-G discipline championship, earned her second super-G victory of the season, beating Aicher by 0.24 seconds to expand her lead over Robinson (who finished seventh) to 84 points and over Aicher to 116 points, with everyone else eliminated. Prior to the next events in Val di Fassa (Italy), Brignone announced that she was ending her season early to permit her to fully recover from her injuries, now that she had achieved her goal of competing in the Olympics (along with winning two gold medals, in super-G and giant slalom). Following two downhills both won by an Italian skier (Laura Pirovano) on home snow, Goggia was bidding to add to the Italian headlines by clinching the super-G championship in the next-to-last race, but the story instead turned out to be two other Italian races: 35-year-old Elena Curtoni, who became the second-oldest women's World Cup winner ever, behind only Vonn, with a victory there, and Asja Zenere, a 29-year-old who just debuted on the World Cup circuit four years ago and achieved her first podium with a third-place finish, while Goggia carried a 63-point lead over Robinson into a two-way battle at the finals.

== Finals ==
The World Cup finals in the discipline are scheduled to take place on Sunday, 22 March 2026 on the Olympiabakken course at Kvitfjell, near Lillehammer, Norway. Only the top 25 skiers in the World Cup super-G discipline and the winner of the 2026 FIS Junior World Championships in the discipline (Emy Charbonnier of France), plus any skiers who have scored at least 500 points in the World Cup overall classification for the season, will be eligible to compete in the final, and only the top 15 will earn World Cup points. As expected, all of the eligible racers except for Vonn competed, as well as giant slalom season champion Julia Scheib of Austria and slalom season champion Shiffrin (both with over 500 points) and Charbonnier (junior champion), setting the starting field at 27. But the race itself was no contest, as Goggia bested runner-up Corinne Suter (returning to form after missing half the season due to injury) by .32 seconds, and Robinson barely avoided missing a gate during the run, thus ensuring the season title for Goggia -- her first in super-G to go along with four in downhill.

== Standings ==
	Venue	14 Dec 2025; St. Moritz	21 Dec 2025; Val d'Isère	11 Jan 2026; Zauchensee	18 Jan 2026; Tarvisio	31 Jan 2026; Crans Montana	12 Feb 2026; Cortina d'Ampezzo	28 Feb 2026; Soldeu R#	1 Mar 2026; Soldeu	8 Mar 2026; Val di Fassa	22 Mar 2026; Kvitfjell	
#	Skier	(Switzerland)	(France)	(Austria)	(Italy)	(Switzerland)	(Italy)	(Andorra)	(Andorra)	(Italy)	(Norway)	Total
	(Italy) Sofia Goggia	60	100	x	40	80	DNF	40	100	29	100	549
2	(New Zealand) Alice Robinson	100	80	x	0	40	⑧	80	36	50	0	386
3	(Germany) Emma Aicher	DNF	24	x	100	DNF	DNF	100	80	DNF	50	354
4	(Norway) Kajsa Vickhoff Lie	26	18	x	36	24	⑤	45	60	80	DNF	289
5	(Czech Republic) Ester Ledecká	15	29	x	60	26	DNF	50	40	24	40	284
6	(Italy) Elena Curtoni	40	50	x	15	DNF	⑦	13	16	100	32	266
7	(Switzerland) Malorie Blanc	40	11	x	2	100	⑩	24	16	40	29	262
8	(France) Romane Miradoli	80	29	x	50	22	②	DNF	29	50	DNF	260
9	(Austria) Cornelia Hütter	29	40	x	22	32	③	26	14	36	45	244
10	(Germany) Kira Weidle-Winkelmann	24	10	x	32	45	DNF	36	18	4	60	227
11	(Switzerland) Corinne Suter	DNS		x	7	8	⑪	60	50	20	80	225
12	(Italy) Laura Pirovano	32	14	x	26	DNF	⑤	32	45	32	20	201
13	(United States) Lindsey Vonn	50	60	x	80	DNS	DNS					190
14	(United States) Keely Cashman	18	24	x	45	6	⑮	22	22	14	26	177
15	(France) Laura Gauché	45	15	x	16	18	⑫	29	11	6	24	164
16	(Austria) Ariane Rädler	6	32	x	13	36	④	DNF	13	9	36	145
17	(Italy) Roberta Melesi	11	20	x	24	50	DNS	10	DNF	22	0	137
18	(France) Camille Cerutti	14	45	x	9	5	⑧	20	20	16	0	129
19	(Austria) Mirjam Puchner	DNF	3	x	29	29	DNF	18	0	13	22	114
20	(Austria) Nina Ortlieb	20	16	x	14	11	DNF	DNF	29	12	0	102
21	(United States) Breezy Johnson	DNS		x	6	60	DNF	6	1	1	18	92
22	(Slovenia) Ilka Štuhec	DNF	36	x	DNF	20	DNF	15	0	15	0	86
23	(Italy) Asja Zenere	DNF	DNS	x	DNS	0	DNS	DNF	7	60	16	83
24	(United States) Mary Bocock	13	0	x	0	16	DNF	14	24	7	0	74
25	(Canada) Valérie Grenier	2	12	x	18	DNS	DNF	11	11	10	0	64
26	(Italy) Federica Brignone	DNS				13	①	16	32	DNS	NE	61
27	(Austria) Nadine Fest	5	2	x	8	0	DNS	12	12	18	NE	57
28	(Switzerland) Jasmina Suter	22	9	x	0	15	DNS	DNF	0	0	NE	46
29	(Switzerland) Joana Hählen	9	8	x	20	2	DNS	DNF	0	3	NE	42
30	(United States) Tricia Mangan	10	7	x	0	12	DNS	9	3	0	NE	41
31	(Switzerland) Stefanie Grob	0	DNS	x	0	DNS	DNS	5	8	26	NE	39
32	(Austria) Magdalena Egger	16	13	x	DNS						NE	29
33	(United States) Jacqueline Wiles	DNS	0	x	12	14	⑬	DNF	0	0	NE	26
34	(Italy) Sara Allemand	DNF	5	x	3	DNS		8	0	5	NE	21
35	(Switzerland) Janine Schmitt	4	0	x	0	2	DNF	DNS	0	11	NE	17
36	(Austria) Ricarda Haaser	DNS		x	10	7	DNS	DNF	DNS		NE	17
37	(Bosnia and Herzegovina) Elvedina Muzaferija	7	0	x	0	9	⑯	DNS	DNS	0	NE	16
38	(United States) Haley Cutler	8	0	x	4	0	DNS	3	0	DNF	NE	15
39	(Italy) Nicol Delago	0	0	x	DNF	4	DNS	7	4	0	NE	15
40	(Austria) Stephanie Brunner	12	0	x	0	0	DNS	DNS			NE	12
41	(United States) Allison Mollin	0	0	x	11	DNF	DNS	DNF	1	0	NE	12
42	(Austria) Julia Scheib	DNS		x	DNS	10	DNS	DNF	2	DNS	DNS	12
43	(Norway) Marte Monsen	0	0	x	1	DNS		DNF	9	2	NE	12
44	(Switzerland) Jasmine Flury	0	4	x	5	DNF	DNS	DNS		0	NE	9
45	(United States) Mikaela Shiffrin	DNF	DNS							8	0	8
46	(France) Garance Meyer	DNS	0	x	0	DNS	DNS	0	7	0	NE	7
47	(Switzerland) Delia Durrer	0	7	x	DNF	0	⑰	DNF	0	0	NE	7
48	(United States) Isabella Wright	0	DNS	DNS	0	DNF	DNS	DNF	5	0	NE	5
49	(Italy) Sara Thaler	0	0	x	0	DNS	DNS	4	0	0	NE	4
50	(Andorra) Cande Moreno	3	0	x	DNF	DNF	DNS	DNS			NE	3
51	(Switzerland) Priska Ming-Nufer	0	0	x	0	3	DNS	DNS	DNS		NE	3
52	(Italy) Nadia Delago	0	0	x	0	0	DNS	2	0	DNF	NE	2
53	(Poland) Maryna Gąsienica-Daniel	2	DNS	x	0	DNS	⑱	0	DNF	DNS	NE	2
54	(Austria) Christina Ager	DNS	1	x	0	0	DNS	DNS			NE	1
55	(Austria) Lisa Grill	DNS						1	0	DNS	NE	1
	References											

=== Legend ===
- Winner (100 points)
- 2nd place (80 points)
- 3rd place (60 points)
- DNF = Did not finish
- DSQ = Disqualified
- Did not start (DNS)
- Not eligible for finals (NE)
- Race canceled (x)
- FIS non-World Cup race (World Championships)
- R# = Rescheduled (make-up) race
- Updated at 22 March 2026, after all races.

== See also ==
- 2026 Alpine Skiing World Cup – Women's summary rankings
- 2026 Alpine Skiing World Cup – Women's overall
- 2026 Alpine Skiing World Cup – Women's downhill
- 2026 Alpine Skiing World Cup – Women's giant slalom
- 2026 Alpine Skiing World Cup – Women's slalom
- World Cup scoring system
