= Mary Bocock =

American alpine skier

Personal information
- Born: 7 October 2003 (age 22) Salt Lake City, Utah, US
- Family: Elisabeth Bocock (sister)

Skiing career
- Country: United States
- Sport: Alpine skiing
- College team: Dartmouth Big Green
- Club: Rowmark Ski Academy
- Disciplines: Downhill, super-G, and giant slalom
- World Cup debut: 28 October 2023 (age 20)

Olympics
- Teams: 1 – (2026)
- Medals: 0

World Championships
- Teams: 0

World Cup
- Seasons: 3 – (2024–2026)
- Podiums: 0
- Overall titles: 0 – (68th in 2026)
- Discipline titles: 0 – (24th in SG, 2026)

Mary Lowrey Bocock (born October 7, 2003) is an American World Cup alpine ski racer who competes in downhill, super-G, and giant slalom. She represents the United States internationally and made her Olympic debut at the 2026 Winter Olympics.

== Early life and education ==
Bocock was born in Salt Lake City, Utah. She began skiing at age two at Alta and Snowbird, where she trained alongside her siblings.

Her parents both had skiing backgrounds, contributing to her early involvement in the sport. After graduating in 2022, she enrolled at Dartmouth College in 2023 while continuing her ski career.

== Career ==
=== Junior career and development ===
Bocock entered FIS competition as a teenager and quickly progressed through the North American ranks. In 2021 she was named to the US Ski Team Development Team at age 17, becoming the youngest new member that year.

=== Breakthrough and NorAm success ===
Her major breakthrough came in the 2022–23 season when she won the Nor-Am Cup overall title, earning World Cup start opportunities and establishing herself as one of the top young North American racers.

During the 2023–24 season, Bocock made her World Cup debut on 28 October 2023 at Sölden, Austria, along with her younger sister Elisabeth. They became the first pair of sisters since 1999 to make their World Cup debuts in the same race.

=== Olympic debut ===
Bocock was selected to represent the United States at the 2026 Winter Olympics in Milan–Cortina. She competed in the super-G, where she did not finish after crashing during her run but was able to leave the course under her own power.

== Skiing style ==
Bocock primarily specializes in speed events, downhill and super-G, while also competing in giant slalom. She has been described as a versatile racer capable of competing across both technical and speed disciplines.

== Personal life ==
Bocock's younger sister, Elisabeth Bocock, is also an alpine ski racer. Outside skiing, she enjoys mountain biking, trail running, sailing, and other outdoor sports. She has expressed interest in pursuing a career as a pediatric surgeon after her skiing career.

== World Cup results ==
=== Season standings ===
Season
Season	Age	Overall	Slalom	Giant slalom	Super-G	Downhill
2026	22	68	—	—	24	45

=== Top-fifteen finishes ===
- 0 wins
- 0 podiums; 2 top fifteens

Season
Season	Date	Location	Discipline	Place
2026	January 31, 2026	Crans-Montana, Switzerland	Super-G	15th
2026	March 1, 2026	Soldeu, Andorra	Super-G	11th

== Olympic results ==
Year
Year	Age	Slalom	Giant slalom	Super-G	Downhill	Team combined
2026	22	—	—	DNF	—	—
