= Allison Mollin =

American alpine skier (born 2004)

Personal information
- Born: July 7, 2004 (age 22) Half Moon Bay, California, US
- Home town: Truckee, California, US

Skiing career
- Country: United States
- Sport: Alpine skiing
- Club: Team Palisades Tahoe
- Disciplines: Downhill, super-G
- World Cup debut: 16 February 2024 (age 19)

Olympics
- Teams: 0

World Championships
- Teams: 0

World Cup
- Seasons: 3 – (2024–2026)
- Podiums: 0
- Overall titles: 0 – (61st in 2026)
- Discipline titles: 0 – (22nd in DH, 2026)

Allison Mollin (born July 7, 2004) is an American World Cup alpine ski racer who specializes in the speed disciplines of downhill and super-G.

== Early life ==
Mollin grew up in Half Moon Bay, California and started skiing at the age of four. Her parents took the family on weekend trips to Heavenly and enrolled her in the racing program there when she was six. The family moved to Truckee when she was eleven so she could join Team Palisades Tahoe to further her race training. She became a certified ski coach to satisfy her parents' requirement that she get a summer job.

== Career ==
Mollin started racing in FIS events in 2020 at sixteen years old and made her debuts on the Nor-Am and Europa Cups during the 2021–22 season. Mollin won the 2022 US U18 National Championship in downhill and the 2023 U21 championship, and finished the 2022–23 season ranked sixth in downhill on the Nor-Am Cup while also earning points on the Europa Cup.

Mollin joined the US Ski Team's development squad for the 2023–24 season and opened the season with her first Nor-Am Cup victories in the downhill and super-G events at Copper Mountain. She made her first appearance at a major international competition at the 2024 Junior World Championships in Haute-Savoie, France, and was the top US racer in both the downhill and super-G. Mollin's World Cup debut came at the Crans-Montana downhill on February 16. She ended the season ranked first on the Nor-Am Cup in both downhill and super-G.

Mollin raced primarily in Europe during the 2024–25 season, with starts on the Europa and World Cups, but was unable to crack the top thirty to earn points on the top circuit. She was selected for her second Junior World Championships team, with the 2025 edition taking place in Tarvisio, Italy. She was again the top American in downhill and super-G, taking sixth place in both events, although she had expressed before the races that "I would like to get a podium in the downhill".

Mollin started the 2025–26 World Cup season by earning her first World Cup points at the downhill in St. Moritz, Switzerland. She followed that up by gaining points in each of her downhill starts and in two super-Gs. Her best result was thirteenth in the first downhill at Val di Fassa on March 6, and she secured a spot in the World Cup downhill final at Hafjell, Norway.

== World Cup results ==
=== Season standings ===
Season
Season	Age	Overall	Slalom	Giant slalom	Super-G	Downhill
2026	21	61	—	—	41	22

=== Top-fifteen finishes ===
- 0 podiums; 2 top fifteens

Season
Season	Date	Location	Discipline	Place
2026	January 10, 2026	Zauchensee, Austria	Downhill	14th
2026	March 6, 2026	Val di Fassa, Italy	Downhill	13th
