= Alice Robinson =

New Zealand skier (born 2001)

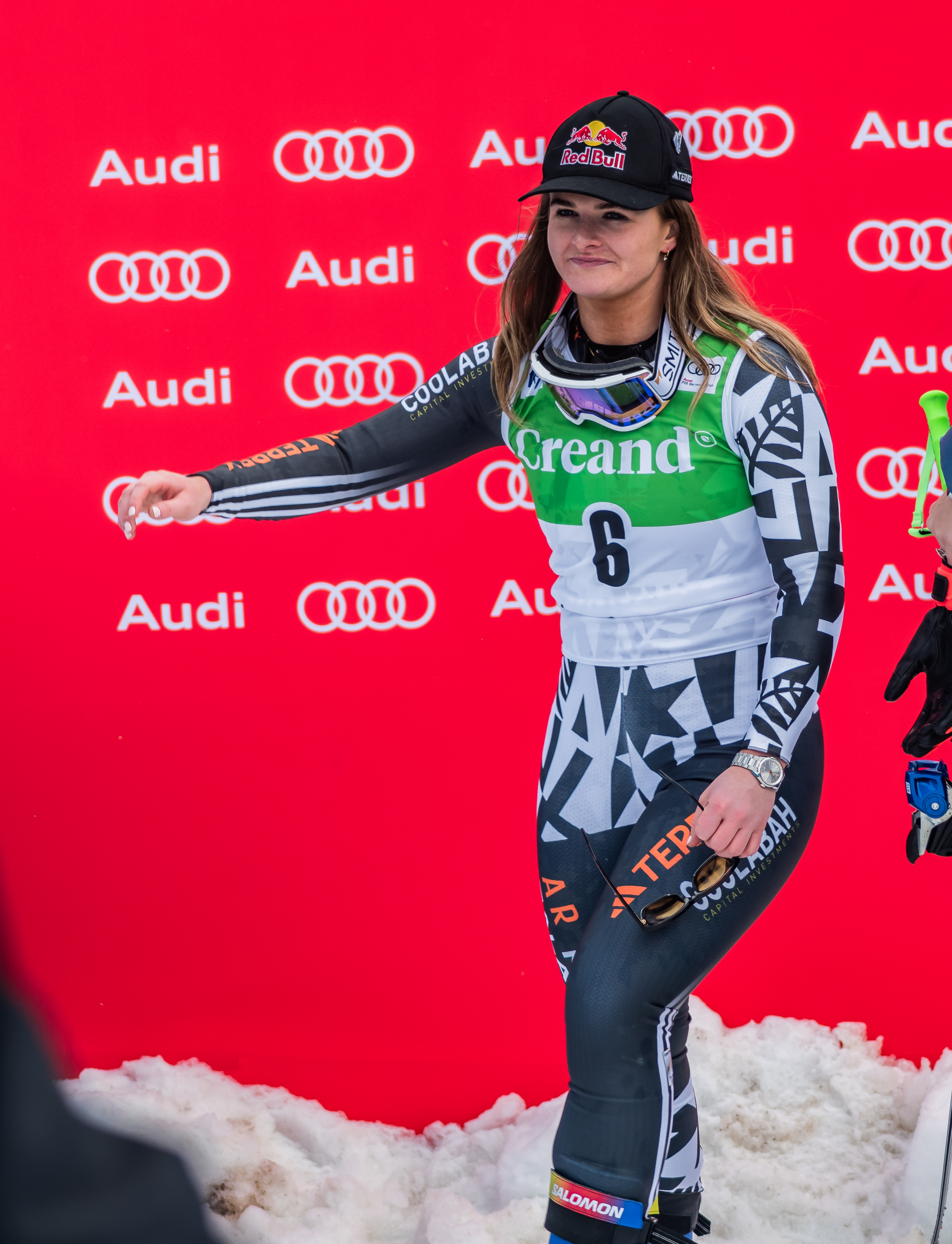
- Podium at Soldeu in February 2024

Personal information
- Born: 1 December 2001 (age 24) Sydney, Australia
- Height: 1.63 m (5 ft 4 in)

Skiing career
- Country: New Zealand
- Sport: Alpine skiing
- Club: Queenstown Alpine
- Disciplines: Giant slalom Super-G
- World Cup debut: 6 January 2018 (age 16)

Olympics
- Teams: 3 − (2018, 2022, 2026)
- Medals: 0

World Championships
- Teams: 4 − (2019–2025)
- Medals: 1 (0 gold)

World Cup
- Seasons: 10 – (2018–2027)
- Wins: 7 – (6 GS, 1 SG)
- Podiums: 24 – (21 GS, 3 SG)
- Overall titles: 0 – (5th in 2026)
- Discipline titles: 0 – (2nd in GS, 2025 and SG, 2026)
Medal record
Women's alpine skiing
Representing New Zealand
World Cup race podiums
Event	1st	2nd	3rd
Giant slalom	6	9	5
Super-G	1	2	0
Total	7	11	5
World Championships
Silver medal – second place	2025 Saalbach	Giant slalom
Junior World Championships
Gold medal – first place	2019 Val di Fassa	Giant slalom

Alice Robinson (born 1 December 2001) is an Australian Born New Zealand World Cup alpine ski racer. At age sixteen, she competed at the 2018 Winter Olympics in giant slalom and slalom. She represented New Zealand in the giant slalom event at the 2022 Winter Olympics in Beijing.

== Early life ==
Robinson was born in Sydney, Australia, the second of three children of Sarah and David Robinson. Her parents moved to Queenstown permanently when Robinson was four. She started her ski racing career at Coronet Peak with the Queenstown Alpine Ski Team and also trained in California, with the Sugar Bowl Ski Team and Academy based in Tahoe City during the northern hemisphere winter. From 2016 to 2019, Robinson was coached predominately by former New Zealand Olympian Tim Cafe. She attended Wakatipu High School in Queenstown.

Robinson won the under-14 and under-16 New Zealand titles before beginning her international career. She won the girls’ U14 giant slalom and parallel slalom in April 2015 in Canada at the Whistler Cup, one of the largest and most important junior ski races on the international calendar. and in 2017 she won the U16 giant slalom and finished second in slalom at ‘Pokal Loka in Kranjska Gora, Slovenia. Robinson also won the USSA U16 national championship giant slalom at Snowbird, Utah, and was runner-up in the super-G.

== 2018 season ==
Robinson was third in her debut FIS race on 30 July 2017 at Cardrona, then won the giant slalom the next day.

On 10 August, fifteen-year-old Robinson won the New Zealand Alpine National Championships for slalom and giant slalom at Coronet Peak. On 16 December, she won her first North America Cup (NorAm) giant slalom race at Panorama, Canada. Her 8.70 FIS point result is the best any New Zealand skier has achieved in their first year of senior competition. Robinson made her World Cup debut on 6 January 2018, in giant slalom at Kranjska Gora, Slovenia. She was 42nd and missed the cut to qualify for a second run by less than a second. Three days later, she won a FIS giant slalom race in Gaal, Austria in which she scored 11.90 FIS points, ranking her inside the top 70 in the world at the time.

On 28 January 2018, Robinson was selected to the New Zealand team for the PyeongChang 2018 Olympic Winter Games, alongside alpine racers Adam Barwood and Willis Feasey. She became New Zealand's youngest-ever Winter Olympian at 16 years and 70 days when the games began. At the Olympics, Robinson was coached by former alpine Olympians Tim Cafe and Ben Griffin. She finished 35th (of 81) in the giant slalom, the best result for a New Zealander in giant slalom at the Olympics in 38 years since Fiona Johnson and Anna Archibald were 30th and 32nd in 1980 at Lake Placid, New York. She failed to finish the first run of the slalom event.

== 2019 season ==
On 27 August 2018, Robinson won the Audi Quattro Winter Games NZ FIS Australia New Zealand Cup (ANC) Giant slalom. The following week on 5 September, she won the New Zealand Alpine National Championships for Super-G, as well as two Australia New Zealand Cup Super-G races, held at Mt Hutt.

At the World Cup giant slalom on 2 February 2019 at Maribor, Slovenia, Robinson was in 25th place after the first run, becoming the first New Zealander to qualify for the second run (the top 30 racers qualify for a second run), but failed to finish. On 9 February, at aged 17, she won the European Cup giant slalom in Berchtesgaden, Germany, becoming the first New Zealand athlete to do so since Claudia Riegler in 2001.

At the World Championships at Åre in Sweden in February, at age 17, she won the U21 category and was 17th in the giant slalom, having the fastest time in the second run. This was the best result for a New Zealand alpine ski racer since Claudia Riegler and Annelise Coberger.

Less than a week later, at the Junior World Championships in Val di Fassa, Italy, Robinson won the giant slalom by more than a second, becoming the first New Zealander to win a gold medal in the 38-year history of the Junior World Championships. She also finished in 15th-place finish in the super-G.

At the World Cup giant slalom on 8 March in Spindleruv Mlyn, Czech Republic, Robinson was 16th in a 70-strong field earned fifteen World Cup points, the first in her career. On 2 March, at the European Cup finals super-G in Sella Nevea, Italy, she was the runner-up, 0.12 seconds back.

Five days later, Robinson competed at the World Cup finals giant slalom held in Grandvalira Soldeu, Andorra. She earned a berth in the event with her victory at the Junior World Championships the month prior. At age 17, she made her first World Cup podium and finished second, 0.30 seconds behind Mikaela Shiffrin. It was the first World Cup podium for New Zealand in over sixteen years, since Riegler took third in slalom in December 2002.

Robinson was named the Otago Junior Sportswoman of the Year at the 2019 Otago Sports Awards. Her coach, Tim Cafe, was also named the Otago Coach of the Year.

On 24 June, it was announced that Robinson was splitting from Tim Cafe, who coached her for the previous eight years, citing a need for World Cup-level coaching. Chris Knight and Jeff Fergus formed the International Ski Racing Academy in 2018 and are now Robinson's full-time coaches. Knight and Fergus previously coached the United States women's team, which included four-time overall World Cup champion Lindsey Vonn.

== 2020 season ==
Robinson began the 2020 season ranked a career-best tenth in the world in giant slalom. She won both the giant slalom and the slalom at the 2019 New Zealand Alpine National Championships. On 28 August, Robinson won two Australia New Zealand Cup (ANC) super-G races held at Coronet Peak. These results mean she holds the yellow super-G ANC bib for the 2020 Northern Hemisphere race season. On 30 August, Robinson finished second in an ANC giant slalom race and was awarded the Janey Blair Memorial Trophy for being the fastest finishing New Zealand female. On 28 September, Robinson won the New Zealand Alpine ski racer athlete of the year award at Snow Sports New Zealand awards.

On 26 October 2019, Robinson gained her first World Cup win on the Rettenbach glacier in Sölden, Austria, 0.06 seconds ahead of runner-up Shiffrin. This was the first World Cup victory in any discipline for a New Zealander in over 22 years, since Claudia Riegler in February 1997, and the first-ever in women's giant slalom. She also became the youngest woman from any nation to win at Sölden. It was later revealed that she won while suffering from bone bruising to the knee following a training crash. On 7 November, Robinson announced that this injury would prevent her from starting the next GS race in Killington, Vermont; she recovered faster than expected, started the event but crashed in the opening run.

Robinson got her second World Cup victory on 15 February 2020, besting runner-up Petra Vlhová by 0.34 seconds in a giant slalom at Kranjska Gora, Slovenia. She became the first teenager in 32 years to win multiple giant slaloms in a single World Cup season, last done by Mateja Svet in 1988. On 18 February, Robinson became the joint world number one ranked skier in women's giant slalom, alongside Federica Brignone, Shiffrin, and Vlhova. She is the first New Zealander to achieve this feat in any discipline. On 8 March, Robinson was fourth in super-G at the Junior World Championships at Narvik, Norway.

Robinson won the Sky Sport Emerging Talent Award at the 2019 Halberg Awards. For the second year in a row Robinson was named the Mercy Hospital Junior Sports Woman of the Year at the 2020 ASB Otago Sports Awards ahead of snowboarder Zoi Sadowski-Synnott.

== World Cup results ==
=== Season standings ===
Season
Season	Age	Overall	Slalom	Giant slalom	Super-G	Downhill	Combined	Parallel
2019	17	62	—	19	—	—	—	—N/a
2020	18	19	—	5	—	—	34	44
2021	19	19	—	8	31	—	—N/a	19
2022	20	44	—	33	20	—	—N/a	—
2023	21	31	—	12	25	31	—N/a	—N/a
2024	22	12	—	4	17	35	—N/a	—N/a
2025	23	7	—	2nd place, silver medalist(s)	17	41	—N/a	—N/a
2026	24	5	—	5	2nd place, silver medalist(s)	36	—N/a	—N/a
2027	25	8	—	8	—	—	—N/a	—N/a

Standings through 26 October 2026

=== Race podiums ===
- 7 wins – (6 GS, 1 SG)
- 24 podiums – (21 GS, 3 SG); 51 top tens (37 GS, 14 SG)

Season
Season	Date	Location	Discipline	Place
2019	17 March 2019	Soldeu, Andorra	Giant slalom	2nd
2020	26 October 2019	Sölden, Austria	Giant slalom	1st
2020	15 February 2020	Kranjska Gora, Slovenia	Giant slalom	1st
2021	7 March 2021	Jasná, Slovakia	Giant slalom	2nd
2021	21 March 2021	Lenzerheide, Switzerland	Giant slalom	1st
2024	25 November 2023	Killington, United States	Giant slalom	2nd
2024	20 January 2024	Jasná, Slovakia	Giant slalom	3rd
2024	30 January 2024	Kronplatz, Italy	Giant slalom	2nd
2024	10 February 2024	Soldeu, Andorra	Giant slalom	2nd
2024	17 March 2024	Saalbach, Austria	Giant slalom	2nd
2025	26 October 2024	Sölden, Austria	Giant slalom	2nd
2025	28 December 2024	Semmering, Austria	Giant slalom	3rd
2025	4 January 2025	Kranjska Gora, Slovenia	Giant slalom	3rd
2025	21 January 2025	Kronplatz, Italy	Giant slalom	1st
2025	21 February 2025	Sestriere, Italy	Giant slalom	2nd
2025	22 February 2025	Sestriere, Italy	Giant slalom	3rd
2025	8 March 2025	Åre, Sweden	Giant slalom	2nd
2026	29 November 2025	Copper Mountain, United States	Giant slalom	1st
2026	6 December 2025	Tremblant, Canada	Giant slalom	1st
2026	7 December 2025	Tremblant, Canada	Giant slalom	3rd
2026	14 December 2025	St. Moritz, Switzerland	Super-G	1st
2026	21 December 2025	Val d'Isère, France	Super-G	2nd
2026	28 February 2026	Soldeu, Andorra	Super-G	2nd
2026	14 March 2026	Åre, Sweden	Giant slalom	3rd

== World Championship results ==
Year
Year	Age	Slalom	Giant slalom	Super-G	Downhill	Combined	Team combined	Parallel	Team event
2019	17	—	17	—	—	—	—N/a	—N/a	—
2021	19	—	4	—	—	—	—N/a	—	—
2023	21	—	15	7	—	DNS SL	—N/a	—	—
2025	23	—	2	11	—	—N/a	—	—N/a	—

== Olympic results ==
Year
Year	Age	Slalom	Giant slalom	Super-G	Downhill	Combined	Team combined	Team event
2018	16	DNF1	35	—	—	—	—N/a	—
2022	20	—	22	DNF	25	—	—N/a	—
2026	24	—	8	8	—	—N/a	—	—N/a

Awards
Preceded by Madison-Lee Wesche	Halberg Awards – Emerging Talent Award; 2019	Succeeded by Erika Fairweather
