= Isabella Wright =

American alpine skier (born 1997)

Bella Wright
Personal information
- Full name: Isabella Wright
- Born: February 10, 1997 (age 29) American Fork, Utah, U.S.

Skiing career
- Country: United States
- Sport: Alpine skiing
- Club: Snowbird Sports Education Foundation
- Disciplines: Downhill, Super-G, Combined
- World Cup debut: December 6, 2019 (age 22)

Olympics
- Teams: 2 – (2022, 2026)
- Medals: 0

World Championships
- Teams: 2 – (2021, 2023)
- Medals: 0

World Cup
- Seasons: 6 – (2021–2026)
- Podiums: 0
- Overall titles: 0 – (46th in 2023)
- Discipline titles: 0 – (17th in DH, 2023)

Isabella Wright (born February 10, 1997), known as Bella, is an American World Cup alpine ski racer from Salt Lake City, Utah. She focuses on the speed events of downhill and super-G, and made her World Cup debut in December 2019 in a downhill at Lake Louise, Canada.

Wright represented the United States at the World Championships in 2021 at Cortina d'Ampezzo, Italy; just outside the top twenty in the downhill and super-G, she was fourteenth in the combined, won by teammate Mikaela Shiffrin.

She represented the United States at the 2022 Winter Olympics, and finished 21st in the super-G event.

== World Cup results ==
=== Season standings ===
Season
Season	Age	Overall	Slalom	Giant slalom	Super-G	Downhill
2021	24	70	—	—	41	30
2022	25	88	—	—	52	33
2023	26	46	—	—	41	17
2024	27	70	—	—	37	29
2025	28	109	—	—	—	39
2026	29	83	—	—	48	26

=== Top-ten finishes ===
- 0 podiums, 2 top tens (2 DH)

Season
Season	Date	Location	Discipline	Place
2022	February 27, 2022	Crans-Montana, Switzerland	Downhill	10th
2023	March 15, 2023	Soldeu, Andorra	Downhill	7th

== World Championship results ==
Year
Year	Age	Slalom	Giant slalom	Super-G	Downhill	Combined
2021	24	—	—	22	21	14
2023	26	—	—	DNF	19	13

== Olympic results ==
Year
Year	Age	Slalom	Giant slalom	Super-G	Downhill	Combined	Team combined
2022	25	—	—	21	—	DNF2	—N/a
2026	29	—	—	—	21	—N/a	DNF1
