= Karl-Schranz-Piste =

Austrian ski course

- Interactive map of Karl-Schranz-Piste
- Location within Austria Location within Alps Location within Europe
- 47°06′58″N 10°15′58″E
- Location: St Anton am Arlberg, Tyrol, Austria
- Opened: 2000; 26 years ago

Downhill
- Start: 2,023 m (6,637 ft) (AA)
- Finish: 1,324 m (4,344 ft)
- Vertical drop: 681 m (2,234 ft)
- Length: 2.068 km (1.28 mi)
- Max incline: 38 degrees (78%)

Karl-Schranz-Piste is a World Cup speed ski course in western Austria at St Anton am Arlberg, Tyrol, and is named for champion ski racer Karl Schranz.

== Course ==
A very demanding downhill course, it was built for the World Championships of 2001, originally intended for men's events. It hosted World Cup super-G events a year earlier in February 2000, both for men. Since the 2008 season, only women's events have been run on this course and irregularly; at first every third year and lately in alternating years.

At the "Eisfall" section, the course has a maximum incline of 78% (38 degrees).

=== Sections ===
- Himmeleck
- Eisfall (78%)
- Fang

== World Championships ==
=== Men's events ===
Event	Type	Date	Gold	Silver	Bronze
2001	SG	30 January 2001	(United States) Daron Rahlves	(Austria) Stephan Eberharter	(Austria) Hermann Maier
2001	KB	5 January 2001	(Norway) Kjetil André Aamodt	(Austria) Mario Matt	(Switzerland) Paul Accola
2001	DH	7 January 2001	(Austria) Hannes Trinkl	(Austria) Hermann Maier	(Germany) Florian Eckert
2001	GS	8 February 2001	(Switzerland) Michael von Grünigen	(Norway) Kjetil André Aamodt	(France) Frédéric Covili

== World Cup ==
=== Men ===
No.	Type	Season	Date	Winner	Second	Third
1030	SG	1999/00	12 February 2000	(Austria) Josef Strobl	(Switzerland) Didier Cuche	(Austria) Stephan Eberharter
1031	SG	1999/00	13 February 2000	(Austria) Werner Franz (Austria) Fritz Strobl		(Austria) Hermann Maier
1180	DH	2003/04	14 February 2004	(Austria) Hermann Maier	(Austria) Stephan Eberharter	(Austria) Hans Grugger

=== Women ===
No.	Type	Season	Date	Winner	Second	Third
1227	DH	2007/08	21 December 2007	(United States) Lindsey Vonn	(Canada) Kelly VanderBeek	(United States) Julia Mancuso
1228	SC	2007/08	22 December 2007	(United States) Lindsey Vonn	(Germany) Maria Riesch	(United States) Julia Mancuso
1406	DH	2012/13	12 January 2013	(United States) Alice McKennis	(Italy) Daniela Merighetti	(Austria) Anna Fenninger
1407	SG	2012/13	13 January 2013	(Slovenia) Tina Maze	(Austria) Anna Fenninger	(Switzerland) Fabienne Suter
	DH	2015/16	9 January 2016	warm temperatures and lack of snow; replaced in Zauchensee		
	SG	2015/16	10 January 2016	warm temperatures and lack of snow; replaced in Zauchensee		
	DH	2018/19	12 January 2019	over three metres of snow; rescheduled on 18 January 2019 in Cortina d'Ampezzo		
	SG	2018/19	13 January 2019	over three metres of snow; not rescheduled		
1678	DH	2020/21	9 January 2021	(Italy) Sofia Goggia	(Austria) Tamara Tippler	(United States) Breezy Johnson
1679	SG	2020/21	10 January 2021	(Switzerland) Lara Gut-Behrami	(Italy) Marta Bassino	(Switzerland) Corinne Suter
	DH	2022/23	14 January 2023	program changes; DH replaced with Super-G		
1754	SG	2022/23	14 January 2023	(Italy) Federica Brignone	(Switzerland) Joana Hählen	(Switzerland) Lara Gut-Behrami
1755	SG	2022/23	15 January 2023	(Switzerland) Lara Gut-Behrami	(Italy) Federica Brignone	(Italy) Marta Bassino
1824	DH	2024/25	11 January 2025	(Italy) Federica Brignone	(Switzerland) Malorie Blanc	(Czech Republic) Ester Ledecká
1825	SG	2024/25	12 January 2025	(United States) Lauren Macuga	(Austria) Stephanie Venier	(Italy) Federica Brignone
