= Marte Monsen =

Norwegian alpine skier (born 2000)

Personal information
- Born: 27 January 2000 (age 26) Drammen, Norway
- Family: Marcus Monsen (brother)

Skiing career
- Country: Norway
- Sport: Alpine skiing
- Club: Aron Skiklubb
- Disciplines: Downhill, Super-G, Giant slalom
- World Cup debut: 21 December 2018 (age 18)

World Championships
- Teams: 1 – (2025)
- Medals: 0

World Cup
- Seasons: 8 – (2019–2026)
- Podiums: 0
- Overall titles: 0 – (61st in 2025)
- Discipline titles: 0 – (6th in PAR, 2022)

Marte Monsen (born 27 January 2000) is a Norwegian World Cup alpine ski racer.

== Career ==
She competed at the 2017, 2018, and 2019 Junior World Championships; of the twelve events in total, her best result was fifth in the giant slalom in 2018.

Monsen made her World Cup debut in December 2018 in Courchevel, but was disqualified, and failed to finish her next race as well as the 2019–2020 season opener in Sölden. She collected her first World Cup points with a 26th place in the giant slalom in January 2020 in Sestriere.

She represents the sports club Aron SK, and is a younger sister of Marcus Monsen.

== World Cup results ==
=== Season standings ===
Season
Season	Age	Overall	Slalom	Giant slalom	Super-G	Downhill	Combined	Parallel
2020	20	117	—	46	—	—	—	—
2021	21	—	—	—	—	—	—N/a	—
2022	22	85	—	—	—	—	—N/a	6
2023	23	—	—	—	—	—	—N/a	—N/a
2024	24	117	—	50	—	—	—N/a	—N/a
2025	25	61	—	—	41	20	—N/a	—N/a
2026	26	53	—	—	43	19	—N/a	—N/a

=== Top-ten results ===
- 0 podiums, 5 top tens (4 DH, 1 PG)

Season
Season	Date	Location	Discipline	Place
2022	13 November 2021	Lech / Zürs, Austria	Parallel-G	6th
2025	1 March 2025	Kvitfjell, Norway	Downhill	7th
2026	13 December 2025	St. Moritz, Switzerland	Downhill	9th
2026	17 January 2026	Tarvisio, Italy	Downhill	9th
2026	7 March 2026	Val di Fassa, Italy	Downhill	9th

== World Championship results ==
Year
Year	Age	Slalom	Giant slalom	Super-G	Downhill	Team combined	Team event
2025	25	—	—	DNF	17	—	—

== Europa Cup results ==
Monsen has won an overall Europa Cup and one specialty standings.

- FIS Alpine Ski Europa Cup
  - Overall: 2021
  - Giant slalom: 2021
