= Malorie Blanc =

Swiss alpine skier (born 2004)

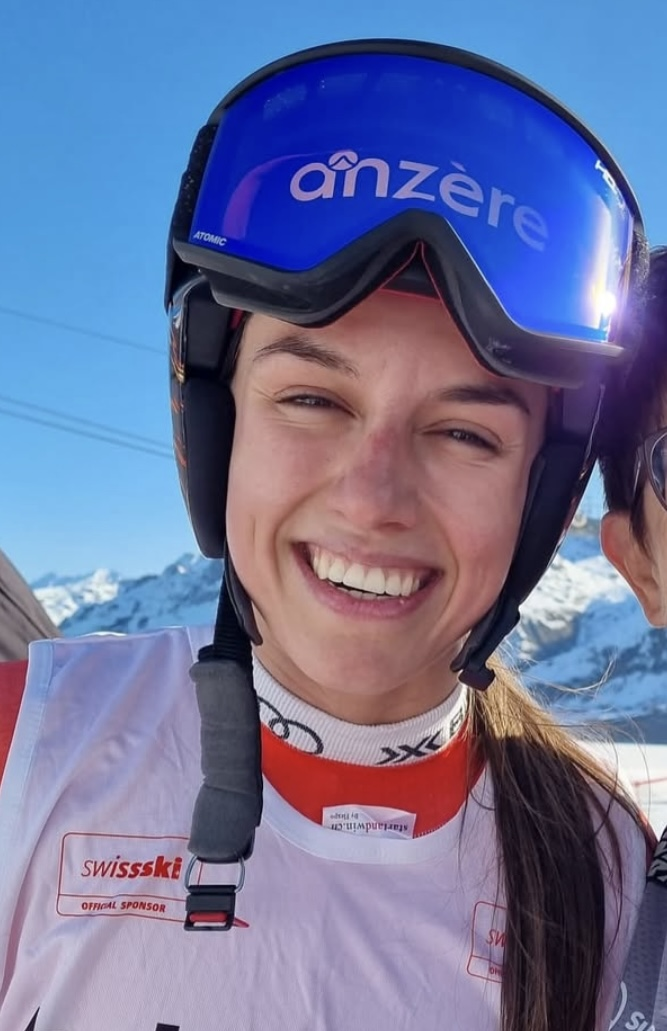
- Blanc in 2025

Personal information
- Born: 6 January 2004 (age 22) Aigle, Vaud, Switzerland
- Website: malo-blanc.ch

Skiing career
- Country: Switzerland
- Sport: Alpine skiing
- Disciplines: Super-G, downhill
- World Cup debut: 21 December 2024 (age 20)

Olympics
- Teams: 1 – (2026)
- Medals: 0

World Championships
- Teams: 1 – (2025)
- Medals: 0

World Cup
- Seasons: 2 – (2025–2026)
- Wins: 1 – (1 SG)
- Podiums: 2 – (1 SG, 1 DH)
- Overall titles: 0 – (26th in 2026)
- Discipline titles: 0 – (7th in SG, 2026)
Medal record
Women's alpine skiing
Representing Switzerland
World Cup race podiums
| Event | 1st | 2nd | 3rd |
|---|---|---|---|
| Super-G | 1 | 0 | 0 |
| Downhill | 0 | 1 | 0 |
| Total | 1 | 1 | 0 |
Junior World Championships
| Gold medal – first place | 2024 Haute-Savoie | Super-G |
| Gold medal – first place | 2024 Haute-Savoie | Team Combined |
| Silver medal – second place | 2024 Haute-Savoie | Downhill |

Malorie "Malo" Blanc (French pronunciation: [malɔʁi blɑ̃]; born 6 January 2004) is a Swiss World Cup alpine ski racer who specializes in speed disciplines. She achieved her first victory in Crans-Montana, Switzerland on 31 January 2026.

== Career ==
Blanc is from Ayent, Valais nearby Sion. She won gold medals in super-G and team alpine combined at the 2024 World Junior Alpine Skiing Championships; she was only the third French-speaking Swiss skier to win a junior world title.

Blanc made her World Cup debut in December 2024. On 11 January 2025, in just her second World Cup race, she finished second in the downhill behind Federica Brignone. Her first victory came in super-G in Crans-Montana, Switzerland on 31 January 2026, located 20 minutes from where Blanc was raised.

Malorie Blanc represented Switzerland at the 2026 Winter Olympic Games in Milano/Cortina.

== World Cup results ==
=== Season standings ===
Season
| Season | Age | Overall | Slalom | Giant slalom | Super-G | Downhill |
| 2025 | 21 | 45 | — | — | 25 | 18 |
| 2026 | 22 | 26 | — | — | 7 | 23 |

=== Top-ten results ===
- 1 win – (1 SG)
- 2 podiums – (1 SG, 1 DH), 6 top tens

Season
| Season | Date | Location | Discipline | Place |
| 2025 | 11 January 2025 | St Anton, Austria | Downhill | 2nd |
| 2025 | 12 January 2025 | St Anton, Austria | Super-G | 9th |
| 2026 | 14 December 2025 | St. Moritz, Switzerland | Super-G | 6th |
| 2026 | 31 January 2026 | Crans-Montana, Switzerland | Super-G | 1st |
| 2026 | 8 March 2026 | Val di Fassa, Italy | Super-G | 6th |
| 2026 | 22 March 2026 | Kvitfjell, Norway | Super-G | 9th |

== World Championship results ==
Year
| Year | Age | Slalom | Giant slalom | Super-G | Downhill | Team combined | Team event |
| 2025 | 21 | — | — | 12 | 19 | 15 | — |

== Olympic results ==
Year
| Year | Age | Slalom | Giant slalom | Super-G | Downhill | Team combined |
| 2026 | 22 | — | — | 10 | 19 | — |
