= Keely Cashman =

American alpine skier (born 1999)

Personal information
- Born: April 4, 1999 (age 27) Sonora, California, U.S.
- Height: 5 ft 11 in (180 cm)

Skiing career
- Country: United States
- Sport: Alpine skiing
- Club: Dodge Ridge Race, Bear Valley Team, Palisades Tahoe
- Disciplines: Slalom, giant slalom, super-G, downhill, combined
- World Cup debut: January 10, 2017 (age 17)

Olympics
- Teams: 2 – (2022, 2026)
- Medals: 0

World Championships
- Teams: 1 – (2025)
- Medals: 0

World Cup
- Seasons: 8 – (2017, 2020–2026)
- Podiums: 0
- Overall titles: 0 – (36th in 2026)
- Discipline titles: 0 – (14th in SG, 2026)
Medal record
Women's alpine skiing
Representing the United States
Junior World Championships
Bronze medal – third place	2020 Narvik	Combined

Keely Cashman (born April 4, 1999) is an American World Cup alpine ski racer. From northern California, she represented the United States at the 2022 and 2026 Winter Olympics, as well as the 2025 World Championships.

== Career ==
Cashman made her World Cup debut in January 2017, and competed at the 2020 Junior World Championships, where she won a bronze medal in the combined discipline.

Cashman qualified for the 2021 World Championships, however, she missed the competition due to injury. During training for the 2020–21 season, she crashed and was unconscious and suffered brain damage. She was hospitalized for eight days following her crash, as she sustained a minor MCL strain, hematoma in both hips, and a temporary loss of feeling in her foot from bruising. As a result, this ended her season early.

Cashman represented the United States at the 2022 Winter Olympics, where she finished 27th in the super-G and 17th in the downhill, the top American finisher.

She returned to the Olympics for the 2026 Milan Cortina games, where she took 15th place in both the super-G and the new team combined event. For the team combined, she was partnered with long-time friend AJ Hurt.

== World Cup results ==
=== Season standings ===
Season
Season	Age	Overall	Slalom	Giant slalom	Super-G	Downhill	Parallel
2021	21	70	—	—	35	32	—
2022	22	108	—	—	47	47	—
2023	23	112	—	—	—	44	—N/a
2024	24	104	—	—	51	40	—N/a
2025	25	69	—	—	28	43	—N/a
2026	26	36	—	—	14	27	—N/a

=== Top-ten results ===
- 0 podiums, 4 top tens (4 SG)

Season
Season	Date	Location	Discipline	Place
2021	December 26, 2020	Val-d'Isère, France	Super-G	10th
2025	January 26, 2025	Garmisch-Partenkirchen, Germany	Super-G	6th
2026	January 18, 2026	Tarvisio, Italy	Super-G	5th
2026	March 22, 2026	Kvitfjell, Norway	Super-G	10th

== World Championship results ==
Year
Year	Age	Slalom	Giant slalom	Super-G	Downhill	Team combined	Team event
2025	25	—	—	24	—	—	—

== Olympic results ==
Year
Year	Age	Slalom	Giant slalom	Super-G	Downhill	Combined	Team combined	Team event
2022	22	—	—	27	17	DNF2	—N/a	—
2026	26	—	—	15	—	—N/a	15	—N/a

== United States championships ==
- United States giant slalom champion in 2019
