= Roberta Melesi =

Italian alpine skier (born 1996)

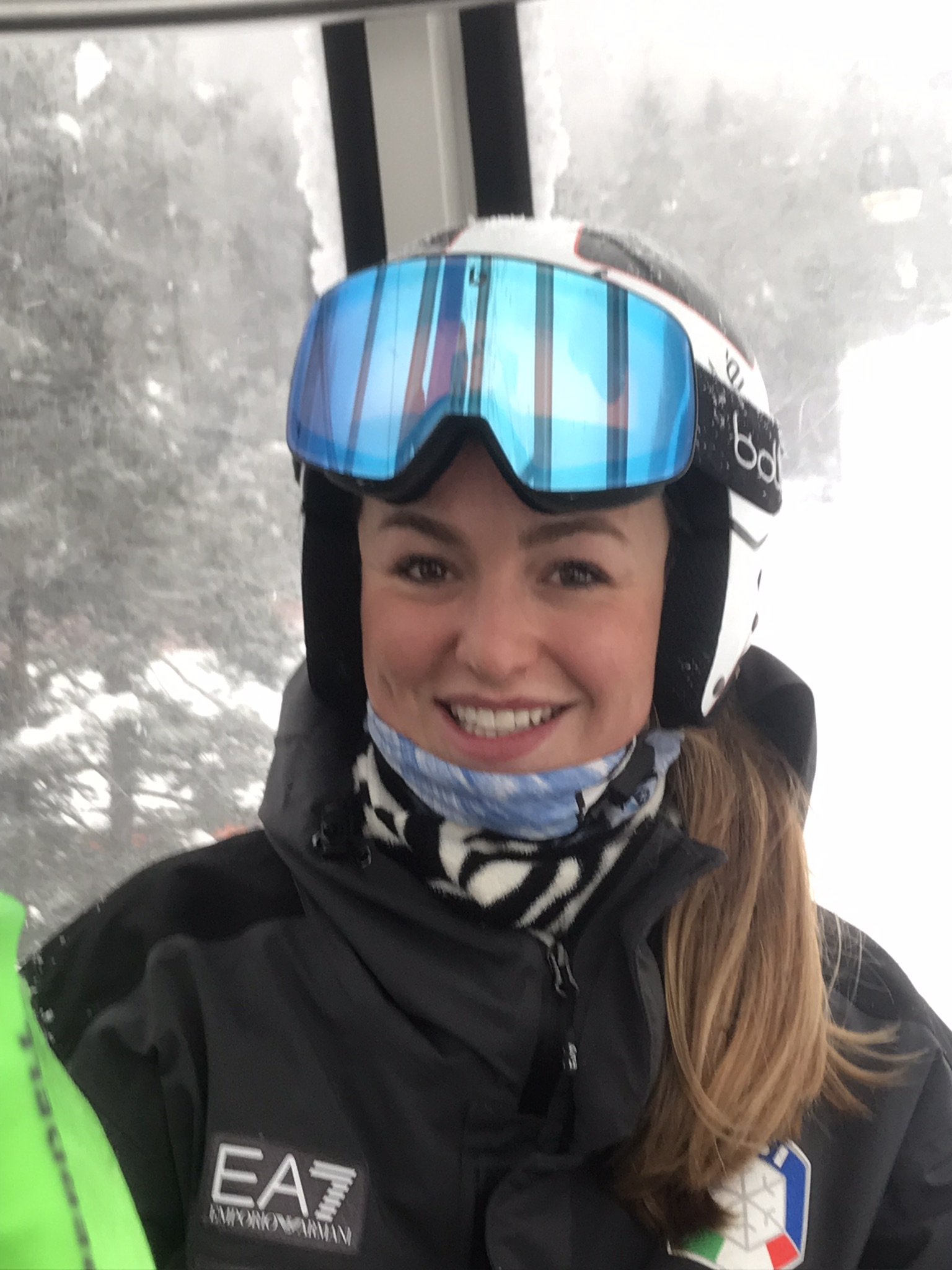
- Melesi in 2023

Personal information
- Born: 18 July 1996 (age 30) Lecco, Italy
- Height: 1.67 m (5 ft 6 in)

Skiing career
- Country: Italy
- Sport: Alpine skiing
- Club: G.S. Fiamme Oro
- Disciplines: Super-G, Downhill, Giant slalom
- World Cup debut: 29 December 2017 (age 21)

Olympics
- Teams: 0

World Championships
- Teams: 0

World Cup
- Seasons: 9 – (2018–2026)
- Podiums: 0
- Overall titles: 0 – (44th in 2026)
- Discipline titles: 0 – (17th in SG, 2026)

Roberta Melesi (born 18 July 1996) is an Italian World Cup alpine ski racer.

== Career ==
During her World Cup career, she has achieved two top ten results, both in super-G, last one on 31 January 2026 in Crans Montana. On March 6, 2026, in the World Cup downhill race at Passo San Pellegrino-Falcade in Val di Fassa on the Volata slope, despite starting with a bib size 39, she achieved 15th place, her best ever placing in a World Cup downhill race.

== World Cup results ==
=== Season standings ===
Season
Season	Age	Overall	Slalom	Giant slalom	Super-G	Downhill	Combined	Parallel
2020	23	113	—	43	—	—	—	—
2021	24	75	—	55	33	43	—N/a	—
2022	25	77	—	43	39	—	—N/a	—
2023	26	65	—	34	32	—	—N/a	—N/a
2024	27	51	—	29	19	43	—N/a	—N/a
2025	28	51	—	48	21	37	—N/a	—N/a
2026	29	44	—	—	17	28	—N/a	—N/a

=== Top-ten results ===
- 0 podiums, 2 top tens (2 SG)

Season
Season	Date	Location	Discipline	Place
2024	14 January 2024	Zauchensee, Austria	Super-G	6th
2026	31 January 2026	Crans-Montana, Switzerland	Super-G	4th
