= Zenere =

Zenere is an Italian surname. Notable people with the surname include:

- Asja Zenere (born 1996), Italian alpine skier
- Valentina Zenere (born 1997), Argentine actress, model and singer
