= Asja Zenere =

Italian alpine skier (born 1996)

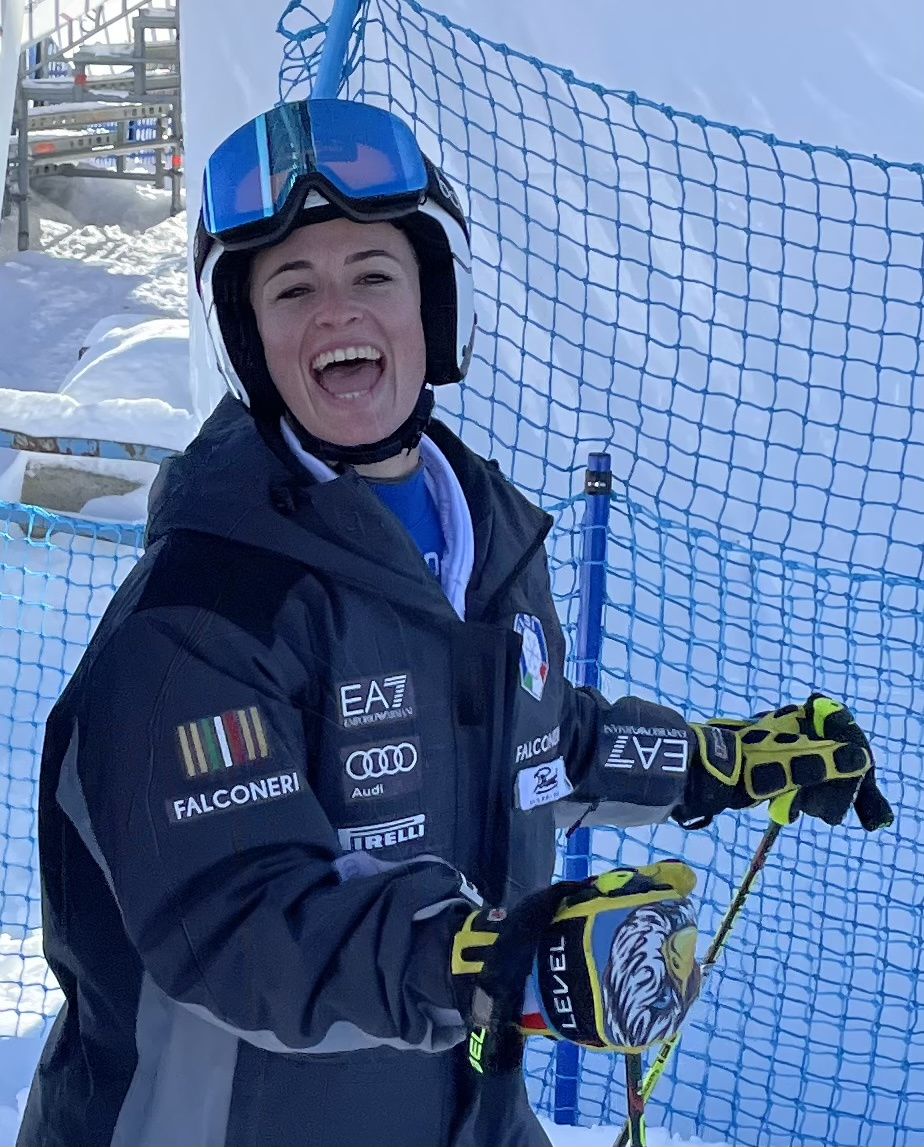
- Zenere in 2022

Personal information
- Born: 13 December 1996 (age 29) Bassano del Grappa, Vicenza, Veneto, Italy
- Height: 1.68 m (5 ft 6 in)

Skiing career
- Country: Italy
- Sport: Alpine skiing
- Club: G.S. Carabinieri
- Disciplines: Giant slalom, super-G, downhill
- World Cup debut: 6 March 2022 (age 25)

Olympics
- Teams: 1 – (2026)
- Medals: 0

World Championships
- Teams: 1 – (2023)
- Medals: 0

World Cup
- Seasons: 6 – (2022–2027)
- Wins: 0
- Podiums: 1 – (1 SG)
- Overall titles: 0 – (39th in 2026)
- Discipline titles: 0 – (21st in GS, 2026)

Asja Zenere (born 13 December 1996) is an Italian World Cup alpine ski racer. She competes in the disciplines of giant slalom, super-G, and downhill. Zenere represented Italy in the 2023 World Championships and the 2026 Winter Olympics.

== Career ==
Zenere made her World Cup debut at age 25 on 6 March 2022. She has achieved four top tens, the firth three during the 2026 season; the first of which being a 9th place in giant slalom at Copper Mountain, Colorado, US and the second one being Zenere's first World Cup podium - a third place in a super-G at Val di Fassa, Italy. Her third top ten came in a giant slalom at Åre in tenth place.

== World Cup results ==
=== Season standings ===
Season
| Season | Age | Overall | Slalom | Giant slalom | Super-G | Downhill |
| 2023 | 26 | 81 | — | 32 | — | — |
| 2024 | 27 | 84 | — | 35 | — | — |
| 2025 | 28 | 67 | — | 31 | 35 | — |
| 2026 | 29 | 39 | — | 21 | 23 | 51 |
| 2027 | 30 | 5 | — | 5 | — | — |

Standings through 25 October 2026

=== Top ten finishes ===
- 0 wins
- 1 podium (1 SG), 4 top tens

Season
| Season | Date | Location | Discipline | Place |
| 2026 | 29 November 2025 | Copper Mountain, United States | Giant slalom | 9th |
| 2026 | 8 March 2026 | Val di Fassa, Italy | Super-G | 3rd |
| 2026 | 14 March 2026 | Åre, Sweden | Giant slalom | 10th |
| 2027 | 24 October 2026 | Sölden, Austria | Giant slalom | 5th |

== World Championship results ==
Year
| Year | Age | Slalom | Giant slalom | Super-G | Downhill | Combined | Parallel | Team event |
| 2023 | 26 | — | 22 | — | — | — | — | — |

== Olympic results ==
Year
| Year | Age | Slalom | Giant slalom | Super-G | Downhill | Team combined |
| 2026 | 29 | — | 14 | — | — | — |
