= FIS Alpine World Ski Championships 2025 – Women's super-G =

Women's super-G at the FIS Alpine World Ski Championships 2025
- Venue: Skicircus Saalbach-Hinterglemm/Leogang
- Location: Saalbach, Austria
- Dates: 6 February
- Competitors: 40 from 19 nations
- Winning time: 1:20.47

Medalists
| gold medal | Stephanie Venier | Austria |
| silver medal | Federica Brignone | Italy |
| bronze medal | Kajsa Vickhoff Lie | Norway |
| bronze medal | Lauren Macuga | United States |

Women's Super-G
- Location: Ulli Maier; Saalbach, Austria
- Vertical: 584 m (1,916 ft)
- Top elevation: 1,656 m (5,433 ft)
- Base elevation: 1,072 m (3,517 ft)
- Longest run: 2.100 km (1.30 mi)

The Women's super-G competition at the FIS Alpine World Ski Championships 2025 was held on Thursday, 6 February 2025. It was the first individual event of these championships.

== Results ==
The race was started at 11:30 CET (UTC+1) under sunny skies; the air temperature was −2 °C (28 °F) at the start and finish.

| Rank | Bib | Name | Country | Time | Diff |
|---|---|---|---|---|---|
| 1st place, gold medalist(s) | 7 | Stephanie Venier | Austria | 1:20.47 | — |
| 2nd place, silver medalist(s) | 6 | Federica Brignone | Italy | 1:20.57 | +0.10 |
| 3rd place, bronze medalist(s) | 10 | Kajsa Vickhoff Lie | Norway | 1:20.71 | +0.24 |
| 3rd place, bronze medalist(s) | 14 | Lauren Macuga | United States | 1:20.71 | +0.24 |
| 5 | 11 | Sofia Goggia | Italy | 1:20.77 | +0.30 |
| 6 | 20 | Emma Aicher | Germany | 1:20.99 | +0.52 |
| 7 | 12 | Ester Ledecká | Czech Republic | 1:21.10 | +0.63 |
| 8 | 9 | Lara Gut-Behrami | Switzerland | 1:21.17 | +0.70 |
| 9 | 13 | Elena Curtoni | Italy | 1:21.23 | +0.76 |
| 10 | 15 | Cornelia Hütter | Austria | 1:21.38 | +0.91 |
| 11 | 16 | Alice Robinson | New Zealand | 1:21.60 | +1.13 |
| 12 | 26 | Malorie Blanc | Switzerland | 1:21.66 | +1.19 |
| 13 | 1 | Laura Gauché | France | 1:21.69 | +1.22 |
| 14 | 8 | Corinne Suter | Switzerland | 1:21.73 | +1.26 |
| 15 | 17 | Romane Miradoli | France | 1:22.06 | +1.59 |
| 16 | 5 | Marta Bassino | Italy | 1:22.10 | +1.63 |
| 17 | 4 | Michelle Gisin | Switzerland | 1:22.11 | +1.64 |
| 18 | 2 | Laura Pirovano | Italy | 1:22.19 | +1.72 |
| 19 | 23 | Breezy Johnson | United States | 1:22.20 | +1.73 |
| 20 | 38 | Cassidy Gray | Canada | 1:22.23 | +1.76 |
| 21 | 19 | Ariane Rädler | Austria | 1:22.27 | +1.80 |
| 22 | 22 | Ilka Štuhec | Slovenia | 1:22.32 | +1.85 |
| 23 | 18 | Kira Weidle-Winkelmann | Germany | 1:22.36 | +1.89 |
| 24 | 27 | Keely Cashman | United States | 1:22.46 | +1.99 |
| 25 | 29 | Camille Cerutti | France | 1:22.51 | +2.04 |
| 26 | 21 | Karen Clément | France | 1:22.61 | +2.14 |
| 27 | 25 | Elvedina Muzaferija | Bosnia and Herzegovina | 1:22.80 | +2.33 |
| 28 | 34 | Cande Moreno | Andorra | 1:23.23 | +2.76 |
| 29 | 33 | Barbora Nováková | Czech Republic | 1:25.30 | +4.83 |
| 30 | 32 | Jordina Caminal | Andorra | 1:26.02 | +5.55 |
| 31 | 36 | Anastasiya Shepilenko | Ukraine | 1:28.05 | +7.58 |
| | 3 | Ricarda Haaser | Austria | Did not finish | |
| | 24 | Valérie Grenier | Canada | Did not finish | |
| | 28 | Maryna Gąsienica-Daniel | Poland | Did not finish | |
| | 30 | Lindsey Vonn | United States | Did not finish | |
| | 31 | Marte Monsen | Norway | Did not finish | |
| | 35 | Giselle Gorringe | Great Britain | Did not finish | |
| | 39 | Hólmfríður Dóra Friðgeirsdóttir | Iceland | Did not finish | |
| | 37 | Sabrina Simader | Kenya | Disqualified | |
| | 40 | Greta Small | Australia | Disqualified | |
