= Störtloppsbacken =

Ski course in Åre, Sweden

- Interactive map of Störtloppsbacken
- Location within Europe Location within Sweden
- 63°24′00″N 13°04′59″E
- Location: Åre, Sweden
- Mountain: Åreskutan
- Resort: Åre ski resort

Giant slalom
- Start: 812 m (2,664 ft) (AA)
- Finish: 396 m (1,299 ft)
- Vertical drop: 416 m (1,365 ft)
- Max incline: 28.8 degrees (55%)

Slalom
- Start: 586 m (1,923 ft) (AA)
- Finish: 396 m (1,299 ft)
- Vertical drop: 190 m (623 ft)

Störtloppsbacken is a women's World Cup technical ski course in Åre, Sweden, located on Åreskutan mountain. Other World Cup courses in Are are Gästrappet, Olympia, and WM Strecke.

The Störtloppsbacken course has a maximum gradient of 55% (28.8°), a minimum of 9%, and averages 32%.

American Mikaela Shiffrin has the most World Cup wins on the slope with four; three in slalom and one in giant slalom.

== History ==
In 2023, the first-ever World Cup race was held on this course, a women's giant slalom. It was won by Mikaela Shiffrin, her 86th World Cup victory, which tied the all-time record set in 1989 by Swedish legend Ingemar Stenmark. Her slalom victory in 2026 was her 109th World Cup win, and 72nd in slalom.

== Course ==
=== Sections ===
- Stövelbranten
- Brinks Brant
- Russisprung
- Galbacken
- Jipen
- Målbranten

== World Cup ==
=== Women ===
Season	Date	Event	Winner	Second	Third
2022/23	10 March 2023	GS	(United States) Mikaela Shiffrin	(Italy) Federica Brignone	(Sweden) Sara Hector
2022/23	11 March 2023	SL	(United States) Mikaela Shiffrin	(Switzerland) Wendy Holdener	(Sweden) Anna Swenn Larsson
2023/24	9 March 2024	GS	(Italy) Federica Brignone	(Sweden) Sara Hector	(Switzerland) Lara Gut-Behrami
2023/24	10 March 2024	SL	(United States) Mikaela Shiffrin	(Sweden) Zrinka Ljutić	(Switzerland) Michelle Gisin
2024/25	8 March 2025	GS	(Italy) Federica Brignone	(New Zealand) Alice Robinson	(Albania) Lara Colturi
2024/25	9 March 2025	SL	(Austria) Katharina Truppe	(Austria) Katharina Liensberger	(United States) Mikaela Shiffrin
2025/26	14 March 2026	GS	(Austria) Julia Scheib	(United States) Paula Moltzan	(New Zealand) Alice Robinson
2025/26	15 March 2026	SL	(United States) Mikaela Shiffrin	(Germany) Emma Aicher	(Switzerland) Wendy Holdener
