= Nor-Am Cup =

International Ski Federation tour

The Nor-Am Cup (North American Cup) is one of the tours of competitions organized by the International Ski Federation, and it takes place in North America.

The Nor-Am Cup gives athletes who have qualified for these races the opportunity to compete against athletes from other countries. The equivalent tour in Europe is the Europa Cup, and, in Australia and New Zealand, there is the Australian and New Zealand Cup, where athletes from surrounding countries such as Japan compete. In alpine skiing, all of these cups (Nor-Am, Europa, and the Australian and New Zealand Cup), are the level of competition just below the World Cup, and above the regional competition circuits (e.g. USASA (The United States of America Snowboard and Freeski Association). The USASA, not to be confused with the USSS (the governing body for skiing and snowboarding in the United States of America) is divided into several geographic regions where athletes can compete, and an athlete is assigned to a geographic area, such as the Eastern Division or the Rocky Mountain Division, based on the athlete's residence and ski club.

The different disciplines on the Nor-Am Cup are Alpine skiing, Biathlon, Cross-country skiing, Freestyle skiing, and Snowboarding.

== Cross-country skiing ==
In cross-country skiing, the Nor-Am Cup is one of nine Continental Cups across the world.

== Death of Max Burkhart ==
On December 5, 2017, one of the contestants, Max Burkhart (de), was injured when he crashed into a safety fence during a race in Lake Louise. His death was confirmed by the International Ski Federation a day after.
