= La VolatA =

Ski course in Italy

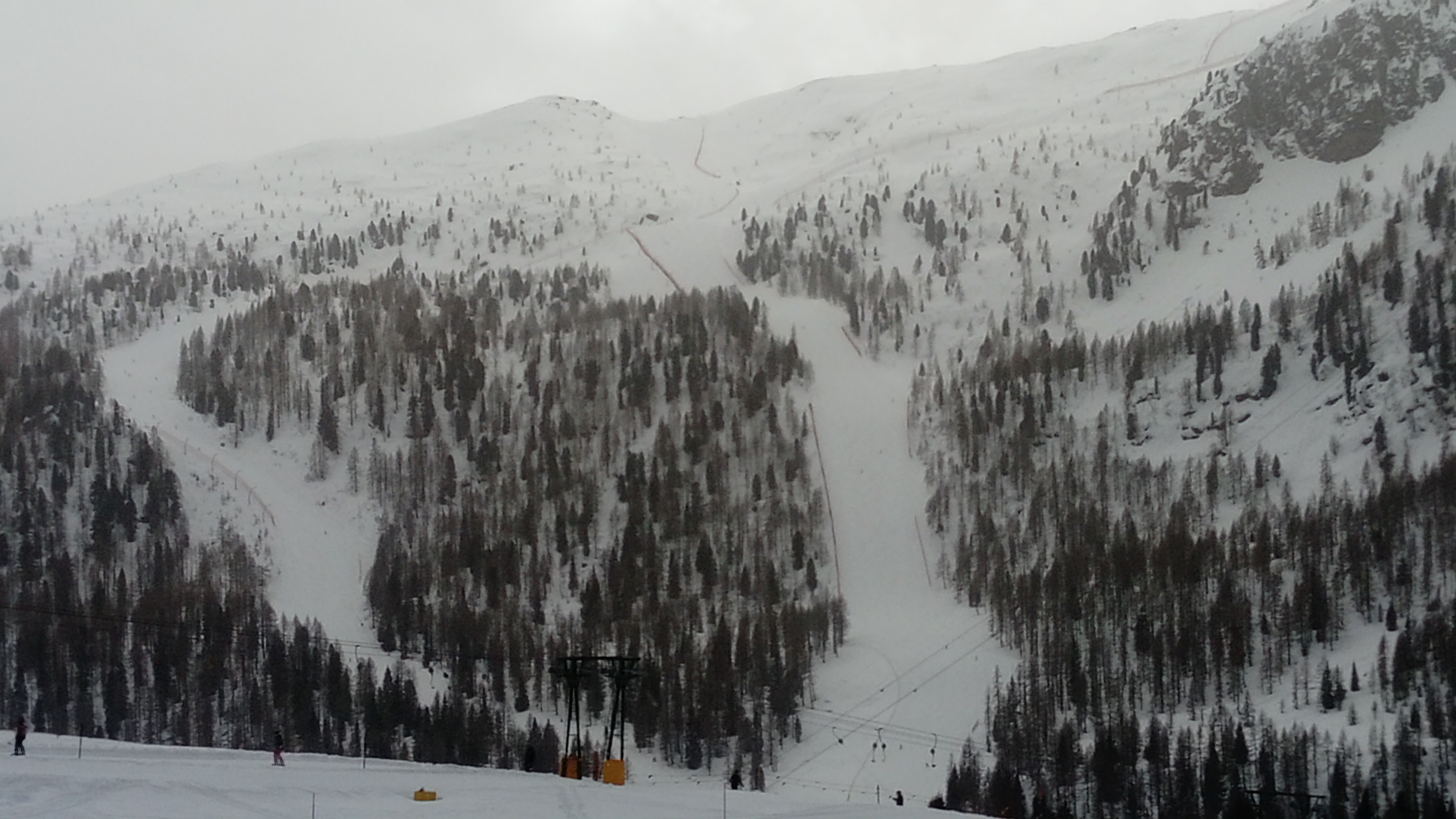
- Interactive map of La VolatA
- Location within Italy Location within Alps Location within Europe
- 46°22′37″N 11°48′04″E
- Location: Val di Fassa, Dolomites, Trentino, Italy

Downhill
- Start: 2,510 m (8,235 ft) (AA)
- Finish: 1,880 m (6,168 ft)
- Vertical drop: 630 m (2,067 ft)
- Length: 2.274 km (1.41 mi)
- Max incline: 25.2 degrees (47%)
- Avg incline: 14.6 degrees (26%)
- Min incline: 7.4 degrees (13%)

Super-G
- Start: 2,465 m (8,087 ft) (AA)
- Finish: 1,880 m (6,168 ft)
- Vertical drop: 585 m (1,919 ft)
- Length: 2.142 km (1.33 mi)

La VolatA is a women's World Cup downhill ski course in northern Italy, located at Val di Fassa in the Dolomites in northeastern Trentino.

== History ==
Its World Cup debut was ten years ago in late February 2021, however none of the three events (2 DH, 1 SG) were on the original schedule; they were replacements for Garmisch-Partenkirchen, Germany, and Yanqing, China. Lara Gut-Behrami won both downhills.

In 2024, competition returned as originally planned, but both women's super-Gs were cancelled due to heavy snowfall and one of the two races was moved to Kvitfjell, Norway.

In early March 2026, the first of two women's downhills at Val di Fassa was a replacement event, this time for a halted race at Crans-Montana in late January.

== Course ==
=== Sections ===
- Muro Mafroi
- La Piana
- I Muri Del Poeta
- Dosso Del Camoscio

== World Cup ==
=== Women ===
Season	Date	Event	Winner	Second	Third
2020/21	26 February 2021	DH	(Switzerland) Lara Gut-Behrami	(Austria) Ramona Siebenhofer	(Switzerland) Corinne Suter
2020/21	27 February 2021	DH	(Switzerland) Lara Gut-Behrami	(Switzerland) Corinne Suter	(Germany) Kira Weidle
2020/21	28 February 2021	SG	(Italy) Federica Brignone	(Switzerland) Lara Gut-Behrami	(Switzerland) Corinne Suter
2023/24	25 February 2024	SG	cancelled due to heavy snowfall (one race moved to Kvitfjell on 2 March)		
2023/24	26 February 2024	SG	cancelled due to heavy snowfall (one race moved to Kvitfjell on 2 March)		
2025/26	6 March 2026	DH	(Italy) Laura Pirovano	(Germany) Emma Aicher	(United States) Breezy Johnson
2025/26	7 March 2026	DH	(Italy) Laura Pirovano	(Austria) Cornelia Hütter	(Switzerland) Corinne Suter
2025/26	8 March 2026	SG	(Italy) Elena Curtoni	(Norway) Kajsa Vickhoff Lie	(Italy) Asja Zenere

Not in original World Cup calendar. Replacement for Ga-Pa, Yanqing (2021) and Crans-Montana (2026).
