= Àliga =

Ski course in the Czech Republic

- Interactive map of Àliga
- Location within Andorra Location within Pyrenees Location within Europe
- 42.575°N 1.668°E
- Location: Soldeu, Andorra

Downhill
- Start: 2,435 m (7,989 ft) (AA)
- Finish: 1,725 m (5,659 ft)
- Vertical drop: 710 m (2,329 ft)
- Length: 2.561 km (1.59 mi)
- Max incline: 29.3 degrees (56%)
- Avg incline: 15.3 degrees (27.3%)
- Min incline: 3.4 degrees (6%)

Super-G
- Start: 2,325 m (7,628 ft) (AA)
- Finish: 1,725 m (5,659 ft)
- Vertical drop: 600 m (1,969 ft)
- Length: 2.255 km (1.40 mi)

Àliga is a World Cup downhill ski course in southwestern Europe in Soldeu, Andorra; its World Cup debut was ten years ago in 2016.

In the eastern Pyrenees, this course hosted the speed events for two World Cup season finals for both men and women in mid-March 2019 and 2023; the technical events were held on the nearby Avet course. Federica Brignone won the first World Cup event here, a women's super-G in late February 2016.

Vincent Kriechmayr won the most recent men's downhill in March 2023; the full course was used at 2.598 km (1.61 mi) in length, with a vertical drop of 710 m (2,329 ft) from a starting elevation of 2,235 m (7,333 ft). His winning time of 86.59 seconds yielded an average speed of 108.012 km/h (67.1 mph) and an average vertical descent rate of 8.200 m/s (26.9 ft/s).

== Course ==
=== Sections ===
- Esparver
- Salt Del Gall
- Salt Del Tunel
- Circus
- TSD
- Aliga Vella
- Peralt
- Curvone
- Roller's De La Bruna D'Andorra
- Salt Del Tonet

== World Cup ==
=== Men ===
Season	Date	Event	Winner	Second	Third
2018/19	13 March 2019	DH	(Italy) Dominik Paris	(Norway) Kjetil Jansrud	(Austria) Otmar Striedinger
2018/19	14 March 2019	SG	(Italy) Dominik Paris	(Switzerland) Mauro Caviezel	(Austria) Vincent Kriechmayr
2022/23	15 March 2023	DH	(Austria) Vincent Kriechmayr	(Germany) Romed Baumann	(Germany) Andreas Sander
2022/23	16 March 2023	SG	(Switzerland) Marco Odermatt	(Austria) Marco Schwarz	(Norway) A. Aamodt Kilde

=== Women ===
Season	Date	Event	Winner	Second	Third
2015/16	27 February 2016	SG	(Italy) Federica Brignone	(United States) Laurenne Ross	(Austria) Tamara Tippler
2015/16	28 February 2016	AC	(Canada) Marie-Michele Gagnon	(Switzerland) Wendy Holdener	(France) Anne-Sophie Barthet
2018/19	13 March 2019	DH	(Austria) Mirjam Puchner	(Germany) Viktoria Rebensburg	(Switzerland) Corinne Suter
2018/19	14 March 2019	SG	(Germany) Viktoria Rebensburg	(Austria) Tamara Tippler	(Italy) Federica Brignone
2022/23	15 March 2023	DH	(Slovenia) Ilka Štuhec	(Italy) Sofia Goggia	(Switzerland) Lara Gut-Behrami
2022/23	16 March 2023	SG	(Switzerland) Lara Gut-Behrami	(Italy) Federica Brignone	(Norway) Ragnhild Mowinckel
2025/26	27 February 2026	DH	(Switzerland) Corinne Suter	(Austria) Nina Ortlieb	(Italy) Sofia Goggia
2025/26	28 February 2026	DH	rescheduled to 27 February to accommodate rescheduled super-G		
2025/26	28 February 2026	SG	(Germany) Emma Aicher	(New Zealand) Alice Robinson	(Switzerland) Corinne Suter
2025/26	1 March 2026	SG	(Italy) Sofia Goggia	(Germany) Emma Aicher	(Norway) Kajsa Vickhoff Lie

Not in original World Cup calendar. Replacement for Zauchensee (2026).
