= FIS Alpine World Ski Championships 2025 – Women's downhill =

Women's downhill at the FIS Alpine World Ski Championships 2025
- Venue: Skicircus Saalbach-Hinterglemm/Leogang
- Location: Saalbach-Hinterglemm, Austria
- Dates: 8 February
- Competitors: 33 from 16 nations
- Winning time: 1:41.29

Medalists
gold medal	Breezy Johnson	United States
silver medal	Mirjam Puchner	Austria
bronze medal	Ester Ledecká	Czech Republic

Women's Downhill
- Location: Ulli Maier; Saalbach, Austria
- Vertical: 761 m (2,497 ft)
- Top elevation: 1,833 m (6,014 ft)
- Base elevation: 1,072 m (3,517 ft)
- Longest run: 2.940 km (1.83 mi)

The Women's downhill competition at the FIS Alpine World Ski Championships 2025 was held on Saturday, 8 February 2025.

== Results ==
The race was started at 11:30 CET (UTC+1) under sunny skies; the air temperature was 0 °C (32 °F) at the start and finish.

Rank	Bib	Name	Country	Time	Diff
1st place, gold medalist(s)	1	Breezy Johnson	United States	1:41.29	—
2nd place, silver medalist(s)	9	Mirjam Puchner	Austria	1:41.44	+0.15
3rd place, bronze medalist(s)	5	Ester Ledecká	Czech Republic	1:41.50	+0.21
4	7	Cornelia Hütter	Austria	1:41.63	+0.34
5	18	Lauren Macuga	United States	1:41.67	+0.38
6	30	Emma Aicher	Germany	1:41.77	+0.48
7	11	Corinne Suter	Switzerland	1:41.91	+0.62
8	3	Nicol Delago	Italy	1:42.05	+0.76
9	15	Stephanie Venier	Austria	1:42.28	+0.99
10	14	Federica Brignone	Italy	1:42.48	+1.19
11	6	Ilka Štuhec	Slovenia	1:42.60	+1.31
12	2	Kira Weidle-Winkelmann	Germany	1:42.93	+1.64
13	13	Laura Pirovano	Italy	1:42.98	+1.69
14	10	Kajsa Vickhoff Lie	Norway	1:43.06	+1.77
15	21	Lindsey Vonn	United States	1:43.25	+1.96
16	12	Sofia Goggia	Italy	1:43.26	+1.97
17	25	Marte Monsen	Norway	1:43.30	+2.01
17	17	Ariane Rädler	Austria	1:43.30	+2.01
19	20	Malorie Blanc	Switzerland	1:43.49	+2.20
20	4	Laura Gauché	France	1:43.75	+2.46
21	19	Priska Ming-Nufer	Switzerland	1:43.89	+2.60
22	29	Karen Clément	France	1:44.31	+3.02
23	26	Romane Miradoli	France	1:44.67	+3.38
23	28	Elvedina Muzaferija	Bosnia and Herzegovina	1:44.67	+3.38
25	33	Cassidy Gray	Canada	1:44.92	+3.63
26	27	Jordina Caminal	Andorra	1:45.02	+3.73
26	24	Cande Moreno	Andorra	1:45.02	+3.73
28	22	Sabrina Simader	Kenya	1:46.02	+4.73
29	31	Hólmfríður Dóra Friðgeirsdóttir	Iceland	1:47.38	+6.09
30	32	Matilde Schwencke	Chile	1:47.40	+6.11
	8	Lara Gut-Behrami	Switzerland	Did not finish	
	16	Jacqueline Wiles	United States	Did not finish	
	23	Greta Small	Australia	Did not finish	
