= Zauchensee =

Human settlement in Austria

Coordinates: 47°17′37″N 13°27′25″E

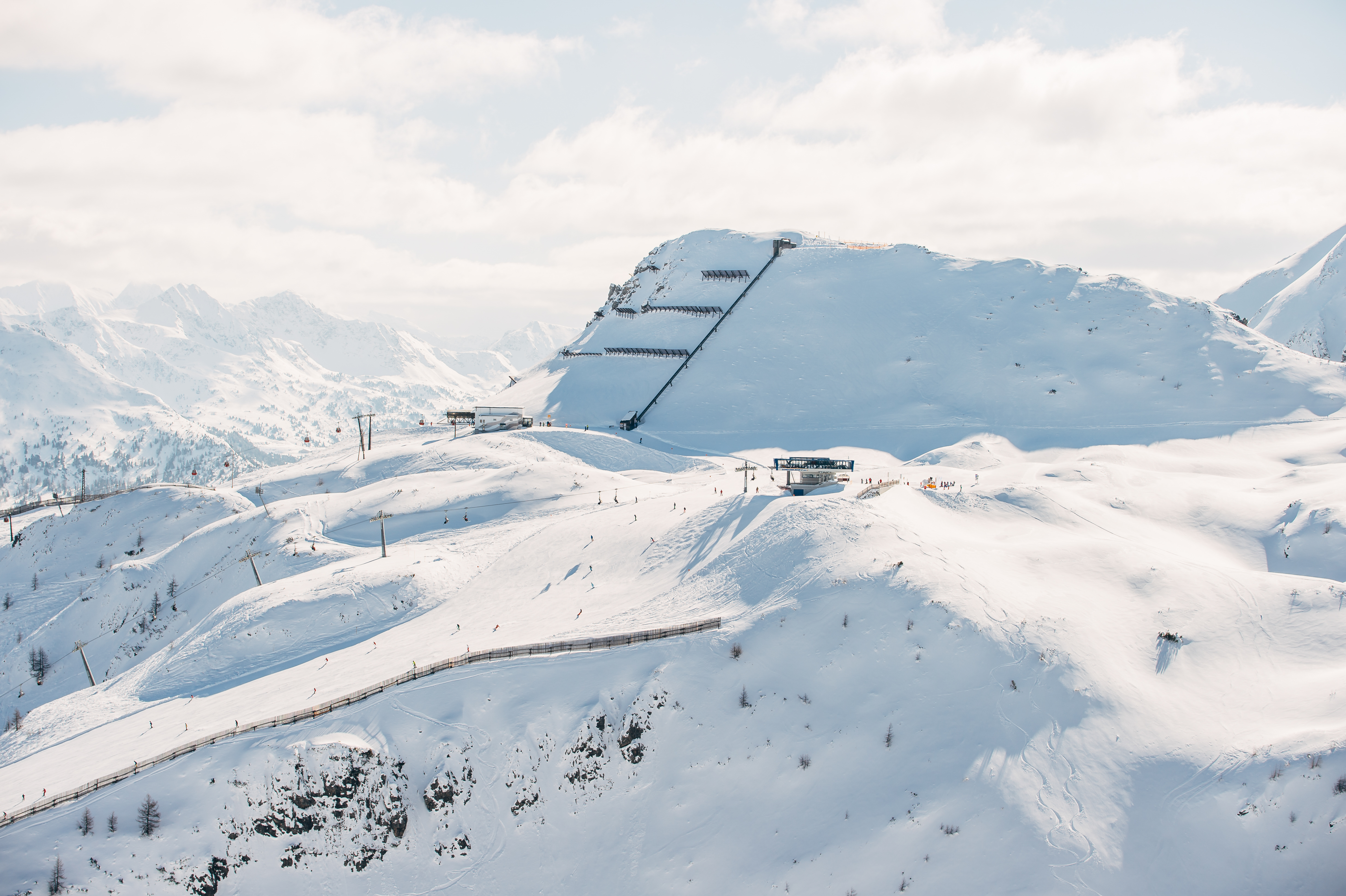
Ski Resort Zauchensee

Zauchensee is a place in the Austrian municipality of Altenmarkt im Pongau, located in the state of Salzburg. Zauchensee is known for its ski resort and as a venue for the Alpine Ski World Cup.

== Location ==
Zauchensee, named after the lake of the same name, is the southernmost part of the municipality of Altenmarkt. It is the heart of the ski resort with hotels and ski lifts. The area is located between 1,339 (lake level) and 2,344 (Steinfeldspitze) metres above sea level.

== History ==
The ski resort was first developed in the 1960s. The lift company was founded in 1964 and the first T-bar began operating in winter 1964/65. The ski resort was then further developed, as were transportation links between Altenmarkt and Zauchensee. The lift company was merged with the one in Radstadt-Altenmarkt in 1989. In 2006, the Seekarsee lake was first used as a reservoir for snowmaking for the ski slopes.

== Sports ==
The Zauchensee-Flachauwinkel-Kleinarl ski resort has 25 lifts and over 70 kilometres of ski slopes for recreational and professional sports.

=== Professional sport ===
- Ski World Cup: several World Cup competitions, the first in 1980 with downhill skiing and super-G slalom. Others in 1980, 1988, 1990, 1994, 1998, 2000, 2004, 2009, 2011, 2014, 2016 and 2017. The 2002 men's and the 2007 women's World Cup finals were held in Zauchensee. From 2020, the Ski World Cup will be held in Zauchensee every two years, alternating with St Anton am Arlberg.
- Freestyle: 1993 World Cup
- FIS competitions
- Europacup

In the 1980s, downhill event competitions were held on Gamskogel-Ost, and the slope has run from the Gamskogel through the Kälberloch since 1990. The first men's competition started at the peak of the Gamskogel in 2002, and the women's started from the very top in 2007. The Kälberloch section is one of the most difficult stretches in the women's World Cup. Prominent victors include Vreni Schneider, Petra Kronberger, Renate Götschl, Michaela Dorfmeister, Julia Mancuso, Lindsey Vonn, Anja Pärson and Sofia Goggia. With the Kids’ Trophy, the resort is also the venue for the largest children's competition in Europe.

=== Recreational sport ===
For recreational sports, the ski resort offers slopes for children and beginners, as well as for advanced skiers and freestylers. In summer, the resort is also suitable for hikers. The Gamskogelbahn I gondola is also open in summer and takes guests to the Gamskogel hut and the ‘Weltcup der Tiere’ adventure play area.
