= Mont Lachaux =

Women's speed ski course in Crans-Montana, Switzerland

- Interactive map of Mont Lachaux
- Location within Switzerland
- 46°19′00″N 7°29′00″E
- Location: Crans-Montana, Switzerland
- Opened: 1987

Downhill
- Start: 2,210 m (7,251 ft) (AA)
- Finish: 1,545 m (5,069 ft)
- Vertical drop: 665 m (2,182 ft)
- Length: 2,451 m (1.52 mi)
- Max incline: 28 degrees (53%)
- Min incline: 5.7 degrees (10%)

Super-G
- Start: 2,130 m (6,988 ft) (AA)
- Finish: 1,560 m (5,118 ft)
- Vertical drop: 570 m (1,870 ft)
- Length: 1,918 m (1.19 mi)

Mont Lachaux is a World Cup women's speed ski course in Crans-Montana, Switzerland, opened in 1987.

They hosted the World Championships in 1987, with Swiss racers Pirmin Zurbriggen, Maria Walliser, Erika Hess, and Peter Müller winning eight of the ten gold medals, dominating in front of the home crowd.

Mont Lachaux is one of three courses of the 1987 World Championships; nearby is "Piste Nationale" men's downhill course and "Chetzeron" is located in Crans village.

== Course ==
=== Sections ===
- La Face
- Le Mur De Marius
- Le Trour de Renard
- La Traversée de Clavan
- Le Toboggan
- Reck de Vermala

== World Championships ==
=== Women's events ===
Event	Type	Date	Gold	Silver	Bronze
1987	KB	(SL) 29 January 1987; 30 January 1987	(Switzerland) Erika Hess	(Austria) Sylvia Eder	(United States) Tamara McKinney
1987	DH	(DH) 1 February 1987	(Switzerland) Maria Walliser	(Switzerland) Michela Figini	(West Germany) Regine Mösenlechner

- The women's World Championships combined slalom was held on "Chetzeron" ski course.

== World Cup ==
=== Women ===
No.	Type	Season	Date	Winner	Second	Third
	DH	2013/14	1 March 2014	fog; replaced in Crans-Montana on 2 March		
1447	DH	2013/14	2 March 2014	(Austria) Andrea Fischbacher	(Austria) Anna Fenninger	(Slovenia) Tina Maze
	SC	2013/14	2 March 2014	cancelled; rescheduled with downhill		
	DH	2015/16	13 February 2016	excessive snow: replaced in La Thuile on 19 February 2016		
	AC	2015/16	14 February 2016	excessive snow forced delay in previous days event		
1512	SL	2015/16	15 February 2016	(United States) Mikaela Shiffrin	(France) Nastasia Noens	(Canada) Marie-Michèle Gagnon
1553	AC	2016/17	24 February 2017	(Italy) Federica Brignone	(Slovenia) Ilka Štuhec	(Austria) Michaela Kirchgasser
1554	SG	2016/17	25 February 2017	(Slovenia) Ilka Štuhec	(Italy) Elena Curtoni	(Austria) Stephanie Venier
1555	AC	2016/17	26 February 2017	(United States) Mikaela Shiffrin	(Italy) Federica Brignone	(Slovenia) Ilka Štuhec
1595	DH	2017/18	3 March 2018	(Liechtenstein) Tina Weirather	(Austria) Anna Veith	(Switzerland) Wendy Holdener
1596	AC	2017/18	4 March 2018	(Italy) Federica Brignone	(Switzerland) Michelle Gisin	(Slovakia) Petra Vlhová
1629	DH	2018/19	23 February 2019	(Italy) Sofia Goggia	(Austria) Nicole Schmidhofer	(Switzerland) Corinne Suter
1630	AC	2018/19	24 February 2019	(Italy) Federica Brignone	(Canada) Roni Remme	(Switzerland) Wendy Holdener
1663	DH	2019/20	21 February 2020	(Switzerland) Lara Gut-Behrami	(Switzerland) Corinne Suter	(Austria) Stephanie Venier
1664	DH	2019/20	22 February 2020	(Switzerland) Lara Gut-Behrami	(Switzerland) Corinne Suter	(Austria) Nina Ortlieb
1665	AC	2019/20	23 February 2020	(Italy) Federica Brignone	(Austria) Franziska Gritsch	(Czech Republic) Ester Ledecká
1683	DH	2020/21	22 January 2021	(Italy) Sofia Goggia	(Czech Republic) Ester Ledecká	(United States) Breezy Johnson
1684	DH	2020/21	23 January 2021	(Italy) Sofia Goggia	(Switzerland) Lara Gut-Behrami	(Italy) Elena Curtoni
1685	SG	2020/21	24 January 2021	(Switzerland) Lara Gut-Behrami	(Austria) Tamara Tippler	(Italy) Federica Brignone
1725	DH	2021/22	26 February 2022	(Czech Republic) Ester Ledecká	(Norway) Ragnhild Mowinckel	(Austria) Cornelia Hütter
1726	DH	2021/22	27 February 2022	(Switzerland) Priska Nufer	(Czech Republic) Ester Ledecká	(Italy) Sofia Goggia
	DH	2022/23	25 February 2023	bad weather; moved to 26 February 2023		
1763	DH	2022/23	26 February 2023	(Italy) Sofia Goggia	(Italy) Federica Brignone	(France) Laura Gauché
	SG	2022/23	26 February 2023	program changes; no replacement		
1801	DH	2023/24	16 February 2024	(Switzerland) Lara Gut-Behrami	(Switzerland) Jasmine Flury (Austria) Cornelia Hütter	
1802	DH	2023/24	17 February 2024	(Italy) Marta Bassino	(Italy) Federica Brignone	(Switzerland) Lara Gut-Behrami
1803	SG	2023/24	18 February 2024	(Austria) Stephanie Venier	(Italy) Federica Brignone	(Italy) Marta Bassino
	DH	2025/26	30 January 2026	cancelled after 6 racers due to three severe crashes and bad visibility		
1870	SG	2025/26	31 January 2026	(Switzerland) Malorie Blanc	(Italy) Sofia Goggia	(United States) Breezy Johnson
