= Ariane Rädler =

Austrian alpine skier (born 1995)

Personal information
- Born: 20 January 1995 (age 31) Bregenz, Vorarlberg, Austria

Skiing career
- Country: Austria
- Sport: Alpine skiing
- Club: SC Möggers
- Disciplines: Downhill, Super-G, Combined
- World Cup debut: 4 February 2018 (age 23)

Olympics
- Teams: 2 – (2022, 2026)
- Medals: 1 (1 gold)

World Championships
- Teams: 2 – (2021, 2025)
- Medals: 0

World Cup
- Seasons: 8 – (2018-2019, 2021–2026)
- Wins: 0
- Podiums: 2 – (2 SG)
- Overall titles: 0 – (23rd in 2026)
- Discipline titles: 0 – (10th in SG, 2025)
Medal record
Women's alpine skiing
Representing Austria
Olympic Games
Gold medal – first place	2026 Milano Cortina	Team combined

Ariane Rädler (born 20 January 1995) is a World Cup alpine ski racer from Austria. Born in Bregenz, Vorarlberg, she specializes in the speed events of downhill and super-G. She won the gold medal as the downhill racer in the team combined event at the 2026 Winter Olympics, with Katharina Huber as her slalom partner.

== World Cup results ==
=== Season standings ===
Season
Season	Age	Overall	Slalom	Giant slalom	Super-G	Downhill	Combined
2019	24	77	—	—	33	42	19
2020	25	did not participate					
2021	26	55	—	—	20	31	—N/a
2022	27	32	—	—	17	23	—N/a
2023	28	72	—	—	42	30	—N/a
2024	29	28	—	—	15	11	—N/a
2025	30	24	—	—	10	15	—N/a
2026	31	23	—	—	16	12	—N/a

=== Race podiums ===
- 0 wins
- 2 podiums – (2 SG); 26 top tens (14 SG, 12 DH)

Season
Season	Date	Location	Discipline	Place
2022	16 January 2022	Altenmarkt-Zauchensee, Austria	Super-G	3rd
2025	15 December 2024	Beaver Creek, United States	Super-G	3rd

== World Championship results ==
Year
Year	Age	Slalom	Giant slalom	Super-G	Downhill	Combined	Team combined
2021	26	—	—	16	—	DNF2	—N/a
2025	30	—	—	21	17	—N/a	—

== Olympic results ==
Year
Year	Age	Slalom	Giant slalom	Super-G	Downhill	Combined	Team combined	Team event
2022	27	—	—	20	—	—	—N/a	—
2026	31	—	—	4	8	—N/a	1	—N/a
