= Asa Ando =

Japanese alpine skier (born 1996)

Personal information
- Native name: 安藤 麻
- Born: 24 April 1996 (age 30) Asahikawa, Japan

Skiing career
- Country: Japan
- Sport: Alpine skiing
- Club: Toyo University
- Disciplines: Slalom, giant slalom
World Cup debut
25 October 2014 (age 18)

Olympics
- Teams: 3 – (2018, 2022, 2026)
- Medals: 0

World Championships
- Teams: 5 – (2017–2025)
- Medals: 0

World Cup
- Seasons: 12 – (2015–2026)
- Podiums: 0
- Overall titles: 0 – (73rd in 2021)
- Discipline titles: 0 – (26th in PAR, 2021)

Asa Ando (安藤 麻, Andō Asa; born 24 April 1996) is a Japanese alpine ski racer who specializes in the technical events of slalom and giant slalom. Ando made her World Cup debut on 25 October 2014.

== Career ==
Ando made her World Cup debut on 25 October 2014 in the Sölden giant slalom, but failed to qualify for the second run, finishing in 32nd place. She competed for Japan at the FIS Alpine World Ski Championships 2017 in St. Moritz, Switzerland. She finished 35th in the giant slalom and failed to finish the first run of the slalom.

== World Cup results ==
=== Season standings ===
Season
Season	Age	Overall	Slalom	Giant slalom	Super-G	Downhill	Combined	Parallel
2018	21	103	46	47	—	—	—	—N/a
2019	22	127	—	53	—	—	—	—N/a
2020	23	81	34	—	—	—	—	28
2021	24	73	35	51	—	—	—N/a	26
2022	25	117	50	—	—	—	—N/a	—
2023	26	99	41	—	—	—	—N/a	—N/a
2024	27	120	54	—	—	—	—N/a	—N/a
2025	28	111	51	—	—	—	—N/a	—N/a
2026	29	86	29	—	—	—	—N/a	—N/a

== World Championship results ==
Year
Year	Age	Slalom	Giant slalom	Super-G	Downhill	Combined	Team combined	Parallel	Team event
2017	20	DNF1	35	—	—	—	—N/a	—N/a	—
2019	22	—	27	—	—	—	—N/a	—N/a	—
2021	24	10	DNF1	—	—	—	—N/a	DNQ	14
2023	26	28	—	—	—	—	—N/a	—	—
2025	28	24	—	—	—	—N/a	—	—N/a	—

== Olympic results ==
Year
Year	Age	Slalom	Giant slalom	Super-G	Downhill	Combined	Team combined
2018	21	DNF1	—	—	—	—	—N/a
2022	25	DNF1	24	—	—	—	—N/a
2026	29	DNF1	—	—	—	—N/a	—
