= Nina O'Brien =

American alpine skier (born 1997)

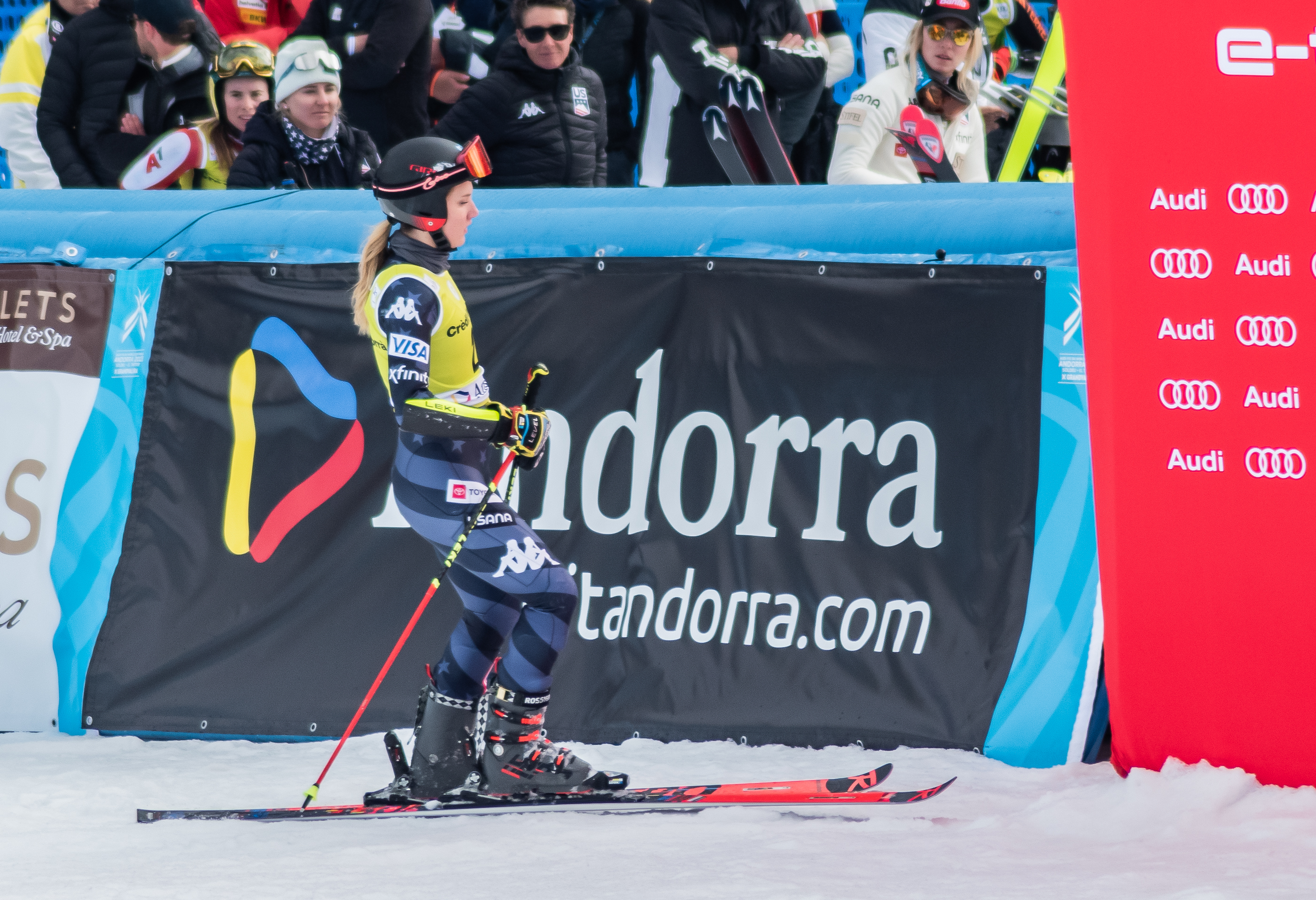
- O'Brien at Soldeu in 2023

Personal information
- Born: November 29, 1997 (age 28) San Francisco, California, U.S.
- Height: 5 ft 7 in (1.70 m)

Skiing career
- Country: United States
- Sport: Alpine skiing
- Club: Burke Mountain Academy
- Disciplines: Giant slalom, Slalom
- World Cup debut: November 26, 2016 (age 18)

Olympics
- Teams: 2 – (2022, 2026)
- Medals: 0

World Championships
- Teams: 4 – (2019–2025)
- Medals: 1 (1 gold)

World Cup
- Seasons: 8 – (2018–2023, 2025–2026)
- Podiums: 0
- Overall titles: 0 – (34th in 2026)
- Discipline titles: 0 – (10th in GS, 2026)
Medal record
Women's alpine skiing
Representing the United States
World Championships
Gold medal – first place	2023 Méribel	Team event

Nina O'Brien (born November 29, 1997) is an American World Cup alpine ski racer and specializes in the technical events of giant slalom and slalom.

O'Brien competed for the United States at the 2022 Winter Olympics, and was in sixth place in the giant slalom after the first run. She crashed near the finish of the second run, suffering multiple leg fractures. O'Brien rehabbed from this devastating injury and returned to competition, teaming up with Paula Moltzan, Tommy Ford, and River Radamus to win gold in the team event at the 2023 World Championships. In her second Olympic experience at the 2026 Milano-Cortina games, she recorded her best finish of 20th in the giant slalom.

== World Cup results ==
=== Season standings ===
Season
Season	Age	Overall	Slalom	Giant slalom	Super-G	Downhill	Combined	Parallel
2019	21	110	52	53	—	—	—	—N/a
2020	22	74	50	37	—	—	—	19
2021	23	43	31	17	—	—	—N/a	—
2022	24	68	42	29	—	—	—N/a	30
2023	25	70	—	26	—	—	—N/a	—N/a
2024	26	did not compete					—N/a	—N/a
2025	27	37	47	11	—	—	—N/a	—N/a
2026	28	34	31	10	—	—	—N/a	—N/a
2027	29	16	—	16	—	—	—N/a	—N/a

Standings through October 26, 2026

=== Top-ten finishes ===
- 0 podiums, 12 top tens (11 GS, 1 SL)

Season
Season	Date	Location	Discipline	Place
2021	December 29, 2020	Semmering, Austria	Slalom	9th
2022	October 23, 2021	Sölden, Austria	Giant slalom	9th
2023	January 25, 2023	Kronplatz, Italy	Giant slalom	10th
2025	October 26, 2024	Sölden, Austria	Giant slalom	7th
2025	November 30, 2024	Killington, United States	Giant slalom	6th
2025	January 21, 2025	Kronplatz, Italy	Giant slalom	10th
2025	February 21, 2025	Sestriere, Italy	Giant slalom	8th
2026	October 25, 2025	Sölden, Austria	Giant slalom	6th
2026	December 6, 2025	Tremblant, Canada	Giant slalom	10th
2026	January 3, 2026	Kranjska Gora, Slovenia	Giant slalom	8th
2026	January 24, 2026	Špindlerův Mlýn, Czech Republic	Giant slalom	5th
2026	March 25, 2026	Hafjell, Norway	Giant slalom	8th

== World Championship results ==
Year
Year	Age	Slalom	Giant slalom	Super-G	Downhill	Combined	Team combined	Parallel	Team event
2019	21	34	28	—	—	—	—N/a	—N/a	—
2021	23	DNF2	10	—	—	—	—N/a	10	6
2023	25	DNF1	11	—	—	—	—N/a	9	1
2025	27	—	19	—	—	—N/a	—	—N/a	4

== Olympic results ==
Year
Year	Age	Slalom	Giant slalom	Super-G	Downhill	Combined	Team combined	Team event
2022	24	—	DSQ2	—	—	—	—N/a	—
2026	28	DNF1	20	—	—	—N/a	DNF1-DNS	—N/a
