= 2024–25 FIS Alpine Ski Europa Cup =

Alpine skiing competition

Discipline	Men	Women
Overall	(Norway) Oscar Andreas Sandvik	(Austria) Nadine Fest
Downhill	(Switzerland) Livio Hiltbrand	(Austria) Nadine Fest
Super-G	(Austria) Vincent Wieser	(Austria) Nadine Fest
Giant slalom	(Switzerland) Lenz Hächler	(Austria) Nina Astner
Slalom	(Norway) Oscar Andreas Sandvik	(France) Marion Chevrier

Competition
Edition	54th	54th
Locations	19	17
Individual	36	36
Cancelled	1	4
Rescheduled	6	0

The 2024–25 FIS Alpine Ski Europa Cup, organised by the International Ski Federation (FIS) is the 54th consecutive Europa Cup season, the second international level competition in alpine skiing.

The season started on 23 November 2024 in Levi, Finland, and will conclude on 23 March 2025 in Oppdal, Norway.

== Men ==
=== Calendar ===
Stage	Date	Place	Discipline	Winner	Second	Third	Ref.
1	23 November 2024	(Finland) Levi	Slalom	(Italy) Tommaso Saccardi	(Norway) Mikkel Remsøy	(Austria) Simon Rueland	
2	24 November 2024	(Finland) Levi	Slalom	(Norway) Oscar Andreas Sandvik	(Switzerland) Matthias Iten	(Norway) Mikkel Remsøy	
3	5 December 2024	(Switzerland) Zinal	Giant slalom	(Switzerland) Lenz Hächler	(France) Flavio Vitale	(Spain) Aleix Aubert Serracanta	
4	(Note: First run held December 5)5-6 December 2024	(Switzerland) Zinal	Giant slalom	(Switzerland) Lenz Hächler	(France) Flavio Vitale	(France) Alban Elezi Cannaferina	
5	11 December 2024	(Italy) Santa Caterina	Downhill	(Austria) Felix Hacker	(Slovenia) Nejc Naraločnik	(Italy) Nicolò Molteni	
6	12 December 2024	(Italy) Santa Caterina	Downhill	(Austria) Felix Hacker	(Italy) Max Perathoner	(Switzerland) Livio Hiltbrand	
7	13 December 2024	(Italy) Santa Caterina	Super-G	(Austria) Vincent Wieser	(Austria) Felix Hacker	(Italy) Benjamin Jacques Alliod	
8	15 December 2024	(Italy) Val di Fassa	Slalom	(Sweden) Gustav Wissting	(Finland) Jesper Pohjolainen (Norway) Oscar Andreas Sandvik	–	
9	16 December 2024	(Italy) Obereggen	Slalom	(France) Antoine Azzolin	(Finland) Jesper Pohjolainen	(Norway) Oscar Andreas Sandvik	
	19 December 2024	(France) Valloire	Giant slalom	cancelled, moved to Berchtesgaden on 19-21 December			
	20 December 2024	(France) Valloire	Giant slalom	cancelled, moved to Berchtesgaden on 19-21 December			
	(Note: Men's cancelled giant slalom from Valloire was rescheduled to Berchtesgaden on 19 December 2024.)19 December 2024	(Germany) Berchtesgaden	Giant slalom	cancelled, moved to Ål on 11-12 March			
	(Note: Men's cancelled giant slalom from Valloire was rescheduled to Berchtesgaden on 20 December 2024 and later 21 December 2024.)21 December 2024	(Germany) Berchtesgaden	Giant slalom	cancelled, moved to Ål on 11-12 March			
	10 January 2025	(Switzerland) Wengen	Super-G	cancelled, moved to Pass Thurn on 13 January			
	11 January 2025	(Switzerland) Wengen	Super-G	cancelled, moved to Crans-Montana on 10 February			
10	(Note: Men's cancelled super-G from Wengen was rescheduled to Pass Thurn on 13 January 2025.)13 January 2025	(Austria) Pass Thurn	Super-G	(Canada) Raphaël Lessard	(Austria) Felix Hacker	(Italy) Emanuele Buzzi (Austria) Vincent Wieser	
11	16 January 2025	(Austria) Pass Thurn	Downhill	(Switzerland) Alessio Miggiano	(Switzerland) Gaël Zulauf	(Italy) Max Perathoner	
12	17 January 2025	(Austria) Pass Thurn	Downhill	(Austria) Felix Hacker	(Austria) Vincent Wieser	(Switzerland) Gaël Zulauf	
13	19 January 2025	(Germany) Berchtesgaden	Slalom	(Italy) Matteo Canins	(Italy) Corrado Barbera	(France) Auguste Aulnette	
14	20 January 2025	(Austria) Reiteralm	Super-G	(Austria) Felix Hacker	(Italy) Marco Abbruzzese	(France) Alban Elezi Cannaferina	
15	21 January 2025	(Austria) Reiteralm	Super-G	(France) Alban Elezi Cannaferina	(Norway) Rasmus Windingstad	(Switzerland) Eric Wyler	
16	24 January 2025	(Austria) Turnau	Giant slalom	(Lithuania) Andrej Drukarov	(Germany) Anton Grammel	(Norway) Rasmus Bakkevig (Italy) Simon Talacci	
17	25 January 2025	(Austria) Turnau	Giant slalom	(Norway) Rasmus Bakkevig	(Sweden) Mattias Rönngren	(France) Guerlain Favre	
18	30 January 2025	(France) Orcières-Merlette	Downhill	(Austria) Matteo Haas	(Slovenia) Rok Ažnoh	(Switzerland) Philipp Kälin	
19	31 January 2025	(France) Orcières-Merlette	Downhill	(Switzerland) Livio Hiltbrand	(France) Ken Caillot	(Switzerland) Gaël Zulauf	
20	1 February 2025	(France) Orcières-Merlette	Super-G	(Germany) Maximilian Schwarz	(Switzerland) Christophe Torrent	(Slovenia) Rok Ažnoh	
21	3 February 2025	(Andorra) Soldeu	Giant slalom	(Norway) Eirik Hystad Solberg	(Sweden) Mattias Rönngren	(France) Loévan Parand	
22	4 February 2025	(Andorra) Soldeu	Giant slalom	(Norway) Eirik Hystad Solberg	(France) Alban Elezi Cannaferina	(Sweden) Mattias Rönngren	
23	6 February 2025	(Spain) Baqueira-Beret	Slalom	(Austria) Simon Rueland	(Italy) Matteo Canins	(Norway) Oscar Andreas Sandvik	
24	7 February 2025	(Spain) Baqueira-Beret	Slalom	(Norway) Oscar Andreas Sandvik	(Austria) Oscar Heine	(Austria) Simon Rueland	
25	(Note: Men's cancelled super-G from Wengen was rescheduled to Crans-Montana on 10 February 2025.)10 February 2025	(Switzerland) Crans-Montana	Super-G	(Austria) Manuel Traninger	(Austria) Andreas Ploier	(Switzerland) Marco Kohler	
26	12 February 2025	(Switzerland) Crans-Montana	Downhill	(Switzerland) Livio Hiltbrand	(Switzerland) Sandro Manser	(Switzerland) Gaël Zulauf	
27	(Note: Rescheduled from 13 February 2025)12 February 2025	(Switzerland) Crans-Montana	Downhill	(Switzerland) Christophe Torrent	(Italy) Nicolò Molteni	(Switzerland) Marco Kohler	
28	21 February 2025	(Bosnia and Herzegovina) Bjelašnica	Super-G	(Austria) Andreas Ploier	(Austria) Luis Tritscher	(Switzerland) Lenz Hächler	
29	22 February 2025	(Bosnia and Herzegovina) Bjelašnica	Super-G	(Italy) Marco Abbruzzese	(Switzerland) Lenz Hächler	(Austria) Andreas Ploier	
30	(Note: Men's cancelled super-G from Berchtesgaden was rescheduled to Ål on 12 March 2025.)12 March 2025	(Norway) Ål	Giant Slalom	(France) Alban Elezi Cannaferina	(Switzerland) Lenz Hächler	(France) Flavio Vitale	
31	(Note: Men's cancelled super-G from Berchtesgaden was rescheduled to Ål on 13 March 2025.)13 March 2025	(Norway) Ål	Giant Slalom	(Switzerland) Lenz Hächler	(Norway) Oscar Andreas Sandvik	(France) Alban Elezi Cannaferina	
	16 March 2025	(Norway) Kvitfjell	Downhill	cancelled			
32	17 March 2025	(Norway) Kvitfjell	Super-G	(Switzerland) Lenz Hächler	(Austria) Stefan Rieser	(Austria) Vincent Wieser	
33	19 March 2025	(Norway) Norefjell	Slalom	(Austria) Simon Rueland	(Norway) Theodor Brækken	(Sweden) Fabian Ax Swartz	
34	20 March 2025	(Norway) Norefjell	Slalom	(Norway) Hans Grahl-Madsen	(Norway) Oscar Andreas Sandvik	(Norway) Theodor Brækken	
35	22 March 2025	(Norway) Oppdal	Giant slalom	(Norway) Oscar Andreas Sandvik	(Switzerland) Lenz Hächler	(Norway) Rasmus Bakkevig	
36	23 March 2025	(Norway) Oppdal	Slalom	(Austria) Simon Rueland	(Norway) Oscar Andreas Sandvik	(Sweden) William Hansson	

=== Rankings ===
==== Overall ====
Rank	after all 36 events	Points
1	(Norway) Oscar Andreas Sandvik	968
2	(Switzerland) Lenz Hächler	895
3	(France) Alban Elezi Cannaferina	718
4	(Austria) Felix Hacker	610
5	(Switzerland) Alessio Miggiano	533

==== Downhill ====
Rank	after all 8 events	Points
1	(Switzerland) Livio Hiltbrand	366
2	(Switzerland) Alessio Miggiano	357
3	(Austria) Felix Hacker	350
4	(Switzerland) Gaël Zulauf	349
5	(Switzerland) Christophe Torrent	304

==== Super-G ====
Rank	after all 9 events	Points
1	(Austria) Vincent Wieser	364
2	(Italy) Marco Abbruzzese	353
3	(Austria) Andreas Ploier	347
4	(France) Alban Elezi Cannaferina	300
5	(Switzerland) Lenz Hächler	290

==== Giant slalom ====
Rank	after all 9 events	Points
1	(Switzerland) Lenz Hächler	485
2	(Norway) Eirik Hystad Solberg	329
3	(Norway) Oscar Andreas Sandvik	325
4	(France) Alban Elezi Cannaferina	323
5	(France) Guerlain Favre	261

==== Slalom ====
Rank	after all 10 events	Points
1	(Norway) Oscar Andreas Sandvik	589
2	(Austria) Simon Rueland	494
3	(Finland) Jesper Pohjolainen	335
4	(France) Antoine Azzolin	325
5	(Norway) Hans Grahl-Madsen	317

== Women ==
=== Calendar ===
Stage	Date	Place	Discipline	Winner	Second	Third	Ref.
1	2 December 2024	(Switzerland) Zinal	Giant slalom	(Austria) Viktoria Bürgler	(France) June Brand	(Switzerland) Janine Schmitt	
2	3 December 2024	(Switzerland) Zinal	Giant slalom	(Switzerland) Delphine Darbellay	(Germany) Jana Fritz	(France) Lois Abouly	
3	7 December 2024	(Austria) Mayrhofen / Hippach	Giant slalom	(Austria) Victoria Olivier	(Switzerland) Vanessa Kasper	(Austria) Katharina Truppe	
	8 December 2024	(Austria) Mayrhofen / Hippach	Slalom	cancelled			
4	13 December 2024	(Switzerland) St. Moritz	Downhill	(Austria) Nadine Fest	(Austria) Carmen Spielberger	(Switzerland) Janine Schmitt	
5	(Note: Originally scheduled to December 14)13 December 2024	(Switzerland) St. Moritz	Downhill	(Austria) Carmen Spielberger	(Austria) Nadine Fest	(Switzerland) Janine Schmitt	
6	16 December 2024	(Switzerland) Zinal	Super-G	(Italy) Asja Zenere	(Switzerland) Janine Schmitt	(Canada) Valérie Grenier	
7	17 December 2024	(Switzerland) Zinal	Super-G	(Switzerland) Malorie Blanc	(Italy) Asja Zenere	(Italy) Sara Allemand	
8	19 December 2024	(Italy) Ahrntal	Slalom	(Italy) Marta Rossetti	(France) Marion Chevrier	(Liechtenstein) Charlotte Lingg	
9	20 December 2024	(Italy) Ahrntal	Slalom	(Sweden) Estelle Alphand	(France) Marion Chevrier	(Switzerland) Anuk Brändli	
10	7 January 2025	(Switzerland) Les Diablerets	Slalom	(France) Doriane Escané	(Switzerland) Aline Danioth	(France) Caitlin McFarlane	
11	8 January 2025	(Switzerland) Les Diablerets	Slalom	(Austria) Lisa Hörhager	(Switzerland) Anuk Brändli	(Sweden) Moa Landström	
12	10 January 2025	(France) Puy-Saint-Vincent	Giant slalom	(Austria) Nina Astner	(Canada) Britt Richardson	(Finland) Erika Pykäläinen	
13	11 January 2025	(France) Puy-Saint-Vincent	Giant slalom	(Switzerland) Vanessa Kasper	(Austria) Nina Astner	(Germany) Fabiana Dorigo	
14	15 January 2025	(Austria) Zauchensee	Downhill	(Austria) Nadine Fest	(Austria) Carmen Spielberger	(Austria) Leonie Zegg	
15	16 January 2025	(Austria) Zauchensee	Downhill	(Austria) Nadine Fest	(Austria) Victoria Olivier	(Austria) Carmen Spielberger	
16	17 January 2025	(Austria) Zauchensee	Super-G	(Austria) Nadine Fest	(Italy) Sara Allemand	(France) Clara Direz	
17	19 January 2025	(Austria) Zell am See	Slalom	(Switzerland) Eliane Christen	(Liechtenstein) Charlotte Lingg	(Switzerland) Aline Höpli	
18	20 January 2025	(Austria) Zell am See	Slalom	(France) Marion Chevrier	(Switzerland) Eliane Christen	(Switzerland) Aline Danioth	
	29 January 2025	(Italy) Sella Nevea (Note: The event was initially scheduled to be held in Tarvisio, but ended up being moved to Sella Nevea.)	Downhill	cancelled			
	30 January 2025	(Italy) Sella Nevea	Downhill	cancelled			
19	3 February 2025	(Czech Republic) Špindlerův Mlýn	Slalom	(France) Marion Chevrier	(Czech Republic) Martina Dubovská	(Italy) Marta Rossetti	
20	4 February 2025	(Czech Republic) Špindlerův Mlýn	Slalom	(France) Marion Chevrier	(Switzerland) Aline Höpli	(Czech Republic) Martina Dubovská	
21	9 February 2025	(Germany) Oberjoch	Giant slalom	(Austria) Nina Astner	(Switzerland) Selina Egloff	(Germany) Fabiana Dorigo	
22	10 February 2025	(Germany) Oberjoch	Giant slalom	(Liechtenstein) Charlotte Lingg	(Italy) Sophie Mathiou	(Sweden) Hilma Lövblom	
23	14 February 2025	(Italy) Bardonecchia	Super-G	(Italy) Asja Zenere	(Switzerland) Janine Schmitt	(Switzerland) Stefanie Grob	
24	(Note: Rescheduled from 13 February 2025)15 February 2025	(Italy) Bardonecchia	Super-G	(Austria) Nadine Fest	(Switzerland) Stefanie Grob	(Italy) Sara Allemand	
25	19 February 2025	(Italy) Sarntal	Super-G	(United States) Breezy Johnson	(Austria) Nadine Fest	(United States) Isabella Wright	
26	20 February 2025	(Italy) Sarntal	Super-G	(Austria) Nadine Fest	(Austria) Victoria Olivier	(United States) Breezy Johnson	
27	8 March 2025	(Austria) Kitzbühel	Super-G	(Austria) Nadine Fest	(Austria) Carmen Spielberger	(Austria) Victoria Olivier	
28	9 March 2025	(Austria) Kitzbühel	Super-G	(Austria) Magdalena Egger	(Austria) Victoria Olivier	(Austria) Nadine Fest	
	16 March 2025	(Norway) Kvitfjell	Downhill	cancelled			
29	17 March 2025	(Norway) Kvitfjell	Super-G	(Bosnia and Herzegovina) Elvedina Muzaferija	(Italy) Sara Thaler	(Austria) Magdalena Egger	
30	19 March 2025	(Norway) Geilo (Note: The event was initially scheduled to be held in Ål, but ended up being moved to Geilo.)	Giant slalom	(Italy) Lara Della Mea	(Sweden) Hilma Lövblom	(Sweden) Lisa Nyberg	
31	20 March 2025	(Norway) Geilo	Giant slalom	(Sweden) Hilma Lövblom	(Sweden) Lisa Nyberg	(France) Clara Direz	
32	22 March 2025	(Norway) Oppdal	Giant slalom	(Italy) Lara Della Mea	(Germany) Fabiana Dorigo	(Switzerland) Vanessa Kasper	
33	23 March 2025	(Norway) Oppdal	Slalom	(Switzerland) Aline Danioth	(Austria) Lisa Hörhager	(Switzerland) Selina Egloff	

=== Rankings ===
==== Overall ====
Rank	after all 33 events	Points
1	(Austria) Nadine Fest	985
2	(Austria) Victoria Olivier	870
3	(Switzerland) Janine Schmitt	653
4	(France) Marion Chevrier	639
5	(Austria) Carmen Spielberger	589

==== Downhill ====
Rank	after all 4 events	Points
1	(Austria) Nadine Fest	380
2	(Austria) Carmen Spielberger	320
3	(Austria) Victoria Olivier	215
4	(Austria) Leonie Zegg	136
4	(Italy) Sara Allemand	136

==== Super-G ====
Rank	after all 10 events	Points
1	(Austria) Nadine Fest	605
2	(Switzerland) Stefanie Grob	405
3	(Italy) Sara Allemand	352
4	(Switzerland) Janine Schmitt	346
5	(Austria) Magdalena Egger	338

==== Giant slalom ====
Rank	after all 10 events	Points
1	(Austria) Nina Astner	408
2	(Switzerland) Vanessa Kasper	372
3	(Sweden) Hilma Lövblom	362
4	(Austria) Victoria Olivier	317
5	(Switzerland) Selina Egloff	315

==== Slalom ====
Rank	after all 9 events	Points
1	(France) Marion Chevrier	626
2	(Switzerland) Eliane Christen	424
3	(Switzerland) Aline Danioth	343
4	(Austria) Lisa Hörhager	259
5	(Switzerland) Anuk Brändli	255

== Podium table by nation ==
Table showing the Europa Cup podium places (gold–1st place, silver–2nd place, bronze–3rd place) by the countries represented by the athletes.

Rank	Nation	Gold	Silver	Bronze	Total
1	Austria	25	17	11	53
2	Switzerland	13	16	18	47
3	Italy	8	9	8	25
4	France	7	7	11	25
5	Norway	7	7	6	20
6	Sweden	3	4	6	13
7	Germany	1	3	2	6
8	Canada	1	1	1	3
8	Liechtenstein	1	1	1	3
10	United States	1	0	2	3
11	Bosnia and Herzegovina	1	0	0	1
11	Lithuania	1	0	0	1
13	Finland	0	2	1	3
13	Slovenia	0	2	1	3
15	Czech Republic	0	1	1	2
16	Spain	0	0	1	1
Totals (16 entries)		69	70	70	209
