= Thea Louise Stjernesund =

Norwegian alpine skier (born 1996)

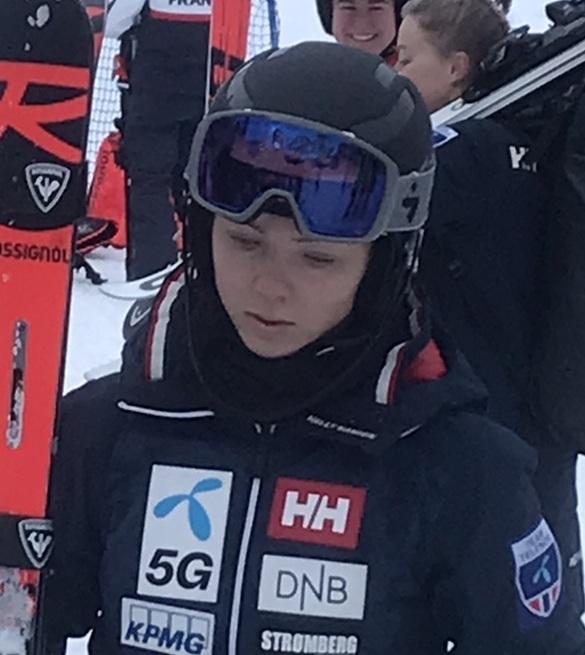
- Stjernesund in 2023

Personal information
- Full name: Thea Louise Stjernesund
- Born: 24 November 1996 (age 29) Lørenskog, Norway
- Height: 1.76 m (5 ft 9 in)

Skiing career
- Country: Norway
- Sport: Alpine skiing
- Club: Hakadal IL
- Disciplines: Slalom, Giant slalom
- World Cup debut: 27 October 2018 (age 21)

Olympics
- Teams: 2 – (2022, 2026)
- Medals: 2 (0 gold)

World Championships
- Teams: 4 – (2019, 2021, 2023, 2025)
- Medals: 3 (1 gold)

World Cup
- Seasons: 8 – (2019–2026)
- Wins: 0
- Podiums: 5 – (4 GS, 1 PG)
- Overall titles: 0 – (20th in 2023 and 2025)
- Discipline titles: 0 – (4th in GS, 2025)
Medal record
Women's alpine skiing
Representing Norway
Olympic Games
Silver medal – second place	2026 Milano Cortina	Giant slalom
Bronze medal – third place	2022 Beijing	Team event
World Championships
Gold medal – first place	2021 Cortina d’Ampezzo	Team event
Silver medal – second place	2023 Méribel	Team event
Bronze medal – third place	2023 Méribel	Parallel

Thea Louise Stjernesund (born 24 November 1996) is a Norwegian World Cup alpine ski racer and specializes in the technical events of slalom and giant slalom.

== Career ==
Competing at the 2016 and 2017 Junior World Championships, her best individual result was eighth in giant slalom, but she also won a mixed team bronze medal in 2016.

Stjernesund made her World Cup debut in October 2018 in the season opener at Sölden, and collected her first points with a ninth-place finish. Her second-best result during the season was twelfth place in Andorra in March. She was eighteenth in the giant slalom and fifth in the team event at the World Championships in February.

She represents the sports club Hakadal IL.

== World Cup results ==
=== Season standings ===
Season
Season	Age	Overall	Slalom	Giant slalom	Super-G	Downhill	Combined	Parallel
2019	22	49	52	13	—	—	—	—N/a
2020	23	44	27	24	—	—	—	14
2021	24	54	26	—	—	—	—N/a	6
2022	25	35	27	17	—	—	—N/a	2nd place, silver medalist(s)
2023	26	20	14	10	—	—	—N/a	—N/a
2024	27	25	33	7	—	—	—N/a	—N/a
2025	28	20	43	4	—	—	—N/a	—N/a
2026	29	31	39	8	—	—	—N/a	—N/a

=== Race podiums ===
- 0 wins
- 5 podiums – (4 GS, 1 PG), 34 top tens

Season
Season	Date	Location	Discipline	Place
2022	13 November 2021	Lech/Zürs, Austria	Parallel-G	2nd
2023	19 March 2023	Soldeu, Andorra	Giant slalom	2nd
2024	17 March 2024	Saalbach, Austria	Giant slalom	3rd
2025	21 February 2025	Sestriere, Italy	Giant slalom	3rd
2026	29 November 2025	Copper Mountain, United States	Giant slalom	3rd

== World Championship results ==
Year
Year	Age	Slalom	Giant slalom	Super-G	Downhill	Combined	Team combined	Parallel	Team event
2019	22	—	18	—	—	—	—N/a	—N/a	5
2021	24	22	DNS2	—	—	—	—N/a	DNQ	1
2023	26	13	8	—	—	—	—N/a	3	2
2025	28	DNF1	4	—	—	—N/a	—	—N/a	7

== Olympic results ==
Year
Year	Age	Slalom	Giant slalom	Super-G	Downhill	Combined	Team combined	Team event
2022	25	15	6	—	—	—	—N/a	3
2026	29	DNF1	2	—	—	—N/a	—	—N/a
