= Vanessa Kasper =

Swiss alpine skier (born 1996)

Personal information
- Full name: Vanessa Marina Kasper
- Born: 8 December 1996 (age 29) Celerina, Graubünden, Switzerland
- Height: 167 cm (5 ft 6 in)
- Website: vanessakasper.ch

Skiing career
- Country: Switzerland
- Sport: Alpine skiing
- Club: Alpina St.Moritz
- Disciplines: Giant slalom
- World Cup debut: 10 December 2016 (age 20)

Olympics
- Teams: 1 – (2026)
- Medals: 0

World Championships
- Teams: 0

World Cup
- Seasons: 8 – (2017–2018, 2020–2023, 2025–2026)
- Podiums: 0
- Overall titles: 0 – (59th in 2026)
- Discipline titles: 0 – (14th in PAR, 2022)

Vanessa Marina Kasper (born 8 December 1996) is a Swiss World Cup alpine ski racer who specializes in giant slalom. She competed for Switzerland at the 2026 Winter Olympics.

== Early life ==
Kasper was raised in Celerina, Graubünden, and attended the sports high school in Davos, one of the main sports-study programs for Swiss skiers. Her father, Curdin Kasper, was the coach of the Swiss national cross-country ski team, and runs a school for the sport in Celerina.

== Career ==
Kasper began competing in FIS-level races in November 2011 at age 15 and participated in the 2013 European Youth Olympic Winter Festival held in Romania. She debuted at the continental level during the 2013–14 season with starts on the Nor-Am Cup in November and on the Europa Cup in January.

She earned her first points on the Europa Cup during the 2015–16 season, and went on to gain points in 11 Cup races that winter, including her first podium. She was also part of the Swiss delegation at the 2016 Junior World Championships in Sochi, Russia, where her best finish was a 10th place in the giant slalom.

Kasper's World Cup debut came on 10 December 2016 in the giant slalom at Sestriere, Italy, and she had two more starts on the top circuit that month, but was unable to earn a second run in any of them. On the Europa Cup that winter, she continued to consistently earn points, but had only one top-ten result. She finished off the season with her second trip to the Junior World Championships, this time in Åre, Sweden.

Kasper broke through to the top of the podium at a Europa Cup event for the first time in December 2017, and earned her first World Cup points that same month. In January, however, she had a serious crash during the first run of the World Cup giant slalom in Lenzerheide, Switzerland, breaking her tibia and fibula and forcing her to miss the remainder of the season. She was able to recover in time to make two European Cup starts the next season, but needed additional surgery and did not race again that winter.

Kasper opened the 2019–20 season with six races in Australia and New Zealand, achieving top-five finishes in all but one. On the Europa Cup she was only able to earn points in two of her seven starts, and she was also out of the points in her lone World Cup event. The next year saw some improvement with points in eight Europa Cup races (including a sixth place) and also in the single World Cup event she entered.

Her 2021–22 season was split between the Europa and World Cups, with nine starts on each. On the lower circuit she finished among the top 15 in eight of those starts, while on the top tour she only gained points in two races, although one of those was a new-career-best 14th in the parallel giant slalom in Lech/Zürs, Austria.

The winter of 2022–23 was again split between Europa and World Cup events. She once more earned points consistently on the Europa Cup, but the World Cup was less successful, with no top 30 finishes in her 9 starts.

Kasper was back on the Europa Cup full time for 2023–24, with no World Cup starts that winter. She gained points in all but one of her giant slalom starts and finished the season by winning the Swiss National Championship in that discipline.

The 2024–25 season was her best yet on the Europa Cup. Kasper finished on the podium three times (including one win) and ended up second in the season standings for giant slalom. On the World Cup she gained points in three of seven starts. In April she successfully defended her title as the Swiss National Champion in giant slalom.

Kasper competed in all eight of the giant slaloms prior to the Olympics during the 2025–26 World Cup season. She earned points in seven of those events with two results in the top fifteen on 20 and 24 January. The two top-fifteen finishes meant she had met the selection criteria to be included in the Swiss team for the 2026 Winter Olympics just before the 26 January deadline. In her Olympic debut, she finished 23rd in the giant slalom. Kasper qualified for her first World Cup Finals with a 16th-place finish in Åre that ensured her placement in the top 25 of the giant slalom season standings. At the Finals in Hafjell, Norway, Kasper secured her first World Cup top ten to finish 20th in the final season standings.

== World Cup results ==
=== Season standings ===
Season
Season	Age	Overall	Slalom	Giant slalom	Super-G	Downhill	Combined	Parallel
2018	21	126	—	52	—	—	—	—N/a
2019	22	did not compete						—N/a
2020	23	no World Cup points earned						
2021	24	112	—	49	—	—	—N/a	—
2022	25	100	—	50	—	—	—N/a	14
2023	26	no World Cup points earned					—N/a	—N/a
2024	27	did not compete					—N/a	—N/a
2025	28	97	—	39	—	—	—N/a	—N/a
2026	29	59	—	20	—	—	—N/a	—N/a

=== Top-ten finishes ===
- 0 podiums; 1 top ten

Season
Season	Date	Location	Discipline	Place
2026	25 March 2026	Hafjell, Norway	Giant slalom	10th

== Olympic results ==
Year
Year	Age	Slalom	Giant slalom	Super-G	Downhill	Team combined
2026	29	—	23	—	—	—
