= Nina Astner =

Austrian alpine skier (born 2000)

Personal information
- Born: 24 July 2000 (age 26) Wattens, Austria

Skiing career
- Country: Austria
- Sport: Alpine skiing
- Club: USC Itter
- Disciplines: Giant slalom, slalom
- World Cup debut: 21 December 2022 (age 22)

Olympics
- Teams: 1 – (2026)
- Medals: 0

World Cup
- Seasons: 5 – (2022–2026)
- Podiums: 0
- Overall titles: 0 – (67th in 2026)
- Discipline titles: 0 – (24th in GS, 2026)

Nina Astner (born 24 July 2000) is an Austrian alpine ski racer. She specializes in the technical disciplines of giant slalom and slalom.

== Career ==
Astner is from Tyrol in Austria. She began competing in FIS races in 2016.

In the 2024–2025 season, Astner won two events in the giant slalom in the Europa Cup.

Astner placed 18th in the giant slalom at the 2026 Winter Olympics in February 2026.

== World Cup results ==
=== Season standings ===
Season
Season	Age	Overall	Slalom	Giant slalom	Super-G	Downhill
2023	22	115	—	45	—	—
2024	23	no World Cup points earned				
2025	24	no World Cup points earned				
2026	25	67	—	24	—	—

=== Top-twenty finishes ===
- 0 podiums; 4 top twenties

Season
Season	Date	Location	Discipline	Place
2026	6 December 2025	Tremblant, Canada	Giant slalom	18th
2026	27 December 2025	Semmering, Austria	Giant slalom	12th
2026	20 January 2026	Kronplatz, Italy	Giant slalom	16th
2026	24 January 2026	Špindlerův Mlýn, Czech Republic	Giant slalom	13th

== Olympic results ==
Year
Year	Age	Slalom	Giant slalom	Super-G	Downhill	Team combined
2026	25	—	18	—	—	—
