= Janine Schmitt =

Swiss alpine skier (born 2000)

Personal information
- Born: 26 October 2000 (age 25) Vilters-Wangs, Switzerland

Skiing career
- Country: Switzerland
- Sport: Alpine skiing
- Club: Graue Hoerner Mels
- Disciplines: Downhill, Super-G
- World Cup debut: 20 January 2023 (age 22)

Olympics
- Teams: 1 – (2026)
- Medals: 0

World Championships
- Teams: 0

World Cup
- Seasons: 4 – (2023–2026)
- Podiums: 0
- Overall titles: 0 – (64th in 2026)
- Discipline titles: 0 – (24th in DH, 2026)

Janine Schmitt (born 26 October 2000) is a Swiss alpine skier. She represented Switzerland at the 2026 Winter Olympics.

== Career ==
During the 2023–24 FIS Alpine Ski Europa Cup, Schmitt was the overall and super-G winner. She become the only athlete, male or female, to win multiple Europa Cup crystal medals this season.

During the 2025–26 FIS Alpine Ski World Cup on 10 January 2026, she finished in fifth place, 0.17 seconds off the podium. This was her best World Cup result after never finishing inside the top 15 previously. In January 2026, she was selected to represent Switzerland at the 2026 Winter Olympics.

== World Cup results ==
=== Season standings ===
Season
Season	Age	Overall	Slalom	Giant slalom	Super-G	Downhill
2023	22	115	—	—	—	45
2024	23	no World Cup points earned				
2025	24	82	—	—	38	34
2026	25	64	—	—	35	24

=== Top-ten finishes ===
- 0 podiums, 1 top ten

Season
Season	Date	Location	Discipline	Place
2026	10 January 2026	Zauchensee, Austria	Downhill	5th

== Olympic results ==
Year
Year	Age	Slalom	Giant slalom	Super-G	Downhill	Team combined
2026	25	—	—	DNF	17	DNF2
