= 2025 Alpine Skiing World Cup – Women's overall =

Alpine ski discipline year standings

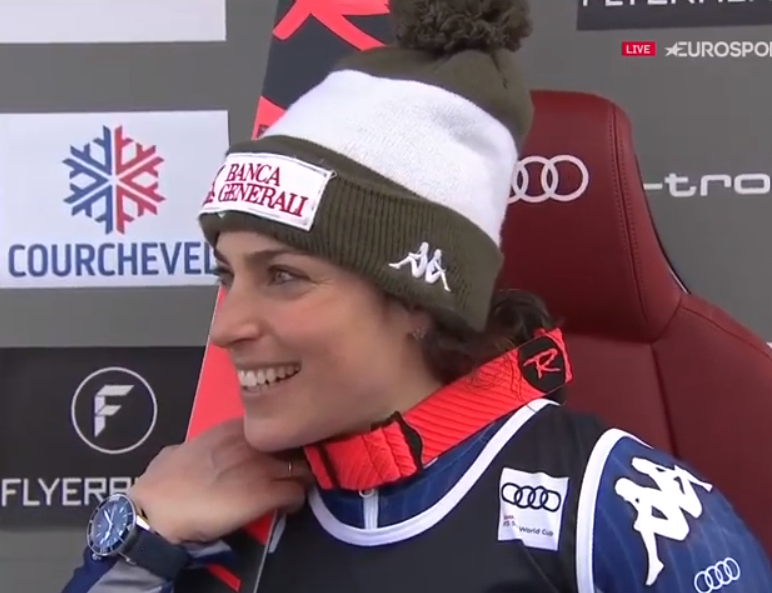
2025 Women's Overall World Cup: Federica Brignone of Italy, season champion for the second time; 2025 Women's World Cup; Overall • Downhill • Super-G; Giant slalom • Slalom
Previous: 2024	Next: 2026

The women's overall competition in the 2025 FIS Alpine Skiing World Cup consisted of 34 events in four disciplines: downhill (DH) (6 races), super-G (SG) (9 races), giant slalom (GS) (9 races), and slalom (SL) (10 races). The original schedule called for 8 downhills and 10 giant slaloms, but two downhills (including the one at finals) and a giant slalom were cancelled during the season, reducing the women's season from 37 to 34 races.

After total cancellations in each of the prior two seasons, the two downhills scheduled on the Matterhorn in mid-November were removed from the schedule. Also, for the third straight season, only the four major disciplines will be contested on the World Cup circuit.

The season shaped up as a repeat of the 2024 season: after a serious early injury to Mikaela Shiffrin of the United States while leading the overall championship, the season race eventually became a two-person battle between three-event skiers Lara Gut-Behrami of Switzerland, last season's champion, and Federica Brignone of Italy, last season's runner-up. This year, though, the advantage went to Brignone, who wrapped up the overall championship by winning the last race before finals (her 10th win of the season: 2 downhills, 3 super-Gs, and 5 giant slaloms). In so doing, Brignone (at 34) became the oldest woman ever to win a World Cup race in each of those disciplines and (with her second overall title) the oldest women's overall champion in history.

As is the case every odd year, the FIS Alpine World Ski Championships 2025 was held, this time in Saalbach, Austria during 4–16 February 2025. Gold medals at the worlds were won by Breezy Johnson of the United States in the downhill, Stephanie Venier of Austria in the super-G, Federica Brignone of Italy in the giant slalom, Camille Rast of Switzerland in the slalom. Johnson (DH) and Mikaela Shiffrin (SL) of the United States in the team combined, and Italy (including Giorgia Collomb and Lara Della Mea) in the mixed-team parallel, while the only woman to win three medals was Wendy Holdener of Switzerland with three silvers (slalom, team combined, and mixed-team parallel).

== Season summary ==
=== The early season ===
The first race of the season, a giant slalom scheduled as usual on the Rettenbach glacier in Sölden, Austria in October, was won by 2020 overall champion Federica Brignone of Italy, who rallied from third place after the opening run with the seventh-fastest time in the second run to overtake both of the racers ahead of her. With the victory, Brignone, who is 34, became the oldest woman ever to win a World Cup race. Because this race was held so early in the fall, neither 2016 and 2024 overall champion Lara Gut-Behrami of Switzerland nor 2021 overall champion Petra Vlhová of Slovakia had recovered from prior surgeries sufficiently to be able to compete, although Gut-Behrami entered the race but did not start. Three weeks later, picking up where she left off, five-time (2017–19, 2022–23) overall champion Mikaela Shiffrin of the United States won the slalom in Levi, Finland, giving her the season lead and an all-time record 98 total victories in World Cup skiing. After the race, Shiffrin stated that "from this weekend, I am racing every single weekend until world championships, for sure. So it’s going be a really big push now." Shiffrin then won her 99th career victory in another slalom the following week in Gurgl, Austria.

In the very next race, at Shiffrin's "home" course in Killington, Vermont, US, Shiffrin made her first try for her 100th World Cup victory. As in the prior giant slalom in Sölden, she held the lead going into the second run. However, while still in the lead shortly after the midpoint of the course, she suffered a hard crash into the fencing, which resulted in her being stretchered off the course; the crash handed the win to Sara Hector of Sweden. Shiffrin's injury was eventually diagnosed as an abdominal puncture wound (which could not be stitched up due to the possibility of infection) combined with "severe muscle trauma", and she was anticipated to miss at least the next two weeks.

In the first race without Shiffrin, Camille Rast of Switzerland, who had posted her first two World Cup podiums ever by placing third in the prior two races, rallied from third after the second leg to post her first World Cup victory and take the lead in the overall standing for the season. In an injury update, Shiffrin posted on 9 December (over a week after the accident) that she was finally able to walk outside her house, making it appear that her return to competition might not take place in December. Shortly thereafter, Shiffrin had to undergo abdominal surgery to clean out the wound, keeping her completely away from the rest of the North American swing of the World Cup (even as a spectator) and delaying her return to competition still further.

However, Shiffrin was not the only female American multiple-time champion making news. Around the same time, 40-year-old four-time World Cup overall champion Lindsey Vonn of the United States, Shiffrin's former teammate (and the third-winningest skier in World Cup history, with 82 total race victories) who retired during the 2019 season due to injuries and has since had a complete knee replacement, announced the end of her retirement and then qualified for a possible return to the World Cup circuit. And Vonn served as a forerunner for the first-ever women's competitive run on the Birds of Prey course at Beaver Creek, Colorado (USA), the first speed race of the women's season, which was won by defending downhill discipline champion Cornelia Hütter of Austria. After the race, Vonn said she would return to competition the next week in St. Moritz. And the last race of the North America swing, which was also the first super-G of the season, was won by another athlete making an injury comeback: Sofia Goggia of Italy; the win, coupled with a second the day before, moved Goggia into sixth position for the season.

=== Mid-season ===
Vonn did indeed return when the races moved back to Europe, and she placed 14th in her first race back. The first super-G at St. Moritz was won by Hütter, followed by Gut-Behrami and Goggia, moving Hütter into overall second and both Goggia and Gut-Behrami into the overall top five. The second super-G was canceled due to strong winds and poor visibility. After the Christmas break, the next giant slalom, held after Christmas in Semmering (AUT), came down to a second-run battle between Brignone and Gut-Behrami, which was decided when Gut-Behrami hooked a gate with her arm, handing the victory and the overall season lead to Brignone. The next three races were all technical events: two slaloms and a giant slalom. The two slaloms, which bracketed New Year's Day, were both won by 20-year-old rising star Zrinka Ljutić of Croatia, propelling her into the overall season lead (as well as the lead in the slalom discipline). In between, Hector was able to win the giant slalom and reclaim the season lead in that discipline.

The following two speed races in St. Anton, Austria featured Brignone returning to the overall lead with a victory in the downhill (her first-ever in the discipline, breaking Vonn's record as the oldest downhill winner) and a third in the super-G, which was won by Vonn's 22-year-old American teammate Lauren Macuga for her first World Cup triumph. Vonn's finishes (6th in the downhill, 4th in the super-G) also continued to attract media attention for the U.S. team, while another story was the success of the "new wave" of skiers, including Croatia's Ljutić, the U.S.'s Macuga, Albania's Lara Colturi (18), and Swiss newcomer Malorie Blanc (18), who finished second in the St. Anton downhill in her second-ever World Cup race. Another slalom two days later in Flachau (Austria) caused the overall lead to change hands again, when Camille Rast charged from eighth after the first run to post her second World Cup victory and seize the overall lead for the season, with Hector also moving ahead of Brignone. But Brignone immediately regained the overall lead by finished third in the next race, a downhill at Cortina d'Ampezzo, Italy, with her countrywoman Goggia triumphing. Brignone then kept the Italian winning streak alive in speed races by winning the next two, a super-G at Cortina and a downhill at Garmisch-Partenkirchen, Germany (by 1/100 of a second over Goggia), enabling her to open up a double-digit point lead over Gut-Behrami. But between them, Alice Robinson of New Zealand won a giant slalom held at Kronplatz, Italy, in a race where Hector, Brignone and Goggia failed to finish, and edged out Hector by four points for the season lead in that discipline. And in the final race at Garmisch, Gut-Behrami won the super-G for her 46th career World Cup victory, placing her fifth all-time among women, behind only Shiffrin, Vonn, Annemarie Moser-Pröll, and Vreni Schneider and closing her deficit to Brignone in the overall standings down to 70 points.

At long last, Shiffrin announced her upcoming return at the slalom in Courcheval, France on 30 January, a full nine weeks after her injury and less than a week before the start of the world championships. At Courcheval, Ljutić posted her third slalom victory of the season, making her the first woman other than Schiffrin or Vhlová to win three slaloms in one season since Marlies Schild of Austria in 2012.

=== Late season: the rise of Brignone, while Shiffrin reaches 100 ===
After the worlds, in the first of two GS races in Sestriere, Italy, Brignone, who was sick with the flu since worlds, repeated her success and prevailed by four-tenths of a second, with Gut-Behrami failing to finish. The next day, Brignone dominated again, winning her fourth GS of the season to move into second in the discipline, just 40 points behind Robinson with only two races remaining, while expanding her lead over Gut-Behrami (who finished second) to 180 points with only 12 events remaining. In the slalom, after more time to recover and build strength, Shiffrin turned a slight lead over Ljutić after the first run into a wide victory on the second run, giving her a third victory for the season -- and an all-time record 100 World Cup victories in Alpine skiing overall, as well as tying the all-time record of 155 World Cup podium finishes that had been set by Sweden's Ingemar Stenmark almost 40 years ago.

The next three races (2 DH and an SG) took place at Kvitfjell, Norway, and all were decided by hundredths of a second. In the first downhill, Hütter recovered from failing to podium before her home fans at Saalbach and won her second downhill of the season, edging out (by .05 seconds) Germany's Emma Aicher, a 21-year-old all-events skier reaching her first World Cup podium ever. In the second, Aicher edged out Macuga (combined age: 43) by .03 seconds for her first World Cup win, while Brignone's two finishes just off the podium extended her overall season advantage over Gut-Behrami to 231 points. Finally, in the super-G, Brignone nipped Gut-Behrami by .06 seconds for the win, which increased her lead over Gut-Behrami to 251 with just seven non-slaloms remaining (since neither currently competes in slalom). The next events were technical races in Åre, Sweden: the giant slalom was once again won by Brignone, with Robinson again second, decreasing Robinson's lead in the discipline to just 20 points with only the finals remaining. In the slalom, 29-year-old Katharina Truppe of Austria recorded her first World Cup victory in come-from-behind fashion, while first-run leader Shiffrin held on for third and thus broke the all-time World Cup podium record.

Finally, the regular season came down to three speed races at La Thuile, Italy, near Brignone's hometown, but the first race -- the downhill -- was cancelled when heavy snowfall prevented either of the training runs from been completed. The two giant slaloms went forward, though, with Germany's Aicher winning the first for her second World Cup victory, with Brignone third and Gut-Behrami fourth. The second race was another Brignone victory, her 10th of the season, with Gut-Behrami finishing fourth again. At the end of the race, Brignone had a 384-point lead over Gut-Behrami with just four races remaining -- but, since Gut-Behrami no longer skis slalom because of past injuries, the maximum number of points that Gut-Behrami could make up is only 300, meaning that Brignone's overall victory was assured.

== Finals ==
The finals in all disciplines were held from 22 to 27 March 2025 in Sun Valley, Idaho, US. Only the top 25 skiers in each World Cup discipline and the winner of the Junior World Championship in the discipline, plus any skiers who have scored at least 500 points in the World Cup overall classification for the season, were eligible to compete in the finals, and only the top 15 finishers earned World Cup points.

In the first scheduled final, downhill, a combination of fresh snow in the morning and high winds in the evening forced the finals to be cancelled, thus handing the discipline crown to the current leader Brignone. But the next day, though, the bad weather had moved out, and Gut-Behrami blew away the field in the super-G, winning the race by over a second to win the discipline championship for a record sixth time (2014, 2016, 2021, 2023-25), with 40-year-old Vonn (capturing her first World Cup podium in over seven years, since 15 March 2018, making her the oldest woman ever to podium in a World Cup race) in second and a disappointed Brignone in third. In the giant slalom, Gut-Behrami won again, but Brignone's second place was sufficient to give her the discipline championship over Robinson, who failed to finish. However, Gut-Behrami's win made her the first woman to achieve a "triple-double" of World Cup victories: 10 giant slalom wins to go with 24 super-Gs and 13 downhills (plus one combined, for a total of 48); the only men to accomplish it are Hermann Maier (1998-2009) (15 DH, 24 SG, 14 GS) and Pirmin Zurbriggen (1982-1990) (10 DH, 10 SG, 11 K). In the slalom, the last race at finals, Shiffrin, now much further along in her recovery and in front of a supportive home crowd (including a number of girls dressed as Dalmatians, because Shiffrin was seeking victory number 101) blew out the field by over a second for her fourth win of the season; meanwhile, Ljutić hung on for her very first discipline championship at 20.

=== After finals ===
Once finals and the World Cup season were over, many of the World Cup skiers competed in national championships as the final event of the Alpine season. One of those skiers was Brignone, who was a huge draw in her home country as the only Italian woman ever to win the overall women's championship, which she had just done for the second time. However, during the second run of the giant slalom on Alpe Lucia in Trentino during 3 April 2025, Brignone crashed, fracturing her left leg tibia in multiple places, also breaking the fibular head, and rupturing the ACL. After surgery on 8 April, both her doctors and Italian ski officials stated that it was impossible to know whether Brignone would be able to defend her World Cup titles during the 2026 season or even whether she would be able to compete in the 2026 Winter Olympics, which are being hosted in her home region of Milan in February.

== Standings ==
#	Skier	DH; 6 races	SG; 9 races	GS; 9 races	SL; 10 races	Total
	(Italy) Federica Brignone	384	630	580	0	1,594
2	(Switzerland) Lara Gut-Behrami	229	665	378	0	1,272
3	(Italy) Sofia Goggia	350	466	115	0	931
4	(Croatia) Zrinka Ljutić	0	0	275	541	816
5	(Sweden) Sara Hector	0	0	447	305	752
6	(Switzerland) Camille Rast	0	0	244	492	736
7	(New Zealand) Alice Robinson	4	176	520	0	700
8	(Albania) Lara Colturi	0	0	379	276	655
9	(Austria) Cornelia Hütter	368	251	0	0	619
10	(Switzerland) Wendy Holdener	0	0	143	469	612
11	(Austria) Katharina Liensberger	0	0	54	509	563
12	(United States) Paula Moltzan	0	0	286	263	549
13	(Germany) Lena Dürr	0	0	75	473	548
14	(Norway) Kajsa Vickhoff Lie	168	317	62	0	547
15	(United States) Mikaela Shiffrin	0	0	51	486	537
16	(Germany) Emma Aicher	180	194	19	133	526
17	(United States) Lauren Macuga	230	279	16	0	525
18	(Switzerland) Corinne Suter	178	248	0	0	426
19	(Italy) Laura Pirovano	209	195	0	0	404
20	(Norway) Thea Louise Stjernesund	0	0	381	17	398
21	(Czech Republic) Ester Ledecká	183	191	0	0	374
22	(Italy) Marta Bassino	71	218	69	0	358
23	(Sweden) Anna Swenn-Larsson	0	0	0	347	347
24	(Austria) Ariane Rädler	106	233	0	0	339
25	(Italy) Elena Curtoni	46	284	0	0	330
26	(Switzerland) Mélanie Meillard	0	0	0	310	310
27	(Austria) Stephanie Venier	97	212	0	0	309
28	(Norway) Mina Fürst Holtmann	0	0	127	164	291
29	(United States) Lindsey Vonn	86	203	0	0	289
30	(France) Romane Miradoli	36	241	0	0	277
31	(Austria) Julia Scheib	0	5	260	0	265
32	(Slovenia) Andreja Slokar	0	0	0	260	260
33	(Slovenia) Neja Dvornik	0	0	164	95	259
34	(Canada) Valérie Grenier	10	56	174	0	240
35	(Austria) Ricarda Haaser	53	102	84	0	239
36	(Austria) Katharina Truppe	0	0	0	234	234
37	(United States) Nina O'Brien	0	0	220	11	231
38	(Germany) Kira Weidle-Winkelmann	91	134	0	0	225
39	(United States) Breezy Johnson	189	24	0	0	213
40	(Switzerland) Michelle Gisin	66	96	20	30	212
41	(Austria) Mirjam Puchner	107	104	0	0	211
42	(Slovenia) Ilka Štuhec	134	72	0	0	206
43	(United States) AJ Hurt	0	0	152	44	196
44	(Austria) Katharina Huber	0	0	0	189	189
45	(Switzerland) Malorie Blanc	89	70	0	0	159
46	(Sweden) Cornelia Öhlund	0	0	0	156	156
47	(Sweden) Estelle Alphand	0	0	110	32	142
48	(Slovenia) Ana Bucik Jogan	0	0	82	47	129
49	(United States) Jacqueline Wiles	112	12	0	0	124
	(France) Laura Gauché	55	69	0	0	124
51	(Italy) Roberta Melesi	13	102	7	0	122
52	(Canada) Laurence St. Germain	0	0	0	121	121
53	(United States) Katie Hensien	0	0	97	22	119
	(Austria) Christina Ager	54	65	0	0	119
	(Poland) Maryna Gąsienica-Daniel	0	6	113	0	119
56	(Austria) Stephanie Brunner	0	4	108	0	112
57	(Canada) Britt Richardson	0	0	102	0	102
58	(France) Marie Lamure	0	0	0	100	100
59	(Sweden) Hanna Aronsson Elfman	0	0	0	94	94
60	(Italy) Lara Della Mea	0	0	41	52	93
61	(Norway) Marte Monsen	75	12	0	0	87
62	(Canada) Ali Nullmeyer	0	0	0	86	86
63	(Italy) Martina Peterlini	0	0	0	84	84
64	(France) Clarisse Brèche	0	0	15	65	80
65	(Switzerland) Joana Hählen	1	72	0	0	73
	(Italy) Nicol Delago	57	16	0	0	73
67	(Italy) Asja Zenere	0	22	48	0	70
68	(Austria) Franziska Gritsch	0	0	25	42	67
69	(United States) Keely Cashman	3	62	0	0	65
70	(Austria) Nadine Fest	19	45	0	0	64
71	(France) Karen Clément	4	57	0	0	61
72	(Switzerland) Priska Ming-Nufer	50	8	0	0	58
73	(Sweden) Lisa Nyberg	0	0	57	0	57
74	(Italy) Nadia Delago	54	1	0	0	55
75	(Austria) Nina Ortlieb	45	2	0	0	47
	(Italy) Marta Rosetti	0	0	0	47	47
77	(Switzerland) Delia Durrer	36	10	0	0	46
78	(Italy) Giorgia Collomb	0	0	30	15	45
79	(Switzerland) Eliane Christen	0	0	0	44	44
	(Austria) Magdalena Egger	24	20	0	0	44
81	(Austria) Katharina Gallhuber	0	0	0	41	41
82	(Switzerland) Janine Schmitt	20	19	0	0	39
83	(France) Camille Cerutti	0	37	0	0	37
84	(Switzerland) Jasmina Suter	15	21	0	0	36
	(Czech Republic) Martina Dubovská	0	0	0	36	36
86	(Switzerland) Aline Höpli	0	0	0	34	34
	(United States) Elisabeth Bocock	0	0	34	0	34
88	(Canada) Amelia Smart	0	0	0	32	32
89	(Bosnia and Herzegovina) Elvedina Muzaferija	6	23	0	0	29
90	(France) Chiara Pogneaux	0	0	0	28	28
91	(Croatia) Leona Popović	0	0	0	26	26
	(France) Marion Chevrier	0	0	0	26	26
	(Norway) Madeleine Sylvester-Davik	0	0	26	0	26
	(Italy) Ilaria Ghisalberti	0	0	26	0	26
95	(France) Clara Direz	0	0	25	0	25
96	(Austria) Lisa Hörhager	0	0	0	24	24
97	(Switzerland) Vanessa Kasper	0	0	20	0	20
	(Germany) Jessica Hilzinger	0	0	0	20	20
99	(Switzerland) Simone Wild	0	0	19	0	19
100	(Switzerland) Janine Mächler	0	0	0	15	15
101	(Norway) Kristin Lysdahl	0	0	14	0	14
102	(Switzerland) Elena Stoffel	0	0	0	13	13
	(United States) Tricia Mangan	0	13	0	0	13
104	(Canada) Cassidy Gray	0	0	11	0	11
105	(Latvia) Dženifera Ģērmane	0	0	0	10	10
	(Italy) Beatrice Sola	0	0	0	10	10
107	(France) Caitlin McFarlane	0	0	0	9	9
	(Italy) Vicky Bernardi	2	7	0	0	9
109	(United States) Isabella Wright	8	0	0	0	8
110	(Germany) Fabiana Dorigo	0	0	7	0	7
111	(Sweden) Hilma Lövblom	0	0	6	0	6
	(Japan) Asa Ando	0	0	0	6	6
113	(Poland) Magdalena Luczak	0	0	5	0	5
	(France) Doriane Escané	0	0	5	0	5
115	(Austria) Lisa Grill	0	4	0	0	4
	(Switzerland) Aline Danioth	0	0	0	4	4
	(Italy) Emilia Mondinelli	0	0	0	4	4
118	(Austria) Victoria Olivier	0	0	2	0	2
119	(United States) Haley Cutler	1	0	0	0	1
	(Italy) Sara Thaler	1	0	0	0	1
	(Argentina) Francesca Baruzzi Farriol	0	0	1	0	1

- Leader
- 2nd place
- 3rd place
- does not compete in this discipline
- Updated on 25 March 2025, after all events.

== See also ==
- 2025 Alpine Skiing World Cup – Women's summary rankings
- 2025 Alpine Skiing World Cup – Women's downhill
- 2025 Alpine Skiing World Cup – Women's super-G
- 2025 Alpine Skiing World Cup – Women's giant slalom
- 2025 Alpine Skiing World Cup – Women's slalom
- 2025 Alpine Skiing World Cup – Men's overall
- World Cup scoring system
