= Eliane Christen =

Swiss alpine skier (born 1999)

Personal information
- Born: 19 January 1999 (age 27) Hospental, Switzerland
- Height: 162 cm (5 ft 4 in)
- Website: elainechristen.ch

Skiing career
- Country: Switzerland
- Sport: Alpine skiing
- Club: SC Gotthard Andermatt
- Disciplines: Slalom
- World Cup debut: 21 December 2023 (age 24)

Olympics
- Teams: 1 – (2026)
- Medals: 0

World Championships
- Teams: 1 – (2025)
- Medals: 0

World Cup
- Seasons: 3 – (2024–2026)
- Podiums: 0
- Overall titles: 0 – (56th in 2026)
- Discipline titles: 0 – (19th in SL, 2026)

Eliane Christen (born 19 January 1999) is a Swiss World Cup alpine ski racer and specializes in slalom. She represented Switzerland at the 2026 Winter Olympics.

== Early life and education ==
Christen grew up in the Uri canton and studied agriculture at ETH Zurich.

== Career ==
Christen broke her collarbone in 2017 and fractured her left tibia and fibula in 2019, leading to a two-year hiatus from her skiing career. She returned to skiing in 2020.

In 2025, she finished second in the slalom season standings of the European Cup.

At the 2026 Winter Olympics in Italy, Christen competed in the slalom and team combined events at Cortina d'Ampezzo.

== World Cup results ==
=== Season standings ===
Season
Season	Age	Overall	Slalom	Giant slalom	Super-G	Downhill
2025	26	79	28	—	—	—
2026	27	56	19	—	—	—

=== Top-ten results ===
- 0 podiums, 2 top tens (2 SL)

Season
Season	Date	Location	Discipline	Place
2026	28 December 2025	Semmering, Austria	Slalom	9th
2026	13 January 2026	Flachau, Austria	Slalom	9th

== World Championship results ==
Year
Year	Age	Slalom	Giant slalom	Super-G	Downhill	Team combined	Team event
2025	26	DNF1	—	—	—	12	—

== Olympic results ==
Year
Year	Age	Slalom	Giant slalom	Super-G	Downhill	Team combined
2026	27	DNF2	—	—	—	DNF2
