= Katharina Gallhuber =

Austrian alpine skier (born 1997)

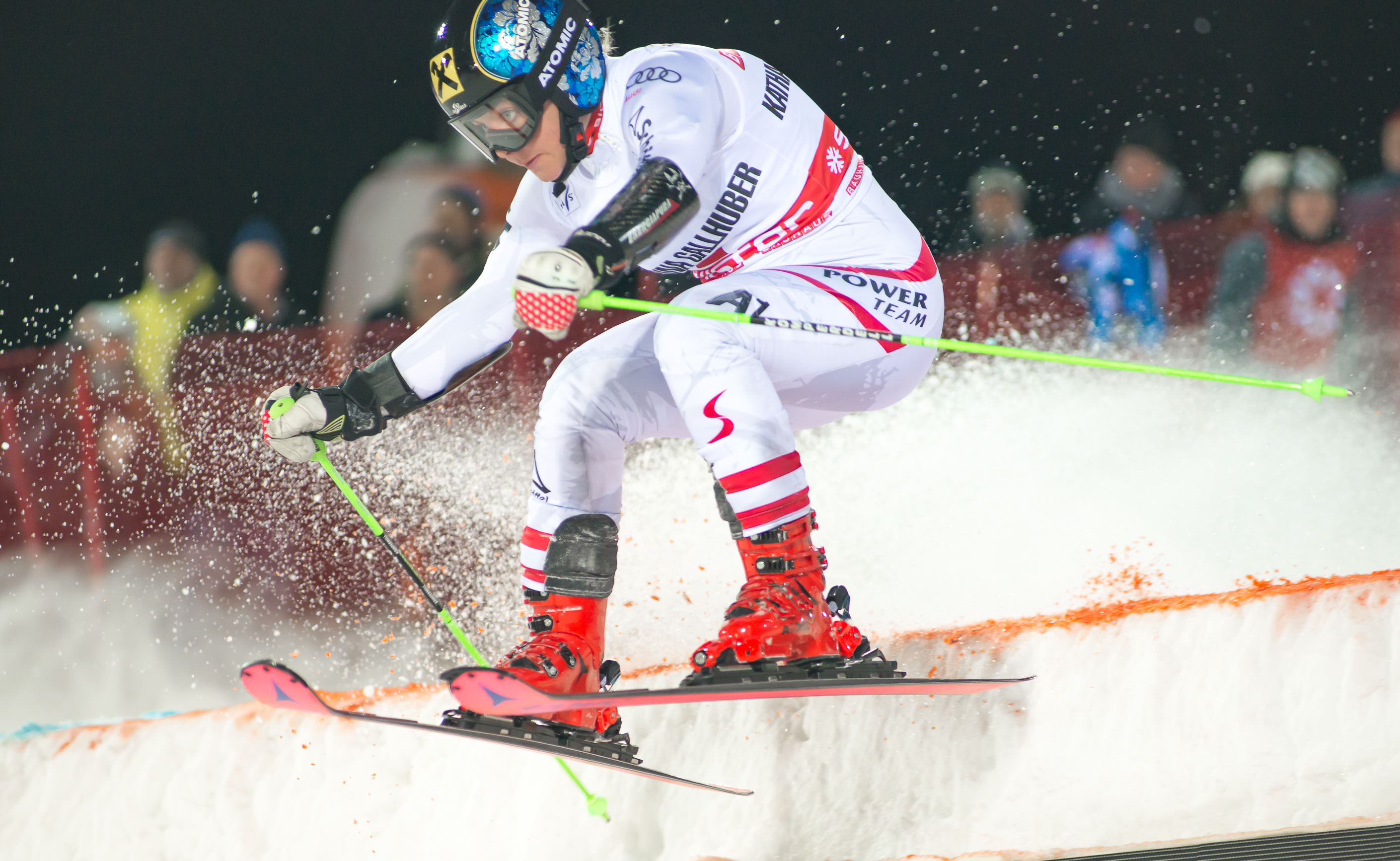
- At Hammarbybacken in 2018

Personal information
- Born: 16 June 1997 (age 29) Scheibbs, Lower Austria, Austria

Skiing career
- Country: Austria
- Sport: Alpine skiing
- Club: SC Goestling-Hochkar
- Disciplines: Slalom, giant slalom

Olympics
- Teams: 3 – (2018, 2022, 2026)
- Medals: 2 (0 gold)

World Championships
- Teams: 2 – (2017, 2025)
- Medals: 0

World Cup
- Seasons: 10 – (2016–2022, 2024–2026)
- Podiums: 0
- Overall titles: 0 – (26th in 2018)
- Discipline titles: 0 – (7th in SL, 2018)
Medal record
Women's alpine skiing
Representing Austria
International alpine ski competitions
Event	1st	2nd	3rd
Olympic Games	0	1	1
World Championships	0	0	0
Total	0	1	1
Olympic Games
Silver medal – second place	2018 Pyeongchang	Team event
Bronze medal – third place	2018 Pyeongchang	Slalom
Junior World Championships
Silver medal – second place	2016 Sochi	Slalom

Katharina Gallhuber (born 16 June 1997) is an Austrian World Cup alpine ski racer who specializes in slalom. She won a bronze medal in the slalom and a silver in the mixed team event at the PyeongChang 2018 Olympics.

== World Cup results ==
=== Season standings ===
Season
Season	Age	Overall	Slalom	Giant slalom	Super-G	Downhill	Combined	Parallel
2016	18	86	33	—	—	—	—	—N/a
2017	19	86	32	—	—	—	—	—N/a
2018	20	26	7	—	—	—	—	—N/a
2019	21	61	23	—	—	—	—	—N/a
2020	22	68	19	—	—	—	—	—
2021	23	49	17	—	—	—	—N/a	—
2022	24	56	18	—	—	—	—N/a	—
2023	25	—	—	—	—	—	—N/a	—N/a
2024	26	53	17	—	—	—	—N/a	—N/a
2025	27	81	31	—	—	—	—N/a	—N/a
2026	28	57	21	—	—	—	—N/a	—N/a

=== Top-ten results ===
- 0 podiums, 18 top tens

Season
Season	Date	Location	Discipline	Place
2018	16 November 2017	Killington, United States	Slalom	7th
2018	28 December 2017	Lienz, Austria	Slalom	7th
2018	3 January 2018	Zagreb, Croatia	Slalom	6th
2018	9 January 2018	Flachau, Austria	Slalom	10th
2018	28 January 2018	Lenzerheide, Switzerland	Slalom	7th
2018	30 January 2018	Stockholm, Sweden	Parallel-S	5th
2018	10 March 2018	Ofterschwang, Germany	Slalom	5th
2018	17 March 2018	Åre, Sweden	Slalom	7th
2019	17 November 2018	Levi, Finland	Slalom	7th
2019	25 November 2018	Killington, United States	Slalom	8th
2019	9 December 2019	St. Moritz, Switzerland	Parallel-S	9th
2020	1 December 2019	Killington, United States	Slalom	8th
2021	13 March 2021	Åre, Sweden	Slalom	9th
2022	29 December 2021	Lienz, Austria	Slalom	6th
2022	4 January 2022	Zagreb, Croatia	Slalom	6th
2022	9 January 2022	Kranjska Gora, Slovenia	Slalom	8th
2024	21 December 2023	Courchevel, France	Slalom	4th
2024	29 December 2023	Lienz, Austria	Slalom	7th

== World Championship results ==
Year
Year	Age	Slalom	Giant; Slalom	Super-G	Downhill	Combined	Team combined
2017	19	DNF2	—	—	—	—	—N/a
2025	27	DNF1	—	—	—	—N/a	21

== Olympic results ==
Year
Year	Age	Slalom	Giant slalom	Super-G	Downhill	Combined	Team combined	Team event
2018	20	3	—	—	—	—	—N/a	2
2022	24	14	—	—	—	—	—N/a	—
2026	28	22	—	—	—	—N/a	7	—N/a
