= Marion Chevrier =

French alpine skier (born 2001)

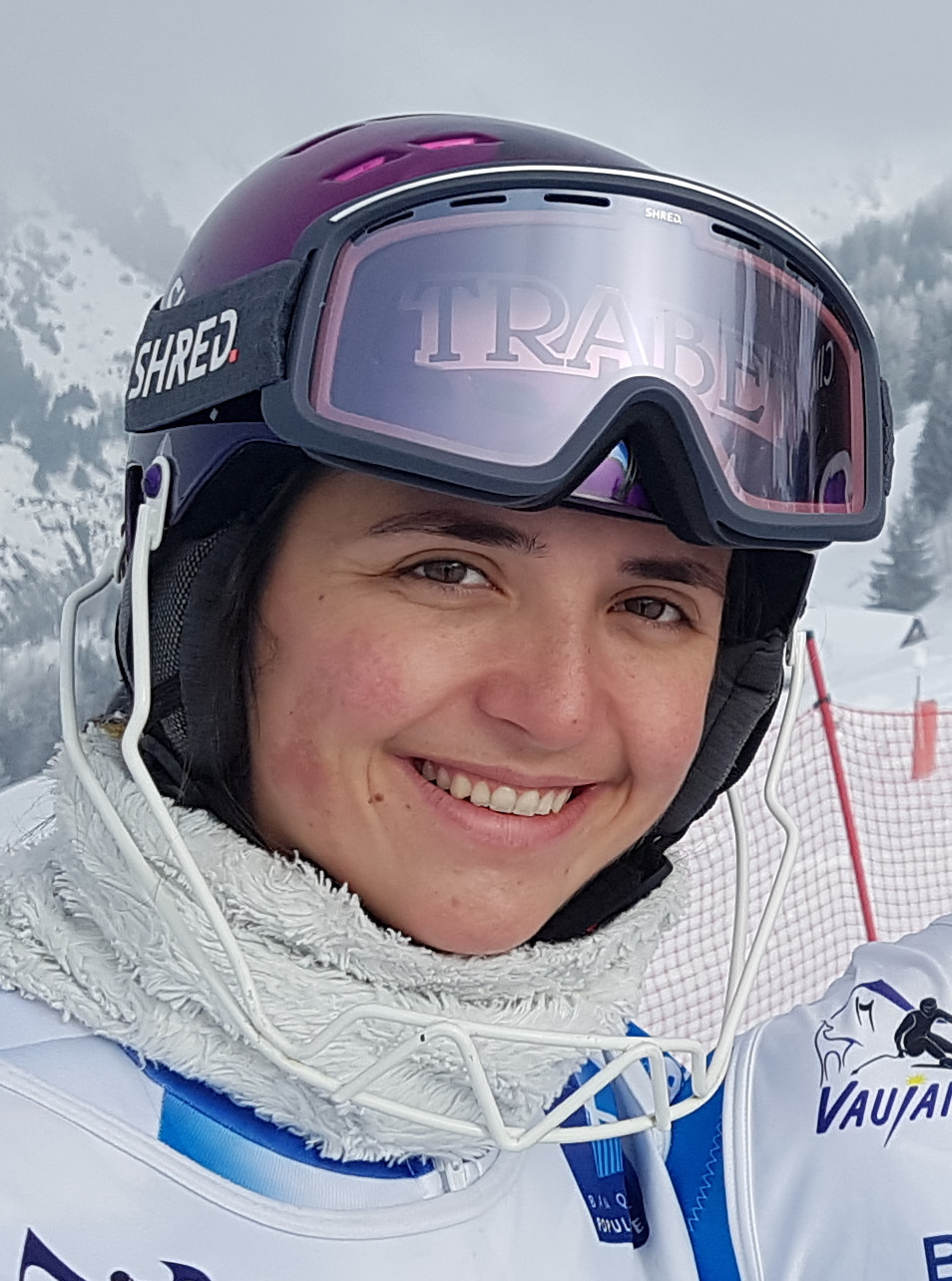
- Chevrier in 2023

Personal information
- Born: 6 November 2001 (age 24) Annecy, Haute-Savoie, France

Skiing career
- Country: France
- Sport: Alpine skiing
- Club: Club des Sports La Plagne
- Disciplines: Slalom, giant slalom
- World Cup debut: 11 November 2023 (age 22)

Olympics
- Teams: 1 – (2026)
- Medals: 0

World Championships
- Teams: 1 – (2025)
- Medals: 0

World Cup
- Seasons: 3 – (2024–2026)
- Podiums: 0
- Overall titles: 0 – (41st in 2026)
- Discipline titles: 0 – (11th in SL, 2026)

Marion Chevrier (born 6 November 2001) is a French World Cup alpine ski racer who specializes in the technical disciplines of slalom and giant slalom. She competed for France at the 2026 Winter Olympics and 2025 World Championships.

== Early life ==
Born in Annecy, Chevrier grew up skiing at the French ski resort of La Plagne with her twin sister, Axelle. Both of their parents are ski instructors at the resort. They joined Club des Sports La Plagne and began ski racing at the age of six.

== Career ==
Chevrier joined the French national junior team in 2018 and started racing on the Europa Cup tour in 2019. She made her first appearance at the Junior World Championships in Bansko, Bulgaria, in 2021. She returned for the 2022 edition in Panorama, Canada, where she recorded her best Junior Worlds result of eleventh in the super-G.

Chevrier's World Cup debut came on 11 November 2023 in the slalom at Levi, Finland, and she earned her first World Cup points two weeks later at Killington in Vermont. She gained points in four races during her inaugural World Cup season and also reached her first podium on the Europa Cup.

During the 2025 season, Chevrier split time between the World and Europa Cups and achieved victories in three Europa Cup slalom events. This earned her a trip to the 2025 World Championships in Saalbach, Austria, where she finished tenth in the slalom and eleventh in the team combined (partnered with Romane Miradoli). She ended the season in first place in the Europa Cup slalom standings.

Chevrier opened the 2026 season with her first World Cup top ten finish: a ninth place at Levi. That began a streak of earning points in each of her slalom starts for the season, including another top ten in Courchevel. Chevrier was named to the French team for the 2026 Winter Olympics, where she finished in eighth place in the team combined with Laura Gauché, but skied out during the first run of the individual slalom.

== World Cup results ==
=== Season standings ===
Season
Season	Age	Overall	Slalom	Giant slalom	Super-G	Downhill
2024	22	87	39	—	—	—
2025	23	91	39	—	—	—
2026	24	41	11	—	—	—

=== Top-ten finishes ===
- 0 podiums; 3 top tens

Season
Season	Date	Location	Discipline	Place
2026	15 November 2025	Levi, Finland	Slalom	9th
2026	16 December 2025	Courchevel, France	Slalom	9th
2026	24 March 2026	Hafjell, Norway	Slalom	10th

== World Championships results ==
Year
Year	Age	Slalom	Giant slalom	Super-G	Downhill	Team combined	Team event
2025	23	10	—	—	—	11	—

== Olympic results ==
Year
Year	Age	Slalom	Giant slalom	Super-G	Downhill	Team combined
2026	24	DNF1	—	—	—	8
