= Oscar Andreas Sandvik =

Norwegian alpine skier (born 2004)

Personal information
- Born: 12 July 2004 (age 22) Bærum, Norway

Skiing career
- Country: Norway
- Sport: Alpine skiing
- Club: IF Ready
- Disciplines: Slalom, giant slalom
- World Cup debut: 18 November 2023 (age 19)

Olympics
- Teams: 0

World Championships
- Teams: 0

World Cup
- Seasons: 3 – (2020–2026)
- Podiums: 0
- Overall titles: 0 – (65th in 2026)
- Discipline titles: 0 – (23rd in SL, 2026)
Medal record
Men's alpine skiing
Representing Norway
Junior World Championships
Bronze medal – third place	2023 St Anton	Giant slalom

Oscar Andreas Sandvik (born 12 July 2004) is a Norwegian World Cup alpine ski racer, specializing in the technical events of slalom and giant slalom.

== Career ==
Born in Bærum and a member of the IF Ready ski club, Sandvik began his international racing career in FIS races in late 2020 when he was sixteen years old.

He made his first start on the Europa Cup in February 2022, then participated in his first major international competition at the 2022 Junior World Championships at Panorama in British Columbia, Canada. The next year at the 2023 Junior World Championships in St Anton, Austria, Sandivk won bronze in the giant slalom and just missed the podium with a fourth place in slalom.

Sandvik's World Cup debut came on 18 November 2023 at the 2023–24 slalom season opener in Grugl, Austria. In April 2024, Sandvik edged out 2021 slalom World Champion Sebastian Foss-Solevåg to surprisingly win the Norwegian National Championship in slalom at his second race back after three months away to recover from an injury.

Sandvik earned his first Europa Cup victory at the 2024–25 season's first stop in Levi, Finland, and would proceed to collect two more wins and six other podiums that winter. He claimed the overall and slalom Europa Cup season titles, and was third in the giant slalom standings.

On the World Cup tour full-time for the 2025–26 season, Sandvik achieved the best two results of his young career in consecutive December weeks with a fifth place in the slalom at Val d’Isère and a ninth at Alta Badia. His results were good enough to be named to the Norwegian team for the 2026 Winter Olympics. The Norwegian men had multiple specialists in the technical disciplines qualify for the team, however, and ultimately Sandvik was not able to secure one of Norway's four starting spots in either the slalom or giant slalom. So despite being a member of the team, Sandvik was not able to participate in the Games and was instead the first reserve. His overall season results were sufficient to place in the top 25 of the World Cup slalom standings, so he qualified for the season final in Hafjell, Norway, at the end of March.

== World Cup results ==
=== Season standings ===
Season
Season	Age	Overall	Slalom	Giant slalom	Super-G	Downhill
2025	20	124	43	—	—	—
2026	21	65	23	37	—	—

=== Top-ten results ===
- 0 podiums, 2 top tens

Season
Season	Date	Location	Discipline	Place
2026	14 December 2025	Val d'Isère, France	Slalom	5th
2026	22 December 2025	Alta Badia, Italy	Slalom	9th
