= Hilma Lövblom =

Swedish alpine skier (born 2000)

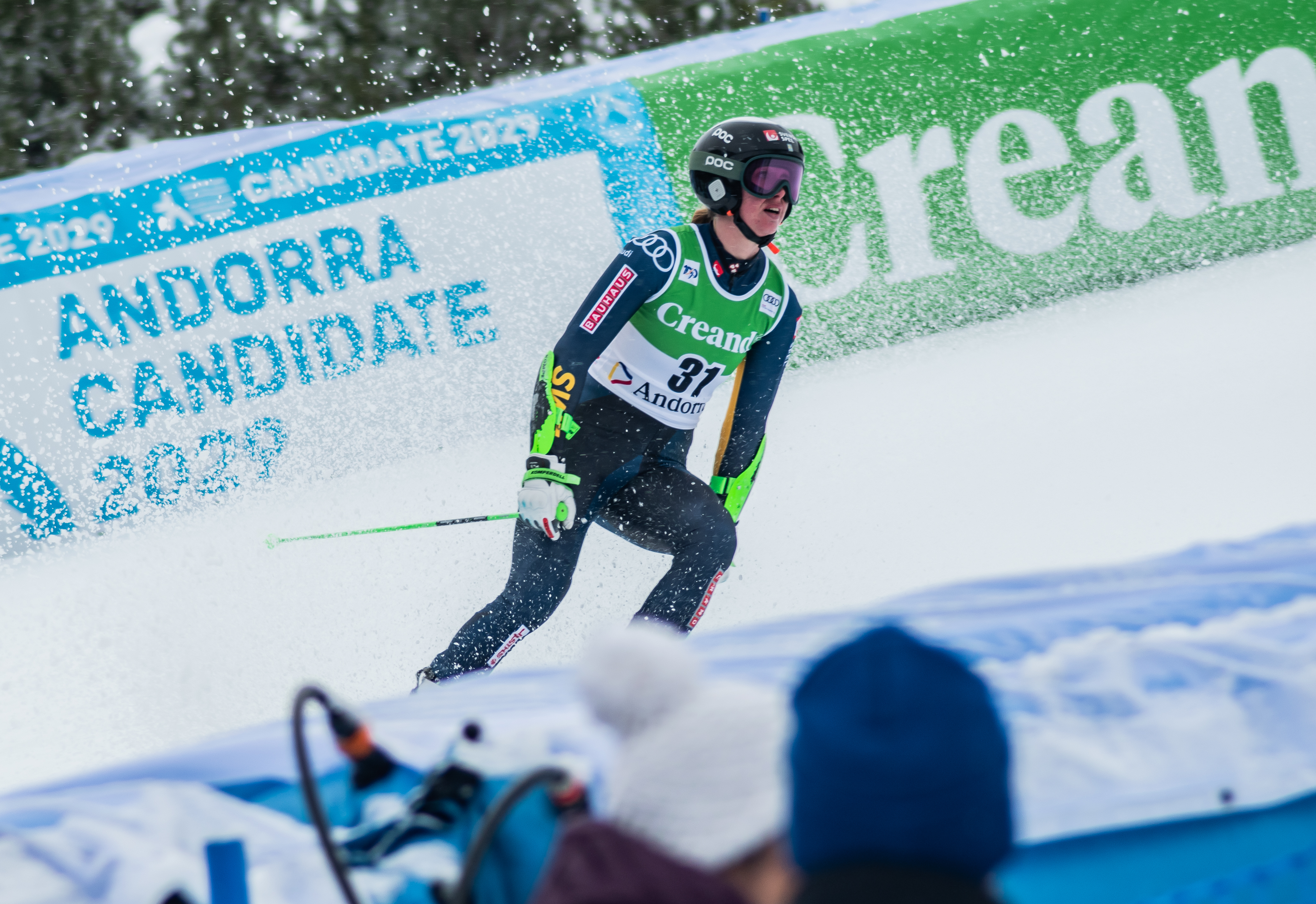
- Lövblom in 2024

Personal information
- Born: 16 August 2000 (age 25) Täby, Sweden

Skiing career
- Country: Sweden
- Sport: Alpine skiing
- Club: Täby SLK
- Disciplines: Giant slalom
- World Cup debut: 16 January 2021 (age 20)

Olympics
- Teams: 1 – (2022)
- Medals: 0

World Championships
- Teams: 1 – (2023)
- Medals: 0

World Cup
- Seasons: 6 – (2021–2026)
- Podiums: 0
- Overall titles: 0 – (89th in 2023)
- Discipline titles: 0 – (37th in GS, 2023)

Hilma Lövblom (born 16 August 2000) is a Swedish World Cup alpine ski racer. She made her World Cup debut in 2021. She participated in the 2022 Winter Olympics in Beijing.

== World Cup results ==
=== Season standings ===
Season
Season	Age	Overall	Slalom	Giant slalom	Super-G	Downhill
2022	21	127	—	54	—	—
2023	22	89	—	37	33	43
2024	23	111	—	44	—	—
2025	24	111	—	49	—	—
2026	25	97	—	42	—	—

Standings through 31 January 2026

=== Top twenty finishes ===
- 0 podiums, 3 top twenties

Season
Season	Date	Location	Discipline	Place
2023	25 January 2023	Kronplatz, Italy	Giant slalom	13th
2024	3 December 2023	Tremblant, Canada	Giant slalom	19th
2026	7 December 2023	Tremblant, Canada	Giant slalom	18th

== World Championship results ==
Year
Year	Age	Slalom	Giant slalom	Super-G	Downhill	Combined
2023	22	—	DNF1	—	—	—

== Olympic results ==
Year
Year	Age	Slalom	Giant slalom	Super-G	Downhill	Combined	Team event
2022	22	—	DNF2	—	—	—	13
