= FIS Alpine World Ski Championships 2025 – Women's slalom =

Women's slalom at the FIS Alpine World Ski Championships 2025
- Venue: Skicircus Saalbach-Hinterglemm/Leogang
- Location: Saalbach-Hinterglemm, Austria
- Dates: 15 February
- Competitors: 113 from 50 nations
- Winning time: 1:58.00

Medalists
gold medal	Camille Rast	Switzerland
silver medal	Wendy Holdener	Switzerland
bronze medal	Katharina Liensberger	Austria

Women's Slalom
- Location: Ulli Maier; Saalbach, Austria
- Vertical: 218 m (715 ft)
- Top elevation: 1,279 m (4,196 ft)
- Base elevation: 1,061 m (3,481 ft)

The Women's slalom competition at the FIS Alpine World Ski Championships 2025 was held on Saturday, 15 February 2025.

== Results ==
The first run was started at 09:45 and the second run at 13:15.

Rank	Bib	Name	Nation	Run 1	Rank	Run 2	Rank	Total	Diff
1st place, gold medalist(s)	4	Camille Rast	Switzerland	58.91	1	59.09	4	1:58.00	
2nd place, silver medalist(s)	2	Wendy Holdener	Switzerland	59.71	4	58.75	1	1:58.46	+0.46
3rd place, bronze medalist(s)	1	Katharina Liensberger	Austria	59.49	2	59.83	13	1:59.32	+1.32
4	13	Paula Moltzan	United States	1:00.46	5	58.88	2	1:59.34	+1.34
5	3	Mikaela Shiffrin	United States	59.63	3	59.74	12	1:59.37	+1.37
6	10	Andreja Slokar	Slovenia	1:00.48	6	59.05	3	1:59.53	+1.53
7	9	Katharina Truppe	Austria	1:00.51	7	59.52	7	2:00.03	+2.03
8	7	Lena Dürr	Germany	1:00.84	8	59.61	8	2:00.45	+2.45
9	6	Zrinka Ljutić	Croatia	1:01.05	9	59.68	9	2:00.73	+2.73
10	37	Marion Chevrier	France	1:01.95	16	59.16	5	2:01.11	+3.11
11	20	Cornelia Öhlund	Sweden	1:02.26	18	59.19	6	2:01.45	+3.45
12	21	Marie Lamure	France	1:01.93	14	59.71	10	2:01.64	+3.64
13	34	Lara Della Mea	Italy	1:02.31	19	59.71	10	2:02.02	+4.02
14	15	Katharina Huber	Austria	1:01.85	30	1:00.18	16	2:02.03	+4.03
15	32	Marta Rossetti	Italy	1:01.49	25	1:00.75	20	2:02.24	+4.24
16	25	Martina Dubovská	Czech Republic	1:02.77	22	1:00.03	15	2:02.80	+4.80
17	23	Hanna Aronsson Elfman	Sweden	1:02.56	21	1:00.29	18	2:02.85	+4.85
18	27	Ana Bucik	Slovenia	1:03.20	23	1:00.20	17	2:03.40	+5.40
19	31	AJ Hurt	United States	1:02.44	20	1:01.26	24	2:03.70	+5.70
20	40	Reece Bell	United Kingdom	1:04.36	27	59.93	14	2:04.29	+6.29
21	45	Giorgia Collomb	Italy	1:03.74	25	1:00.64	19	2:04.38	+6.38
22	22	Martina Peterlini	Italy	1:03.66	24	1:00.97	22	2:04.63	+6.63
23	33	Victoria Palla	United Kingdom	1:04.02	26	1:01.22	23	2:05.24	+7.24
24	47	Asa Ando	Japan	1:04.46	28	1:00.94	21	2:05.40	+7.40
25	46	Eren Watanabe	Japan	1:05.64	29	1:02.55	25	2:08.19	+10.19
26	52	Kiara Derks	Netherlands	1:06.26	30	1:03.46	26	2:09.72	+11.72
27	54	Liene Bondare	Latvia	1:08.07	31	1:06.82	27	2:14.89	+16.89
28	68	Nino Tsiklauri	Georgia	1:09.05	33	1:08.69	28	2:17.74	+19.74
29	64	Lara Markthaler	South Africa	1:09.01	32	1:08.82	29	2:17.83	+19.83
30	81	Hanna Majtényi	Hungary	1:14.03	34	1:13.10	30	2:27.13	+29.13
31	76	Lili Polányi	Hungary	1:14.60	35	1:14.32	31	2:28.92	+30.92
32	79	Nikolina Dragoljević	Bosnia and Herzegovina	1:16.12	37	1:14.79	32	2:30.91	+32.91
33	89	Bernadett Balogh Lorinc	Romania	1:17.50	38	1:15.22	33	2:32.72	+34.72
34	94	Leticija Matisone	Latvia	1:25.31	41	1:20.34	34	2:45.65	+47.65
35	100	Eloise King	Hong Kong	1:22.61	40	1:23.19	35	2:45.80	+47.80
36	101	Albina Ivanova	Kyrgyzstan	1:37.64	43	1:30.48	36	3:08.12	+1:10.12
37	93	Sadaf Saveh-Shemshaki	Iran	1:39.17	44	1:37.01	37	3:16.18	+1:18.18
38	107	Sarah Stephan	Lebanon	1:36.81	42	1:48.31	39	3:25.12	+1:27.12
39	105	Valeriya Kovaleva	Uzbekistan	1:44.95	45	1:40.40	38	3:25.35	+1:27.35
	5	Sara Hector	Sweden	1:01.68	12	Did not finish			
	8	Melanie Meillard	Switzerland	1:01.41	10	Did not finish			
	12	Mina Fürst Holtmann	Norway	1:01.94	15	Did not finish			
	18	Ali Nullmeyer	Canada	1:02.18	17	Did not finish			
	86	Mialitiana Clerc	Madagascar	1:16.01	36	Did not finish			
	90	Elizabete Reinharde	Latvia	1:18.27	39	Did not finish			
	11	Anna Swenn-Larsson	Sweden	Did not finish					
	14	Lara Colturi	Albania	Did not finish					
	16	Laurence St-Germain	Canada	Did not finish					
	17	Neja Dvornik	Slovenia	Did not finish					
	19	Emma Aicher	Germany	Did not finish					
	24	Katharina Gallhuber	Austria	Did not finish					
	26	Chiara Pogneaux	France	Did not finish					
	28	Amelia Smart	Canada	Did not finish					
	29	Eliane Christen	Switzerland	Did not finish					
	30	Thea Louise Stjernesund	Norway	Did not finish					
	35	Jessica Hilzinger	Germany	Did not finish					
	36	Katie Hensien	United States	Did not finish					
	39	Chisaki Maeda	Japan	Did not finish					
	41	Carla Mijares Ruf	Spain	Did not finish					
	42	Francesca Baruzzi	Argentina	Did not finish					
	43	Lila Lapanja	Slovenia	Did not finish					
	44	Zita Tóth	Hungary	Did not finish					
	48	Kim Vanreusel	Belgium	Did not finish					
	49	Axelle Mollin	Belgium	Did not finish					
	50	Noa Blok	Netherlands	Did not finish					
	51	Noa Szőllős	Israel	Did not finish					
	53	Noa Rabou	Netherlands	Did not finish					
	55	Gwyneth ten Raa	Luxembourg	Did not finish					
	56	Molly Butler	United Kingdom	Did not finish					
	57	Anina Zurbriggen	Bulgaria	Did not finish					
	58	Elese Sommerová	Czech Republic	Did not finish					
	59	Abi Bruce	United Kingdom	Did not finish					
	60	Phoebe Heaydon	Australia	Did not finish					
	61	Sophie Mahon	Australia	Did not finish					
	62	Clara-Marie Holmer Vorre	Denmark	Did not finish					
	63	Jana Atanasovska	North Macedonia	Did not finish					
	65	Aruwin Salehhuddin	Malaysia	Did not finish					
	66	Szonja Hozmann	Hungary	Did not finish					
	67	Nuunu Chemnitz Berthelsen	Denmark	Did not finish					
	69	Ceren Reyhan Yıldırım	Turkey	Did not finish					
	70	Maria Constantin	Romania	Did not finish					
	71	Liepa Karlonaitė	Lithuania	Did not finish					
	72	Joyce ten Raa	Luxembourg	Did not finish					
	73	Esma Alić	Bosnia and Herzegovina	Did not finish					
	74	Hófi Dóra Friðgeirsdóttir	Iceland	Did not finish					
	75	Lirika Deva	Kosovo	Did not finish					
	77	Yuliia Makovetska	Ukraine	Did not finish					
	78	Anastasiia Shepilenko	Ukraine	Did not finish					
	80	Ina Likić	Bosnia and Herzegovina	Did not finish					
	82	Kiana Kryezu	Kosovo	Did not finish					
	83	Ariana Haben Ribeiro	Portugal	Did not finish					
	84	Maria Nikoleta Kaltsogianni	Greece	Did not finish					
	85	Ioana Corlățeanu	Romania	Did not finish					
	87	Lee Wen-yi	Chinese Taipei	Did not finish					
	88	Andrea Loizidou	Cyprus	Did not finish					
	91	Gabija Šinkūnaitė	Lithuania	Did not finish					
	92	Annija Bieza	Latvia	Did not finish					
	95	Manon Chad	Lebanon	Did not finish					
	96	Kiana Sakkal	Lebanon	Did not finish					
	97	Zahra Alizadeh	Iran	Did not finish					
	98	Marjan Kalhor	Iran	Did not finish					
	99	Sabina Rejepova	Uzbekistan	Did not finish					
	102	Sarina Ahmadpour	Iran	Did not finish					
	103	Evridiki Dimitrof	Greece	Did not finish					
	104	Eirini Filippidi	Greece	Did not finish					
	106	Christa Rahme	Lebanon	Did not finish					
	108	Sandhya Sandhya	India	Did not finish					
	109	Joud Farhoud	Saudi Arabia	Did not finish					
	110	Aanchal Thakur	India	Did not finish					
	111	Olga Paliutkina	Kyrgyzstan	Did not finish					
	112	Arba Pupovci	Kosovo	Did not finish					
	113	Tanuja Thakur	India	Did not finish					
	116	Celine Marti	Haiti	Did not finish					
	38	Charlotte Lingg	Liechtenstein	Did not start					
	114	Debora Timalsina	Nepal	Did not start					
	115	Kseniya Grigoreva	Uzbekistan	Did not start					
