= Alpine skiing at the 2026 Winter Olympics – Women's team combined =

Women's team combined at the XXV Olympic Winter Games
- Alpine skiing
- Venue: Olimpia delle Tofane, Cortina d'Ampezzo
- Date: 10 February 2026
- Winning time: 2:21.66

Medalists
1st place, gold medalist(s)		Ariane Rädler; Katharina Huber	Austria
2nd place, silver medalist(s)		Kira Weidle-Winkelmann; Emma Aicher	Germany
3rd place, bronze medalist(s)		Jacqueline Wiles; Paula Moltzan	United States

The women's team combined competition of the 2026 Winter Olympics was held on Tuesday, 10 February, at Olimpia delle Tofane in Cortina d'Ampezzo, Italy. This was the inaugural edition of this event at the Olympics. Ariane Rädler (downhill) and Katharina Huber (slalom) of Austria won the event. Kira Weidle-Winkelmann (downhill) and Emma Aicher (slalom) of Germany were second, and Jacqueline Wiles (downhill) and Paula Moltzan (slalom) of the United States third. Rädler, Weidle-Winkelmann, Wiles, and Moltzan won their first Olympic medals.

== Background ==
Breezy Johnson and Mikaela Shiffrin were the 2025 World Ski Championships gold medalists in women's team combined.

== Results ==
The downhill was started at 10:30 followed by slalom at 14:00 local time (UTC+1). The downhill was held under mostly cloudy skies and the snow condition was icy; the air temperature was −1.8 °C (29 °F) at the starting gate and 0.4 °C (33 °F) at the finish area. The slalom was held under mostly cloudy skies and the snow condition was wet; the air temperature was −2.6 °C (27 °F) at the starting gate and 0.9 °C (34 °F) at the finish area.

Ranking	Bib	Country	Downhill				Slalom				Total	
Ranking	Bib	Country	Athlete	Time	Deficit	Ranking	Athlete	Time	Deficit	Ranking	Time	Deficit
1st place, gold medalist(s)	3	Austria	Ariane Rädler	1:36.65	+0.06	2	Katharina Huber	45.01	+0.63	10	2:21.66	—
2nd place, silver medalist(s)	13	Germany	Kira Weidle-Winkelmann	1:37.33	+0.74	6	Emma Aicher	44.38	—	1	2:21.71	+0.05
3rd place, bronze medalist(s)	8	United States	Jacqueline Wiles	1:37.04	+0.45	4	Paula Moltzan	44.87	+0.49	4	2:21.91	+0.25
4	14	United States	Breezy Johnson	1:36.59	—	1	Mikaela Shiffrin	45.38	+1.00	15	2:21.97	+0.31
5	11	Austria	Cornelia Hütter	1:37.19	+0.60	5	Katharina Truppe	45.08	+0.70	13	2:22.27	+0.61
6	16	Switzerland	Jasmine Flury	1:38.13	+1.54	13	Wendy Holdener	44.41	+0.03	2	2:22.54	+0.88
7	2	Austria	Nina Ortlieb	1:37.60	+1.01	9	Katharina Gallhuber	45.03	+0.65	11	2:22.63	+0.97
8	20	France	Laura Gauché	1:37.92	+1.33	11	Marion Chevrier	44.87	+0.49	4	2:22.79	+1.13
9	17	Switzerland	Corinne Suter	1:38.10	+1.51	12	Camille Rast	44.80	+0.42	3	2:22.90	+1.24
10	10	Italy	Nicol Delago	1:37.75	+1.16	10	Anna Trocker	45.19	+0.81	14	2:22.94	+1.28
11	12	Norway	Kajsa Vickhoff Lie	1:37.36	+0.77	7	Bianca Bakke Westhoff	45.62	+1.24	16	2:22.98	+1.32
12	22	France	Camille Cerutti	1:38.69	+2.10	17	Caitlin McFarlane	45.00	+0.62	9	2:23.69	+2.03
13	21	Canada	Valérie Grenier	1:39.10	+2.51	19	Laurence St-Germain	44.95	+0.57	7	2:24.05	+2.39
14	15	Austria	Mirjam Puchner	1:38.18	+1.59	14	Lisa Hörhager	45.99	+1.61	17	2:24.05	+2.39
15	23	United States	Keely Cashman	1:39.91	+3.32	21	AJ Hurt	44.99	+0.61	8	2:24.90	+3.24
16	24	Czech Republic	Barbora Nováková	1:41.41	+4.82	23	Martina Dubovská	44.88	+0.50	6	2:26.29	+4.63
17	27	Argentina	Nicole Begue	1:44.15	+7.56	24	Francesca Baruzzi Farriol	45.03	+0.65	11	2:29.18	+7.52
18	25	Czech Republic	Elisa Maria Negri	1:45.22	+8.63	25	Alena Labaštová	46.94	+2.56	18	2:32.16	+10.50
—	1	France	Romane Miradoli	1:37.37	+0.78	8	Marie Lamure	DNF			DNF	
—	4	Switzerland	Janine Schmitt	1:38.50	+1.91	16	Mélanie Meillard	DNF			DNF	
—	5	Switzerland	Delia Durrer	1:39.06	+2.47	18	Eliane Christen	DNF			DNF	
—	6	Italy	Laura Pirovano	1:36.86	+0.27	3	Martina Peterlini	DNF			DNF	
—	7	Slovenia	Ilka Štuhec	1:38.29	+1.70	15	Ana Bucik Jogan	DNF			DNF	
—	19	Italy	Nadia Delago	1:39.42	+2.83	20	Giada D'Antonio	DNF			DNF	
—	28	Slovakia	Katarína Šrobová	1:46.66	+10.07	26	Petra Vlhová	DNF			DNF	
—	26	Canada	Cassidy Gray	1:41.15	+4.56	22	Ali Nullmeyer	DSQ			DNF	
—	9	Italy	Sofia Goggia	DNF			Lara Della Mea	DNS			DNF	
—	18	United States	Isabella Wright	DNF			Nina O'Brien	DNS			DNF	
