= 2025 Alpine Skiing World Cup – Women's slalom =

Alpine ski discipline year standings

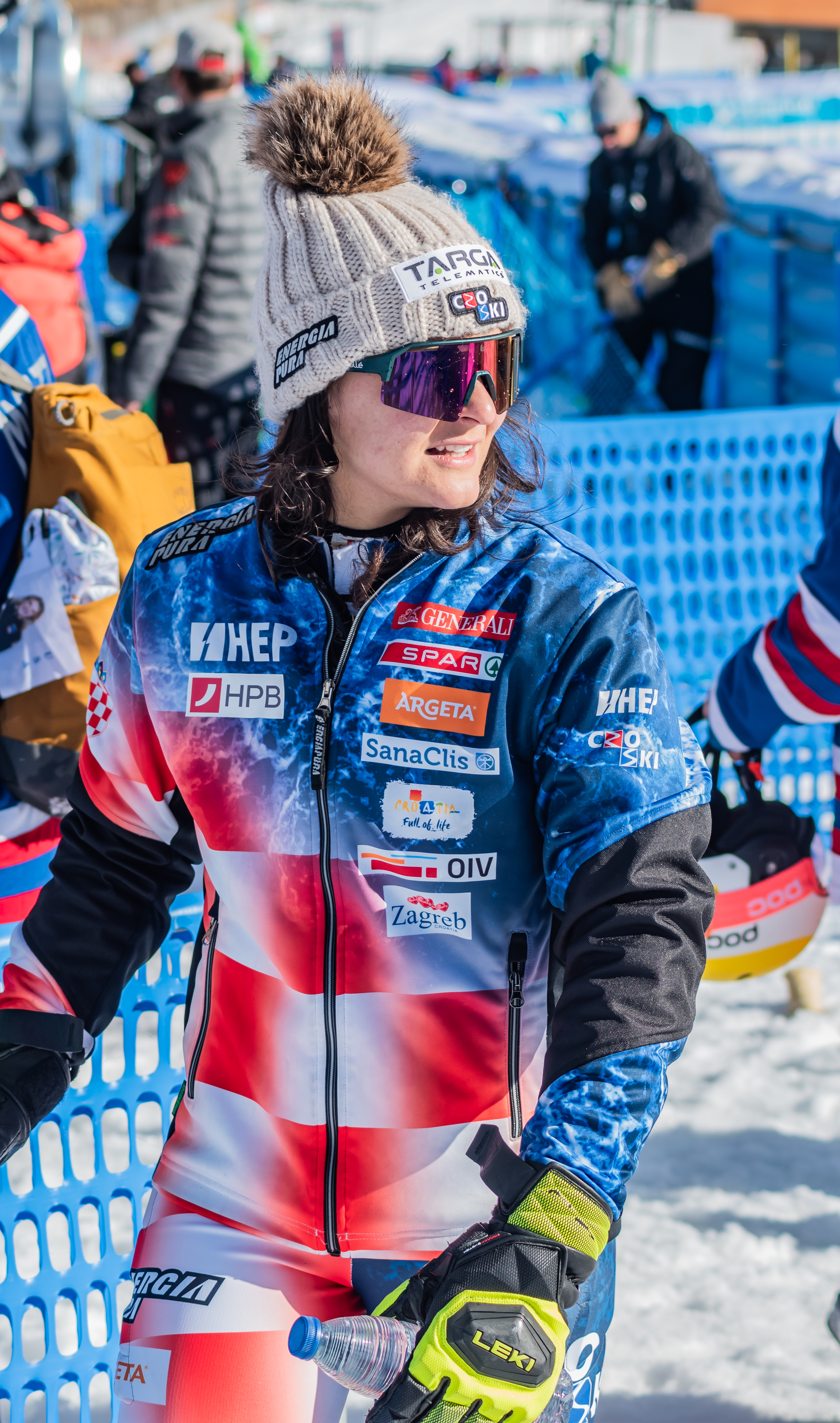
2025 Women's Slalom World Cup: Zrinka Ljutić of Croatia, discipline champion; 2025 Women's World Cup; Overall • Downhill • Super-G; Giant slalom • Slalom
Previous: 2024	Next: 2026

The women's slalom in the 2025 FIS Alpine Skiing World Cup consisted of ten events, including the final. The slalom season began with the traditional "reindeer" opening race in Levi, Finland on 16 November 2024. Two-time discipline champion Petra Vlhová of Slovakia was expected to miss the entire season with an injury suffered in January 2024, and she did, which left eight-time discipline champion and two-time defending champion Mikaela Shiffrin of the United States without her main rival. However, Shiffrin then was seriously injured before the second race of the season and missed multiple events before returning at less than full strength, leaving the field wide open. The season came down to finals before 20-year-old Zrinka Ljutić of Croatia emerged victorious over 2021 discipline champion Katharina Liensberger of Austria.

The season was interrupted for the Alpine Skiing World Championships, this time in Saalbach, Austria during 4–16 February 2025. The championship in women's slalom took place on Saturday, 15 February, and was won by the season's discipline leader at the time, Camille Rast of Switzerland, with her countrywoman Wendy Holdener placing second.

== Season summary ==
Picking up where she left off, defending champion Mikaela Shiffrin of the United States won the season-opening slalom in Levi, Finland (and the baby reindeer that comes with the victory) for the eighth time in her career, giving her an all-time record 98 total victories in World Cup skiing. Shiffrin then won another slalom, her 99th World Cup victory, the very next week in Gurgl, Austria ahead of rising star (and first-time World Cup podium occupant) Lara Colturi of Albania, who just turned 18 the prior week and is the daughter of 2002 Olympic super-G gold medalist Daniela Ceccarelli, and 25-year-old Swiss skier (and fellow first-time podium occupant) Camille Rast of Switzerland. However, Shiffrin was injured during a giant slalom run at Killington and had to miss the slalom there the next day. The injury was eventually diagnosed as an abdominal puncture wound (which could not be stitched up due to the possibility of infection) combined with "severe muscle trauma", and she was anticipated to miss at least the next two weeks. However, Shiffrin then had to undergo abdominal surgery to clean out the wound and old scar tissue, perhaps delaying her return to competition until the World Championships in February.

In the first race without Shiffrin, Rast, who had posted her second-straight World Cup podium the day before, rallied from third on the second leg to post her first World Cup victory and take the lead in both the discipline and overall for the season. Surprisingly, the next two slaloms were both won by another rising star (and previous non-winner), 20-year-old Zrinka Ljutić of Croatia, one just before New Year's Day and one just after (in which she edged veteran star Wendy Holdener of Switzerland on the second run), propelling her into the season lead in the discipline by just four points over Rast. In the next slalom at Flachau (Austria), Ljutic failed to qualify for the second run, and Rast charged from eighth after the first run to edge out Holdener for the win and to take over both the lead in the discipline and the overall lead for the World Cup season.

At long last, Shiffrin announced her upcoming return at the slalom in Courcheval, France on 30 January, a full nine weeks after her injury and less than a week before the start of the world championships. At Courcheval, Ljutić posted her third slalom victory of the season, making her the first woman other than Schiffrin or Vhlová to win three slaloms in one season since Marlies Schild of Austria in 2012, while Shiffrin finished tenth in her return. In the World Championships, Rast posted the best time in the first run and Holdener posted the best time in the second run for a 1-2 Swiss finish, with the home country's Katharina Liensberger nipping Americans Paula Moltzan and Shiffrin to claim the bronze. After another week to build strength, though, Shiffrin turned a slight lead over Ljutić after the first run into a wide victory on the second run, giving her a third victory for the season -- and an all-time record 100 World Cup victories in Alpine skiing overall (and tying the all-time record of 155 podium finishes that had been held by Ingemar Stenmark, whom she had previously passed for most victories), while Ljutić edged past Rast for the season lead with only two races remaining in the discipline. At Åre, 29-year-old Katharina Truppe of Austria recorded her first World Cup victory in come-from-behind fashion, while first-run leader Shiffrin held on for third and thus broke the all-time World Cup podium record.

== Finals ==
The World Cup finals in the discipline took place on Thursday, 27 March 2025 in Sun Valley, Idaho, United States. Only the top 25 skiers in the World Cup slalom discipline and the winner of the Junior World Championship in the discipline (Cornelia Öhlund of Sweden), plus any skiers who have scored at least 500 points in the World Cup overall classification for the season, were eligible to compete in the final, and only the top 15 earned World Cup points. As Öhlund was already among the top 25, no 500+ point skiers who were not otherwise eligible chose to enter, and only one eligible skier (Clarisse Brèche of France) missed the race due to injury, the starting field consisted of 24 skiers.

Coming into the finals, Ljutić held a 41-point lead over Rast, a 51-point lead over Liensberger, and a 96-point lead over Holdener; the four of them were the only four still in contention for the discipline title. The race itself was no contest, as Shiffrin, now much further along in her recovery and in front of a supportive home crowd (including a number of girls dressed as Dalmatians, because Shiffrin was seeking win number 101) blew out the field by over a second; meanwhile, Ljutić's 10th-place finish, worth 26 points, beat Rast head-to-head and earned enough points that neither Liensberger nor Holdener could catch her, giving Ljutić her first discipline championship.

== Standings ==
	Venue	16 Nov 2024; Levi	23 Nov 2024; Gurgl	1 Dec 2024; Killington	29 Dec 2024; Semmering	5 Jan 2025; Kranjska Gora	14 Jan 2025; Flachau	30 Jan 2025; Courchevel	15 Feb 2025; Saalbach WC	23 Feb 2025; Sestriere	9 Mar 202; Åre	27 Mar 2025; Sun Valley	
#	Skier	(Finland)	(Austria)	(United States)	(Austria)	(Slovenia)	(Austria)	(France)	(Austria)	(Italy)	(Sweden)	(United States)	Total
	(Croatia) Zrinka Ljutić	40	29	40	100	100	DNQ	100	⑨	80	26	26	541
2	(Austria) Katharina Liensberger	80	36	29	60	29	50	50	③	50	80	45	509
3	(Switzerland) Camille Rast	45	60	100	50	50	100	45	①	DNF1	24	18	492
4	(United States) Mikaela Shiffrin	100	100	DNS				26	⑤	100	60	100	486
5	(Germany) Lena Dürr	60	45	50	80	DNF1	26	60	⑧	36	36	80	473
6	(Switzerland) Wendy Holdener	15	50	80	40	80	80	DNF2	②	29	45	50	469
7	(Sweden) Anna Swenn-Larsson	50	16	80	DNQ	60	36	7	DNF1	32	50	16	347
8	(Switzerland) Mélanie Meillard	36	26	45	36	45	45	36	DNF2	5	DNF2	36	310
9	(Sweden) Sara Hector	12	32	22	45	40	60	80	DNF2	14	DSQ1	0	305
10	(Albania) Lara Colturi	DNF2	80	32	18	20	20	40	DNF1	20	22	24	276
11	(United States) Paula Moltzan	32	40	DNF2	DNF1	11	40	DNF1	④	60	40	40	263
12	(Slovenia) Andreja Slokar	DNF2	22	26	29	36	DSQ1	29	⑥	26	32	60	260
13	(Austria) Katharina Truppe	12	DNF2	24	20	32	DNF1	24	⑦	22	100	DNF1	234
14	(Austria) Katharina Huber	DNF2	22	20	26	24	16	32	⑭	13	14	22	189
15	(Norway) Mina Fürst Holtmann	DNF1	7	18	16	18	29	12	DNF2	16	16	32	164
16	(Sweden) Cornelia Öhlund	14	18	7	15	15	22	DNF1	⑪	45	20	0	156
17	(Germany) Emma Aicher	29	DNF1	DNF2	32	DNF2	32	DNF1	DNF1	40	DNF1	20	153
18	(Canada) Laurence St. Germain	26	24	36	7	DNS	24	DNQ	DNF1	4	DNQ	0	121
19	(France) Marie Lamure	24	DNQ	14	11	26	DNF1	13	⑫	12	DNF2	DSQ1	100
20	(Slovenia) Neja Dvornik	16	12	13	DNF2	14	10	14	DNF1	6	10	0	95
21	(Sweden) Hanna Aronsson Elfman	18	DNF1	10	14	DNQ	6	22	⑰	9	15	0	94
22	(Canada) Ali Nullmeyer	DNF2	13	DSQ1	DNS			20	DNF2	24	DNQ	29	86
23	(Italy) Martina Peterlini	14	11	DSQ2	DNF2	7	12	16	㉒	12	12	DSQ1	84
24	(France) Clarisse Brèche	22	8	5	8	4	18	DNF1	DNS				65
25	(Italy) Lara Della Mea	DNF1	DNF2	DNQ	DNQ	DNQ	15	9	⑬	10	18	0	52
26	(Italy) Marta Rossetti	DNQ	DNF1	DNQ	DNQ	DNQ	DNF2	DNF2	⑮	15	32	NE	47
	(Slovenia) Ana Bucik Jogan	9	DNQ	DNF1	10	DNQ	DNF1	10	⑱	8	10	NE	47
28	(Switzerland) Eliane Christen	DNS		DNQ	22	16	DNQ	6	DNF1	DNQ	DNQ	NE	44
	(United States) AJ Hurt	DNS			13	DNF2	DNF2	DNF1	⑲	20	11	NE	44
30	(Austria) Franziska Gritsch	DNQ	DNQ	6	24	12	DNQ	DNQ	DNS	DNQ	DNQ	NE	42
31	(Austria) Katharina Gallhuber	6	15	DNF1	DNS			DNF2	DNF1	7	13	NE	41
32	(Czech Republic) Martina Dubovská	DNF2	9	DNF2	12	8	DNF2	DNQ	⑯	DNQ	7	NE	36
33	(Switzerland) Aline Höpli	DNQ	DNF1	16	DNQ	DNQ	7	11	DNS	DNQ	DNF1	NE	34
34	(Sweden) Estelle Alphand	DNQ	14	DNQ	DNQ	5	13	DNQ	DNS	DNQ	DNQ	NE	32
	(Canada) Amelia Smart	8	DNQ	DNQ	4	DNQ	14	DSQ1	DNF1	DNQ	6	NE	32
36	(Switzerland) Michelle Gisin	7	DNQ	12	DNS	3	8	DNS				NE	30
37	(France) Chiara Pogneaux	DNQ	5	11	6	6	DNQ	DNQ	DNF1	DNQ	DNF1	NE	28
38	(Croatia) Leona Popović	20	6	DNQ	DNS							NE	26
	(France) Marion Chevrier	DNQ	DNQ	DNF1	DNQ	DNQ	DNQ	18	⑩	DNQ	8	NE	26
40	(Austria) Lisa Hörhager	DNF1	DNQ	9	DSQ1	DNQ	DNQ	15	DNS	DNF1	DNQ	NE	24
41	(United States) Katie Hensien	DNF1	DNF2	DNQ	DNS	22	DNF1	DNF1	DNF1	DNF1	DNF2	NE	22
42	(Germany) Jessica Hilzinger	DNQ	DNQ	8	DNQ	10	DNQ	DNQ	DNF1	2	DNQ	NE	20
43	(Norway) Thea Louise Stjernesund	DNQ	DNQ	DNF1	9	DNQ	DNF2	8	DNF1	DNQ	DNQ	NE	17
44	(Italy) Giorgia Collomb	DNQ	DSQ2	15	DNQ	DNQ	DNQ	DNQ	㉑	DNQ	DNS	NE	15
	(Switzerland) Janine Mächler	DNQ	DNQ	DNS	5	7	DNS					NE	15
46	(Switzerland) Elena Stoffel	DNQ	DNQ	DNF1	DNF1	13	DNQ	DNF1	DNS	DNQ	DNQ	NE	13
47	(United States) Nina O'Brien	DNF1	DNQ	DNQ	DNQ	DNQ	11	DNS		DNF1	DNF1	NE	11
48	(Latvia) Dženifera Ģērmane	10	DNF1	DNS								NE	10
	(Italy) Beatrice Sola	DNQ	10	DNF1	DNS							NE	10
50	(France) Caitlin McFarlane	DNF1	DNQ	DNF1	DNQ	DNQ	9	DNF1	DNS	DNQ	DNF1	NE	9
51	(Japan) Asa Ando	DNS			DNF1	DNQ	DNF2	DNS	DNF1	1	5	NE	6
52	(Switzerland) Aline Danioth	DNQ	DNQ	DNF1	DNF2	DNQ	DNQ	DNF1	DNS	4	DNF1	NE	4
	(Italy) Emilia Mondinelli	DNS						DNF1	DNS	DNQ	4	NE	4
	References												

=== Legend ===
- Winner (100 points)
- 2nd place (80 points)
- 3rd place (60 points)
- DNQ = Did not qualify for run 2
- DNF1 = Did not finish run 1
- DSQ1 = Disqualified run 1
- DNF2 = Did not finish run 2
- DSQ2 = Disqualified run 2
- DNS2 = Did not start run 2
- Did not start (DNS)
- Not eligible for finals (NE)
- Race canceled (x)
- FIS non-World Cup race (World Championships)
- Updated on 27 March 2025, after all 10 events plus worlds.

== See also ==
- 2025 Alpine Skiing World Cup – Women's summary rankings
- 2025 Alpine Skiing World Cup – Women's overall
- 2025 Alpine Skiing World Cup – Women's downhill
- 2025 Alpine Skiing World Cup – Women's super-G
- 2025 Alpine Skiing World Cup – Women's giant slalom
- World Cup scoring system
