= FIS Alpine World Ski Championships 2025 – Women's team combined =

Women's team combined at the FIS Alpine World Ski Championships 2025
- Venue: Skicircus Saalbach-Hinterglemm/Leogang
- Location: Saalbach-Hinterglemm, Austria
- Dates: 11 February
- Competitors: 26 from 11 nations
- Teams: 26

Medalists
gold medal	Breezy Johnson; Mikaela Shiffrin	United States
silver medal	Lara Gut-Behrami; Wendy Holdener	Switzerland
bronze medal	Stephanie Venier; Katharina Truppe	Austria

Women's Team Combined Downhill
- Location: Ulli Maier; Saalbach, Austria
- Vertical: 761 m (2,497 ft)
- Top elevation: 1,833 m (6,014 ft)
- Base elevation: 1,072 m (3,517 ft)
- Longest run: 2.940 km (1.83 mi)

Women's Team Combined Slalom
- Location: Ulli Maier; Saalbach, Austria
- Vertical: 218 m (715 ft)
- Top elevation: 1,279 m (4,196 ft)
- Base elevation: 1,061 m (3,481 ft)

The Women's team combined competition at the FIS Alpine World Ski Championships 2025 was held on 11 February 2025.

== Results ==
The first run was started at 10:00 and the second run at 13:15.

Rank	Bib	Team	Time	Behind
1st place, gold medalist(s)	13	United States 1 Breezy Johnson; Mikaela Shiffrin	2:40.89; 1:42.11; 58.78	—
2nd place, silver medalist(s)	9	Switzerland 1 Lara Gut-Behrami; Wendy Holdener	2:41.28; 1:42.89; 58.39	+0.39
3rd place, bronze medalist(s)	14	Austria 3 Stephanie Venier; Katharina Truppe	2:41.42; 1:42.46; 58.96	+0.53
4	15	United States 2 Lauren Macuga; Paula Moltzan	2:41.53; 1:41.60; 59.93	+0.64
5	10	Austria 1 Mirjam Puchner; Katharina Liensberger	2:41.58; 1:41.88; 59.70	+0.69
6	8	Austria 2 Cornelia Hütter; Katharina Huber	2:41.64; 1:42.35; 59.29	+0.75
7	12	Switzerland 2 Corinne Suter; Camille Rast	2:41.65; 1:42.64; 59.01	+0.76
8	5	Italy 3 Nicol Delago; Marta Rossetti	2:41.82; 1:42.66; 59.16	+0.93
9	11	Slovenia; Ilka Štuhec; Andreja Slokar	2:41.97; 1:42.75; 59.22	+1.08
10	18	United States 4 Jacqueline Wiles; Katie Hensien	2:42.44; 1:43.60; 58.84	+1.55
11	23	France 2 Romane Miradoli; Marion Chevrier	2:42.49; 1:43.97; 58.52	+1.60
12	20	Switzerland 4 Priska Nufer; Eliane Christen	2:42.52; 1:43.16; 59.36	+1.63
13	16	France 1 Laura Gauché; Marie Lamure	2:42.79; 1:42.63; 1:00.16	+1.90
14	3	Italy 2 Elena Curtoni; Martina Peterlini	2:43.03; 1:43.98; 59.05	+2.14
15	1	Switzerland 3 Malorie Blanc; Mélanie Meillard	2:43.04; 1:44.10; 58.94	+2.15
16	19	United States 3 Lindsey Vonn; AJ Hurt	2:43.87; 1:44.11; 59.716	+2.98
17	4	Germany 1 Emma Aicher; Lena Dürr	2:45.12; 1:41.83; 1:03.29	+4.23
18	21	Andorra 1 Cande Moreno; Carla Mijares Ruf	2:45.36; 1:45.07; 1:00.29	+4.47
19	21	Canada; Cassidy Gray; Laurence St-Germain	2:45.54; 1:45.14; 1:00.40	+4.65
20	25	France 3 Karen Clément; Clarisse Brèche	2:47.12; 1:45.64; 1:01.48	+6.23
21	17	Austria 4 Christina Ager; Katharina Gallhuber	2:47.29; 1:43.97; 1:03.32	+6.40
22	24	Bosnia and Herzegovina 1 Elvedina Muzaferija; Esma Alić	2:54.64; 1:46.15; 1:08.49	+13.75
	2	Germany 2 Kira Weidle-Winkelmann; Jessica Hilzinger	— 1:42.21; DNF	Did not finish
	6	Italy 1 Laura Pirovano; Giorgia Collomb	— 1:43.56; DNF	Did not finish
	7	Norway; Kajsa Vickhoff Lie; Mina Fürst Holtmann	— 1:43.91; DNF	Did not finish
	22	France 4 Camille Cerutti; Caitlin McFarlane	— 1:45.71; DNS	Did not start
