= 2026 Alpine Skiing World Cup – Women's giant slalom =

Alpine ski discipline year standings

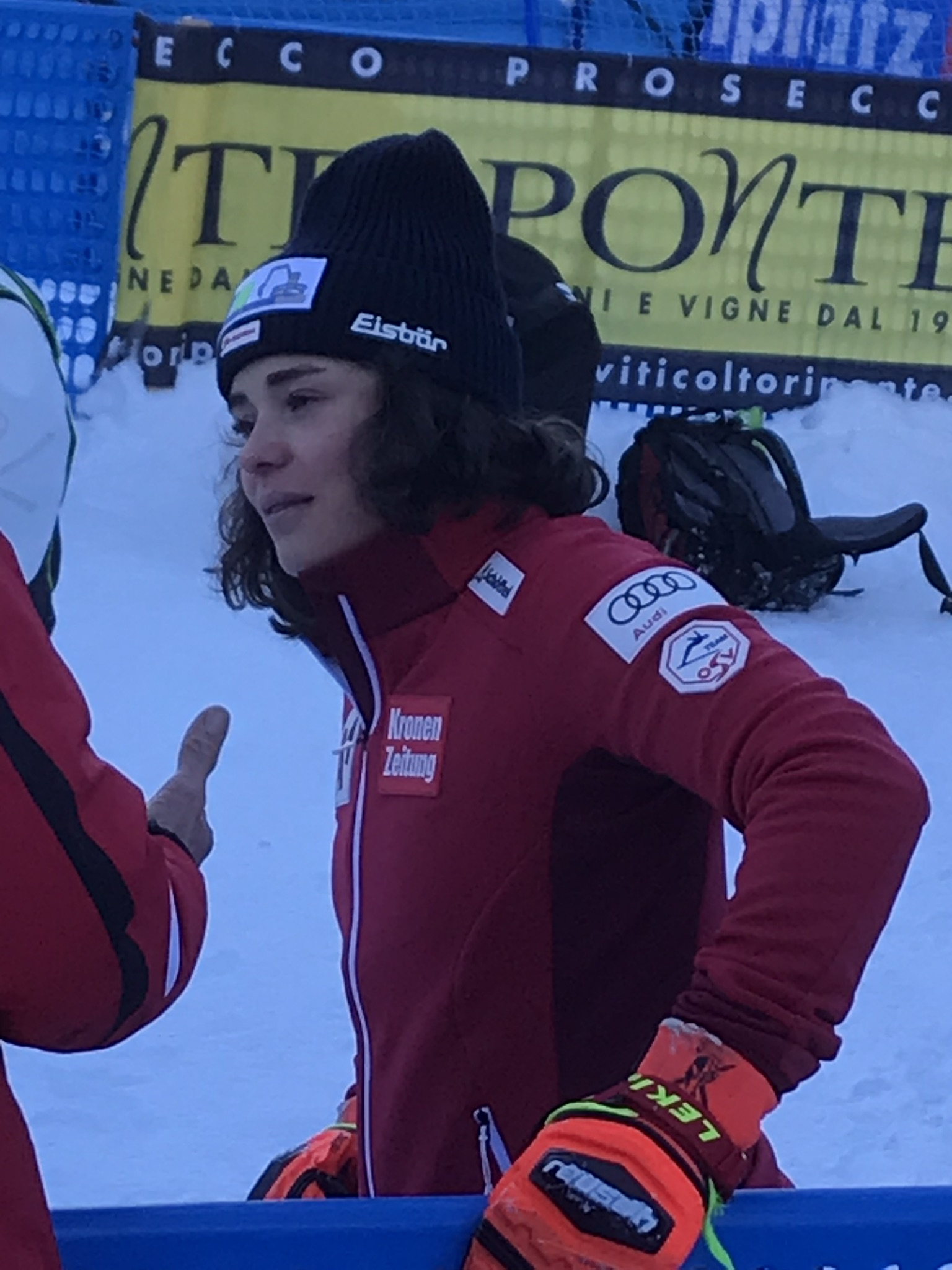
2026 Women's Giant Slalom World Cup: Julia Scheib of Austria, discipline championship for the first time.; 2026 Women's World Cup; Overall • Downhill • Super-G; Giant slalom • Slalom
Previous: 2025	Next: 2027

The women's giant slalom in the 2026 FIS Alpine Skiing World Cup consisted of ten events, including the final. As per the initial schedule released on 12 June 2025, the season began with the traditional opener: a giant slalom on the Rettenbach ski course, located on the Rettenbach glacier in Sölden, Austria, on 25 October 2025. The next three giant slaloms took place in North America in late November and early December, including the first World Cup visit to Copper Mountain (Colorado) for the women since 1999, after which the remainder of the races were held in Europe, including a return to the slopes of Czechia's Špindlerův Mlýn on 24 January 2026 for the first time in three years. In a surprise, Austria's Julia Scheib broke through at 27 years old for her first five World Cup victories, all in this discipline, to clinch the title prior to finals

The season was interrupted for the quadrennial 2026 Winter Olympics in three regions in Italy -- Milan, the Stelvio Pass, and Cortina d'Ampezzo—during 6–22 February 2026. Except for slalom, the Alpine skiing events for women took place on the classic Olimpia delle Tofane course at Cortina d'Ampezzo. The championship in women's giant slalom was held on Sunday, 15 February, and was won by Italy's Federica Brignone, the defending discipline champion who missed virtually all of the season due to injury but was able to overcome pain to carry the flag for her country and compete in her home Olympics.

== Season summary ==
Due to an injury suffered at the end of last season, defending discipline champion Federica Brignone of Italy was considered likely to miss most of, if not all of, the 2025-26 Alpine season. With Brignone on hand for the traditional season-opening race in Sölden, Austria, 27-year-old Austrian skier Julia Scheib, who had finished third in the race last year for her first-ever World Cup individual podium, grabbed a lead of well over a second on the first run and then held on for her first-ever World Cup victory, which also represented the first victory by an Austrian woman in a World Cup giant slalom race since March 2016. In the next race, across the pond in Copper Mountain (U.S.), Scheib almost pulled off a second straight victory (and retained the overall lead in the discipline), but instead New Zealand's Alice Robinson, the first run leader, held form and became the first woman not from Europe or North America to record five World Cup race victories. Remaining in North America for two races at Tremblant (Canada) the next week, the first race saw Robinson pulling off a back-to-back victory by almost a second over Zrinka Ljutić of Croatia, who moved into third place for the season as Robinson took over the discipline lead. The next day, Scheib bounced back (after crashing the first day) to claim her second victory of the season by about half a second, although Robinson (who finished on the podium in third) narrowly retained the discipline lead. In the last giant slalom of the calendar year, though, in Semmering, Austria, Scheib won for the second time this season in front of a home crowd by edging Switzerland's Camille Rast, which enabled her to regain the discipline lead over Robinson, who failed to complete her first run.

In the first race of the new year the following week at Kranjska Gora, Slovenia, Robinson again failed to complete the first run, and Scheib and Rast again battled for the win, except this time Rast came out on top by 0.2 seconds for her first giant slalom victory; Rast, who like all members of the Swiss team wore a black armband during the race, then dedicated her victory to the victims of a New Year's Eve fire in Crans-Montana, a prominent skiing area in her home canton. The day before the next giant slalom at Kronplatz, Italy, on 20 January came another return: Brignone, who said that she had only been training on skis for 13 days after her surgery and recovery but wanted the race to see where she stood physically less than one month before the Olympic Games: "Then we arrived to this conclusion when we said, “OK, it’s maybe good for me to try’". But she did more than "try" at Kronplatz, as her sixth-place finish, the top by an Italian on the home snow, ensured her selection for the Italian Olympic team. In the race, Scheib closed from third after the first run to overtake both Rast and Sweden's Sara Hector, the first-run leader, for her fourth victory of the season and a commanding 138-point lead in the discipline standings. Just a few days later at Špindlerův Mlýn, Czechia, however, Scheib skied out and failed to finish her second run, and Hector maintained her opening-run lead to earn her first win of the season, narrowly edging the two fastest racers on the second run: Americans Paula Moltzan and Mikaela Shiffrin (who earned her first podium in giant slalom in two years; the last was the week before the first of her two serious injuries over those seasons). With only two races left in the discipline for the season (both after the Olympics), the only three people still with a chance to win the season discipline title are Scheib, Rast (89 points behind). and Hector (131 points behind); since a maximum of only 200 points remains, Shiffrin (fourth, 209 points behind) and everyone else are locked out.

At the Winter Olympics, on a relatively flat course in Cortina, the skiers finishing second through ninth were separated by less than 0.2 seconds, but Brignone, making a dream comeback, blew out the field, winning by over 0.6 seconds to improve from a silver medal in the discipline at the 2022 Olympics to a gold now, with 2022 gold medalist Hector and Norway's Thea Louise Stjernesund tying for the silver. However, because of continuing pain from her injuries, Brignone chose to end her season after just two post-Olympic events, hoping that the rest will permit her to heal fully. In the last race before finals at Åre (Sweden), Hector skied out in the first run, but at the end of that run, Rast held a narrow lead over Scheib; however, Rast skied out early in the second run, and Scheib's victory -- her fifth of the World Cup season (and her nine-year career), by .36 seconds over Moltzan -- clinched the discipline title for the season for her.

== Finals ==
The World Cup finals in the discipline are scheduled to take place on Wednesday, 25 March 2026 on the Olympialøypa course at Hafjell, near Lillehammer, Norway. Only the top 25 skiers in the World Cup giant slalom discipline and the winner of the 2026 FIS Junior World Championships in the discipline (Anna Trocker of Italy), plus any skiers who have scored at least 500 points in the World Cup overall classification for the season, will be eligible to compete in the final, and only the top 15 will earn World Cup points. Two 500-plus point skiers (Laura Pirovano of Italy and Kira Weidle-Winkelmann of Germany) have entered, joining 24 of the 25 eligible competitors (all but the injured Maryna Gąsienica-Daniel of Poland) and Trocker, so the final field was set at 27. With Scheib already having clinched the discipline title, the real drama focused on the battle for the overall title in the season's final race between Schiffrin, who entered with an 85-point lead, and Germany's Emma Aicher, who needed to win and have Shiffrin not place in the top 15 to snatch the title. After the first run, this upset looked possible, as Aicher was narrowly behind in third and Shiffrin was only 17th; however, Shiffrin's much better second run put her easily into the top 15 long before Aicher's second run, in which she fell back all the way to twelfth place, just behind Shiffrin, who won her sixth overall title. In the remainder of the race, Canada's Valérie Grenier held the lead after both runs and thus won her third World Cup title ever, with the second and third spots on the discipline's podium respectively going to Rast (sixth in the race) and Hector (fourth).

== Standings ==
	Venue	25 Oct 2025; Sölden	29 Nov 2025; Copper Mountain	6 Dec 2025; Tremblant	7 Dec 2025; Tremblant	27 Dec 2025; Semmering	3 Jan 2026; Kranjska Gora	20 Jan 2026; Kronplatz	24 Jan 2026; Špindlerův Mlýn	15 Feb 2026; Cortina d'Ampezzo	14 Mar 2026; Åre	25 Mar 2026; Hafjell	
#	Skier	(Austria)	(United States)	(Canada)	(Canada)	(Austria)	(Slovenia)	(Italy)	(Czech Republic)	(Italy)	(Sweden)	(Norway)	Total
	(Austria) Julia Scheib	100	80	DNF1	100	100	80	100	DNF2	⑤	100	60	720
2	(Switzerland) Camille Rast	16	45	50	50	80	100	80	50	⑫	DNF2	40	511
3	(Sweden) Sara Hector	29	50	DNF1	80	60	50	60	100	②	DNF1	50	479
4	(United States) Mikaela Shiffrin	50	18	40	50	40	45	50	60	⑪	45	24	422
5	(New Zealand) Alice Robinson	32	100	100	60	DNF1	DNF1	20	DNQ	⑧	60	36	408
6	(United States) Paula Moltzan	80	DNF2	20	40	DNF2	60	32	80	⑮	80	0	392
7	(Canada) Valérie Grenier	24	20	60	DNF1	50	29	29	DNF1	⑬	DNF1	100	312
8	(Norway) Thea Louise Stjernesund	45	60	DNF2	32	29	16	36	6	②	32	16	272
9	(Croatia) Zrinka Ljutić	26	36	80	36	20	9	DNQ	DNF2	⑰	40	20	267
10	(United States) Nina O'Brien	40	24	26	DNF2	DNF1	32	DNF2	45	⑳	16	32	215
11	(Italy) Lara Della Mea	DNF1	4	29	29	36	26	26	36	④	10	0	196
12	(Albania) Lara Colturi	36	22	8	16	DNF2	40	11	22	⑯	36	0	191
13	(Poland) Maryna Gąsienica-Daniel	14	16	18	15	45	36	45	DNF2	⑦	DNS		189
14	(Norway) Mina Fürst Holtmann	10	32	15	14	13	DNF1	DNF1	DNF1	⑥	20	80	184
15	(Canada) Britt Richardson	11	15	16	22	24	22	24	29	㉖	DNF2	0	163
16	(Germany) Lena Dürr	18	40	10	26	26	13	10	9	⑨	5	0	157
17	(Austria) Stephanie Brunner	8	6	24	11	DNF1	10	14	15	DNF2	22	45	155
18	(Germany) Emma Aicher	3	DNQ	22	DNQ	12	DNQ	DNS	26	⑲	50	22	135
19	(Italy) Sofia Goggia	DNF1	14	32	24	32	24	DNF1	DNS	⑩	DNF2	0	126
20	(Switzerland) Vanessa Kasper	2	5	DNQ	12	9	DNQ	18	24	㉓	15	26	111
21	(Italy) Asja Zenere	14	29	DNQ	20	DNQ	DNQ	16	DNF1	⑭	26	0	105
22	(United States) AJ Hurt	20	DNS			10	6	DNF1	32	DNF1	29	0	97
23	(Sweden) Estelle Alphand	DNQ	11	36	DNQ	DNF1	13	12	5	㉗	DNF1	18	95
24	(Austria) Nina Astner	7	8	13	DNQ	22	DNQ	15	20	⑱	DNF1	0	85
25	(Switzerland) Wendy Holdener	1	13	14	7	16	8	DNQ	11	DNS	12	0	82
26	(France) Clara Direz	6	3	45	DNF2	14	DNF1	DNF2	DNQ	DNF1	6	NE	74
27	(Switzerland) Sue Piller	DNQ	DNQ	11	3	DNQ	11	4	40	㉔	4	NE	73
	(Austria) Katharina Liensberger	4	26	7	18	18	DNS					NE	73
29	(Switzerland) Lara Gut-Behrami	60	DNS									NE	60
	(Norway) Madeleine Sylvester-Davik	DNQ	DNQ	9	10	DNQ	20	DNQ	10	㉕	11	NE	60
31	(United States) Elisabeth Bocock	12	DNF1	DNF1	DNF1	DNF1	18	22	DNF1	DNS	DNF1	NE	52
32	(Austria) Franziska Gritsch	DNQ	13	6	DNQ	6	DNQ	13	DNQ	DNS	9	NE	47
33	(Sweden) Hilma Lövblom	DNF1	DNQ	DNF1	13	DNF1	DNQ	8	DNF2	DNS	24	NE	45
34	(Italy) Federica Brignone	DNS						40	DNS	①	DNS	NE	40
35	(Italy) Ilaria Ghisalberti	DNQ	DNQ	5	4	DNQ	3	DNQ	13	DNS	13	NE	38
36	(Canada) Cassidy Gray	DNQ	DNF1	4	DNQ	DNF1	15	DNF1	18	DNF1	DNQ	NE	37
37	(Austria) Ricarda Haaser	DNS				11	7	5	12	DNS	DNS	NE	35
38	(Italy) Anna Trocker	DNS				DNQ	DNF1	DNQ	DNQ	DNS	DNS	32	32
39	(Norway) Kajsa Vickhoff Lie	15	DNF1	DNS		15	DNS			DNF2	DNS		30
40	(Germany) Fabiana Dorigo	DNQ	DNQ	DNF1	8	DNF1	DNQ	6	14	DNS	DNF1	NE	28
41	(Sweden) Hanna Aronsson Elfman	DNQ	10	DNS		DNQ	DNF1	DNQ	16	㉑	DNQ	NE	26
42	(Slovenia) Ana Bucik Jogan	DNQ	7	DNF1	5	9	2	DNQ	DNQ	DNF2	DNS	NE	23
43	(United States) Katie Hensien	22	DNS					DNF1	DNF1	DNS	DNF1	NE	22
44	(France) Doriane Escané	DNF1	DNQ	DNQ	DNF1	DNQ	14	DNQ	7	㉒	DNQ	NE	21
	(Finland) Erika Pykalainen	9	DNQ	12	DNF1	DNF1	DNF1	DNQ	DNQ	DNS	DNS	NE	21
46	(Switzerland) Dania Allenbach	DNS					4	9	DNQ	DNS	7	NE	20
47	(Sweden) Sophie Nyberg	DNS									18	NE	18
48	(Switzerland) Stefanie Grob	DNQ	DNS			DNQ	DNQ	DNQ	DNS		14	NE	14
49	(Austria) Lisa Hörhager	DNF1	9	3	DNQ	DNS				DNF2	DNS	NE	12
	(Italy) Alice Pazzaglia	DNS				4	1	7	DNS		DNQ	NE	12
51	(Austria) Victoria Olivier	DNQ	DNQ	DNQ	9	DNQ	DNS					NE	9
52	(Italy) Laura Pirovano	DNS									8	0	8
	(Italy) Giorgia Collomb	DNQ	DNQ	DNQ	DNQ	DNF2	DNQ	DNF1	8	DNS	DNS	NE	8
54	(Germany) Jana Fritz	DNS				7	DNQ	DNS				NE	7
	(Switzerland) Simone Wild	DNS	DNQ	2	DNQ	DNQ	5	DNQ	DNF1	DNS	DNQ	NE	7
56	(Austria) Viktoria Bürgler	DNQ	DNQ	DNF1	6	DNF1	DNF1	DNS				NE	6
57	(Slovenia) Neja Dvornik	5	DNS									NE	5
	(Canada) Justine Lamontagne	DNF1	DNF1	DNQ	DNF1	5	DNQ	DNQ	DNF1	㉘	DNS	NE	5
59	(France) Camille Cerutti	DNF1	2	DNQ	DNQ	DNF1	DNS			DNF2	DNQ	NE	2
	References												

=== Legend ===
- Winner (100 points)
- 2nd place (80 points)
- 3rd place (60 points)
- DNQ = Did not qualify for run 2
- DNF1 = Did not finish run 1
- DSQ1 = Disqualified run 1
- DNF2 = Did not finish run 2
- DSQ2 = Disqualified run 2
- DNS2 = Did not start run 2
- Did not start (DNS)
- Not eligible for finals (NE)
- Race canceled (x)
- FIS non-World Cup race (Olympics)
- R# = Rescheduled (make-up) race
- Updated at 25 March 2026, after all races.

== See also ==
- 2026 Alpine Skiing World Cup – Women's summary rankings
- 2026 Alpine Skiing World Cup – Women's overall
- 2026 Alpine Skiing World Cup – Women's downhill
- 2026 Alpine Skiing World Cup – Women's super-G
- 2026 Alpine Skiing World Cup – Women's slalom
- World Cup scoring system
