= Giorgia Collomb =

Italian alpine skier

Personal information
- Born: 17 October 2006 (age 19) La Thuile

Skiing career
- Sport: Alpine skiing
- World Cup debut: 23 November 2024 (age 18)

World Championships
- Teams: 1 – (2025)
- Medals: 1 (1 gold)

World Cup
- Seasons: 1 – (2025)
Medal record
Women's alpine skiing
Representing Italy
World Championships
Gold medal – first place	2025 Saalbach	Team event
Youth Olympic Games
Gold medal – first place	2024 Gangwon	Giant slalom
Silver medal – second place	2024 Gangwon	Combined
Bronze medal – third place	2024 Gangwon	Slalom
Junior World Championships
Gold medal – first place	2025 Tarvisio	Giant Slalom

Giorgia Collomb (born 17 October 2006) is an Italian World Cup alpine ski racer. On 4 February 2025, together with Lara Della Mea, Filippo della Vite and Alex Vinatzer, she won the gold medal in the team competition at the World Championships in Saalbach-Hinterglemm.
