= Gallhuber =

Gallhuber is a surname. Notable people with the surname include:

- Katharina Gallhuber (born 1997), Austrian skier
- Philipp Gallhuber (born 1995), Austrian footballer
