= Philipp Gallhuber =

Austrian footballer

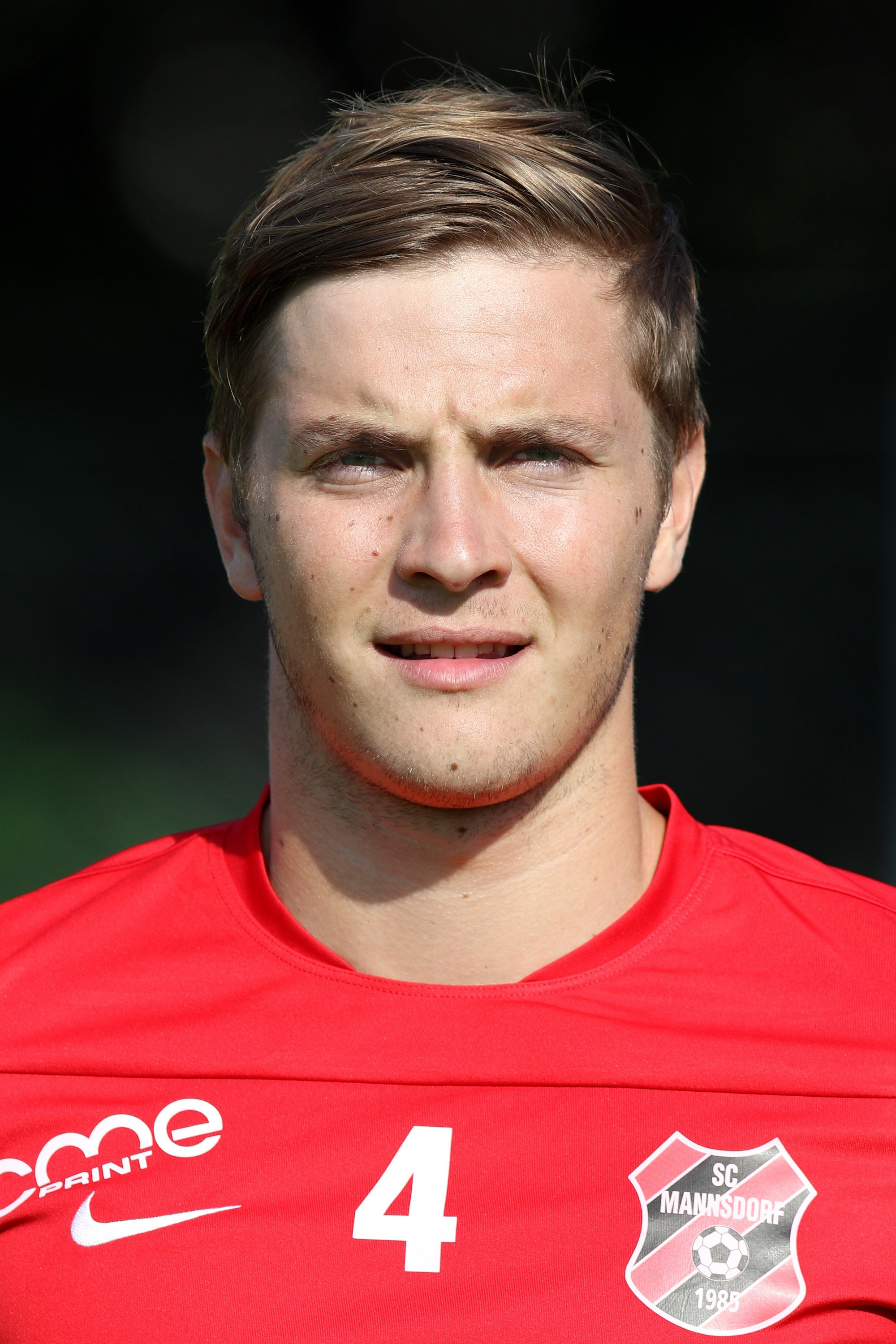
- Gallhuber in 2016

Personal information
- Date of birth: 27 June 1995 (age 31)
- Place of birth: Göstling an der Ybbs, Austria
- Height: 1.83 m (6 ft 0 in)
- Position: Right back

Team information
- Current team: Austria Wien (youth coach)

Youth career
- 2001–2006: FC Göstling/Ybbs
- 2006–2009: SC Wieselburg
- 2009–2014: Admira Wacker

Senior career*
Years	Team	Apps	(Gls)
2014–2015	Admira Wacker II	9	(0)
2015	SC Ritzing	1	(0)
2016	1. SC Sollenau	13	(0)
2016–2017	SC Mannsdorf	16	(2)
2017	Wiener SC	11	(0)
2018–2020	SKU Amstetten	41	(3)

Managerial career
- 2020–: Austria Wien (youth)
- * Club domestic league appearances and goals

Philipp Gallhuber (born 27 June 1995) is an Austrian retired professional footballer who played as a right back and current youth coach at Austria Wien.
