= Anna Swenn-Larsson =

Swedish alpine skier (born 1991)

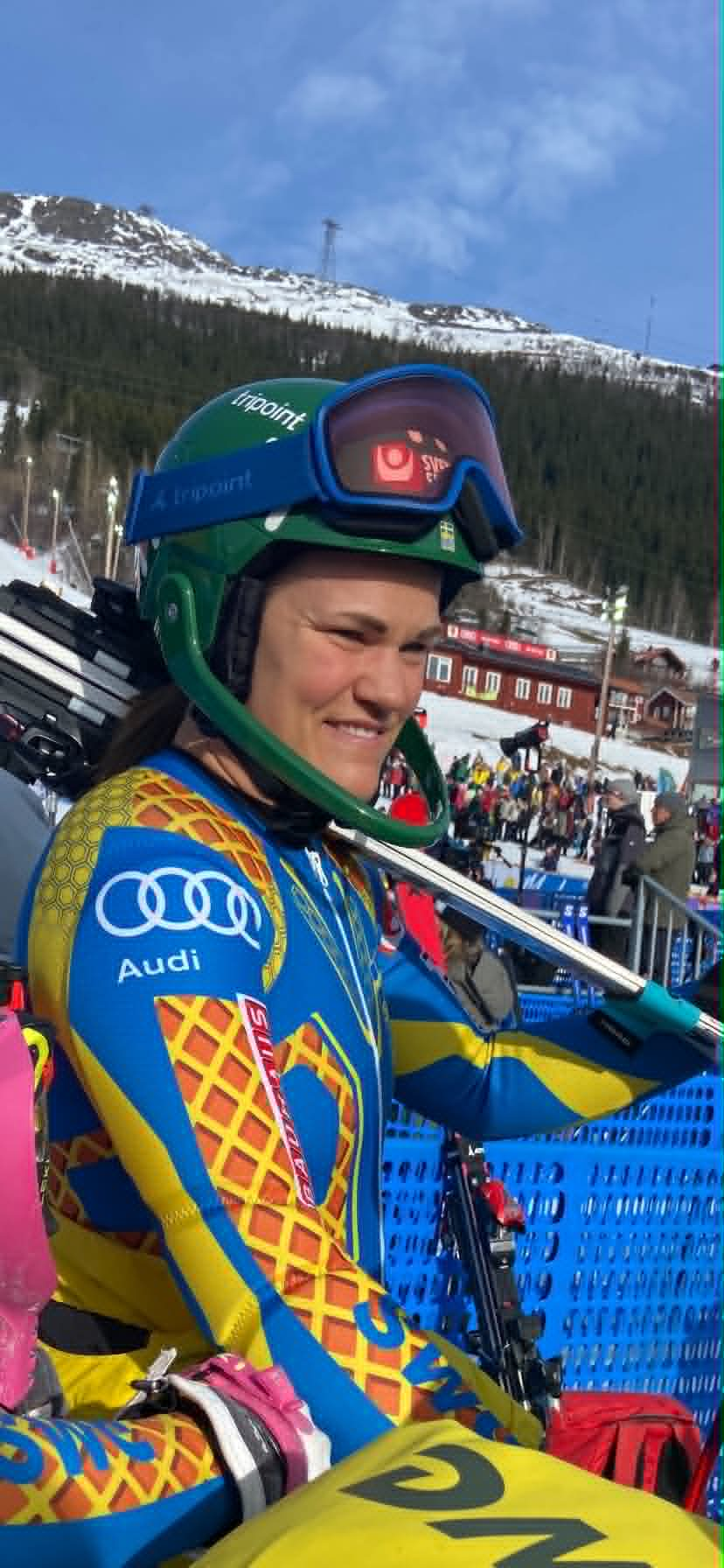
- Swenn-Larsson at the 2026 World Cup slalom in Åre, Sweden

Personal information
- Born: 18 June 1991 (age 35) Mora, Sweden
- Height: 1.79 m (5 ft 10 in)

Skiing career
- Country: Sweden
- Sport: Alpine skiing ♀
- Club: Rättviks SLK
- Disciplines: Slalom
- World Cup debut: 21 December 2010 (age 19)

Olympics
- Teams: 4 – (2014, 2018, 2022, 2026)
- Medals: 1

World Championships
- Teams: 6 – (2013–2019, 2023, 2025)
- Medals: 2 (0 gold)

World Cup
- Seasons: 16 – (2011–2020, 2022–2027)
- Wins: 2 – (2 SL)
- Podiums: 17 – (15 SL, 2 PSL)
- Overall titles: 0 – (11th in 2019)
- Discipline titles: 0 – (4th in SL, 2019)
Medal record
Women's alpine skiing
Representing Sweden
World Cup race podiums
Event	1st	2nd	3rd
Slalom	2	4	9
Parallel	0	1	1
Total	2	5	10
International alpine ski competitions
Event	1st	2nd	3rd
Winter Olympics	0	0	1
World Championships	0	1	1
Total	0	1	2
Olympic Games
Bronze medal – third place	2026 Milano Cortina	Slalom
World Championships
Silver medal – second place	2019 Åre	Slalom
Bronze medal – third place	2015 Beaver Creek	Team event

Grund Anna Swenn-Larsson (born 18 June 1991) is a Swedish World Cup alpine ski racer who specialises in slalom. Swenn-Larsson competed for Sweden in four Winter Olympics and five World Championships. She won a silver medal in slalom at the 2019 World Championships in Åre, and a bronze medal in slalom at the 2026 Winter Olympics in Cortina d'Ampezzo.

She made her World Cup debut in a slalom at Courchevel in December 2010 and placed 26th; her first podium came on home snow at Åre in March 2014.

Her first World Cup victory came in November 2022 in a slalom at Killington, shared with Wendy Holdener.

== World Cup results ==
=== Season standings ===
Season
Season	Age	Overall	Slalom	Giant slalom	Super-G	Downhill	Combined	Parallel
2011	19	122	58	—	—	—	—	—N/a
2012	20	55	21	—	—	—	—	—N/a
2013	21	53	20	—	—	—	—	—N/a
2014	22	39	9	—	—	—	—	—N/a
2015	23	53	20	—	—	—	—	—N/a
2016	24	60	19	—	—	—	—	—N/a
2017	25	94	35	—	—	—	—	—N/a
2018	26	30	9	—	—	—	—	—N/a
2019	27	11	4	—	—	—	—	—N/a
2020	28	18	5	—	—	—	—	4
2021	29	Injured, out for entire season						
2022	30	41	10	—	—	—	—N/a	—
2023	31	18	5	—	—	—	—N/a	—N/a
2024	32	21	5	—	—	—	—N/a	—N/a
2025	33	23	7	—	—	—	—N/a	—N/a
2026	34	30	8	—	—	—	—N/a	—N/a

=== Race podiums ===
- 2 wins – (2 SL)
- 17 podiums – (15 SL, 2 PSL); 71 top tens

Season
Season	Date	Location	Discipline	Place
2014	8 March 2014	Åre, Sweden	Slalom	3rd
2019	2 February 2019	Maribor, Slovenia	Slalom	2nd
2019	19 February 2019	Stockholm, Sweden	Parallel slalom	3rd
2020	1 December 2019	Killington, United States	Slalom	3rd
2020	15 December 2019	St. Moritz, Switzerland	Parallel slalom	2nd
2020	14 January 2020	Flachau, Austria	Slalom	2nd
2022	9 January 2022	Kranjska Gora, Slovenia	Slalom	3rd
2023	19 November 2022	Levi, Finland	Slalom	2nd
2023	27 November 2022	Killington, United States	Slalom	1st
2023	4 January 2023	Zagreb, Croatia	Slalom	3rd
2023	11 March 2023	Åre, Sweden	Slalom	3rd
2024	21 January 2024	Jasná, Slovakia	Slalom	3rd
2024	11 February 2024	Soldeu, Andorra	Slalom	1st
2024	16 March 2024	Saalbach, Austria	Slalom	3rd
2025	1 December 2024	Killington, United States	Slalom	2nd
2025	5 January 2025	Kranjska Gora, Slovenia	Slalom	3rd
2027	21 November 2026	Gurgl, Austria	Slalom	3rd

== World Championship results ==
Year
Year	Age	Slalom	Giant slalom	Super-G	Downhill	Combined	Team; Combined	Parallel	Team; Event
2013	21	23	—	—	—	—	—N/a	—N/a	—
2015	23	22	—	—	—	—	—N/a	—N/a	—
2017	25	16	—	—	—	—	—N/a	—N/a	—
2019	27	2	—	—	—	—	—N/a	—N/a	5
2023	31	DNF2	—	—	—	—	—N/a	—	—
2025	33	DNF1	—	—	—	—N/a	—	—N/a	—

== Olympic results ==
Year
Year	Age	Slalom	Giant slalom	Super-G	Downhill	Combined	Team combined	Team event
2014	22	11	—	—	—	—	—N/a	—N/a
2018	26	5	—	—	—	—	—N/a	5
2022	30	9	—	—	—	—	—N/a	—
2026	34	3	—	—	—	—N/a	—	—N/a
