= Breezy Johnson =

American alpine skier (born 1996)

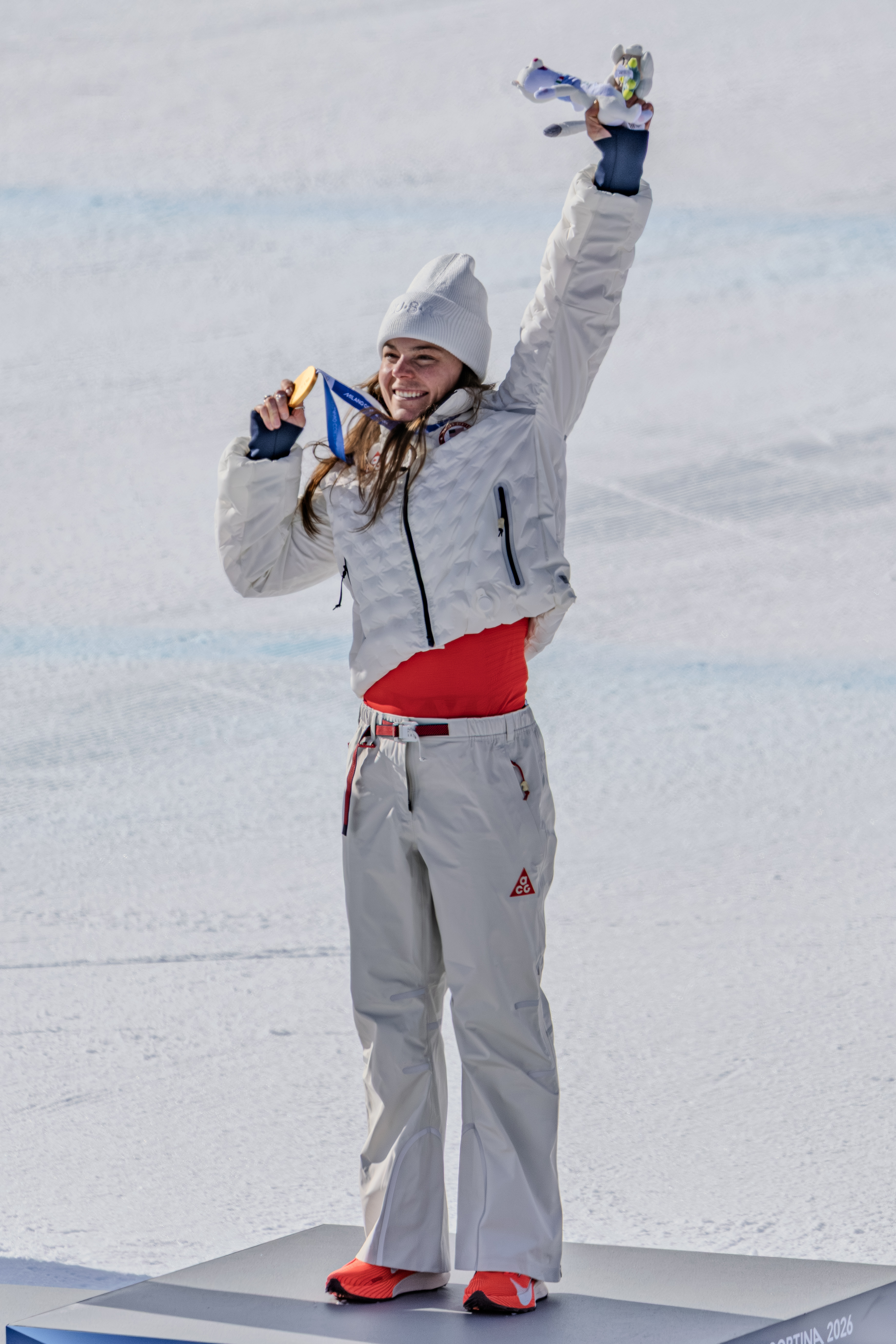
- Olympic gold medalist in 2026 downhill

Personal information
- Born: Breanna Noble Johnson; January 19, 1996 (age 30) Jackson, Wyoming, U.S.
- Height: 5 ft 8 in (173 cm)

Skiing career
- Country: United States
- Sport: Alpine skiing ♀
- Club: Rowmark Ski Academy
- Disciplines: Downhill, Super-G
- World Cup debut: December 4, 2015 (age 19)

Olympics
- Teams: 2 – (2018, 2026)
- Medals: 1 (1 gold)

World Championships
- Teams: 4 – (2017, 2021, 2023, 2025)
- Medals: 2 (2 gold)

World Cup
- Seasons: 9 – (2016–2018, 2020–2023, 2025–2026)
- Wins: 0
- Podiums: 11 – (10 DH, 1 SG)
- Overall titles: 0 – (16th in 2026)
- Discipline titles: 0 – (3rd in DH, 2026)
Medal record
Women's alpine skiing
Representing the United States
World Cup race podiums
Event	1st	2nd	3rd
Super-G	0	0	1
Downhill	0	4	6
Total	0	4	7
International competitions
Event	1st	2nd	3rd
Olympic Games	1	0	0
World Championships	2	0	0
Total	3	0	0
Olympic Games
Gold medal – first place	2026 Milano Cortina	Downhill
World Championships
Gold medal – first place	2025 Saalbach	Downhill
Gold medal – first place	2025 Saalbach	Team combined

Breezy Noble Johnson (born January 19, 1996) is an American World Cup alpine ski racer on the U.S. Ski Team. She competes in the speed events of downhill and super-G. A two-time Olympian, she won a gold medal at the 2026 Milano Cortina Games.

== Life and career ==
Born in Jackson, Wyoming, Johnson grew up in nearby Victor, Idaho, and made her World Cup debut in December 2015. She attended Western Washington University in Bellingham, Washington, where she pursued a degree in English. In her first World Cup season in 2017, she finished 18th in the downhill standings. At the World Cup finals in March at Aspen, Johnson crashed in the downhill and suffered a tibial plateau fracture to her left leg. Johnson quickly recovered from this injury and in the 2018 season finished 11th in the downhill standings and competed in the Winter Olympics, finishing seventh in the downhill and fourteenth in the super-G.

While training in Chile in September 2018, Johnson partially tore her right anterior cruciate ligament (ACL) and missed the 2019 season. After returning to snow, she tore her left posterior cruciate ligament (PCL) and medial collateral ligament (MCL) in her left knee in training in June 2019.

She returned to the World Cup circuit in January 2020 with a 25th in the downhill at Altenmarkt and consecutive top tens at Bansko. Her first World Cup podium came in December 2020 at a downhill in Val d'Isère, France. She qualified to represent the United States at the 2022 Winter Olympics, but injured her knee in January 2022 and did not compete.

Johnson served a 14-month competition ban issued by the United States Anti-Doping Agency from October 2023 to December 2024 for an anti-doping rule violation after missing three tests during a 12-month period ("Whereabouts Failures"). At the 2025 World Championships, she won the gold medals in downhill and team combined. That was the inaugural race of the team combined, where Johnson skied the downhill and Mikaela Shiffrin skied the slalom. At the Toyota U.S. Alpine Championships, Johnson was awarded with the 2025 Stifel Alpine Best Comeback (Women) award.

=== 2026 Winter Olympics ===
Johnson won the women's downhill at the 2026 Winter Olympics at the Olimpia delle Tofane in Cortina d'Ampezzo, earning the United States' first medal for the games with a time of 1:36.10. She is the second American athlete to win gold in this event, following Lindsey Vonn in 2010. While celebrating her victory after the medal was placed on her neck, the medal broke.

== World Cup results ==
=== Season standings ===
Season
Season	Age	Overall	Slalom	Giant slalom	Super-G	Downhill	Combined
2016	20	125	—	—	—	50	—
2017	21	53	—	—	36	18	—
2018	22	39	—	—	44	11	—
2019	23	Injured in summer: out for entire season					
2020	24	38	—	—	41	20	30
2021	25	17	—	—	30	4	—N/a
2022 (Note: Season-ending injury in January 2022)	26	28	—	—	24	9	—N/a
2023	27	35	—	—	38	11	—N/a
2024	28	Suspension					—N/a
2025	29	39	—	—	33	7	—N/a
2026	30	16	—	—	21	3rd place, bronze medalist(s)	—N/a

=== Race podiums ===
- 0 wins
- 11 podiums (10 DH, 1 SG), 36 top tens

Season
Season	Date	Location	Discipline	Place
2021	December 18, 2020	Val d'Isère, France	Downhill	3rd
2021	December 19, 2020	Val d'Isère, France	Downhill	3rd
2021	January 9, 2021	St Anton, Austria	Downhill	3rd
2021	January 22, 2021	Crans-Montana, Switzerland	Downhill	3rd
2022	December 4, 2021	Lake Louise, Canada	Downhill	2nd
2022	December 4, 2021	Lake Louise, Canada	Downhill	2nd
2022	December 18, 2021	Val d'Isère, France	Downhill	2nd
2025	February 28, 2025	Kvitfjell, Norway	Downhill	3rd
2026	January 31, 2026	Crans-Montana, Switzerland	Super-G	3rd
2026	March 6, 2026	Val di Fassa, Italy	Downhill	3rd
2026	March 21, 2026	Kvitfjell, Norway	Downhill	2nd

== World Championship results ==
Year
Year	Age	Slalom	Giant slalom	Super-G	Downhill	Combined	Team combined
2017	21	—	—	28	15	DNS1	—N/a
2019	23	injured prior to season					—N/a
2021	25	—	—	15	9	DNF1	—N/a
2023	27	—	—	28	DNF	DNF1	—N/a
2025	29	—	—	19	1	—N/a	1

== Olympic results ==
Year
Year	Age	Slalom	Giant slalom	Super-G	Downhill	Combined	Team combined
2018	22	—	—	14	7	—	—N/a
2022	26	Injured, did not compete					—N/a
2026	30	—	—	DNF	1	—N/a	4

== Personal life ==
Shortly before she finished high school, Johnson's parents legally changed her first name from Breanna to Breezy to match her nickname. She came out as bisexual in 2022. Johnson became engaged to construction professional Connor Watkins on February 12, 2026, on the ski slopes after completing her final event at the 2026 Winter Olympics. Johnson and Watkins met on dating app Bumble, and the box for her engagement ring featured a quote by singer Taylor Swift's song "The Alchemy": "Honestly, who are we to fight the alchemy."
