= Tamara Tippler =

Austrian alpine skier

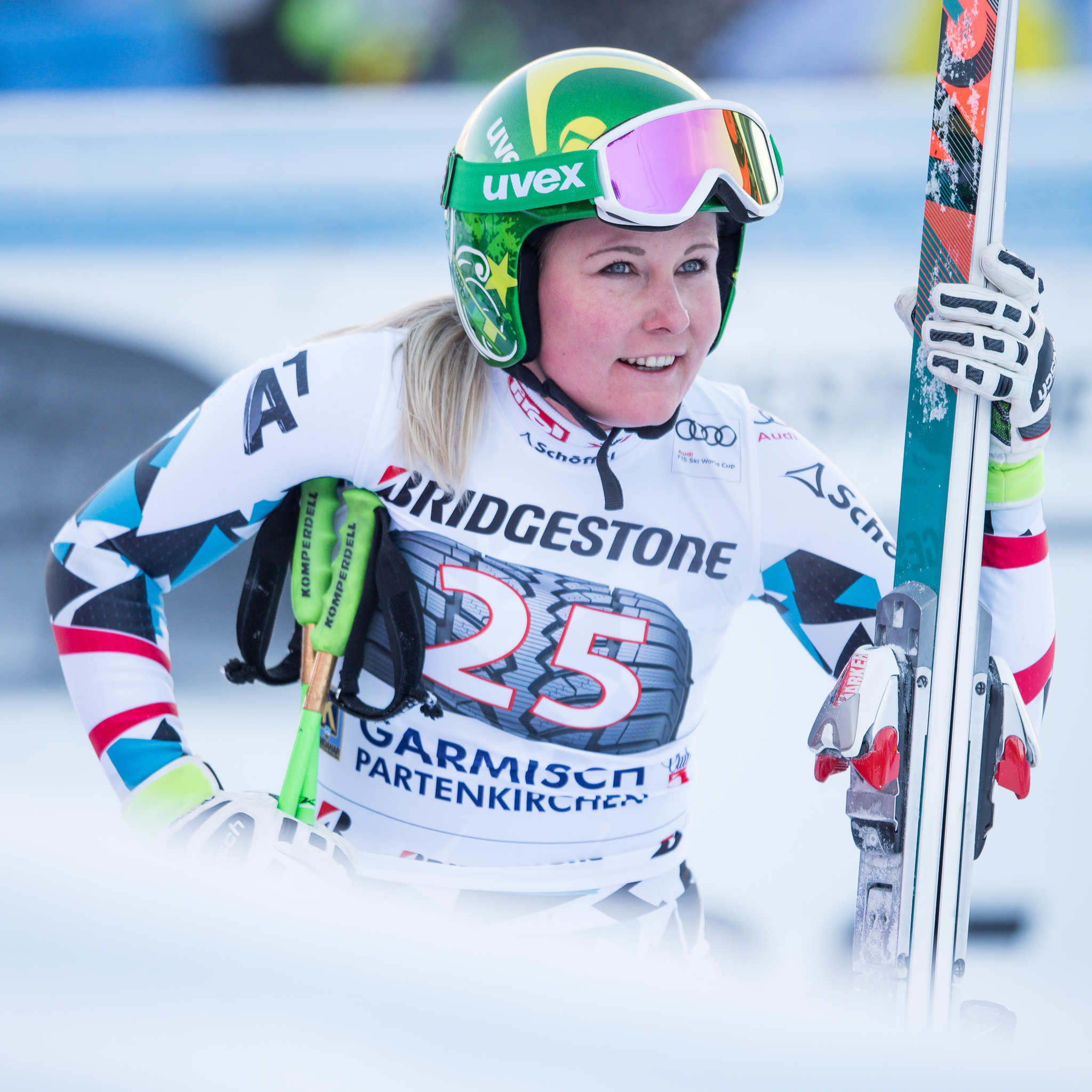
- January 2017

Personal information
- Born: 9 April 1991 (age 35) Rottenmann, Styria, Austria
- Height: 1.68 m (5 ft 6 in)
- Website: tamara-tippler.at

Skiing career
- Sport: Alpine skiing
- Club: SV Union; Mautern - Steiermark
- Disciplines: Super-G, Downhill
- World Cup debut: 2 December 2011 (age 20)

Olympics
- Teams: 2 – (2018, 2022)
- Medals: 0

World Championships
- Teams: 3 – (2019, 2021, 2023)
- Medals: 0

World Cup
- Seasons: 12 – (2012–2023)
- Wins: 0
- Podiums: 10 – (1 DH, 9 SG)
- Overall titles: 0 – (11th in 2021)
- Discipline titles: 0 – (4th in SG, 2021)

Tamara Tippler (born 9 April 1991) is an Austrian World Cup alpine ski racer, and specializes in the speed events of super-G and downhill. She made her World Cup debut in December 2011 in Lake Louise, Canada, and attained her first World Cup podium in December 2015, a second place in super-G, also at Lake Louise.

== World Cup results ==
=== Season standings ===
Season
Season	Age	Overall	Slalom	Giant slalom	Super-G	Downhill	Combined
2013	21	111	—	—	—	—	36
2014	22	106	—	—	—	45	—
2015	23	97	—	—	39	—	—
2016	24	30	—	—	7	27	—
2017	25	60	—	—	45	19	—
2018	26	41	—	—	16	30	—
2019	27	26	—	—	6	17	—
2020	28	30	—	—	18	21	—
2021	29	11	—	—	4	7	—N/a
2022	30	21	—	—	7	24	—N/a
2023	31	39	—	—	19	19	—N/a

Standings through 5 February 2023

=== Race podiums ===
- 10 podiums – (1 DH, 9 SG); 29 top tens

Season
Season	Date	Location	Discipline	Place
2016	6 December 2015	Lake Louise, Canada	Super-G	2nd
2016	27 February 2016	Soldeu, Andorra	Super-G	3rd
2016	12 March 2016	Lenzerheide, Switzerland	Super-G	3rd
2019	20 January 2019	Cortina d'Ampezzo, Italy	Super-G	3rd
2019	14 March 2019	Soldeu, Andorra	Super-G	2nd
2021	9 January 2021	St. Anton, Austria	Downhill	2nd
2021	24 January 2021	Crans-Montana, Switzerland	Super-G	2nd
2021	1 February 2021	Garmisch-Partenkirchen, Germany	Super-G	3rd
2022	22 January 2022	Cortina d'Ampezzo, Italy	Super-G	2nd
2022	30 January 2022	Garmisch-Partenkirchen, Germany	Super-G	3rd

== World Championship results ==
Year
Year	Age	Slalom	Giant slalom	Super-G	Downhill	Combined
2019	27	—	—	12	9	—
2021	29	—	—	7	7	—
2023	31	—	—	21		—

== Olympic results ==
Year
Year	Age	Slalom	Giant slalom	Super-G	Downhill	Combined
2018	26	—	—	21	—	—
2022	30	—	—	4	19	—
