= Jacqueline Wiles =

American alpine skier (born 1992)

Jackie Wiles
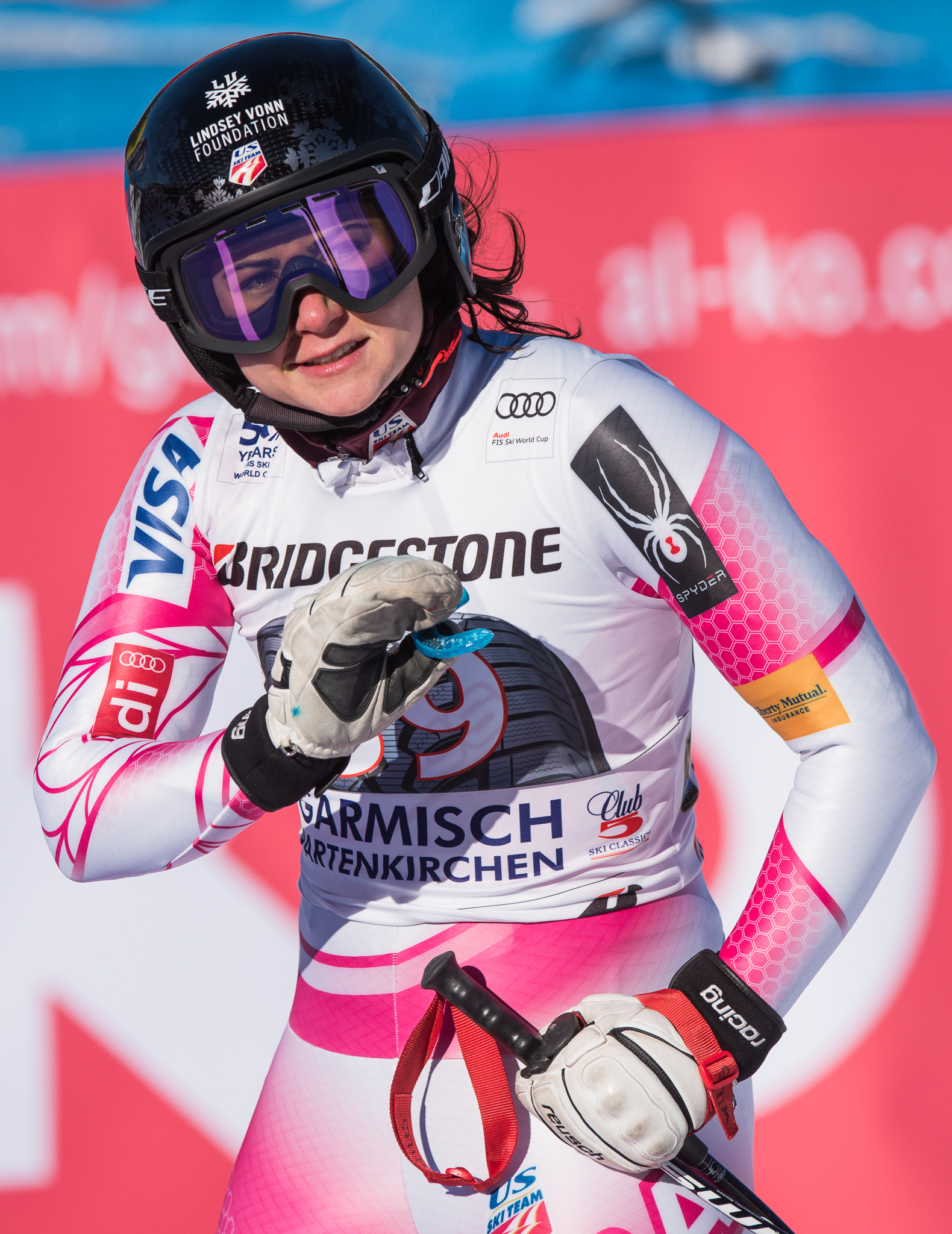
- Wiles at Garmisch in January 2017

Personal information
- Full name: Jacqueline Wiles
- Born: July 13, 1992 (age 34) Portland, Oregon, U.S.
- Height: 5 ft 7 in (1.69 m)
- Website: jacquelinewiles.com

Skiing career
- Country: United States
- Sport: Alpine skiing ♀
- Club: White Pass (WA) Ski Club
- Disciplines: Downhill, Super-G, Combined
- World Cup debut: November 29, 2013 (age 21)

Olympics
- Teams: 3 – (2014, 2022, 2026)
- Medals: 1 (0 gold)

World Championships
- Teams: 4 – (2015, 2017, 2021, 2025)
- Medals: 0

World Cup
- Seasons: 12 – (2014–2018, 2020–2026)
- Wins: 0
- Podiums: 4 – (4 DH)
- Overall titles: 0 – (45th in 2017)
- Discipline titles: 0 – (13th in DH, 2025)
Medal record
Women's alpine skiing
Representing the United States
Olympic Games
Bronze medal – third place	2026 Milano Cortina	Team combined

Jacqueline Wiles (born July 13, 1992), known as Jackie, is an American World Cup alpine ski racer. Born in Portland, Oregon, she specializes in the speed events of downhill and super-G.

A graduate of Canby High School, Wiles made her World Cup debut in November 2013 and gained her first podium in January 2017 in downhill at Altenmarkt-Zauchensee. She has competed for the U.S. in three Winter Olympics (2014, 2022, 2026), and four World Championships.

== World Cup results ==
=== Season standings ===
Season
Season	Age	Overall	Slalom	Giant slalom	Super-G	Downhill	Combined
2014	21	96	—	—	48	38	—
2015	22	97	—	—	59	40	26
2016	23	78	—	—	54	28	43
2017	24	45	—	—	32	14	—
2018	25	46	—	—	36	17	—
2019	26	injured - out for season					
2020	27	116	—	—	—	48	—
2021	28	95	—	—	—	35	—N/a
2022	29	82	—	—	53	30	—N/a
2023	30	—	—	—	—	—	—N/a
2024	31	47	—	—	49	14	—N/a
2025	32	49	—	—	42	13	—N/a
2026	33	35	—	—	33	13	—N/a

=== Top-ten results ===
- 0 wins
- 4 podiums – (4 DH), 10 top tens (9 DH, 1 SG)

Season
Season	Date	Location	Discipline	Place
2017	December 4, 2016	Lake Louise, Canada	Super-G	10th
2017	January 15, 2017	Zauchensee, Austria	Downhill	3rd
2018	December 1, 2017	Lake Louise, Canada	Downhill	5th
2018	January 19, 2018	Cortina d'Ampezzo, Italy	Downhill	7th
2018	January 20, 2018	Cortina d'Ampezzo, Italy	Downhill	3rd
2024	January 27, 2024	Cortina d'Ampezzo, Italy	Downhill	2nd
2025	January 18, 2025	Cortina d'Ampezzo, Italy	Downhill	7th
2025	February 28, 2025	Kvitfjell, Norway	Downhill	8th
2026	January 10, 2026	Zauchensee, Austria	Downhill	3rd
2026	February 27, 2026	Soldeu, Andorra	Downhill	8th

== World Championship results ==
Year
Year	Age	Slalom	Giant slalom	Super-G	Downhill	Combined	Team combined
2015	22	—	—	—	—	17	—N/a
2017	24	—	—	DNF	12	—	—N/a
2021	28	—	—	32	24	—	—N/a
2025	32	—	—	—	DNF	—N/a	10

== Olympic results ==
Year
Year	Age	Slalom	Giant slalom	Super-G	Downhill	Combined	Team combined
2014	21	—	—	—	26	—	—N/a
2018	25	injured the week before Olympics					—N/a
2022	29	—	—	—	21	—	—N/a
2026	33	—	—	13	4	—N/a	3
