= Leona Popović =

Croatian alpine skier (born 1997)

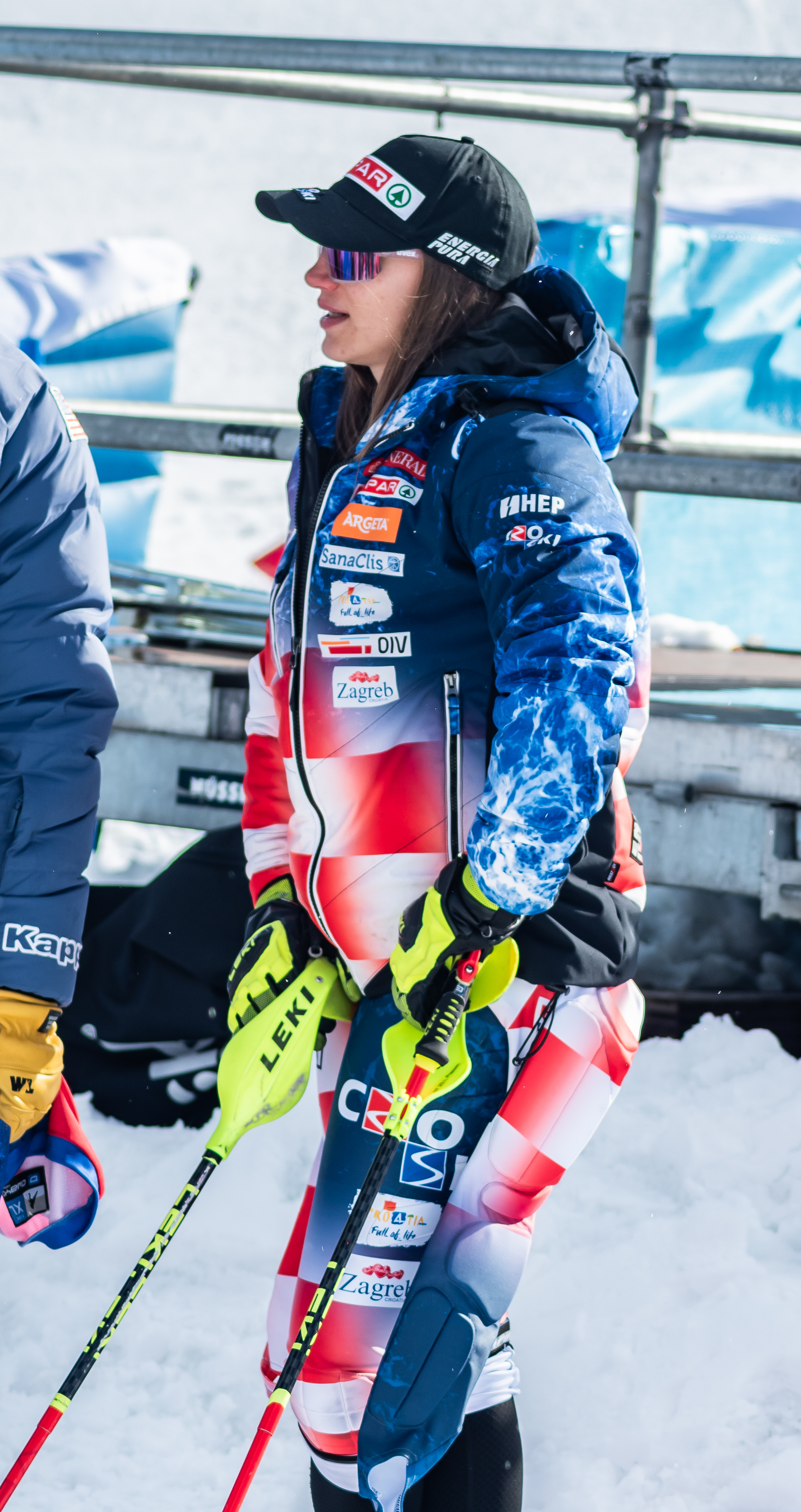
- At Soldeu in February 2024

Personal information
- Born: 13 November 1997 (age 28) Rijeka, Croatia

Skiing career
- Country: Croatia
- Sport: Alpine skiing
- Club: SK Rijeka
- Disciplines: Slalom, giant slalom, combined
- World Cup debut: 4 January 2015 (age 17)

Olympics
- Teams: 3 – (2018, 2022, 2026)
- Medals: 0

World Championships
- Teams: 4 – (2015, 2017, 2021, 2023)
- Medals: 0

World Cup
- Seasons: 11 – (2015–2018, 2020–2026)
- Wins: 0
- Podiums: 2 – (2 SL)
- Overall titles: 0 – (27th in 2023)
- Discipline titles: 0 – (6th in SL, 2023)

Leona Popović (Croatian pronunciation: [pǒpoʋitɕ]; born 13 November 1997) is a Croatian alpine ski racer. Previously, she competed in all winter disciplines, but now specialises in slalom. Her best World Cup finish is 2nd place in slalom.

Popović's first major competition was the 2015 World Championships in Beaver Creek, USA, where she competed in all disciplines at age seventeen; her best result was 27th in slalom. By her 22nd birthday, she had incurred three surgeries on her left leg. In 2015, she broke her tibia while training slalom, and two surgeries were required in 2018 to fix torn knee ligaments (ACL and MCL) sustained in a crash at the Olympics in the second run of the giant slalom.

== World Cup results ==
=== Season standings ===
Season
Season	Age	Overall	Slalom	Giant slalom	Super-G	Downhill	Combined
2017	19	92	—	—	—	—	23
2018	20	105	—	43	—	—	33
2019	21	injured, did not compete					
2020	22	117	48	—	—	—	—
2021	23	87	36	—	—	—	—N/a
2022	24	51	14	—	—	—	—N/a
2023	25	27	6	—	—	—	—N/a
2024	26	50	15	—	—	—	—N/a
2025	27	91	38	—	—	—	—N/a
2026	28	115	49	—	—	—	—N/a

Standings through 31 January 2026

=== Race podiums ===
- 0 wins
- 2 podiums (2 SL); 13 top tens (13 SL)

Season
Season	Date	Location	Discipline	Place
2023	18 Mar 2023	Soldeu, Andorra	Slalom	2nd
2024	12 Nov 2023	Levi, Finland	Slalom	2nd

=== Results per discipline ===
Discipline	WC starts	WC Top 30	WC Top 15	WC Top 5	WC Podium	Best result		
Discipline	WC starts	WC Top 30	WC Top 15	WC Top 5	WC Podium	Date	Location	Place
Slalom	63	33	18	3	2	18 March 2023 and 12 Nov 2023	Soldeu, Andorra and Levi, Finland	2nd
Giant slalom	25	1	0	0	0	27 January 2018	Lenzerheide, Switzerland	23rd
Super-G	3	0	0	0	0	9 December 2017	St. Moritz, Switzerland	53rd
Downhill	0	0	0	0	0			
Combined	4	3	0	0	0	26 February 2017	Crans-Montana, Switzerland	17th
Total	95	37	18	3	2			

Standings through 31 January 2026

== World Championship results ==
Year
Year	Age	Slalom	Giant slalom	Super-G	Downhill	Combined	Parallel	Team event
2015	17	27	37	30	36	DNF1	—N/a	—
2017	19	DNF1	DNF2	DNF	—	DNF2	—N/a	9
2019	21	injured, did not compete						
2021	23	21	25	—	—	—	—	—
2023	25	17	—	—	—	—	—	—
2025	27	injured, did not compete						

== Olympic results ==
Year
Year	Age	Slalom	Giant slalom	Super-G	Downhill	Combined	Team combined	Team event
2018	20	—	DNF1	—	—	—	—N/a	—
2022	24	23	—	—	—	—	—N/a	—
2026	28	DSQ2	—	—	—	—N/a	—	—N/a
