= Stephanie Brunner =

Austrian alpine skier (born 1994)

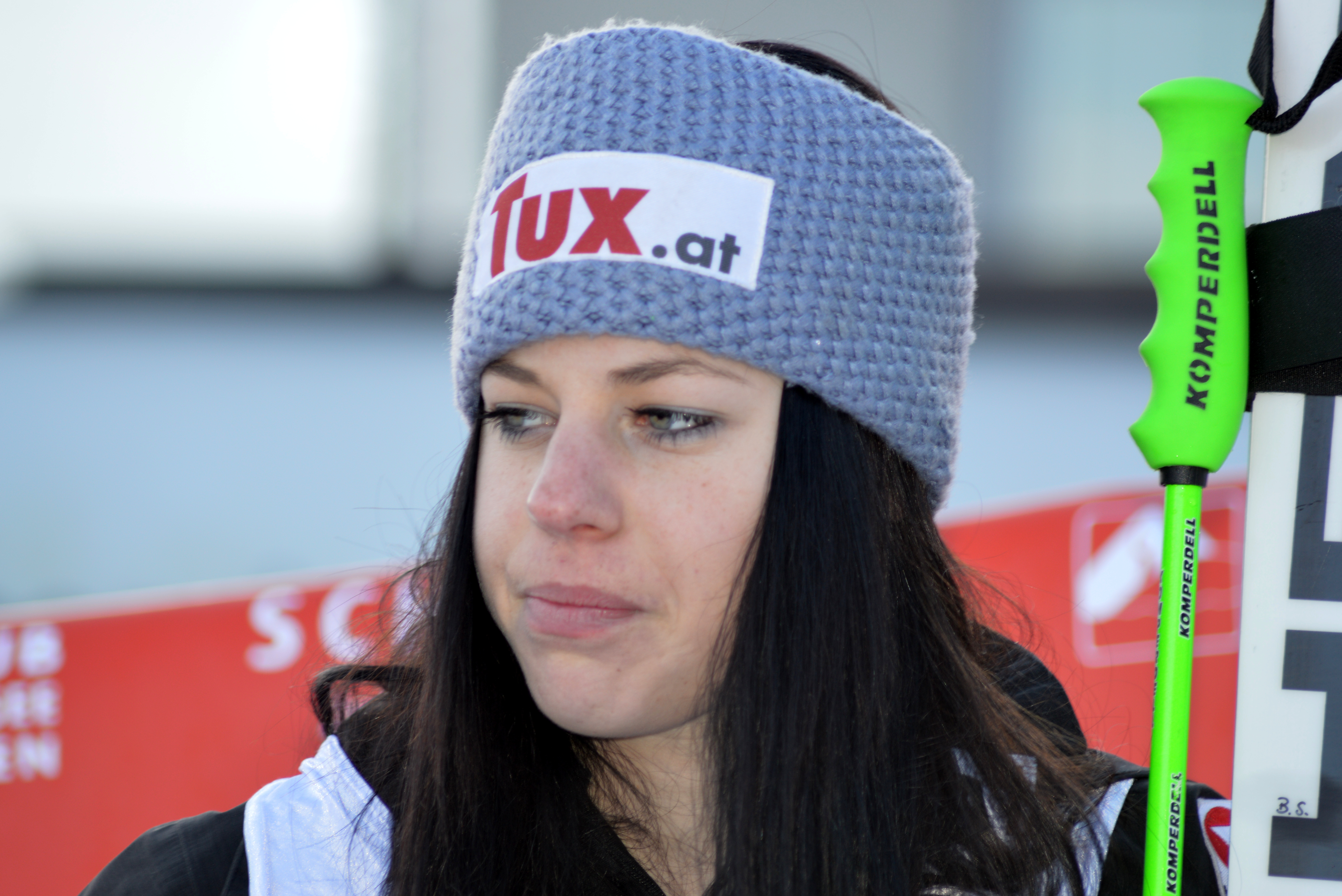
- January 2015

Personal information
- Born: 20 February 1994 (age 32) Schwaz, Tyrol, Austria
- Website: stephanie-brunner.at

Skiing career
- Country: Austria
- Sport: Alpine skiing
- Club: WSV Hippach
- Disciplines: Slalom, giant slalom
- World Cup debut: 17 March 2012 (age 18)

Olympics
- Teams: 3 – (2018, 2022, 2026)
- Medals: 1 (0 gold)

World Championships
- Teams: 3 – (2017, 2021, 2025)
- Medals: 0

World Cup
- Seasons: 14 – (2012, 2014–2026)
- Wins: 0
- Podiums: 1 – (1 GS)
- Overall titles: 0 – (21st in 2018)
- Discipline titles: 0 – (6th in GS, 2018)
Medal record
Women's alpine skiing
Representing Austria
Olympic Games
Silver medal – second place	2018 Pyeongchang	Team event
World Junior Ski Championships
Gold medal – first place	2013 Roccaraso	Slalom
Silver medal – second place	2015 Hafjell	Giant slalom
Silver medal – second place	2015 Hafjell	Team

Stephanie Brunner (born 20 February 1994) is an Austrian World Cup alpine ski racer. Born in Schwaz, Tyrol, she specializes in the technical events of slalom and giant slalom, and made her World Cup debut on 17 March 2012. On the European Cup circuit, Brunner won the 2016 season title in giant slalom and was second in the overall standings. She has represented Austria at multiple Winter Olympics and World Championships.

== World Cup results ==
=== Season standings ===
Season
Season	Age	Overall	Slalom	Giant slalom	Super-G	Downhill	Combined	Parallel
2012	17	117	56	—	—	—	—	—N/a
2013	18	did not compete						—N/a
2014	19	no World Cup points earned						—N/a
2015	20	no World Cup points earned						—N/a
2016	21	55	—	20	—	—	22	—N/a
2017	22	35	38	12	52	—	16	—N/a
2018	23	21	28	6	—	26	11	—N/a
2019	24	33	29	8	—	—	—	—N/a
2020	25	—	—	—	—	—	—	—
2021	26	47	—	15	—	—	—N/a	—
2022	27	58	—	24	—	—	—N/a	9
2023	28	62	—	23	—	—	—N/a	—N/a
2024	29	49	57	18	50	—	—N/a	—N/a
2025	30	56	—	20	49	—	—N/a	—N/a
2026	31	46	—	17	40	—	—N/a	—N/a

=== Race podiums ===
- 0 wins
- 1 podium – (1 GS); 28 top tens

Season
Season	Date	Location	Discipline	Place
2019	24 November 2018	Killington, United States	Giant slalom	3rd

== World Championship results ==
Year
Year	Age	Slalom	Giant slalom	Super-G	Downhill	Combined	Team combined	Parallel	Team event
2017	22	—	5	—	—	—	—N/a	—N/a	5
2021	26	—	DNF2	—	—	—	—N/a	14	5
2025	30	—	—	18	—	—N/a	—	—N/a	6

== Olympic results ==
Year
Year	Age	Slalom	Giant slalom	Super-G	Downhill	Combined	Team combined	Team event
2018	23	DNF1	DNF2	—	—	—	—N/a	2
2022	27	—	DNF1	—	—	—	—N/a	—
2026	31	—	DNF2	—	—	—N/a	—	—N/a
