= Ana Bucik Jogan =

Slovenian alpine skier (born 1993)

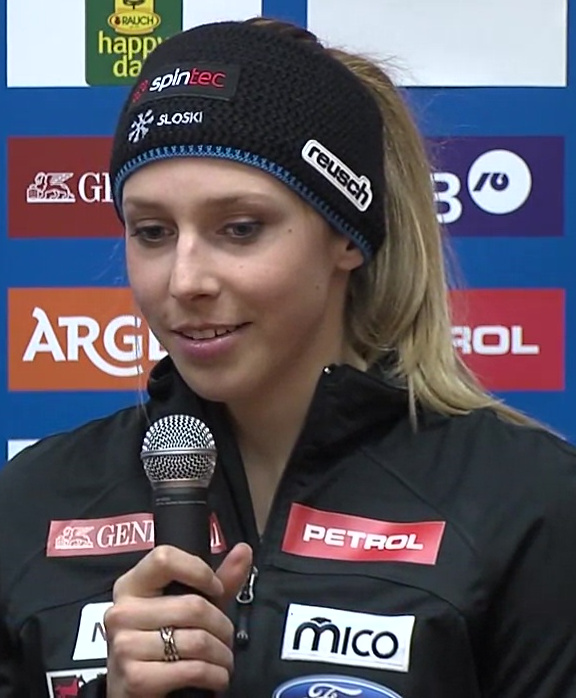
- January 2015

Personal information
- Born: Ana Bucik; 21 July 1993 (age 33) Nova Gorica, Slovenia

Skiing career
- Country: Slovenia
- Sport: Alpine skiing ♀
- Club: GOR - SK Gorica
- Retired: 15 March 2026 (age 32)
- Disciplines: Slalom, giant slalom, combined
- World Cup debut: 16 January 2010 (age 16)

Olympics
- Teams: 3 – (2018, 2022, 2026)
- Medals: 0

World Championships
- Teams: 7 – (2013–2025)
- Medals: 0

World Cup
- Seasons: 15 – (2010, 2013–2026)
- Wins: 0
- Podiums: 1 – (1 AC)
- Overall titles: 0 – (21st in 2023)
- Discipline titles: 0 – (5th in AC, 2018)

Ana Bucik Jogan (born 21 July 1993) is a Slovenian former World Cup alpine ski racer.

Bucik Jogan has competed in three Winter Olympics and seven World Championships and her best result is seventh in the slalom in 2017. She made her World Cup debut at age sixteen in January 2010 and her first podium came in a super-combined in January 2018. Her previous best result was in Slovenia at Maribor in January 2017 with seventh place in the slalom and the best time in the second run. In January 2026 she announced that she would retire at the end of the World Cup season.

== World Cup results ==
=== Season standings ===
Season
Season	Age	Overall	Slalom	Giant slalom	Super-G	Downhill	Combined	Parallel
2015	21	89	44	—	—	—	23	—N/a
2016	22	77	30	—	—	—	47	—N/a
2017	23	52	17	50	—	—	52	—N/a
2018	24	42	22	40	—	—	5	—N/a
2019	25	91	42	—	—	—	—	—N/a
2020	26	55	30	26	—	—	—	17
2021	27	33	14	21	—	—	—N/a	—
2022	28	25	6	23	—	—	—N/a	—
2023	29	21	8	14	—	—	—N/a	—N/a
2024	30	52	28	26	—	—	—N/a	—N/a
2025	31	48	27	24	—	—	—N/a	—N/a
2026	32	66	26	41	—	—	—N/a	—N/a

=== Race podiums ===
- 0 wins
- 1 podium – (1 AC); 22 top tens

Season
Season	Date	Location	Discipline	Place
2018	26 January 2018	Lenzerheide, Switzerland	Combined	3rd

== World Championships results ==
Year
Year	Age	Slalom	Giant slalom	Super-G	Downhill	Combined	Team combined	Parallel	Team event
2013	19	31	—	—	—	—	—N/a	—N/a	—
2015	21	DNF2	—	—	—	11	—N/a	—N/a	—
2017	23	7	—	—	—	DNF2	—N/a	—N/a	9
2019	25	DNF2	31	—	—	—	—N/a	—N/a	9
2021	27	9	DNF1	—	—	—	—N/a	—	11
2023	29	9	25	—	—	—	—N/a	—	—
2025	31	18	24	—	—	—N/a	—	—N/a	—

== Olympic results ==
Year
Year	Age	Slalom	Giant slalom	Super-G	Downhill	Combined	Team combined
2018	24	24	21	—	—	11	—N/a
2022	28	11	11	—	—	—	—N/a
2026	32	24	DNF2	—	—	—N/a	DNF2
