= Elena Curtoni =

Italian alpine skier (born 1991)

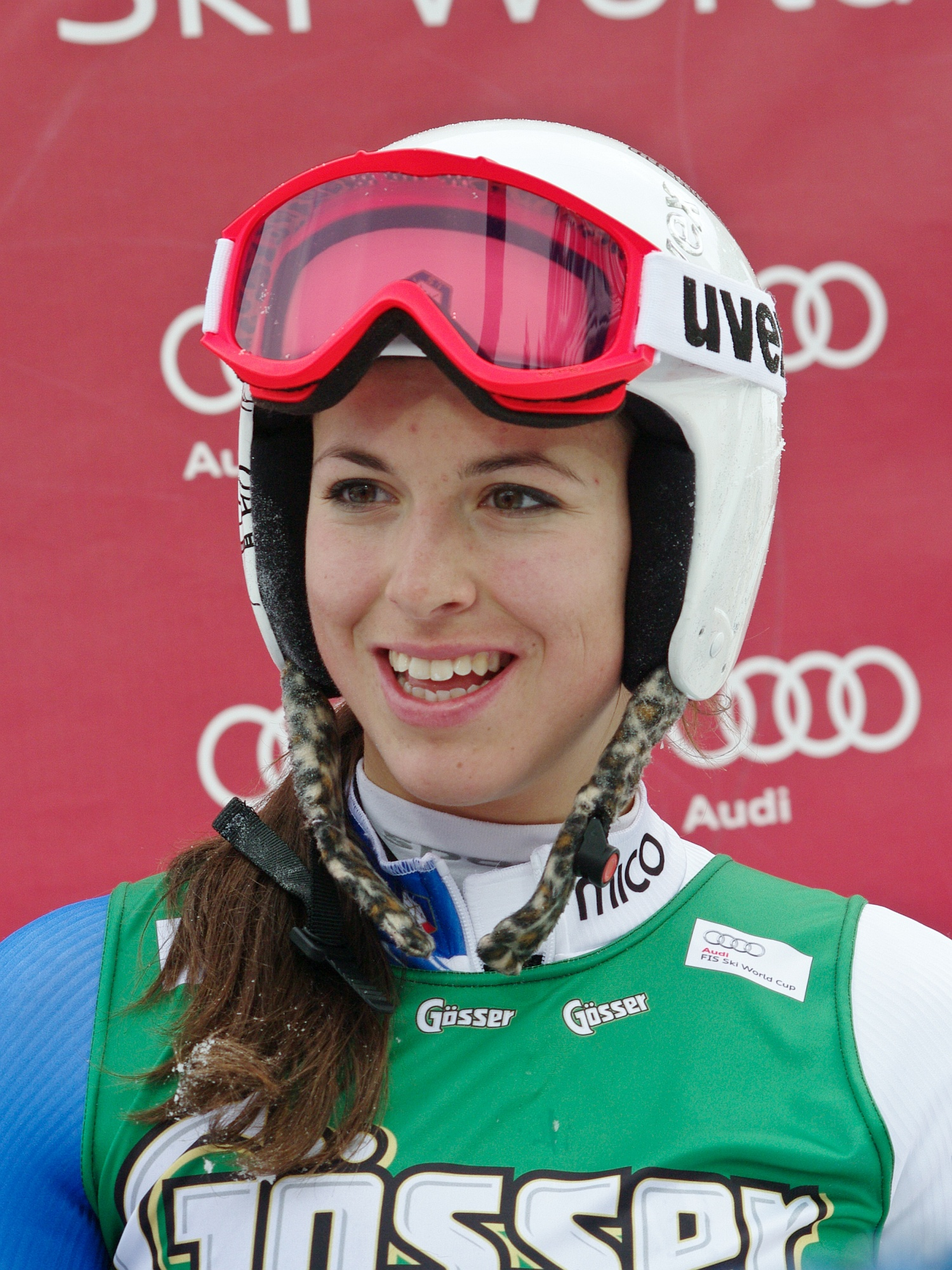
- December 2010

Personal information
- Born: 3 February 1991 (age 35) Morbegno, Sondrio, Lombardy, Italy
- Height: 1.73 m (5 ft 8 in)
- Family: Irene Curtoni (sister)

Skiing career
- Country: Italy
- Sport: Alpine skiing
- Club: C.S. Esercito
- Disciplines: Super-G, downhill, giant slalom, combined
- World Cup debut: 14 November 2009 (age 18)

Olympics
- Teams: 2 – (2022, 2026)
- Medals: 0

World Championships
- Teams: 7 – (2011–17, 2021–25)
- Medals: 0

World Cup
- Seasons: 17 – (2010–2026)
- Wins: 4 – (2 DH, 2 SG)
- Podiums: 13 – (5 DH, 8 SG)
- Overall titles: 0 – (9th in 2023)
- Discipline titles: 0 – (2nd in SG, 2022)
Medal record
Women's alpine skiing
Representing Italy
World Cup race podiums
Event	1st	2nd	3rd
Downhill	2	1	2
Super-G	2	4	2
Total	4	5	4
Junior World Championships
Gold medal – first place	2011 Crans-Montana	Super-G
Bronze medal – third place	2009 Garmisch-Partenkirchen	Combined

Elena Curtoni (born 3 February 1991) is an Italian World Cup alpine ski racer.

Her sister Irene Curtoni is also a former World Cup racer.

== Biography ==
Born in Morbegno, Sondrio, Lombardy, she has competed for Italy in five World Championships.
Curtoni made her World Cup debut in November 2009 at age 18 and gained her first podium in March 2016; her first win was in a downhill at Bansko in January 2020, leading an Italian podium sweep with teammates Marta Bassino and Federica Brignone.

== World Cup results ==
=== Season standings ===
Season
Season	Age	Overall	Slalom	Giant slalom	Super-G	Downhill	Combined
2011	20	53	—	—	23	43	21
2012	21	40	—	47	11	48	15
2013	22	38	—	29	19	44	7
2014	23	75	—	37	35	—	—
2015	24	44	—	33	16	—	18
2016	25	23	—	25	15	16	23
2017	26	17	—	26	4	30	20
2018	27	126	—	52	—	—	—
2019	28	57	—	—	21	35	—
2020	29	15	—	—	11	6	10
2021	30	14	—	18	10	9	—N/a
2022	31	13	—	38	2nd place, silver medalist(s)	19	—N/a
2023	32	9	—	—	4	4	—N/a
2024	33	no World Cup points earned					—N/a
2025	34	25	—	—	5	29	—N/a
2026	35	24	—	—	6	21	—N/a

=== Race podiums ===
- 4 wins – (2 DH, 2 SG)
- 13 podiums – (5 DH, 8 SG), 65 top tens

Season
Season	Date	Location	Discipline	Place
2016	16 March 2016	St. Moritz, Switzerland	Downhill	3rd
2017	18 December 2016	Val d'Isère, France	Super-G	3rd
2017	25 February 2017	Crans-Montana, Switzerland	Super-G	2nd
2020	25 January 2020	Bansko, Bulgaria	Downhill	1st
2021	23 January 2021	Crans-Montana, Switzerland	Downhill	3rd
2022	12 December 2021	St. Moritz, Switzerland	Super-G	2nd
2022	19 December 2021	Val d'Isère, France	Super-G	3rd
2022	23 January 2022	Cortina d'Ampezzo, Italy	Super-G	1st
2023	16 December 2022	St. Moritz, Switzerland	Downhill	1st
2023	18 December 2022	St. Moritz, Switzerland	Super-G	2nd
2023	21 January 2023	Cortina d'Ampezzo, Italy	Downhill	3rd
2023	3 March 2023	Kvitfjell, Norway	Super-G	2nd
2026	8 March 2026	Val di Fassa, Italy	Super-G	1st

== World Championship results ==
Year
Year	Age	Slalom	Giant slalom	Super-G	Downhill	Combined	Team combined
2011	20	—	—	6	—	16	—N/a
2013	22	—	—	18	—	13	—N/a
2015	24	—	—	10	—	DNF1	—N/a
2017	26	—	—	5	—	DNF2	—N/a
2021	30	—	DNS2	18	8	4	—N/a
2023	32	—	—	15	13	9	—N/a
2025	34	—	—	9	—	—N/a	14

== Olympic results ==
Year
Year	Age	Slalom	Giant slalom	Super-G	Downhill	Combined	Team combined
2022	31	—	20	10	5	DNF1	—N/a
2026	35	—	—	7	—	—N/a	—

== See also ==
- Italian female skiers most successful World Cup race winner
