= Marie-Michèle Gagnon =

Canadian alpine skier (born 1989)

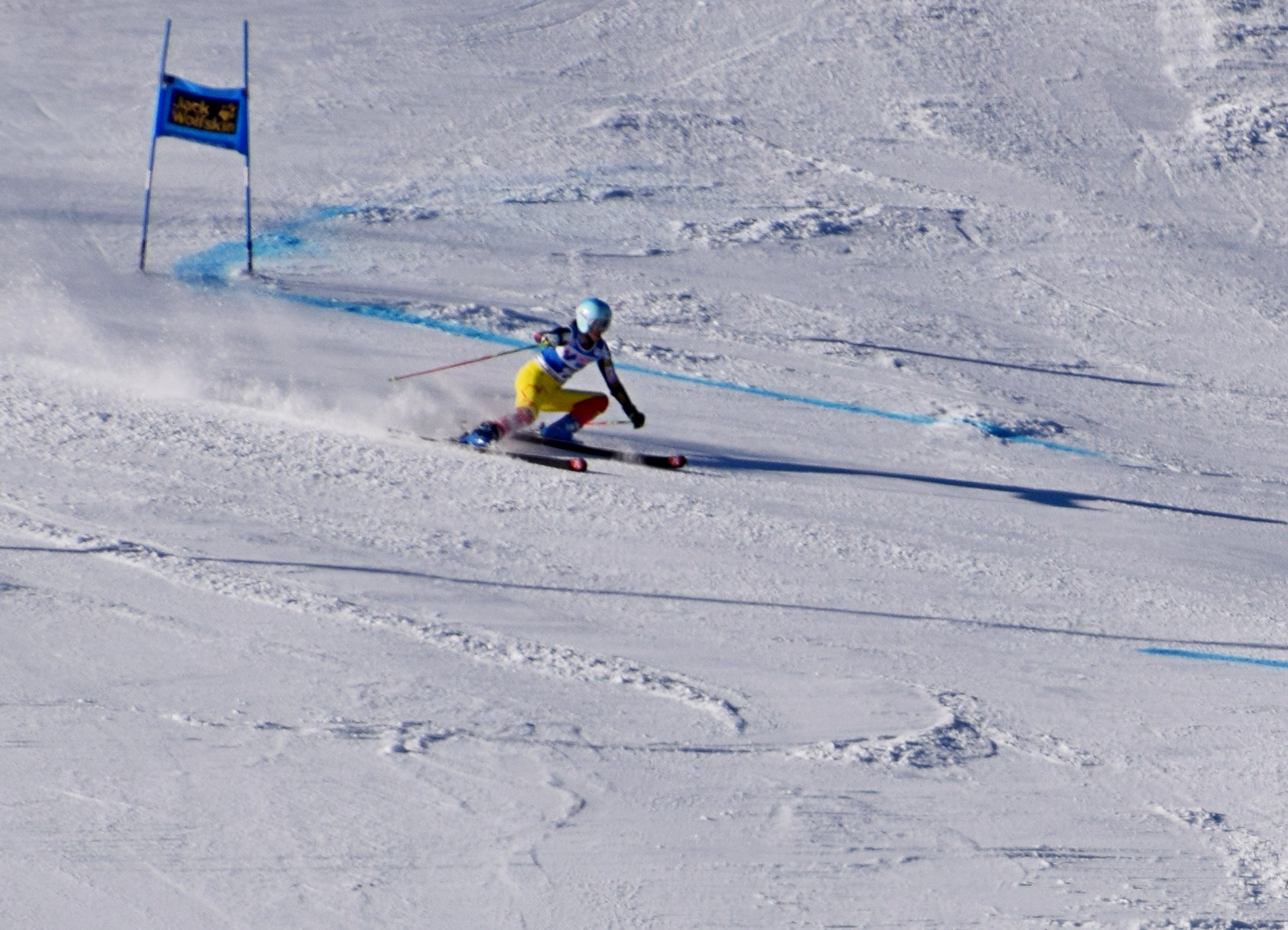
- Gagnon at Courchevel in 2015

Personal information
- Born: 25 April 1989 (age 37) Lac-Etchemin, Quebec, Canada
- Height: 1.77 m (5 ft 10 in)

Skiing career
- Sport: Alpine skiing
- Club: Mont Orignal
- Retired: 2023
- Disciplines: Super-G, downhill, combined, giant slalom
- World Cup debut: 13 December 2008 (age 19)

Olympics
- Teams: 3 - (2010, 2014, 2022)
- Medals: 0

World Championships
- Teams: 8 - (2009–2023)
- Medals: 0

World Cup
- Seasons: 15 - (2009–2023)
- Wins: 2 - (2 SC)
- Podiums: 5 - (2 SL, 2 SC, 1 SG)
- Overall titles: 0 - (13th in 2014)
- Discipline titles: 1 - (SC, 2014)^{[A]}

Marie-Michèle Gagnon (born 25 April 1989) is a Canadian former alpine ski racer.

== Career ==
Gagnon joined the Canadian national team at the age of eighteen, although a leg fracture halted her progress at the start of her rookie season. She made her World Cup debut in December 2008 and has represented Canada at two Winter Olympics and six World Championships.

Gagnon's first World Cup podium came in March 2012, a third-place in a slalom at Åre, Sweden. Her first victory was in January 2014, a combined event at Altenmarkt, Austria. which was the first podium for a Canadian in a World Cup combined event in thirty years. The previous day she scored her first World Cup points in downhill at the same venue. That season she also took her first top ten World Cup finishes in super-G, finishing tenth and sixth in races in Lake Louise and St. Moritz respectively. At the Winter Olympics, Gagnon crashed out of the slalom run of the combined, dislocating her shoulder, before failing to finish the super-G and giant slalom, and securing a ninth place in the slalom. She finished thirteenth in the overall World Cup standings and sixth in slalom.

In January 2022, Gagnon was named to Canada's 2022 Olympic team.

== Personal life ==
Gagnon was the third of five siblings and left the family home at age twelve to pursue her education and ski racing in Mont-Sainte-Anne and Quebec City. Her childhood idols included Mélanie Turgeon, Geneviève Simard, and Erik Guay.

Gagnon has been in a relationship with American alpine racer Travis Ganong since 2008. The pair met through mutual friend Louis-Pierre Hélie; in 2014, the couple moved to a new home in Lake Tahoe, California. They became engaged at the Matterhorn on 15 September 2021. They married in July 2024.

== World Cup results ==
=== Season titles ===
- 1 title (1 combined) ^{[A]}

Season	Discipline
2014	Combined ^{A}

^{A} Crystal globes in combined were not awarded during these seasons, but medals were.

=== Season standings ===
Season	Age	Overall	Slalom	Giant slalom	Super-G	Downhill	Combined
2009	19	73	33	35	—	—	—
2010	20	103	43	—	—	—	—
2011	21	29	22	16	49	—	15
2012	22	21	10	26	44	—	12
2013	23	21	17	23	32	—	4
2014	24	13	6	19	19	51	1
2015	25	28	11	34	31	—	5
2016	26	16	11	14	44	—	4
2017	27	20	13	16	—	—	21
2018	28	86	38	37	—	—	—
2019	29	46	—	24	23	—	13
2020	30	63	—	49	37	30	27
2021	31	24	—	—	11	16	—N/a
2022	32	36	—	—	26	18	—N/a
2023	33	62	—	—	22	33	—N/a

Standings through 5 February 2023

=== Race podiums ===
- 2 wins – (2 SC)
- 5 podiums – (2 SL, 2 SC, 1 SG); 61 top tens

Season	Date	Location	Discipline	Place
2012	10 Mar 2012	Åre, Sweden	Slalom	3rd
2014	12 Jan 2014	Altenmarkt, Austria	Super combined	1st
2016	15 Feb 2016	Crans-Montana, Switzerland	Slalom	3rd
2016	28 Feb 2016	Soldeu, Andorra	Super combined	1st
2021	30 Jan 2021	Garmisch-Partenkirchen, Germany	Super-G	3rd

== World Championship results ==
Year	Age	Slalom	Giant slalom	Super-G	Downhill	Combined
2009	19	DNF1	DNF1	—	—	—
2011	21	DNF1	23	22	—	DNF2
2013	23	13	8	—	—	—
2015	25	10	23	DNF	—	DNF1
2017	27	20	20	19	—	6
2019	29	—	23	21	32	14
2021	31	—	—	6	13	DNF2
2023	33	—	—	26		10

== Olympic results ==
Year	Age	Slalom	Giant slalom	Super-G	Downhill	Combined
2010	20	31	21	—	—	—
2014	24	9	DNF1	DNF	—	DNF2
2018	28	Injured in November, missed rest of season				
2022	32	—	—	14	8	—
