= Ada Hasırcı =

Turkish alpine skier (born 2007)

Personal information
- Born: 22 October 2007 (age 19) Bursa, Turkey

Skiing career
- Country: Turkey
- Sport: Alpine skiing
- Club: Bursa Crystal SK
- Disciplines: Slalom, Giant slalom

Olympics
- Teams: 1 – (2026)
- Medals: 0

Ada Hasırcı (born 22 October 2007) is a Turkish alpine ski racer who specializes in the slalom and giant slalom events. She was one of 8 athletes to represent Turkey at the 2026 Winter Olympics in Milan and Cortina d'Ampezzo.

== Sport career ==
In 2017 at age ten, Hasırcı competed at the Interschools Alpine Discipline Ski and Snowboard Championships held in Erzurum, and took the second place in the giant slalom event.

She is a member of Bursa Crystal SK. She specializes in the technical disciplines of slalom and giant slalom.

=== 2023 ===
Hasırcı debuted internationally at the Entry League FIS at the Snow Arena in Druskininkai, Lithuania in October 2023. In December that year, she competed at National Junior Championships in Kronplatz and Furkelpass, Italy.

=== 2024 ===
As the only female member of the Turkish delegation, Hasırcı participated in the slalom and giant slalom events at the 2024 Winter Youth Olympics in Jeongseon Alpine Centre, Gangwon, South Korea in January 2024. The next week, she competed at the FIS Tournament in Ravna planina, Pale, Bosnia and Herzogivano. In February 2024, she competed in the slalom and giant slalom events at the World Junior Alpine Skiing Championships 2024 in Saint-Jean-d'Aulps and Avoriaz, France. The next week, she participated in the slalom and giant slalom events at the FIS Tournament in Kupres, Bosnia and Herzegovina. In March 2024, she competed at the National Junior Championships in Borșa, Romania. One week later, she was at the FIS Tournament in Parnassus, Greece, where she won her first international medal, in bronze, in the slalom event. In the giant slalom, she ranked fourth. In April 2024, she competed in both events at the Bulgarian National Championships in Bansko and at the Austrian National Championships in Reiteralm.

=== 2025 ===
In November 2025, Hasırcı took part at the FIS Tournament in Hochfügen and in December at the National Junior Race in Reitersalm, Austria. In the same month, she won the silver medal at the Turkish National Championships in Sarıkamış.

=== 2026 ===
She represented her country in the slalom event at the 2026 Winter Olympics in Cortina d'Ampezzo, Italy.

== Personal life ==
Ada Hasırcı was born in Bursa, Turkey on 22 October 2007. She has an older brother, Demirkan, who is also a national alpine ski racer.

She attended SEV American College in Istanbul for her primary and secondary education.

== Olympic results ==
Year
Year	Age	Slalom	Giant slalom	Super-G	Downhill	Team combined
2026	18	DNF1	—	—	—	—
