= Ida Štimac =

Croatian alpine skier (born 2000)

Personal information
- Nationality: Croatian
- Born: 13 May 2000 (age 25)

Sport
- Sport: Alpine skiing

Ida Štimac (Croatian pronunciation: [ǐːda ʃtǐːmats]; born 13 May 2000) is a Croatian former alpine skier, from Rijeka, Croatia. She is now a medical student.

== Competitions ==
She competed in the women's giant slalom at the 2018 Winter Olympics. At age 16 she won the International Ski Federation's Slalom Championship in Passo Monte Croce, Italy.
