= Haruna Ishikawa =

Japanese alpine skier (born 1994)

Personal information
- Nationality: Japanese
- Born: 20 July 1994 (age 30)

Sport
- Sport: Alpine skiing

Haruna Ishikawa (石川 晴菜, Ishikawa Haruna, born 20 July 1994) is a Japanese alpine skier. She competed in the women's giant slalom at the 2018 Winter Olympics.
