= Furkelpass =

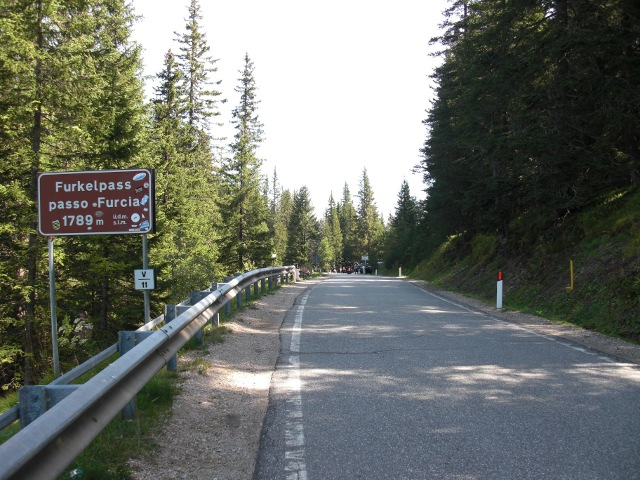

- Location within Alps
- Elevation: 1,789 metres (5,869 ft)
- Traversed by: Road (Strada Furcia)

Third Approach
- Location: South Tyrol, Italy
- Range: Alps
- Coordinates: 46°43′23″N 11°58′10″E

The Furkelpass is a mountain pass in South Tyrol, Italy.

The Furkelpass also Furkelsattel or simply the Furkel called (Ladin Ju de Furcia, Italian Passo Furcia), is a 1789 m high mountain pass in the Dolomites. The pass lies between the 2275 m high Kronplatz in the north and the 2507 m high Piz da Peres in the south and links the towns of Olang in the Puster Valley and San Vigilio in Mareo. The pass marks the linguistic border between the German and Ladin speaking areas of northern Italy.

The climb is 19 km long and rises 744 meters, with a maximum gradient of 15%. The road has repeatedly attracted the Giro d'Italia (in 1981, 1994, 1997, 2004, 2006, 2008 and 2010), and the "Transalp" (crossing of the Alps by bicycle).

The pass is open in winter. As it crosses the Plan de Corones skiing resort, skiers are routed via a bridge over the pass road. From the pass, there is a direct connection to the Kronplatz and to San Vigilio.

Since 2003 there has been an artificial lake on the pass, which is required for artificial snow.

== See also ==
- List of highest paved roads in Europe
- List of mountain passes
