= Alpine skiing at the 2018 Winter Olympics – Women's giant slalom =

Women's giant slalom at the XXIII Olympic Winter Games
- Alpine skiing
- Venue: Yongpyong Alpine Centre, Pyeongchang, South Korea
- Date: 15 February 2018
- Competitors: 79 from 48 nations
- Winning time: 2:20.02

Medalists
1st place, gold medalist(s)		Mikaela Shiffrin	United States
2nd place, silver medalist(s)		Ragnhild Mowinckel	Norway
3rd place, bronze medalist(s)		Federica Brignone	Italy

The women's giant slalom competition of the PyeongChang 2018 Olympics was held on 15 February 2018 at the Yongpyong Alpine Centre at the Alpensia Sports Park in PyeongChang. Originally set to be held on 12 February 2018, winds in excess of 50 km/h forced officials to reschedule the race for 15 February 2018.

In the victory ceremony, the medals were presented by Princess Nora of Liechtenstein, member of the International Olympic Committee, accompanied by Dexter Paine, FIS Vice President.

== Qualification ==
A total of up to 320 alpine skiers qualified across all eleven events. Athletes qualified for this event by having met the A qualification standard, which meant having 140 or less FIS Points and being ranked in the top 500 in the Olympic FIS points list or meeting the B standard, which meant 140 or less FIS points. Countries not meeting the A standard were allowed to enter a maximum of one B standard athlete per gender.

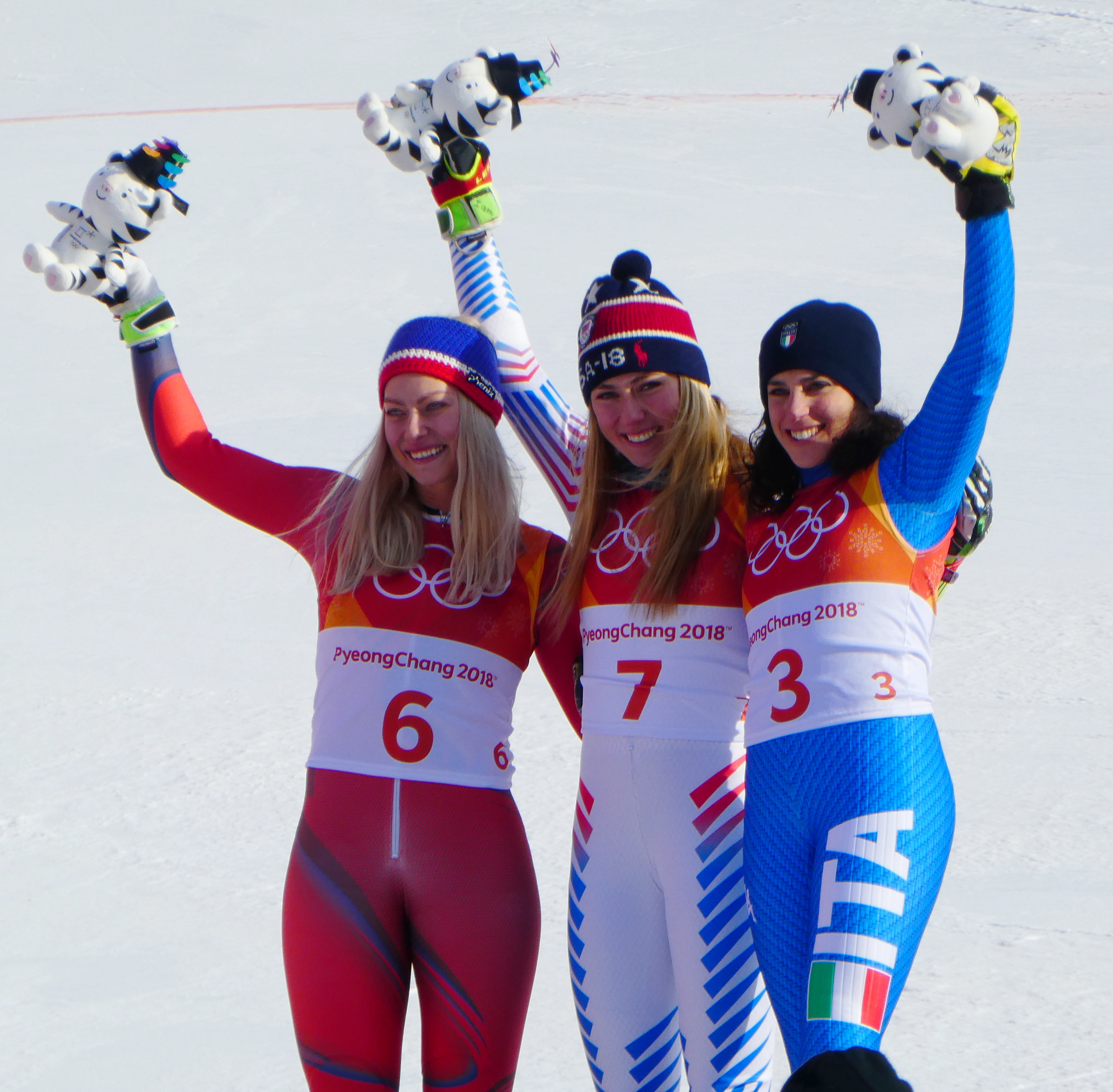
Ragnhild Mowinckel (silver) at left, gold is Mikaela Shiffrin at centre and bronze to Federica Brignone (right)

The Points list takes into average the best results of athletes per discipline during the qualification period (July 1, 2016 to January 21, 2018). Countries received additional quotas by having athletes ranked in the top 30 of the 2017–18 FIS Alpine Ski World Cup (two per gender maximum, overall across all events). After the distribution of B standard quotas (to nations competing only in the slalom and giant slalom events), the remaining quotas were distributed using the Olympic FIS Points list, with each athlete only counting once for qualification purposes. A country could only enter a maximum of four athletes for the event.

== Results ==
The race was started at 10:00 (Run 1) and 13:45 (Run 2).

Rank	Bib	Name	Nation	Run 1	Rank	Run 2	Rank	Total	Behind
1st place, gold medalist(s)	7	Mikaela Shiffrin	United States	1:10.82	2	1:09.20	4	2:20.02	–
2nd place, silver medalist(s)	6	Ragnhild Mowinckel	Norway	1:11.17	4	1:09.24	5	2:20.41	+0.39
3rd place, bronze medalist(s)	3	Federica Brignone	Italy	1:10.91	3	1:09.57	8	2:20.48	+0.46
4	5	Viktoria Rebensburg	Germany	1:11.45	8	1:09.15	3	2:20.60	+0.58
5	13	Marta Bassino	Italy	1:11.19	5	1:09.50	7	2:20.69	+0.67
6	16	Frida Hansdotter	Sweden	1:11.32	7	1:09.73	11	2:21.05	+1.03
7	2	Tessa Worley	France	1:12.06	14	1:09.00	2	2:21.06	+1.04
8	1	Manuela Mölgg	Italy	1:10.62	1	1:10.58	23	2:21.20	+1.18
9	11	Wendy Holdener	Switzerland	1:11.92	13	1:09.35	6	2:21.27	+1.25
10	9	Sara Hector	Sweden	1:11.22	6	1:10.31	19	2:21.53	+1.51
11	14	Sofia Goggia	Italy	1:11.64	10	1:10.16	18	2:21.80	+1.78
12	18	Anna Veith	Austria	1:12.43	15	1:09.67	10	2:22.10	+2.08
13	10	Petra Vlhová	Slovakia	1:11.71	12	1:10.42	21	2:22.13	+2.11
14	19	Meta Hrovat	Slovenia	1:12.76	16	1:09.59	9	2:22.35	+2.33
15	20	Nina Haver-Løseth	Norway	1:13.13	18	1:09.97	13	2:23.10	+3.08
16	22	Estelle Alphand	Sweden	1:14.23	26	1:08.99	1	2:23.22	+3.20
17	23	Ricarda Haaser	Austria	1:13.37	19	1:09.99	14	2:23.36	+3.34
18	26	Kristin Lysdahl	Norway	1:13.45	21	1:09.95	12	2:23.40	+3.38
19	28	Taïna Barioz	France	1:13.54	23	1:10.06	15	2:23.60	+3.58
20	25	Adeline Baud Mugnier	France	1:12.89	17	1:11.04	26	2:23.93	+3.91
21	29	Ana Bucik	Slovenia	1:13.38	20	1:10.71	24	2:24.09	+4.07
22	17	Tina Weirather	Liechtenstein	1:14.08	25	1:10.14	17	2:24.22	+4.20
23	49	Ester Ledecká	Czech Republic	1:14.62	29	1:10.07	16	2:24.69	+4.67
24	24	Bernadette Schild	Austria	1:14.50	28	1:10.31	19	2:24.81	+4.79
25	37	Candace Crawford	Canada	1:14.70	30	1:10.46	22	2:25.16	+5.14
26	33	Nevena Ignjatović	Serbia	1:14.41	27	1:10.99	25	2:25.40	+5.38
27	38	Maryna Gąsienica-Daniel	Poland	1:13.89	24	1:11.80	28	2:25.69	+5.67
28	21	Simone Wild	Switzerland	1:13.52	22	1:13.23	33	2:26.75	+6.73
29	54	Gabriela Capová	Czech Republic	1:15.80	34	1:11.62	27	2:27.42	+7.40
30	46	Anastasiia Silanteva	Olympic Athletes from Russia	1:15.67	32	1:12.28	29	2:27.95	+7.93
31	31	Megan McJames	United States	1:16.00	35	1:12.39	30	2:28.39	+8.37
32	48	Andrea Komšić	Croatia	1:15.54	31	1:12.96	32	2:28.50	+8.48
33	32	Haruna Ishikawa	Japan	1:16.49	36	1:12.50	31	2:28.99	+8.97
34	55	Ida Štimac	Croatia	1:16.86	40	1:14.32	36	2:31.18	+11.16
35	35	Alice Robinson	New Zealand	1:16.66	37	1:14.53	38	2:31.19	+11.17
36	57	Resi Stiegler	United States	1:16.72	38	1:15.02	40	2:31.74	+11.72
37	39	Soňa Moravčíková	Slovakia	1:17.88	43	1:14.11	34	2:31.99	+11.97
38	47	Maria Shkanova	Belarus	1:18.17	45	1:14.16	35	2:32.33	+12.31
39	51	Kim Vanreusel	Belgium	1:17.60	41	1:14.92	39	2:32.52	+12.50
40	62	Maria Kirkova	Bulgaria	1:18.39	46	1:14.38	37	2:32.77	+12.75
41	58	Barbara Kantorová	Slovakia	1:17.74	42	1:15.20	41	2:32.94	+12.92
42	45	Nicol Gastaldi	Argentina	1:18.06	44	1:15.38	43	2:33.44	+13.42
43	50	Lelde Gasūna	Latvia	1:18.65	47	1:15.30	42	2:33.95	+13.93
44	68	Elvedina Muzaferija	Bosnia and Herzegovina	1:19.33	49	1:15.57	44	2:34.90	+14.88
45	53	Gim So-hui	South Korea	1:19.13	48	1:16.24	45	2:35.37	+15.35
46	61	Nino Tsiklauri	Georgia	1:20.02	51	1:16.91	46	2:36.93	+16.91
47	56	Kang Young-seo	South Korea	1:19.67	50	1:17.39	48	2:37.06	+17.04
48	66	Mialitiana Clerc	Madagascar	1:21.82	55	1:17.18	47	2:39.00	+18.98
49	76	Szonja Hozmann	Hungary	1:21.77	54	1:17.62	49	2:39.39	+19.37
50	65	Tess Arbez	Ireland	1:22.12	56	1:18.12	50	2:40.24	+20.22
51	69	Mariya Grigorova	Kazakhstan	1:22.42	57	1:18.77	51	2:41.19	+21.17
52	70	Sophia Ralli	Greece	1:22.46	58	1:19.20	52	2:41.66	+21.64
53	73	Suela Mëhilli	Albania	1:24.67	60	1:21.90	54	2:46.57	+26.55
54	72	Ieva Januškevičiūtė	Lithuania	1:26.38	62	1:20.64	53	2:47.02	+27.00
55	64	Kong Fanying	China	1:26.30	61	1:23.58	56	2:49.88	+29.86
56	74	Arabella Ng	Hong Kong	1:27.25	63	1:23.29	55	2:50.54	+30.52
57	78	Özlem Çarıkçıoğlu	Turkey	1:27.71	64	1:25.29	57	2:53.00	+32.98
58	79	Jelena Vujičić	Montenegro	1:30.53	66	1:28.12	58	2:58.65	+38.63
	4	Stephanie Brunner	Austria	1:11.53	9	DNF	—N/a		
	12	Ana Drev	Slovenia	1:11.64	10	DNF	—N/a		
	36	Valérie Grenier	Canada	1:15.74	33	DNF	—N/a		
	40	Sarah Schleper	Mexico	1:16.80	39	DNF	—N/a		
	60	Freydís Halla Einarsdóttir	Iceland	1:20.02	51	DNF	—N/a		
	63	Olha Knysh	Ukraine	1:20.51	53	DNF	—N/a		
	67	Sabrina Simader	Kenya	1:23.27	59	DNF	—N/a		
	77	Mariann Mimi Maróty	Hungary	1:29.74	65	DSQ	—N/a		
	81	Kim Ryon-hyang	North Korea	1:40.22	67	DSQ	—N/a		
	8	Lara Gut	Switzerland	DNF	—N/a				
	15	Tina Robnik	Slovenia	DNF	—N/a				
	27	Alexandra Tilley	Great Britain	DNF	—N/a				
	30	Leona Popović	Croatia	DNF	—N/a				
	34	Patricia Mangan	United States	DNF	—N/a				
	41	Kateřina Pauláthová	Czech Republic	DNF	—N/a				
	42	Noelle Barahona	Chile	DNF	—N/a				
	43	Maren Skjøld	Norway	DNF	—N/a				
	44	Martina Dubovská	Czech Republic	DNF	—N/a				
	75	Alexia Arisarah Schenkel	Thailand	DNF	—N/a				
	80	Anna Lotta Jõgeva	Estonia	DNF	—N/a				
	71	Élise Pellegrin	Malta	DSQ	—N/a				
	52	Lana Zbašnik	Croatia	DNS	—N/a				
	59	Ania Monica Caill	Romania	DNS	—N/a				
