= Alpine skiing at the 2026 Winter Olympics – Women's slalom =

Women's slalom at the XXV Olympic Winter Games
- Alpine skiing
- Venue: Olimpia delle Tofane, Cortina d'Ampezzo
- Date: 18 February 2026
- Competitors: 95 from 57 nations
- Winning time: 1:39.10

Medalists
| 1st place, gold medalist(s) | | Mikaela Shiffrin | United States |
| 2nd place, silver medalist(s) | | Camille Rast | Switzerland |
| 3rd place, bronze medalist(s) | | Anna Swenn-Larsson | Sweden |

Women's slalom
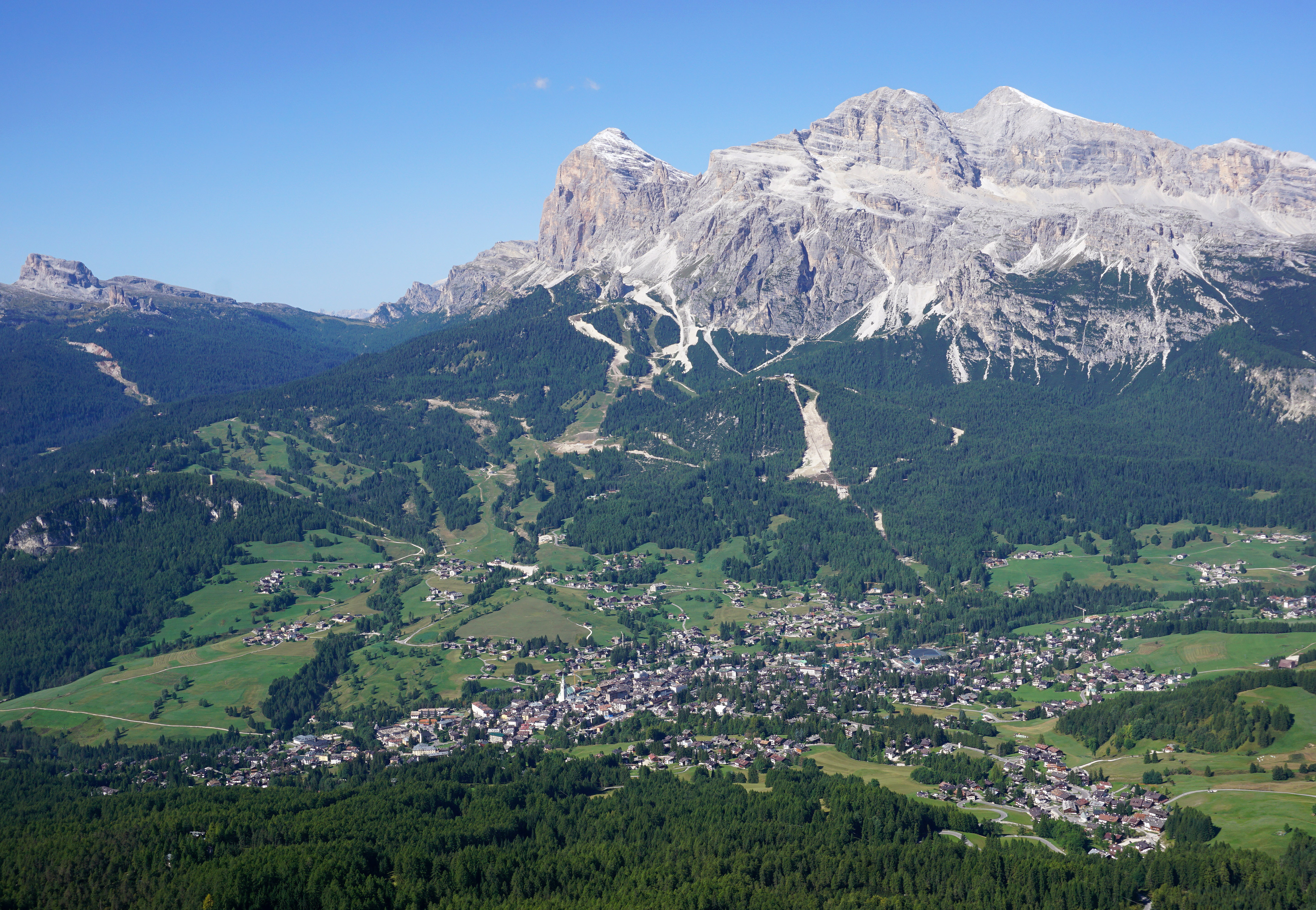
- Location: Olimpia delle Tofane
- Nearest major city: Cortina d'Ampezzo
- Vertical: 180 m (591 ft)
- Top elevation: 1,735 m (5,692 ft) AMSL
- Base elevation: 1,555 m (5,102 ft)

The women's slalom competition of the 2026 Winter Olympics was held on Wednesday, 18 February, at Olimpia delle Tofane in Cortina d'Ampezzo, Italy. Mikaela Shiffrin of the United States won the event 12 years after her gold medal in 2014 as a teenager. Camille Rast of Switzerland won the silver medal, and Anna Swenn-Larsson of Sweden the bronze. Rast and Swenn-Larsson won their first Olympic medals.

== Background ==
The defending champion, Petra Vlhová, qualified for the event after missing two years of competitions with an injury; bronze medalist Wendy Holdener qualified as well. Silver medalist Katharina Liensberger injured her right knee in training in early January, ending her season. Prior to the Olympics on the World Cup circuit, Mikaela Shiffrin led both the overall and the slalom standings. Camille Rast was the reigning world champion.

== Results ==
The race was started at 10:00 (first run) and 13:30 (second run) local time (UTC+1), both were under sunny skies with icy snow conditions. The first run's air temperature was −8.8 °C (16 °F) at the starting gate and −8.9 °C (16 °F) at the finish area. The second run's air temperature was −4.3 °C (24 °F) at the starting gate and 0.7 °C (33 °F) at the finish area.

| Rank | Bib | Name | Nation | Run 1 | Rank | Run 2 | Rank | Total | Behind |
|---|---|---|---|---|---|---|---|---|---|
| 1st place, gold medalist(s) | 7 | Mikaela Shiffrin | United States | 47.13 | 1 | 51.97 | 2 | 1:39.10 | — |
| 2nd place, silver medalist(s) | 3 | Camille Rast | Switzerland | 48.18 | 4 | 52.42 | 5 | 1:40.60 | +1.50 |
| 3rd place, bronze medalist(s) | 12 | Anna Swenn-Larsson | Sweden | 48.29 | 5 | 52.52 | 9 | 1:40.81 | +1.71 |
| 4 | 5 | Wendy Holdener | Switzerland | 48.29 | 5 | 52.74 | 14 | 1:41.03 | +1.93 |
| 5 | 4 | Katharina Truppe | Austria | 48.77 | 10 | 52.33 | 4 | 1:41.10 | +2.00 |
| 6 | 8 | Katharina Huber | Austria | 48.68 | 9 | 52.50 | 8 | 1:41.18 | +2.08 |
| 7 | 14 | Mélanie Meillard | Switzerland | 49.07 | 14 | 52.18 | 3 | 1:41.25 | +2.15 |
| 8 | 2 | Paula Moltzan | United States | 49.90 | 28 | 51.39 | 1 | 1:41.29 | +2.19 |
| 9 | 10 | Emma Aicher | Germany | 48.45 | 8 | 53.14 | 20 | 1:41.59 | +2.49 |
| 10 | 1 | Lara Colturi | Albania | 48.39 | 7 | 53.39 | 23 | 1:41.78 | +2.68 |
| 10 | 25 | Caitlin McFarlane | France | 48.88 | 12 | 52.90 | 16 | 1:41.78 | +2.68 |
| 12 | 18 | Laurence St-Germain | Canada | 49.39 | 18 | 52.43 | 6 | 1:41.82 | +2.72 |
| 13 | 24 | Martina Peterlini | Italy | 49.67 | 23 | 52.46 | 7 | 1:42.13 | +3.03 |
| 13 | 16 | Lara Della Mea | Italy | 49.14 | 15 | 52.99 | 17 | 1:42.13 | +3.03 |
| 15 | 21 | Marie Lamure | France | 49.03 | 13 | 53.11 | 19 | 1:42.14 | +3.04 |
| 16 | 32 | Ali Nullmeyer | Canada | 49.47 | 20 | 52.70 | 11 | 1:42.17 | +3.07 |
| 17 | 28 | Mina Fürst Holtmann | Norway | 49.46 | 19 | 52.73 | 13 | 1:42.19 | +3.09 |
| 18 | 37 | Martina Dubovská | Czech Republic | 49.69 | 24 | 52.59 | 10 | 1:42.28 | +3.18 |
| 19 | 33 | AJ Hurt | United States | 49.35 | 17 | 53.08 | 18 | 1:42.43 | +3.33 |
| 20 | 23 | Petra Vlhová | Slovakia | 49.99 | 29 | 52.71 | 12 | 1:42.70 | +3.60 |
| 21 | 38 | Bianca Bakke Westhoff | Norway | 49.99 | 29 | 52.78 | 15 | 1:42.77 | +3.67 |
| 22 | 20 | Katharina Gallhuber | Austria | 49.70 | 25 | 53.16 | 22 | 1:42.86 | +3.76 |
| 23 | 36 | Madison Hoffman | Australia | 49.88 | 26 | 53.15 | 21 | 1:43.03 | +3.93 |
| 24 | 26 | Ana Bucik Jogan | Slovenia | 49.89 | 27 | 53.83 | 25 | 1:43.72 | +4.62 |
| 25 | 27 | Lisa Hörhager | Austria | 50.13 | 32 | 53.82 | 24 | 1:43.95 | +4.85 |
| 26 | 11 | Zrinka Ljutić | Croatia | 49.30 | 16 | 54.69 | 30 | 1:43.99 | +4.89 |
| 27 | 34 | Amelia Smart | Canada | 50.06 | 31 | 54.43 | 26 | 1:44.49 | +5.39 |
| 28 | 35 | Nika Tomšič | Slovenia | 50.33 | 34 | 54.64 | 29 | 1:44.97 | +5.87 |
| 29 | 49 | Silja Koskinen | Finland | 50.81 | 37 | 54.49 | 27 | 1:45.30 | +6.20 |
| 30 | 54 | Caterina Sinigoi | Slovenia | 50.87 | 38 | 54.54 | 28 | 1:45.41 | +6.31 |
| 31 | 45 | Zita Tóth | Hungary | 50.73 | 36 | 55.71 | 33 | 1:46.44 | +7.34 |
| 32 | 56 | Madeleine Beck | Liechtenstein | 51.23 | 40 | 55.42 | 31 | 1:46.65 | +7.55 |
| 33 | 47 | Arrieta Rodríguez | Spain | 51.19 | 39 | 55.64 | 32 | 1:46.83 | +7.73 |
| 34 | 48 | Kim Vanreusel | Belgium | 51.46 | 41 | 55.71 | 33 | 1:47.17 | +8.07 |
| 35 | 39 | Kiki Alexander | Canada | 51.74 | 42 | 55.75 | 35 | 1:47.49 | +8.39 |
| 36 | 52 | Lila Lapanja | Slovenia | 51.91 | 44 | 55.87 | 36 | 1:47.78 | +8.68 |
| 37 | 44 | Maria Shkanova | Individual Neutral Athletes | 51.86 | 43 | 56.08 | 37 | 1:47.94 | +8.84 |
| 38 | 58 | Alena Labaštová | Czech Republic | 52.12 | 45 | 56.88 | 38 | 1:49.00 | +9.90 |
| 39 | 68 | Lara Markthaler | South Africa | 52.72 | 46 | 56.95 | 40 | 1:49.67 | +10.57 |
| 39 | 50 | Piera Hudson | United Arab Emirates | 52.74 | 48 | 56.93 | 39 | 1:49.67 | +10.57 |
| 41 | 63 | Anina Zurbriggen | Bulgaria | 52.73 | 47 | 57.07 | 41 | 1:49.80 | +10.70 |
| 42 | 66 | Clara-Marie Vorre | Denmark | 53.03 | 49 | 58.69 | 43 | 1:51.72 | +12.62 |
| 43 | 67 | Liene Bondare | Latvia | 53.95 | 53 | 58.30 | 42 | 1:52.25 | +13.15 |
| 44 | 70 | Aruwin Salehhuddin | Malaysia | 55.09 | 54 | 59.73 | 44 | 1:54.82 | +15.72 |
| 45 | 72 | Vanina Guerillot | Portugal | 53.48 | 52 | 1:01.66 | 47 | 1:55.14 | +16.04 |
| 46 | 80 | Esma Alić | Bosnia and Herzegovina | 55.32 | 55 | 59.99 | 45 | 1:55.31 | +16.21 |
| 47 | 76 | Neringa Stepanauskaitė | Lithuania | 55.59 | 56 | 1:01.91 | 48 | 1:57.50 | +18.40 |
| 48 | 81 | Anabelle Zurbay | Ireland | 56.91 | 57 | 1:01.59 | 46 | 1:58.50 | +19.40 |
| 49 | 93 | Mialitiana Clerc | Madagascar | 58.97 | 58 | 1:03.63 | 49 | 2:02.60 | +23.50 |
| 50 | 94 | Tallulah Proulx | Philippines | 1:02.93 | 61 | 1:05.55 | 50 | 2:08.48 | +29.38 |
| 51 | 92 | Anastasia Papathoma | Azerbaijan | 1:01.81 | 59 | 1:07.34 | 51 | 2:09.15 | +30.05 |
| 52 | 86 | Lee Wen-yi | Chinese Taipei | 1:05.47 | 63 | 1:07.66 | 52 | 2:13.13 | +34.03 |
| 53 | 90 | Sadaf Saveh Shemshaki | Iran | 1:06.64 | 64 | 1:11.95 | 53 | 2:18.59 | +39.49 |
| | 6 | Lena Dürr | Germany | 47.95 | 2 | DNF | | — | |
| | 13 | Cornelia Öhlund | Sweden | 48.13 | 3 | DNF | | — | |
| | 9 | Sara Hector | Sweden | 48.84 | 11 | DNF | | — | |
| | 19 | Eliane Christen | Switzerland | 49.63 | 22 | DNF | | — | |
| | 40 | Doriane Escané | France | 50.63 | 35 | DNF | | — | |
| | 51 | Rosa Pohjolainen | Finland | 50.25 | 33 | DNF | | — | |
| | 60 | Aniela Sawicka | Poland | 53.03 | 50 | DNF | | — | |
| | 62 | Sofia Moldovan | Romania | 53.21 | 51 | DNF | | — | |
| | 89 | Zhang Yuying | China | 1:02.72 | 60 | DNF | | — | |
| | 91 | Eloise King | Hong Kong | 1:04.16 | 62 | DNF | | — | |
| | 31 | Leona Popović | Croatia | 49.55 | 21 | DSQ | | — | |
| | 15 | Marion Chevrier | France | DNF | | — | | | |
| | 17 | Dženifera Ģērmane | Latvia | DNF | | — | | | |
| | 22 | Hanna Aronsson Elfman | Sweden | DNF | | — | | | |
| | 29 | Asa Ando | Japan | DNF | | — | | | |
| | 30 | Nina O'Brien | United States | DNF | | — | | | |
| | 46 | Phoebe Heaydon | Australia | DNF | | — | | | |
| | 41 | Anna Trocker | Italy | DNF | | — | | | |
| | 42 | Carla Mijares Ruf | Andorra | DNF | | — | | | |
| | 43 | Francesca Baruzzi Farriol | Argentina | DNF | | — | | | |
| | 53 | Thea Louise Stjernesund | Norway | DNF | | — | | | |
| | 55 | Gim So-hui | South Korea | DNF | | — | | | |
| | 57 | Noa Szőllős | Israel | DNF | | — | | | |
| | 59 | Alexandra Skorokhodova | Kazakhstan | DNF | | — | | | |
| | 61 | Jana Atanasovska | North Macedonia | DNF | | — | | | |
| | 64 | Celine Sommerová | Czech Republic | DNF | | — | | | |
| | 65 | Gwyneth ten Raa | Luxembourg | DNF | | — | | | |
| | 69 | Katarína Šrobová | Slovakia | DNF | | — | | | |
| | 71 | Emma Gatcliffe | Trinidad and Tobago | DNF | | — | | | |
| | 73 | Anastasiya Shepilenko | Ukraine | DNF | | — | | | |
| | 74 | Pia Vučinić | Croatia | DNF | | — | | | |
| | 75 | Park Seo-yun | South Korea | DNF | | — | | | |
| | 77 | Elín Elmarsdóttir Van Pelt | Iceland | DNF | | — | | | |
| | 78 | Semire Dauti | Albania | DNF | | — | | | |
| | 82 | Sonja Li Kristinsdóttir | Iceland | DNF | | — | | | |
| | 85 | Kiana Kryeziu | Kosovo | DNF | | — | | | |
| | 87 | Alice Padilha | Brazil | DNF | | — | | | |
| | 88 | Ada Hasırcı | Turkey | DNF | | — | | | |
| | 95 | Andrea Loizidou | Cyprus | DNF | | — | | | |
| | 79 | Nino Tsiklauri | Georgia | DSQ | | — | | | |
| | 84 | Lisa Brunga | Albania | DSQ | | — | | | |
| | 83 | Maria Tsiovolou | Greece | DSQ | | — | | | |
