= 2017 Alpine Skiing World Cup – Women's combined =

Alpine ski discipline year standings

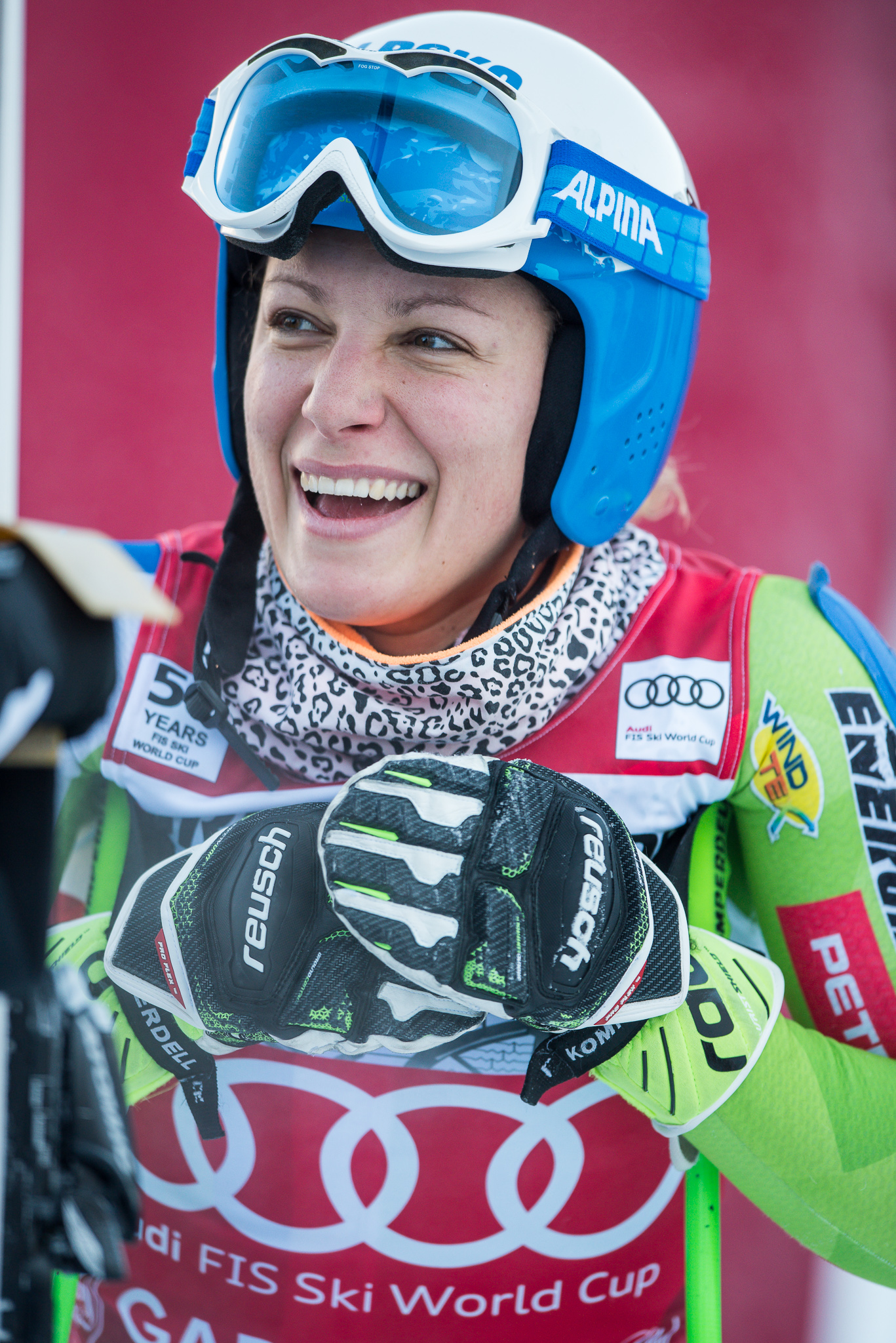
2017 Women's combined World Cup: Ilka Štuhec of Slovenia, season champion; 2017 Women's World Cup; Overall • downhill • Super-G; giant slalom • slalom • Combined
Previous: 2016	Next: 2018

The Women's Combined in the 2017 FIS Alpine Skiing World Cup involved three events, first a super-combined (downhill and one run of slalom), and then two Alpine combined (a Super-G and one run of slalom). Downhill champion Ilka Štuhec of Slovenia won the super-combined and held on to win the season championship. Interestingly, in only her second race in the combined discipline ever, overall World Cup champion Mikaela Shiffrin won the final race.

The season was interrupted by the 2017 World Ski Championships, which were held from 6–20 February in St. Moritz, Switzerland. The women's combined was held on 10 February.

At this time, combined races were not included in the season finals, which were held in 2017 in Aspen, Colorado (USA).

== Standings ==
	Venue	16 Dec 2016; Val d'Isère	24 Feb 2017; Crans-Montana	26 Feb 2017; Crans-Montana	
#	Skier	(France)	(Switzerland)	(Switzerland)	Total
	(Slovenia) Ilka Štuhec	100	80	60	240
2	(Italy) Federica Brignone	40	100	80	220
3	(Switzerland) Wendy Holdener	50	50	40	140
4	(Austria) Michaela Kirchgasser	45	60	DNF1	105
5	(Switzerland) Michelle Gisin	80	DNF1	24	104
6	(United States) Mikaela Shiffrin	DNS		100	100
	(Canada) Marie-Michèle Gagnon	10	40	50	100
8	(Italy) Sofia Goggia	60	DNF1	32	92
9	(Norway) Ragnhild Mowinckel	15	16	36	67
	(Slovenia) Maruša Ferk	22	45	DNF1	67
11	(Norway) Maria Therese Tviberg	8	18	26	52
12	(Austria) Rosina Schneeberger	29	DSQ1	22	51
13	(Austria) Ramona Siebenhofer	20	15	13	48
14	(Austria) Ricarda Haaser	DNS	DNF2	45	45
15	(Austria) Elisabeth Kappaurer	DNS	24	20	44
16	(Austria) Stephanie Brunner	DNS	36	DNF1	36
	(Switzerland) Denise Feierabend	36	DNS		36
18	(France) Anne-Sophie Barthet	32	DNF2	DNF1	32
	(Germany) Lena Dürr	DNS	32	DNF2	32
20	(Italy) Marta Bassino	DNF1	DNF1	29	29
	(Italy) Elena Curtoni	DNF1	29	DNF2	29
	(Switzerland) Rahel Kopp	5	9	15	29
23	(Croatia) Leona Popović	DNS	13	14	27
24	(United States) Laurenne Ross	26	DNS	DNF2	26
	(Italy) Federica Sosio	DNS	26	DNF1	26
	References				

- Winner
- 2nd place
- 3rd place
- DNF1 = Did Not Finish run 1
- DNF2 = Did Not Finish run 2
- DNS = Did Not Start
- DSQ1 = Disqualified run 1
- DSQ2 = Disqualified run 2
- Updated at 19 March 2017, after all events.

== See also ==
- 2017 Alpine Skiing World Cup – Women's summary rankings
- 2017 Alpine Skiing World Cup – Women's overall
- 2017 Alpine Skiing World Cup – Women's downhill
- 2017 Alpine Skiing World Cup – Women's super-G
- 2017 Alpine Skiing World Cup – Women's giant slalom
- 2017 Alpine Skiing World Cup – Women's slalom
