= 2017 Alpine Skiing World Cup – Women's downhill =

Alpine ski discipline year standings

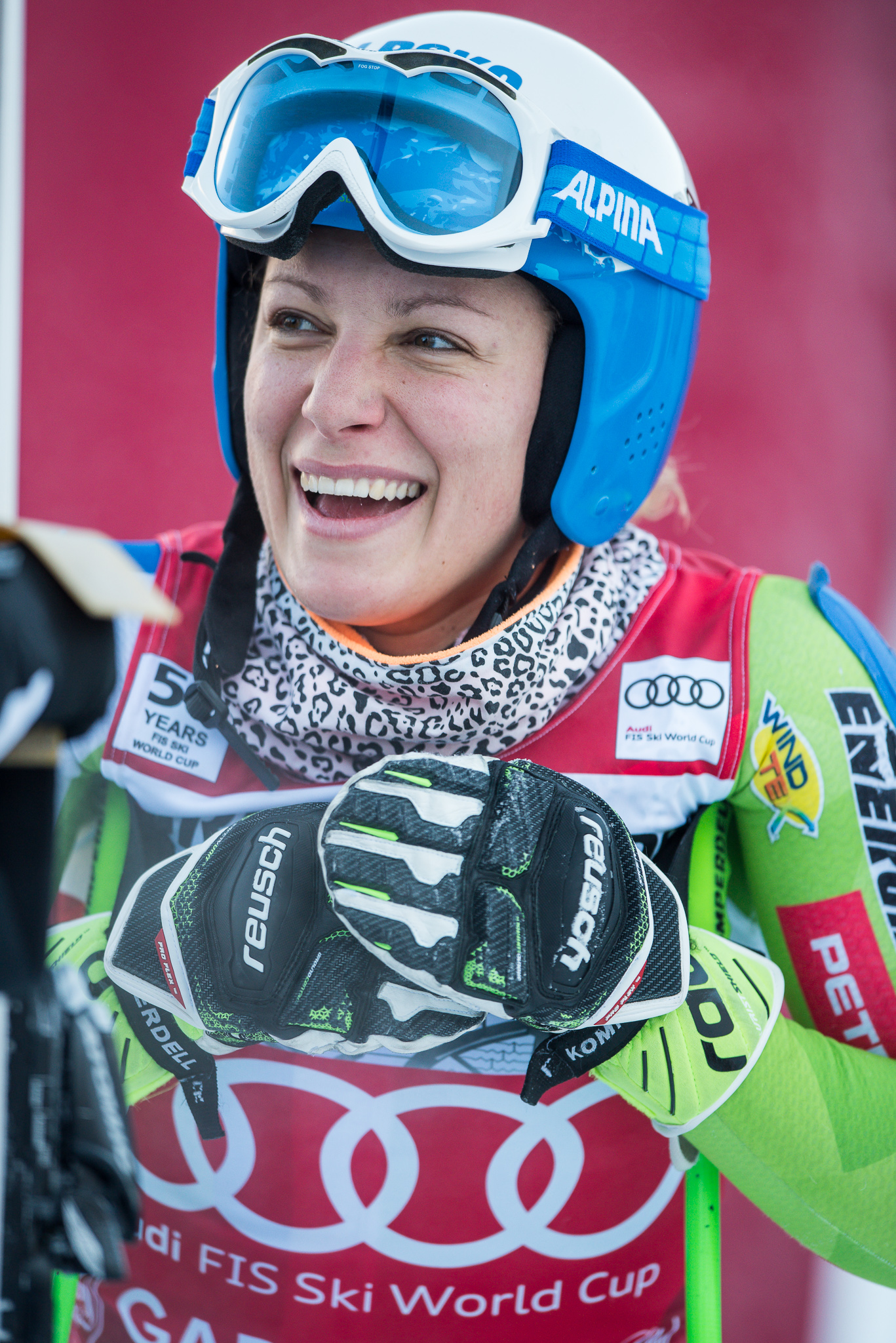
2017 Women's downhill World Cup: Ilka Štuhec of Slovenia, season champion; 2017 Women's World Cup; Overall • downhill • super-G; giant slalom • slalom • combined
Previous: 2016	Next: 2018

The women's downhill in the 2017 FIS Alpine Skiing World Cup involved eight events, including the season finale in Aspen, Colorado (USA). Defending champion (and eight-time discipline champion) Lindsey Vonn of the USA was injured during the first half of the season, leaving the championship race wide open. However, Slovenian skier Ilka Štuhec won the first three downhills of the season and ended up carrying a 97-point lead into the finals, meaning that all she needed was either to finish in the top 15 herself or for rising Italian skier Sofia Goggia, who was in second, not to win. As it turned out, Štuhec won the final herself, clinching the discipline title.

The season was interrupted by the 2017 World Ski Championships, which were held from 6–20 February in St. Moritz, Switzerland. The women's downhill was held on 12 February.

== Standings ==
#	Skier	2 Dec 2016; Lake Louise (Canada)	3 Dec 2016; Lake Louise (Canada)	17 Dec 2016; Val d'Isère (France)	15 Jan 2017; Altenmarkt-Zauchensee (Austria)	21 Jan 2017; Garmisch-Partenkirchen (Germany)	28 Jan 2017; Cortina d'Ampezzo (Italy)	4 Mar 2017; Jeongseon (South Korea)	15 Mar 2017; Aspen (United States)	Tot.
	(Slovenia) Ilka Štuhec	100	100	100	45	32	60	60	100	597
2	(Italy) Sofia Goggia	80	22	60	13	45	80	100	60	460
3	(Switzerland) Lara Gut	50	80	DNF	50	80	100	DNS		360
4	(United States) Lindsey Vonn	DNS			20	100	DNF	80	80	280
5	(Liechtenstein) Tina Weirather	18	29	32	80	29	18	DNF	50	256
6	(Italy) Johanna Schnarf	36	26	45	40	DNF	36	32	29	244
7	(Germany) Viktoria Rebensburg	45	16	DNS	DNF	60	50	18	32	221
8	(Austria) Nicole Schmidhofer	7	13	14	36	40	45	13	40	208
9	(United States) Laurenne Ross	29	36	DNS	22	13	9	50	45	204
10	(Austria) Christine Scheyer	13	8	29	100	DNF	DNS	20	26	196
11	(Sweden) Kajsa Kling	60	45	13	5	2	32	18	DNS	175
12	(Austria) Stephanie Venier	36	14	24	8	14	22	15	24	157
13	(United States) Stacey Cook	40	24	10	2	13	24	40	0	153
14	(United States) Jacqueline Wiles	8	1	9	60	5	14	24	18	139
15	(Switzerland) Corinne Suter	11	50	15	16	11	6	29	0	138
16	(Italy) Elena Fanchini	22	18	40	24	7	15	DNS		126
17	(Switzerland) Ramona Siebenhofer	16	DNF	26	3	50	DNF	10	20	125
18	(United States) Breezy Johnson	24	10	20	15	24	26	DNF	DNF	119
19	(Austria) Tamara Tippler	DNS			4	4	29	45	36	118
20	(Hungary) Edit Miklós	26	60	22	DNS					108
21	(Switzerland) Jasmine Flury	DNS		DNF	26	22	0	36	22	106
22	(Italy) Verena Stuffer	0	12	DNF	0	7	40	26	16	101
23	(Austria) Cornelia Hütter	14	0	80	DNS					94
	(Austria) Mirjam Puchner	15	40	8	13	15	3	DNS		94
25	(Italy) Nadia Fanchini	9	32	50	DNS					91
	References									

- Winner
- 2nd place
- 3rd place
- DNF = Did Not Finish
- DNS = Did Not Start
- Updated at 18 March 2017, after all events.

== See also ==
- 2017 Alpine Skiing World Cup – Women's summary rankings
- 2017 Alpine Skiing World Cup – Women's overall
- 2017 Alpine Skiing World Cup – Women's super-G
- 2017 Alpine Skiing World Cup – Women's giant slalom
- 2017 Alpine Skiing World Cup – Women's slalom
- 2017 Alpine Skiing World Cup – Women's combined
