= 2017 Alpine Skiing World Cup – Women's slalom =

Alpine ski discipline year standings

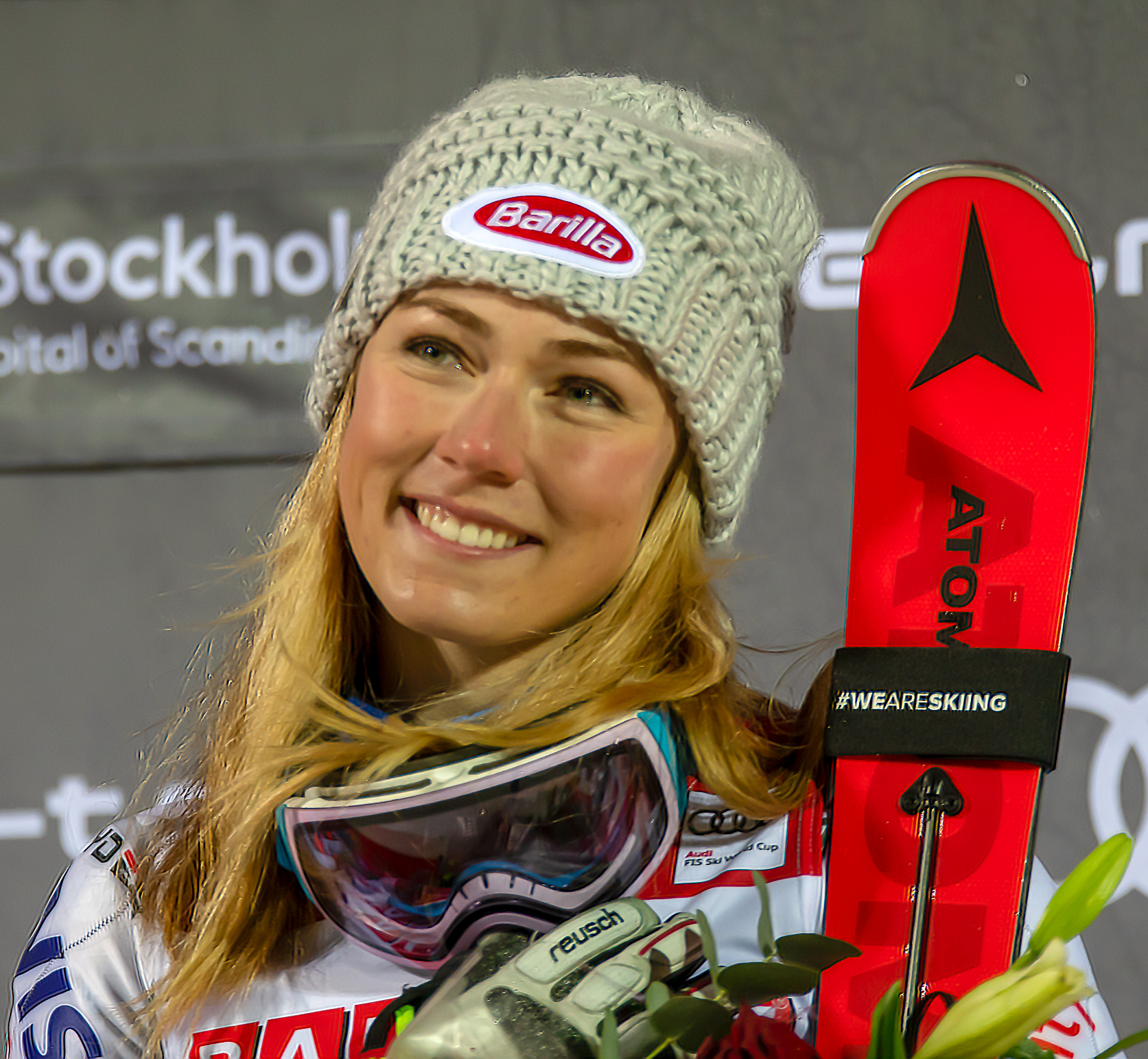
2017 Women's slalom World Cup: Mikaela Shiffrin of the USA, season champion; 2017 Women's World Cup; Overall • downhill • super-G; giant slalom • slalom • combined
Previous: 2016	Next: 2018

The women's slalom in the 2017 FIS Alpine Skiing World Cup involved 10 events, including one parallel slalom (a city event, which only allows for 16 competitors) and the season finale in Aspen, Colorado (USA).

Defending champion Mikaela Shiffrin from the United States won seven of the ten races for the season, podiumed in two more, and clinched the discipline title before the finals -- ultimately winning the season championship by over 250 points; this was Shiffrin's fourth discipline championship in slalom. Her win enabled Shiffrin to equal the record set by the great 1970s Swedish skier Ingemar Stenmark of winning four World Cup slalom season titles before the age of 22.

The season was interrupted by the 2017 World Ski Championships, which were held from 6–20 February in St. Moritz, Switzerland. The women's slalom was held on 18 February.

== Standings ==
Parallel Slalom (PS) or City Event (CE)

#	Skier	12 Nov 2016; Levi (Finland)	27 Nov 2016; Killington (United States)	11 Dec 2016; Sestriere (Italy)	29 Dec 2016; Semmering (Austria)	3 Jan 2017; Zagreb (Croatia)	8 Jan 2017; Maribor (Slovenia)	10 Jan 2017; Flachau (Austria)	31 Jan 2017; Stockholm (CE) (Sweden)	11 Mar 2017; Squaw Valley (United States)	17 Mar 2017; Aspen (United States)	Tot.
	(United States) Mikaela Shiffrin	100	100	100	100	DNF1	100	60	100	100	80	840
2	(Slovakia) Veronika Velez-Zuzulová	50	80	80	80	100	DNF1	45	80	DNF1	50	565
3	(Switzerland) Wendy Holdener	80	60	60	60	DNF1	80	60	15	DNF2	40	455
4	(Sweden) Frida Hansdotter	DNF2	26	50	36	50	60	100	50	DNQ	60	432
5	(Slovakia) Petra Vlhová	60	45	36	DNQ	80	50	DNF1	40	DNF2	100	411
6	(Czech Republic) Šárka Strachová	36	36	29	40	60	40	26	15	80	32	394
7	(Norway) Nina Løseth	32	50	45	50	DNF1	45	80	60	DNF1	DNF1	362
8	(Austria) Bernadette Schild	DNQ	32	26	45	45	32	36	15	60	29	320
9	(Italy) Chiara Costazza	DNF1	DNF2	6	32	32	29	22	40	45	DNF2	206
10	(Switzerland) Melanie Meillard	40	DNF2	24	16	DNF1	DNF2	20	40	10	45	195
11	(Sweden) Emelie Wikström	DNQ	15	22	DNF2	22	14	29	DNS	50	36	188
12	(Norway) Maren Skjøld	45	10	20	26	16	16	DNF1	DNS	22	22	177
13	(Austria) Katharina Truppe	16	16	15	DNF1	29	12	40	15	32	0	175
14	(Germany) Christina Geiger	DNQ	DSQ1	13	10	26	13	32	DNS	40	24	158
15	(Canada) Marie-Michèle Gagnon	14	18	DNQ	DNF2	40	22	DNF1	40	DNF2	18	152
16	(Switzerland) Michelle Gisin	29	12	40	22	DNF1	DNF2	14	DNS	24	DNF1	141
17	(Slovenia) Ana Bucik	13	20	DNF1	7	24	36	24	15	DNF1	0	139
18	(Italy) Irene Curtoni	11	22	18	24	DNF2	9	DNF2	DNS	29	20	133
19	(Germany) Lena Dürr	22	40	DNF2	6	18	10	18	DNS	DNF1	16	130
20	(United States) Resi Stiegler	15	14	16	DNF1	36	11	16	15	DNF1	0	123
21	(Germany) Marina Wallner	12	DNQ	12	DNS	DNQ	7	8	DNS	36	26	101
22	(Switzerland) Denise Feierabend	10	8	DNF1	4	20	DNQ	10	15	20	0	87
23	(Sweden) Maria Pietilä-Holmner	24	24	32	DNS					DNF1	0	80
	(Canada) Erin Mielzynski	8	9	10	29	DNQ	15	9	DNS	DNF1	DNF1	80
25	(France) Adeline Baud Mugnier	DNF1	13	2	20	DNF1	24	DNF1	15	DNF2	DNF1	74
	References											

- Winner
- 2nd place
- 3rd place
- DNF1 = Did Not Finish run 1
- DSQ1 = Disqualified run 1
- DNQ = Did not qualify for run 2
- DNF2 = Did Not Finish run 2
- DSQ2 = Disqualified run 2
- DNS = Did Not Start
- Updated at 19 March 2017, after all events.

== See also ==
- 2017 Alpine Skiing World Cup – Women's summary rankings
- 2017 Alpine Skiing World Cup – Women's overall
- 2017 Alpine Skiing World Cup – Women's downhill
- 2017 Alpine Skiing World Cup – Women's super-G
- 2017 Alpine Skiing World Cup – Women's giant slalom
- 2017 Alpine Skiing World Cup – Women's combined
