= 2017 Alpine Skiing World Cup – Women's overall =

Alpine ski discipline year standings

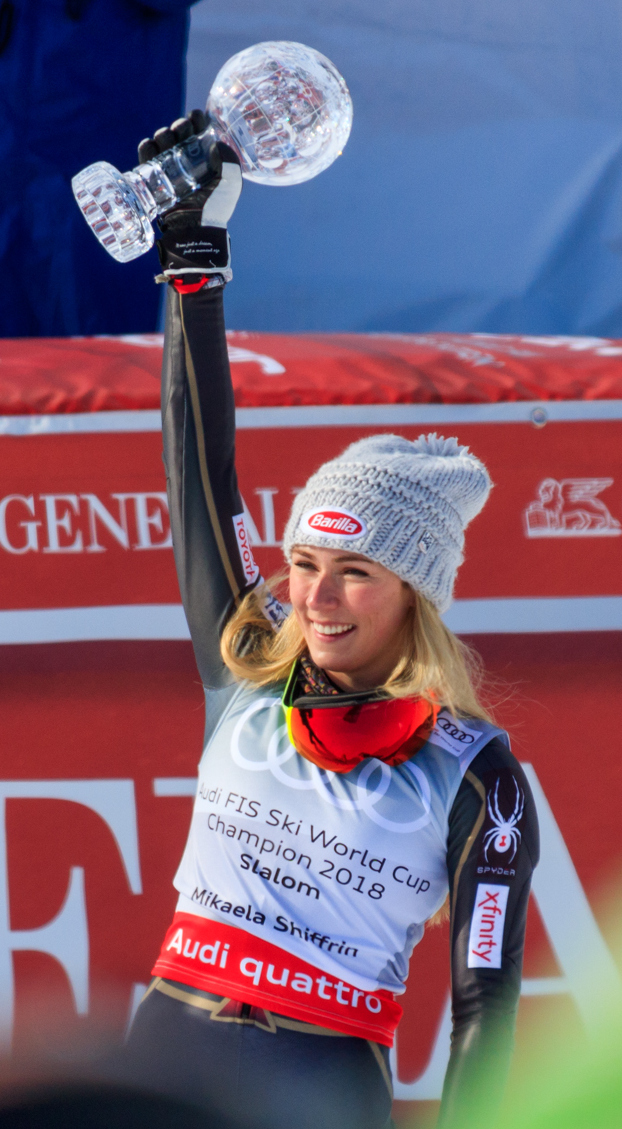
2017 women's overall World Cup: Mikaela Shiffrin of USA, season champion; 2017 women's World Cup; Overall • downhill • super-g; giant slalom • slalom• combined
| Previous: 2016 | Next: 2018 |

The women's overall in the 2017 FIS Alpine Skiing World Cup involved 37 events in 5 disciplines: downhill (DH), Super-G (SG), giant slalom (GS), slalom (SL) [which included one city event], and Alpine combined (AC) [which included one super-combined]. A city event is a slalom conducted on a two-lane artificial ramp erected in a city; a super-combined consists of a downhill followed by a one-run slalom, as opposed to an Alpine combined, which consist of a Super-G followed by a one-run slalom.

Injuries affected several of the former overall champions at the start of the season. Two-time champion Anna Veith (née Fenninger) (2014-15) and four-time champion Lindsey Vonn (2008-09-10, '12) both missed the first half of the season due to injuries suffered during the previous season. Veith also missed the end of the season to recover further from her injuries. In addition, after a great start to the season, defending overall champion Lara Gut suffered a season-ending injury during the 2017 World Championships in early February, costing her a chance to repeat.

As noted, the season was interrupted by the 2017 World Ski Championships, which were held from 6–20 February in St. Moritz, Switzerland.

At the end of the season, Mikaela Shiffrin, who also won the slalom discipline for the fourth time and was second in the giant slalom discipline, became the third American woman and fifth American overall to win the overall World Cup championship for a season, joining former men's champions Phil Mahre (1981-82-83) and Bode Miller (2005, '08) and women's champions Tamara McKinney (1983) and Vonn.

The season finals were held in Aspen, Colorado for the first time -- and the first time in the United States since Vail, Colorado was the host in 1997, twenty years prior.

== Standings ==
| # | Skier | DH; 8 races | SG; 7 races | GS; 9 races | SL; 10 races | AC; 3 races | Tot. |
| | (United States) Mikaela Shiffrin | 33 | 70 | 600 | 840 | 100 | 1,643 |
| 2 | (Slovenia) Ilka Štuhec | 597 | 430 | 32 | 26 | 240 | 1,325 |
| 3 | (Italy) Sofia Goggia | 460 | 240 | 405 | 0 | 92 | 1,197 |
| 4 | (Switzerland) Lara Gut | 360 | 300 | 360 | 3 | 0 | 1,023 |
| 5 | (Italy) Federica Brignone | 69 | 222 | 370 | 14 | 220 | 895 |
| 6 | (France) Tessa Worley | 0 | 167 | 685 | 0 | 18 | 870 |
| 7 | (Liechtenstein) Tina Weirather | 256 | 435 | 166 | 0 | 0 | 857 |
| 8 | (Switzerland) Wendy Holdener | 0 | 4 | 93 | 455 | 140 | 692 |
| 9 | (Germany) Viktoria Rebensburg | 221 | 153 | 277 | 0 | 0 | 651 |
| 10 | (Slovakia) Petra Vlhová | 0 | 0 | 178 | 411 | 0 | 589 |
| 11 | (Slovakia) Veronika Velez-Zuzulová | 0 | 0 | 0 | 565 | 0 | 565 |
| 12 | (Norway) Nina Løseth | 0 | 0 | 157 | 362 | 0 | 519 |
| 13 | (Sweden) Frida Hansdotter | 0 | 0 | 36 | 432 | 0 | 468 |
| 14 | (Canada) Marie-Michèle Gagnon | 0 | 44 | 156 | 152 | 100 | 452 |
| 15 | (Austria) Nicole Schmidhofer | 208 | 240 | 0 | 0 | 0 | 448 |
| 16 | (Austria) Stephanie Venier | 157 | 255 | 0 | 0 | 22 | 434 |
| 17 | (Italy) Elena Curtoni | 53 | 271 | 73 | 0 | 29 | 426 |
| 18 | (Italy) Marta Bassino | 0 | 30 | 354 | 0 | 29 | 413 |
| 19 | (United States) Lindsey Vonn | 280 | 131 | 0 | 0 | 0 | 411 |
| 20 | (Norway) Ragnhild Mowinckel | 56 | 88 | 188 | 0 | 67 | 399 |
| 21 | (Czech Republic) Šárka Strachová | 0 | 0 | 0 | 394 | 0 | 394 |
| 22 | (Sweden) Kajsa Kling | 175 | 156 | 38 | 0 | 14 | 383 |
| 23 | (Austria) Bernadette Schild | 0 | 0 | 51 | 320 | 0 | 371 |
| 24 | (Italy) Johanna Schnarf | 244 | 92 | 0 | 0 | 16 | 352 |
| 25 | (United States) Laurenne Ross | 204 | 113 | 0 | 0 | 26 | 343 |
| | (Austria) Christine Scheyer | 196 | 123 | 0 | 0 | 24 | 343 |

- Leader
- 2nd place
- 3rd place
- Updated at 19 March 2017, after all events

== See also ==
- 2017 Alpine SKiing World Cup – Women's summary rankings
- 2017 Alpine Skiing World Cup – Women's downhill
- 2017 Alpine Skiing World Cup – Women's super-G
- 2017 Alpine Skiing World Cup – Women's giant slalom
- 2017 Alpine Skiing World Cup – Women's slalom
- 2017 Alpine Skiing World Cup – Women's combined
- 2017 Alpine Skiing World Cup – Men's overall
