= 2017 Alpine Skiing World Cup – Women's giant slalom =

Alpine ski discipline year standings

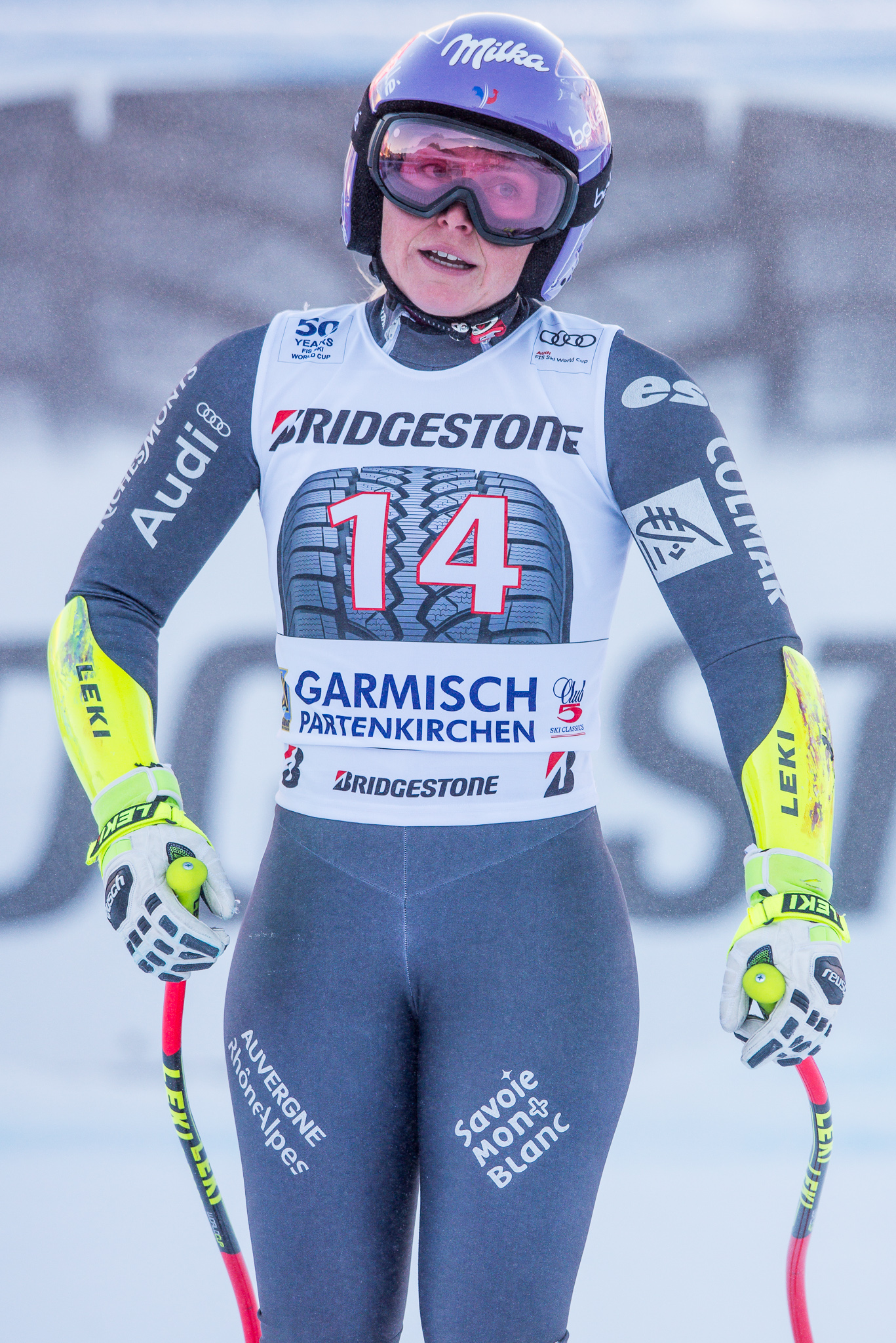
2017 Women's giant slalom World Cup: Tessa Worley of France, season champion; 2017 Women's World Cup; Overall • downhill • super-G; giant slalom • slalom • combined
Previous: 2016	Next: 2018

The women's giant slalom in the 2017 FIS Alpine Skiing World Cup consisted of nine events, including the World Cup finals in Aspen, Colorado (USA). Tessa Worley of France had never won a season-long championship in the World Cup but this season had reached the giant slalom podium seven times, including three wins, and held an 80-point lead over runner-up Mikaela Shiffrin of the US in the standings before the finals. In the finals, Worley finished fifth (one spot ahead of Shiffrin) and became a first-time discipline champion.

The season was interrupted by the 2017 World Ski Championships, which were held from 6–20 February in St. Moritz, Switzerland. The women's giant slalom was held on 16 February.

== Standings ==
#	Skier	22 Oct 2016; Sölden (Austria)	26 Nov 2016; Killington (United States)	10 Dec 2016; Sestriere (Italy)	27 Dec 2016; Semmering (Austria)	27 Dec 2016; Semmering (Austria)	7 Jan 2017; Maribor (Slovenia)	24 Jan 2017; Kronplatz (Italy)	10 Mar 2017; Squaw Valley (United States)	19 Mar 2017; Aspen (United States)	Tot.
	(France) Tessa Worley	40	100	100	80	80	100	80	60	45	685
2	(United States) Mikaela Shiffrin	80	45	40	100	100	50	45	100	40	600
3	(Italy) Sofia Goggia	45	60	80	DNF1	DNF1	80	24	36	80	405
4	(Italy) Federica Brignone	29	32	DNF1	DNF1	29	DNF1	100	80	100	370
5	(Switzerland) Lara Gut	100	DNF1	60	50	40	60	50	DNS		360
6	(Italy) Marta Bassino	60	50	45	45	5	DNF2	60	29	60	354
7	(Germany) Viktoria Rebensburg	DNS	12	8	36	60	45	26	40	50	277
8	(Slovenia) Ana Drev	26	40	29	40	7	32	4	45	16	239
9	(Italy) Manuela Mölgg	11	11	18	60	32	36	18	50	DNF2	236
10	(Norway) Ragnhild Mowinckel	5	24	DNF1	29	50	40	14	26	0	188
11	(Slovakia) Petra Vlhová	32	20	9	32	20	DNQ	7	22	36	178
12	(Austria) Stephanie Brunner	50	DNF2	32	16	45	DNF1	DNF1	32	DNF1	175
13	(Liechtenstein) Tina Weirather	16	22	50	22	18	DNF1	DNQ	12	26	166
14	(Norway) Nina Løseth	3	80	DNF1	26	15	DNF1	13	DNQ	20	157
15	(Canada) Marie-Michèle Gagnon	14	DNF2	10	18	36	29	9	18	22	156
16	(Switzerland) Simone Wild	8	16	36	13	12	14	20	14	18	151
17	(France) Coralie Frasse Sombet	24	DNF1	20	9	24	26	DNF1	9	29	141
18	(Austria) Michaela Kirchgasser	36	15	13	14	22	7	3	24	0	134
19	(Italy) Francesca Marsaglia	6	36	16	12	10	22	11	DNF1	DNF1	113
20	(Switzerland) Melanie Meillard	13	DNF2	26	DNQ	DNQ	11	15	13	32	110
21	(Sweden) Sara Hector	DNS					24	40	16	26	106
22	(Switzerland) Wendy Holdener	15	13	11	8	3	15	8	20	0	93
23	(France) Adeline Baud-Mugnier	DNQ	26	12	24	11	13	DNF2	DNF1	0	86
24	(Austria) Katharina Truppe	18	6	24	DNF2	8	DNF2	22	7	0	85
25	(Italy) Irene Curtoni	DNQ	29	5	DNF2	DNF2	4	32	10	0	80
	References										

- Winner
- 2nd place
- 3rd place
- DNF1 = Did not finish run 1
- DSQ1 = Disqualified run 1
- DNQ = Did not qualify for run 2
- DNF2 = Did not finish run 2
- DSQ2 = Disqualified run 2
- DNS = Did not start
- Updated at 19 March 2017, after all events.

== See also ==
- 2017 Alpine Skiing World Cup – Women's summary rankings
- 2017 Alpine Skiing World Cup – Women's overall
- 2017 Alpine Skiing World Cup – Women's downhill
- 2017 Alpine Skiing World Cup – Women's super-G
- 2017 Alpine Skiing World Cup – Women's slalom
- 2017 Alpine Skiing World Cup – Women's combined
