= 2017 Alpine Skiing World Cup – Women's super-G =

Alpine ski discipline year standings

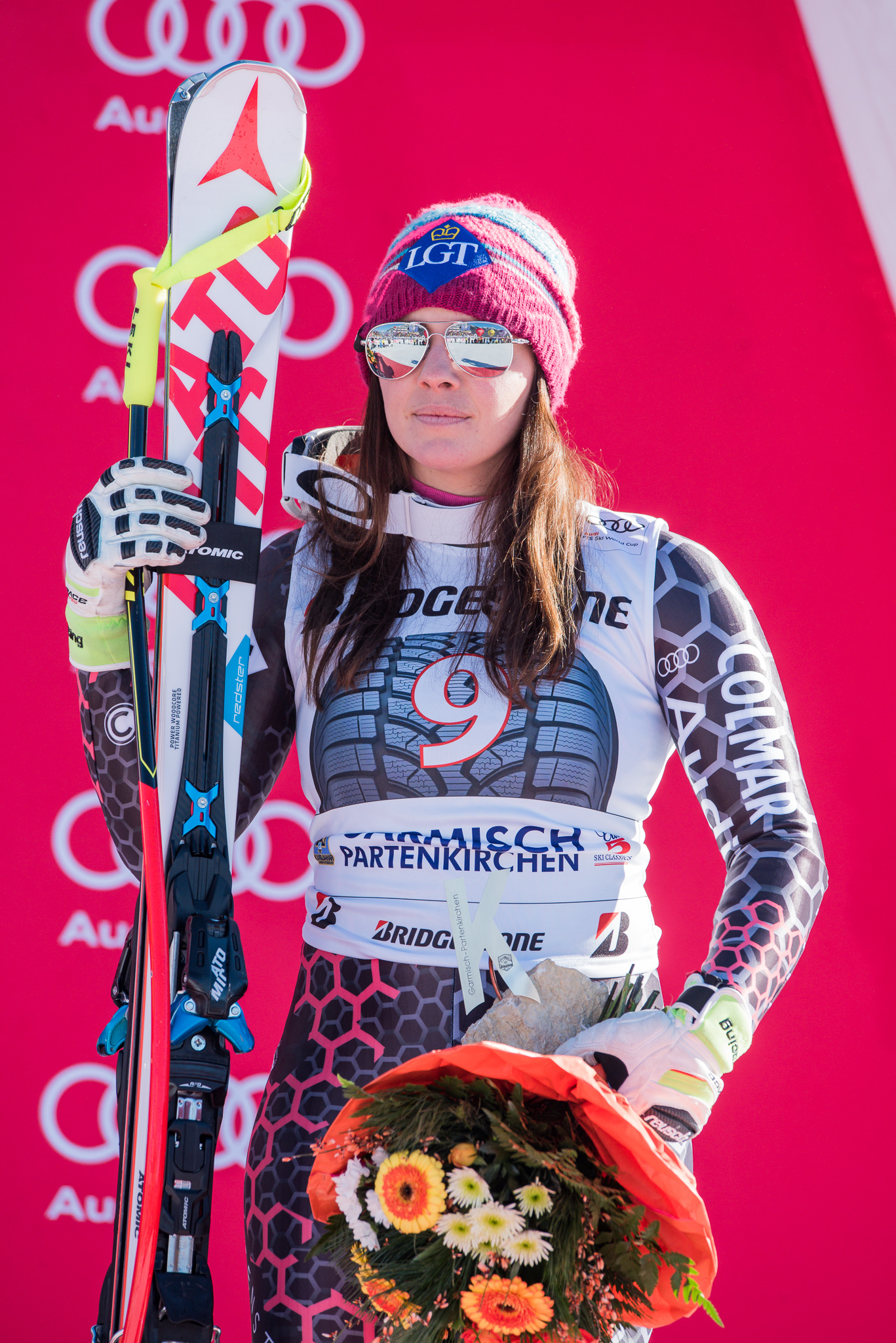
2017 Women's Super-G World Cup: Tina Weirather of Liechtenstein, season champion; 2017 Women's World Cup; Overall • Downhill • Super-G; Giant slalom • Slalom • Combined
Previous: 2016	Next: 2018

The women's super-G in the 2017 FIS Alpine Skiing World Cup involved seven events, including the season final in Aspen, Colorado (USA). Defending discipline (and overall) champion Lara Gut from Switzerland got off to a great start by winning the first three races, but she suffered a season-ending injury in early February, which led to a tight battle between the two top contenders remaining: Slovenia's Ilka Štuhec and Liechtenstein's Tina Weirather. With just the season finals in Aspen remaining, Štuhec, who had won two races in the discipline and won the season title in the downhill the day before the race, held a 15-point lead over Weirather, but Weirather nipped Štuhec by 0.35 seconds in the finals, giving her the season title by 5 points.

Weirather thus became a second-generation World Cup discipline champion, as her father Harti Weirather was World Cup downhill discipline champion in 1981 and her mother Hanni Wenzel won the overall World Cup championship twice (1978, '80). Weirather and her mother also became the first mother-daughter pair to win season trophies in the 51 years of FIS Alpine skiing World Cup competition.

The season was interrupted by the 2017 World Ski Championships, which were held from 6–20 February in St. Moritz, Switzerland. The women's super-G was held on 7 February.

== Standings ==
#	Skier	4 Dec 2016; Lake Louise (Canada)	18 Dec 2016; Val d'Isère (France)	22 Jan 2017; Garmisch-Partenkirchen (Germany)	29 Jan 2017; Cortina d'Ampezzo (Italy)	25 Feb 2017; Crans Montana (Switzerland)	5 Mar 2017; Jeongseon (South Korea)	16 Mar 2017; Aspen (United States)	Tot.
	(Liechtenstein) Tina Weirather	80	80	60	36	50	29	100	435
2	(Slovenia) Ilka Štuhec	45	36	9	100	100	60	80	430
3	(Switzerland) Lara Gut	100	100	100	DNF	DNS			300
4	(Switzerland) Elena Curtoni	7	60	40	32	80	26	26	271
5	(Austria) Stephanie Venier	5	40	80	40	60	8	22	255
6	(Italy) Sofia Goggia	60	DNF	DNF	80	DNF	100	DNF	240
	(Austria) Nicole Schmidhofer	32	26	50	18	32	32	50	240
8	(Italy) Federica Brignone	4	11	36	16	45	50	60	222
9	(France) Tessa Worley	0	45	45	24	24	DNS	29	167
10	(Sweden) Kajsa Kling	50	0	32	29	40	5	DNS	156
11	(Germany) Viktoria Rebensburg	40	DNF	DNF	45	DNF	36	32	153
12	(United States) Lindsey Vonn	DNS		29	22	DNF	80	DNF	131
13	(Switzerland) Corinne Suter	36	12	22	2	18	10	24	124
14	(Austria) Christine Scheyer	16	16	20	DNS	15	20	36	123
15	(Italy) Francesca Marsaglia	9	29	26	9	14	16	18	121
16	(Austria) Elisabeth Görgl	0	6	18	DSQ	36	11	45	116
17	(United States) Laurenne Ross	18	13	16	26	DNF	40	DNF	113
18	(Austria) Ricarda Haaser	DNS		26	16	1	12	40	95
19	(Italy) Johanna Schnarf	14	14	15	13	12	24	DNF	92
20	(Norway) Ragnhild Mowinckel	2	20	DNF	2	29	15	20	88
21	(Italy) Nadia Fanchini	29	50	DNS					79
22	(Switzerland) Jasmine Flury	DNS	24	DNF	5	DNF	45	DNF	74
23	(Switzerland) Joana Hählen	DNS	32	8	4	5	6	16	71
24	(United States) Mikaela Shiffrin	0	DNS		50	20	DNS		70
25	(France) Tiffany Gauthier	0	9	DNS	11	26	18	DNF	64
26	(Austria) Anna Veith	DNS		DNF	60	DNS			60
	References								

- Winner
- 2nd place
- 3rd place
- DNF = Did Not Finish
- DSQ = Disqualified
- DNS = Did Not Start
- Updated at 19 March 2017, after all events.

== See also ==
- 2017 Alpine Skiing World Cup – Women's summary rankings
- 2017 Alpine Skiing World Cup – Women's overall
- 2017 Alpine Skiing World Cup – Women's downhill
- 2017 Alpine Skiing World Cup – Women's giant slalom
- 2017 Alpine Skiing World Cup – Women's slalom
- 2017 Alpine Skiing World Cup – Women's combined
