= Sara Hector =

Swedish alpine skier (born 1992)

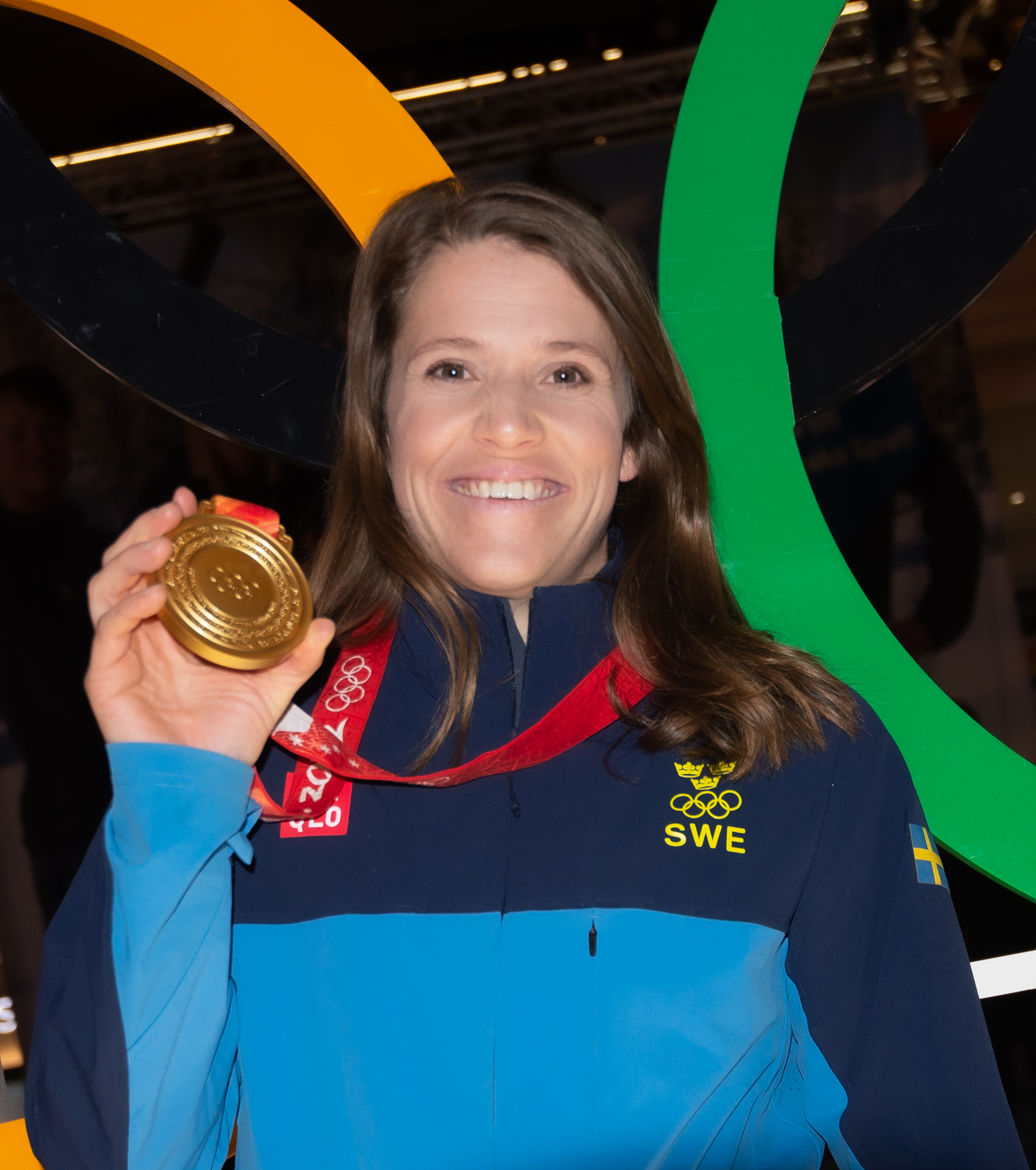
- Olympic gold in GS at Beijing (2022)

Personal information
- Born: 4 September 1992 (age 34) Sandviken, Sweden
- Height: 1.67 m (5 ft 6 in)

Skiing career
- Country: Sweden
- Sport: Alpine skiing
- Club: Kungsbergets AK
- Disciplines: Giant slalom, slalom
- World Cup debut: 12 December 2009 (age 17)

Olympics
- Teams: 4 – (2014, 2018, 2022, 2026)
- Medals: 2 (1 gold)

World Championships
- Teams: 8 – (2011–2025)
- Medals: 4 (0 gold)

World Cup
- Seasons: 18 – (2010–2027)
- Wins: 8 – (8 GS)
- Podiums: 29 – (25 GS, 4 SL)
- Overall titles: 0 – (4th in 2024)
- Discipline titles: 0 – (2nd in GS, 2022)
Medal record
Women's alpine skiing
Representing Sweden
World Cup race podiums
Event	1st	2nd	3rd
Slalom	0	1	2
Giant slalom	8	8	9
Total	8	9	11
International alpine ski competitions
Event	1st	2nd	3rd
Olympic Games	1	1	0
World Championships	0	1	3
Total	1	2	3
Olympic Games
Gold medal – first place	2022 Beijing	Giant slalom
Silver medal – second place	2026 Milano Cortina	Giant slalom
World Championships
Silver medal – second place	2021 Cortina d’Ampezzo	Team event
Bronze medal – third place	2011 Garmisch-Partenkirchen	Team event
Bronze medal – third place	2015 Beaver Creek	Team event
Bronze medal – third place	2025 Saalbach	Team event
Junior World Championships
Gold medal – first place	2011 Crans-Montana	Giant slalom
Silver medal – second place	2012 Roccaraso	Giant slalom
Bronze medal – third place	2010 Les Planards	Slalom

Sara Maria Hector (born 4 September 1992) is a Swedish World Cup alpine ski racer who is the 2022 Olympic champion in giant slalom. She has competed at seven World Championships and won four medals in the team event (2011, 2015, 2021, 2025).

Hector gained her first World Cup victory in December 2014, a giant slalom in Kühtai, Austria. At her third Winter Olympics in 2022, she was the gold medalist in giant slalom, which was her first Olympic medal and the first Olympic gold for Sweden in the women's GS event in thirty years. She was the flag bearer for Sweden during the opening ceremony of the 2026 Winter Olympics along with Walter Wallberg.

Hector won the silver medal in the giant slalom at the 2026 Winter Olympics.

== World Cup results ==
=== Season standings ===
Season
Season	Age	Overall	Slalom	Giant slalom	Super-G	Downhill	Combined	Parallel
2010	17	120	—	45	—	—	—	—N/a
2011	18	93	—	32	—	—	—	—N/a
2012	19	102	—	41	—	—	—	—N/a
2013	20	80	48	37	47	—	—	—N/a
2014	21	61	—	26	—	—	5	—N/a
2015	22	19	29	4	—	—	—	—N/a
2016	23	64	38	27	—	—	—	—N/a
2017	24	66	54	21	—	—	—	—N/a
2018	25	49	57	10	—	—	—	—N/a
2019	26	45	32	15	—	—	—	—N/a
2020	27	33	28	12	—	—	—	16
2021	28	16	13	11	—	—	—N/a	4
2022	29	7	12	2nd place, silver medalist(s)	—	—	—N/a	5
2023	30	10	9	6	—	—	—N/a	—N/a
2024	31	4	6	3rd place, bronze medalist(s)	—	—	—N/a	—N/a
2025	32	5	9	3rd place, bronze medalist(s)	—	—	—N/a	—N/a
2026	33	9	10	3rd place, bronze medalist(s)	—	—	—N/a	—N/a
2027	34	5	13	4	—	—	—N/a	—N/a

Standings through 16 November 2026

=== Race podiums ===
- 8 wins – (8 GS)
- 29 podiums – (25 GS, 4 SL)

Season
Season	Date	Location	Discipline	Place
2015	12 December 2014	Åre, Sweden	Giant slalom	2nd
2015	28 December 2014	Kühtai in Tirol, Austria	Giant slalom	1st
2021	12 December 2020	Courchevel, France	Giant slalom	2nd
2022	21 December 2021	Courchevel, France	Giant slalom	2nd
2022	22 December 2021	Courchevel, France	Giant slalom	1st
2022	28 December 2021	Lienz, Austria	Giant slalom	3rd
2022	8 January 2022	Kranjska Gora, Slovenia	Giant slalom	1st
2022	25 January 2022	Kronplatz, Italy	Giant slalom	1st
2022	6 March 2022	Lenzerheide, Switzerland	Giant slalom	3rd
2023	26 November 2022	Killington, United States	Giant slalom	3rd
2023	10 December 2022	Sestriere, Italy	Giant slalom	2nd
2023	25 January 2023	Kronplatz, Italy	Giant slalom	3rd
2023	10 March 2023	Åre, Sweden	Giant slalom	3rd
2024	29 December 2023	Lienz, Austria	Giant slalom	3rd
2024	16 January 2024	Flachau, Austria	Slalom	3rd
2024	20 January 2024	Jasná, Slovakia	Giant slalom	1st
2024	30 January 2024	Kronplatz, Italy	Giant slalom	2nd
2024	9 March 2024	Åre, Sweden	Giant slalom	2nd
2025	30 November 2024	Killington, United States	Giant slalom	1st
2025	28 December 2024	Semmering, Austria	Giant slalom	2nd
2025	4 January 2025	Kranjska Gora, Slovenia	Giant slalom	1st
2025	14 January 2025	Flachau, Austria	Slalom	3rd
2025	30 January 2025	Courchevel, France	Slalom	2nd
2025	25 March 2025	Sun Valley, United States	Giant slalom	3rd
2026	7 December 2025	Tremblant, Canada	Giant slalom	2nd
2026	27 December 2025	Semmering, Austria	Giant slalom	3rd
2026	20 January 2026	Kronplatz, Italy	Giant slalom	3rd
2026	24 January 2026	Špindlerův Mlýn, Czech Republic	Giant slalom	1st
2027	21 November 2026	Gurgl, Austria	Slalom	2nd

== World Championship results ==
Year
Year	Age	Slalom	Giant slalom	Super-G	Downhill	Combined	Team; Combined	Parallel	Team; Event
2011	18	—	17	—	—	—	—N/a	—N/a	3
2013	20	—	DNF2	DNS	26	9	—N/a	—N/a	—
2015	22	23	10	—	—	—	—N/a	—N/a	3
2017	24	—	9	—	—	—	—N/a	—N/a	—
2019	26	—	7	—	—	—	—N/a	—N/a	—
2021	28	13	DNF2	—	—	—	—N/a	—	2
2023	30	7	13	—	—	—	—N/a	8	11
2025	32	DNF2	6	—	—	—N/a	—	—N/a	3

== Olympic results ==
Year
Year	Age	Slalom	Giant slalom	Super-G	Downhill	Combined	Team combined	Team event
2014	21	—	—	21	25	13	—N/a	—N/a
2018	25	—	10	—	—	—	—N/a	—
2022	29	DNF2	1	—	—	—	—N/a	—
2026	33	DNF2	2	—	—	—N/a	—	—N/a
