= Marta Bassino =

Italian alpine skier

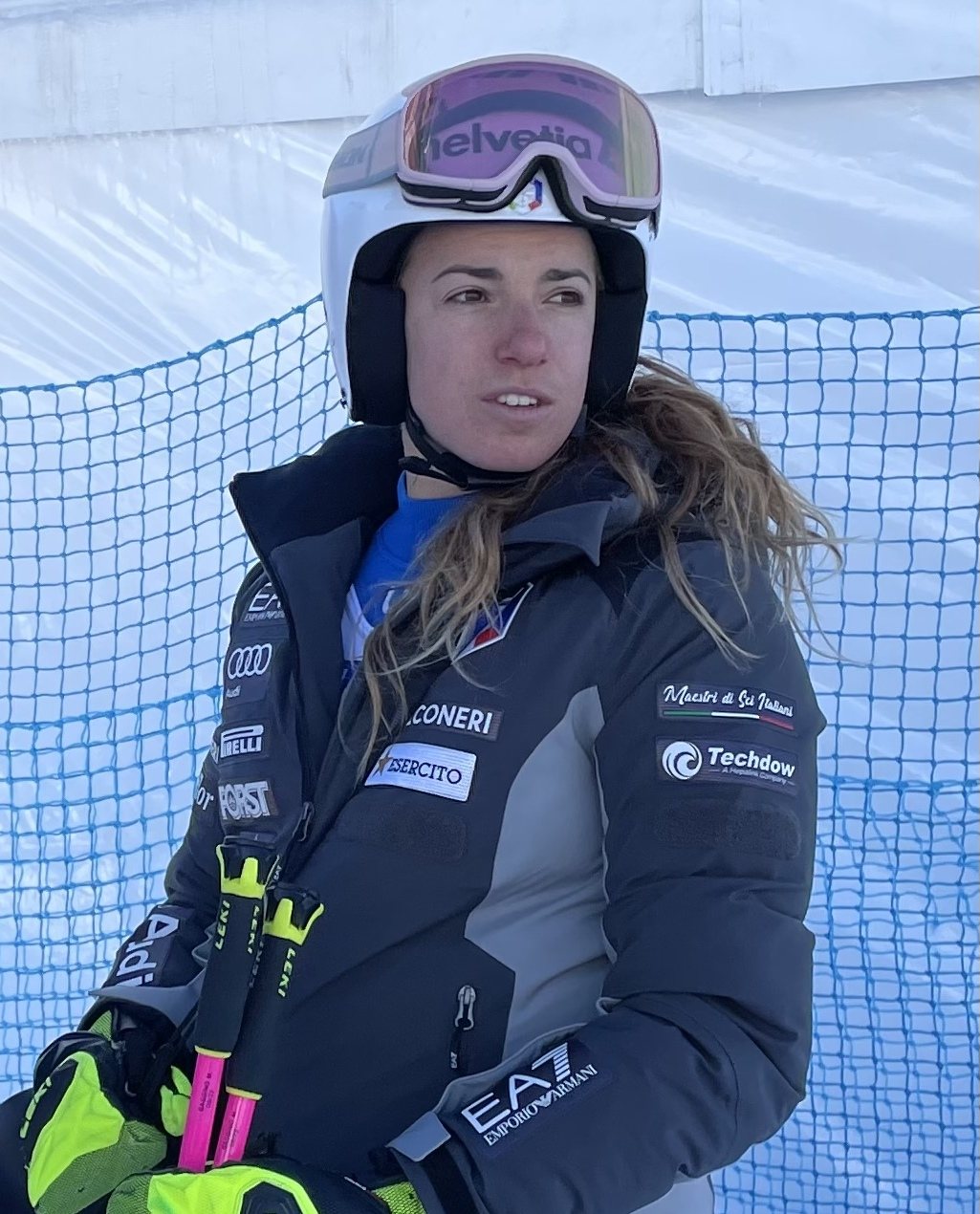
- At Sestriere in December 2022

Personal information
- Born: 27 February 1996 (age 30) Cuneo, Piedmont, Italy
- Height: 1.67 m (5 ft 6 in)
- Website: martabassino.com

Skiing career
- Country: Italy
- Sport: Alpine skiing
- Club: CS Esercito
- Disciplines: Giant slalom, super-G, combined, downhill, slalom
- World Cup debut: 16 March 2014 (age 18)

Olympics
- Teams: 2 − (2018, 2022)
- Medals: 0

World Championships
- Teams: 6 − (2015–2025)
- Medals: 3 (2 gold)

World Cup
- Seasons: 11 − (2014–2024)
- Wins: 7 − (6 GS, 1 DH)
- Podiums: 30 − (20 GS, 5 SG, 2 AC, 2 DH, 1 PGS)
- Overall titles: 0 − (5th in 2020)
- Discipline titles: 1 − (GS, 2021)
Medal record
Women's alpine skiing
Representing Italy
World Cup race podiums
Event	1st	2nd	3rd
Giant slalom	6	5	9
Downhill	1	1	0
Super-G	0	2	3
Combined	0	1	1
Parallel	0	0	1
Total	7	9	14
International competitions
Event	1st	2nd	3rd
Olympic Games	0	0	0
World Championships	2	0	1
Junior World Championships	1	0	0
Total	3	0	1
World Championships
Gold medal – first place	2021 Cortina d'Ampezzo	Parallel
Gold medal – first place	2023 Méribel	Super-G
Bronze medal – third place	2019 Åre	Team event
Junior World Championships
Gold medal – first place	2014 Jasná	Giant slalom

Marta Bassino (born 27 February 1996) is an Italian World Cup alpine ski racer. She competes in all disciplines, with a focus in giant slalom, in which she has six World Cup wins.

== Biography ==
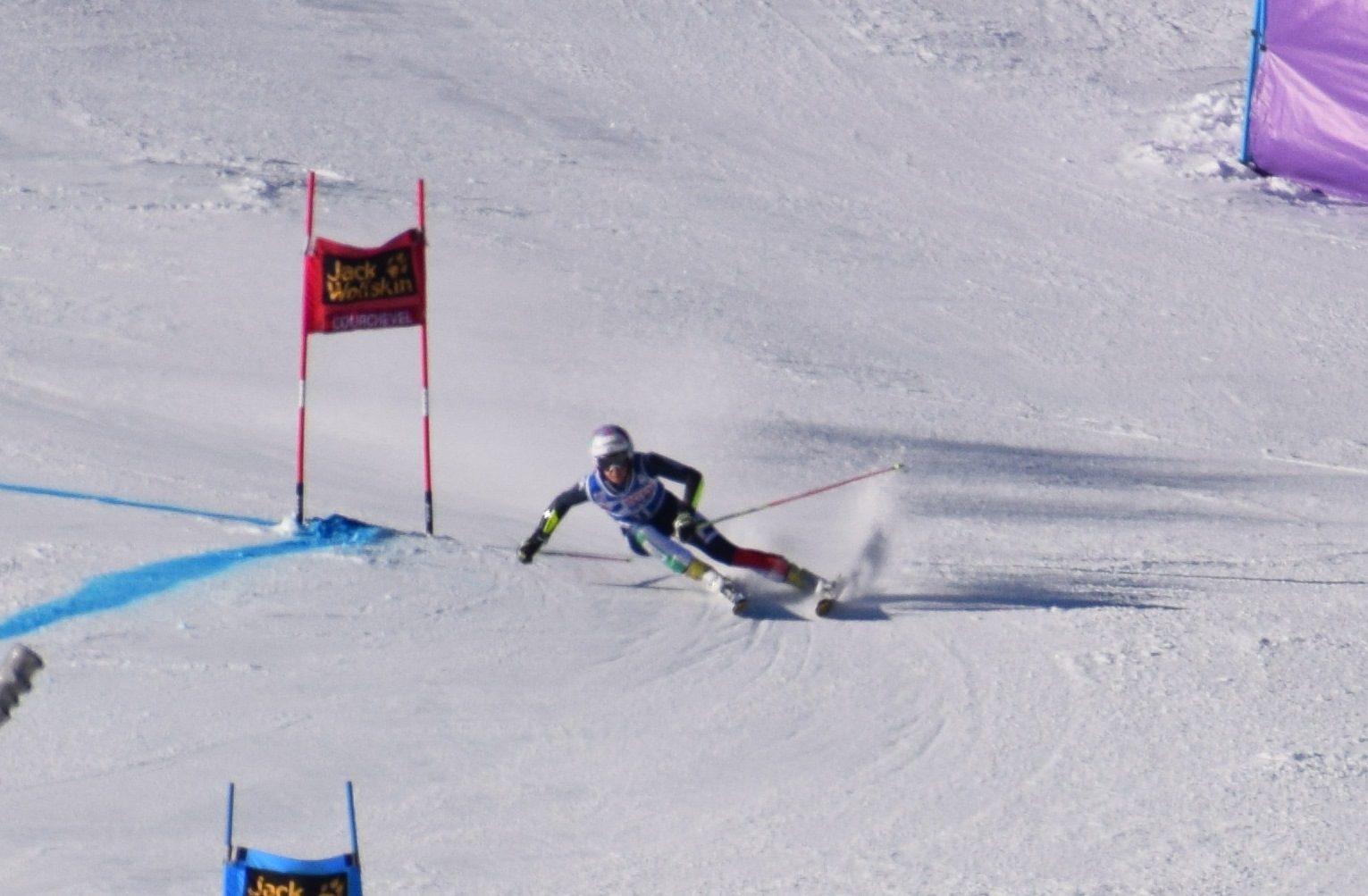
Bassino in Courchevel giant slalom in December 2015

Born in Cuneo, Piedmont, Bassino lives in Borgo San Dalmazzo.

At the Junior World Championships in 2014, Bassino won the gold medal in the giant slalom on her eighteenth birthday in late February. This win granted her an automatic start at the giant slalom of the World Cup finals in mid-March, which was her World Cup debut. The next season was her first on the World Cup circuit.

== Career ==
In October 2016, she scored her first World Cup podium at Sölden, finishing third in the giant slalom won by Switzerland's Lara Gut; later in the season she repeated the same result in the giant slaloms in Kronplatz and Aspen - the letter together with teammates Federica Brignone and Sofia Goggia. Bassino was also part of the podium in Bansko in 2020, when Italian athletes took the top three places in the women's downhill.

Her first win was in a giant slalom at Killington in November 2019. In that year Bassino became the first Italian skier able to get on the podium in five different disciplines in the same season.

At her first World Championships in 2015, Bassino took part in the giant slalom, qualifying for the second run in 8th place, but did not finish. At the Worlds in 2017 in St. Moritz, she finished eleventh in the giant slalom and 17th in the combined. At her first Winter Olympics in 2018 at Pyeongchang, Bassino was fifth in the giant slalom, tenth in the combined, but did not finish the first run of the slalom. In 2019 at Åre, she won a bronze medal in the team race (participating as a reserve) and was 13th in both the giant slalom and combined.

In the 2020–21 season, Bassino won four of the first five giant slalom races contested, also finishing on the podium in the sixth one – a third place in the home event in Kronplatz, Italy. She clinched the women's World Cup crystal globe in the discipline on 7 March 2021, prior to the finals. At the 2021 World Championships in Cortina d'Ampezzo, Italy, Bassino won the gold medal in the parallel giant slalom event, alongside Austria's Katharina Liensberger. She was a strong favourite for the giant slalom race, however, she finished in 13th place.

On Tuesday, October 21, 2025, Marta Bassino was injured during training in Val Senales, fracturing the lateral tibial plateau of her left leg and reinserting the medial collateral ligament of her knee. The injury put her Olympic season at risk, and she was ultimately unable to compete.

== World Cup results ==
=== Season titles ===
- 1 title – (1 GS)

Season	
Season	Discipline
2021	Giant slalom

=== Season standings ===
Season
Season	Age	Overall	Slalom	Giant slalom	Super-G	Downhill	Combined	Parallel
2015	19	61	—	20	47	—	—	—N/a
2016	20	45	—	13	—	49	35	—N/a
2017	21	18	—	6	35	—	20	—N/a
2018	22	25	—	12	35	35	4	—N/a
2019	23	27	—	9	29	37	9	—N/a
2020	24	5	—	4	10	11	6	6
2021	25	6	43	1	6	29	—N/a	5
2022	26	10	—	5	10	35	—N/a	4
2023	27	8	—	3	8	32	—N/a	—N/a
2024	28	9	—	9	9	9	—N/a	—N/a
2025	29	27	—	26	16	21	—N/a	—N/a

Standings through 10 March 2025

=== Race podiums ===
- 7 wins – (6 GS, 1 DH)
- 30 podiums – (20 GS, 5 SG, 2 AC, 2 DH, 1 PGS); 95 top tens

Season
Season	Date	Location	Discipline	Place
2017	22 Oct 2016	Sölden, Austria	Giant slalom	3rd
2017	24 Jan 2017	Kronplatz, Italy	Giant slalom	3rd
2017	19 Mar 2017	(United States) Aspen, USA	Giant slalom	3rd
2018	26 Jan 2018	Lenzerheide, Switzerland	Combined	2nd
2019	15 Jan 2019	Kronplatz, Italy	Giant slalom	3rd
2020	30 Nov 2019	(United States) Killington, USA	Giant slalom	1st
2020	28 Dec 2019	Lienz, Austria	Giant slalom	2nd
2020	12 Jan 2020	Altenmarkt-Zauchensee, Austria	Combined	3rd
2020	19 Jan 2020	Sestriere, Italy	Parallel-G	3rd
2020	25 Jan 2020	Bansko, Bulgaria	Downhill	2nd
2020	26 Jan 2020	Bansko, Bulgaria	Super-G	2nd
2021	17 Oct 2020	Sölden, Austria	Giant slalom	1st
2021	12 Dec 2020	Courchevel, France	Giant slalom	1st
2021	10 Jan 2021	St. Anton, Austria	Super-G	2nd
2021	16 Jan 2021	Kranjska Gora, Slovenia	Giant slalom	1st
2021	17 Jan 2021	Kranjska Gora, Slovenia	Giant slalom	1st
2021	26 Jan 2021	Kronplatz, Italy	Giant slalom	3rd
2022	22 Dec 2021	Courchevel, France	Giant slalom	3rd
2022	8 Jan 2022	Kranjska Gora, Slovenia	Giant slalom	3rd
2022	11 Mar 2022	Åre, Sweden	Giant slalom	2nd
2022	20 Mar 2022	Méribel, France	Giant slalom	2nd
2023	26 Nov 2022	(United States) Killington, USA	Giant slalom	2nd
2023	10 Dec 2022	Sestriere, Italy	Giant slalom	1st
2023	27 Dec 2022	Semmering, Austria	Giant slalom	3rd
2023	28 Dec 2022	Semmering, Austria	Giant slalom	3rd
2023	7 Jan 2023	Kranjska Gora, Slovenia	Giant slalom	2nd
2023	15 Jan 2023	St. Anton, Austria	Super-G	3rd
2023	22 Jan 2023	Cortina d'Ampezzo, Italy	Super-G	3rd
2024	17 Feb 2024	Crans-Montana, Switzerland	Downhill	1st
2024	18 Feb 2024	Crans-Montana, Switzerland	Super-G	3rd

=== Podiums ===
Season	Podiums																		
Season	Downhill			Super G			Giant slalom			Combined			Parallel			Total			
Season	1st place, gold medalist(s)	2nd place, silver medalist(s)	3rd place, bronze medalist(s)	1st place, gold medalist(s)	2nd place, silver medalist(s)	3rd place, bronze medalist(s)	1st place, gold medalist(s)	2nd place, silver medalist(s)	3rd place, bronze medalist(s)	1st place, gold medalist(s)	2nd place, silver medalist(s)	3rd place, bronze medalist(s)	1st place, gold medalist(s)	2nd place, silver medalist(s)	3rd place, bronze medalist(s)	1st place, gold medalist(s)	2nd place, silver medalist(s)	3rd place, bronze medalist(s)	Σ
2017									3							0	0	3	3
2018											1					0	1	0	1
2019									1							0	0	1	1
2020		1			1		1	1				1			1	1	3	2	6
2021					1		4		1							4	1	1	6
2022								2	2							0	2	2	4
2023						2	1	2	2							1	2	4	7
2024	1					1										1	0	1	2
Total	1	1	0	0	2	3	6	5	9	0	1	1	0	0	1	7	9	14	30
Total	2			5			20			2			1			30			30

== World Championship results ==
Year
Year	Age	Slalom	Giant slalom	Super-G	Downhill	Combined	Team; Combined	Parallel	Team Event
2015	19	—	DNF2	—	—	—	—N/a	—N/a	—
2017	21	—	11	—	—	17	—N/a	—N/a	—
2019	23	—	13	—	—	13	—N/a	—N/a	3
2021	25	—	13	11	—	6	—N/a	1	—
2023	27	—	5	1	—	DNF SG	—N/a	11	—
2025	29	—	DNF1	16	—	—N/a	—	—N/a	—

== Olympic results ==
Year
Year	Age	Slalom	Giant slalom	Super-G	Downhill	Combined	Team Event
2018	22	DNF1	5	—	—	10	—
2022	26	—	DNF1	17	—	DNF SL	8

== National titles ==
Bassino has won four national championships at individual senior level.

- Italian Alpine Ski Championships
  - Giant slalom: 2014, 2019, 2021
  - Slalom: 2019

== See also ==
- Italian female skiers most successful World Cup race winner
