= Sofia Goggia =

Italian alpine skier (born 1992)

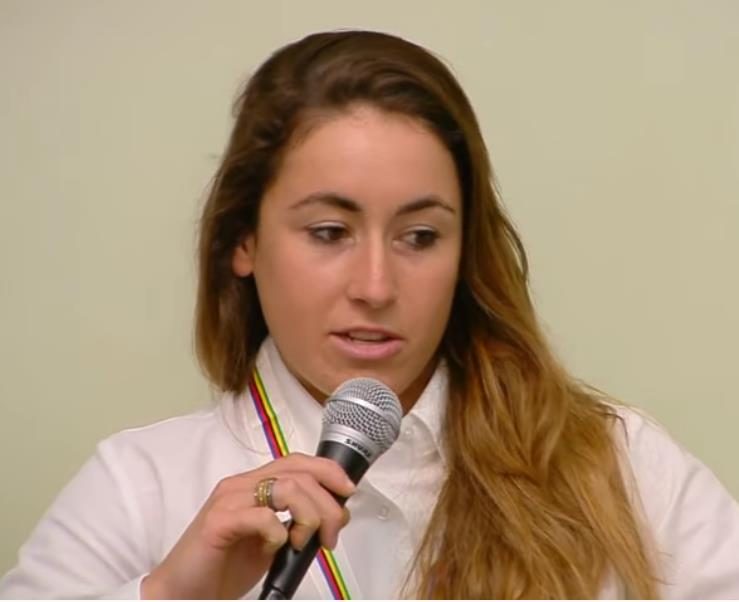
- Goggia in 2019 at Palazzo Chigi

Personal information
- Born: 15 November 1992 (age 33) Bergamo, Lombardy, Italy
- Height: 1.70 m (5 ft 7 in)

Skiing career
- Country: Italy
- Sport: Alpine skiing
- Club: G.S. Fiamme Gialle
- Disciplines: Downhill, super-G, giant slalom, combined
- World Cup debut: 28 December 2011 (age 19)

Olympics
- Teams: 3 – (2018, 2022, 2026)
- Medals: 3 (1 gold)

World Championships
- Teams: 5 – (2013, 2017, 2019, 2023, 2025)
- Medals: 2 (0 gold)

World Cup
- Seasons: 15 – (2012–2026)
- Wins: 29 – (19 DH, 10 SG)
- Podiums: 69 – (39 DH, 24 SG, 5 GS, 1 AC)
- Overall titles: 0 – (3rd in 2017 and 2025)
- Discipline titles: 5 – (DH – 2018, 2021, 2022, 2023; SG – 2026)
Medal record
Women's alpine skiing
Representing Italy
World Cup race podiums
Event	1st	2nd	3rd
Giant slalom	0	3	2
Super-G	10	8	6
Downhill	19	13	7
Combined	0	0	1
Total	29	24	16
International competitions
Event	1st	2nd	3rd
Olympic Games	1	1	1
World Championships	0	1	1
Total	1	2	2
Olympic Games
Gold medal – first place	2018 Pyeongchang	Downhill
Silver medal – second place	2022 Beijing	Downhill
Bronze medal – third place	2026 Milano Cortina	Downhill
World Championships
Silver medal – second place	2019 Åre	Super-G
Bronze medal – third place	2017 St. Moritz	Giant slalom

Sofia Goggia (Italian pronunciation: [soˈfiːa ˈɡɔddʒa]; born 15 November 1992) is an Italian World Cup alpine ski racer who competes in all disciplines and specialises in the speed events of downhill and super-G. She is a three-time Olympic downhill medalist – gold at the 2018 Winter Olympics, the first one for an Italian woman – and four-time World Cup downhill title winner (2018, 2021–2023).

== Career ==
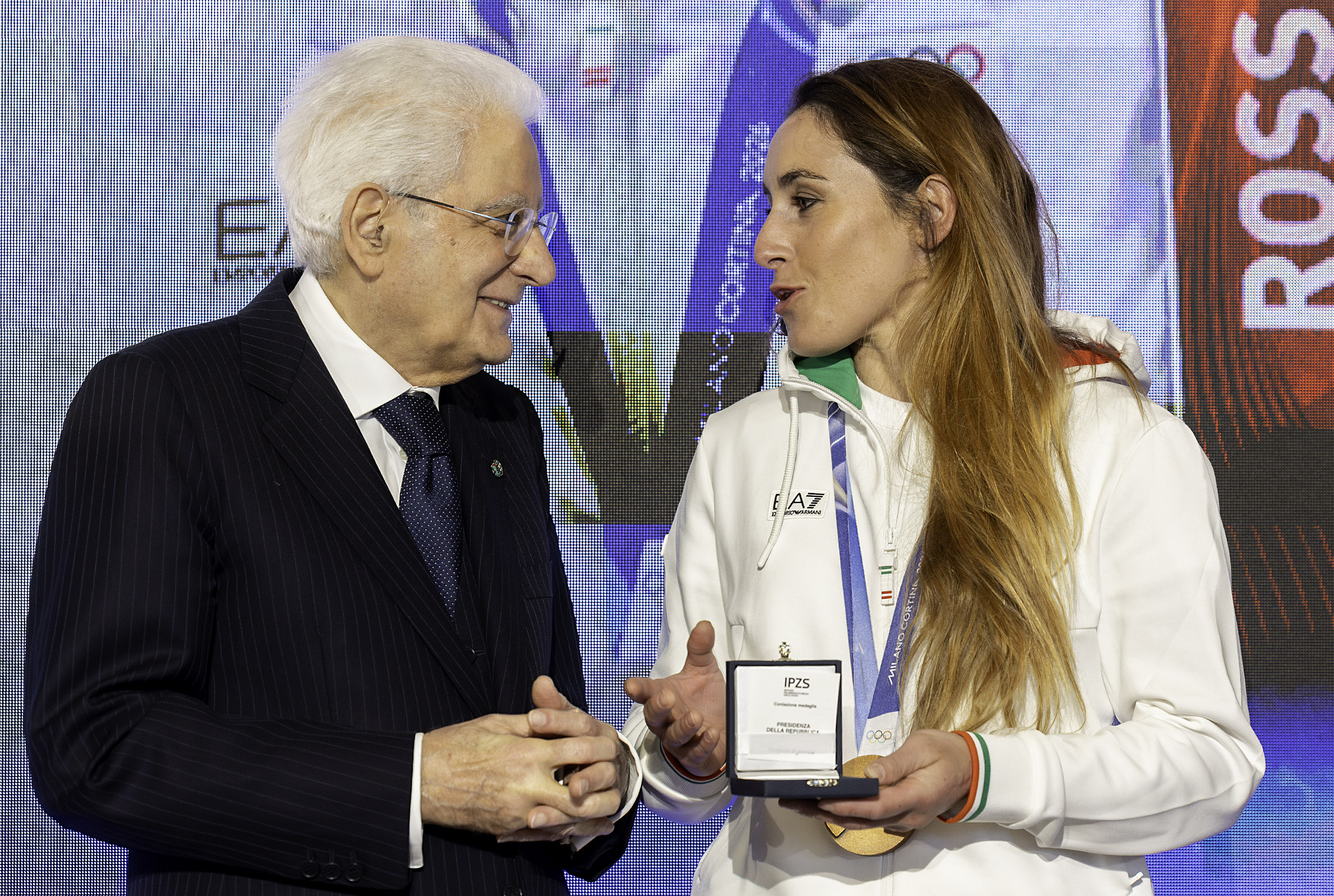
The Italian President Sergio Mattarella and the alpine skier Sofia Goggia in 2026 in Quirinale.

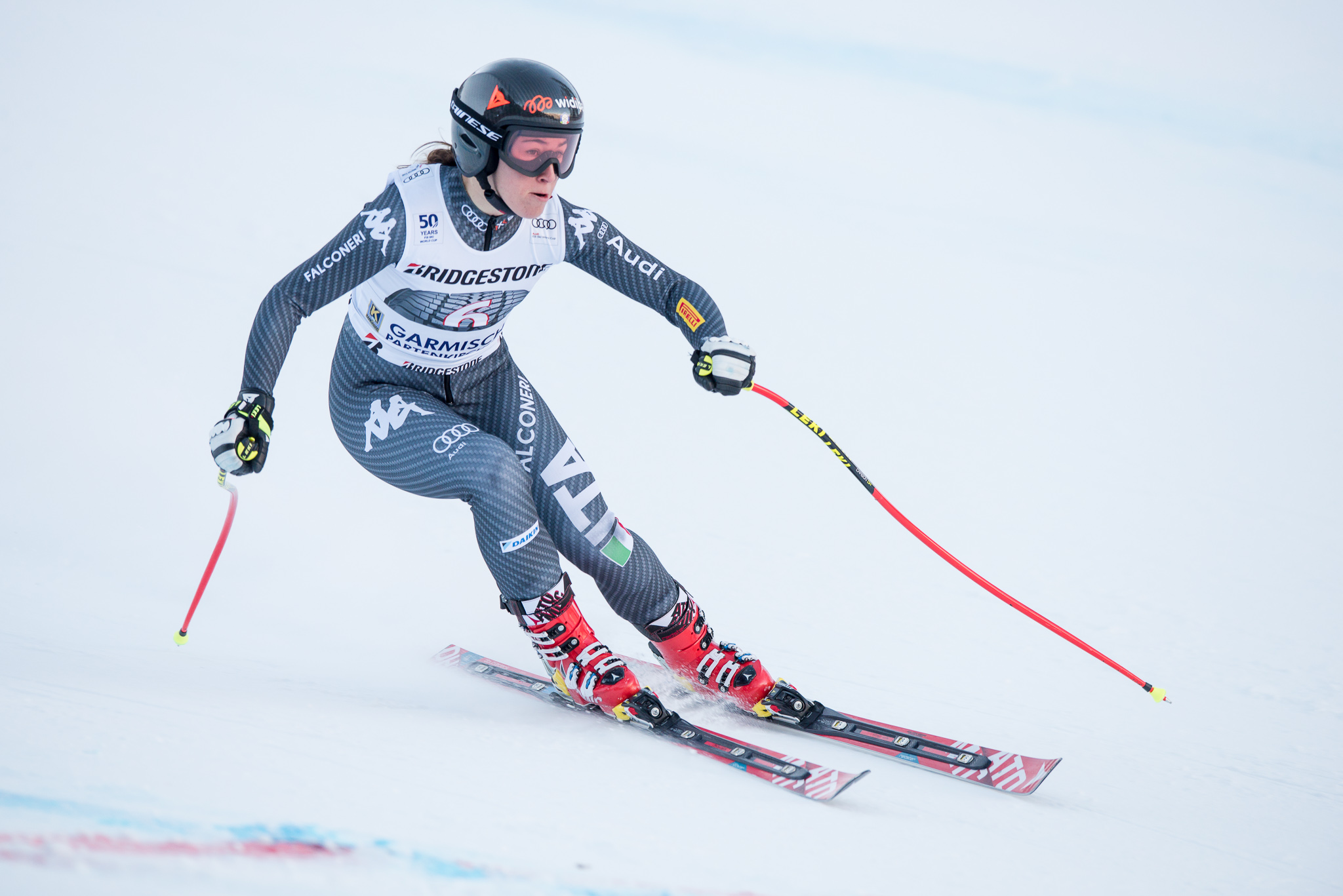
Goggia at Garmisch-Partenkirchen in 2017

With only four career starts in giant slalom (and no finishes) in her World Cup career, Goggia was named to the Italian women's team for the 2013 World Championships in Schladming, Austria. She capitalized on the opportunity and posted two top ten finishes: fourth in the super-G and seventh in the super combined. Goggia attained her first World Cup podium in November 2016, a third place in giant slalom at Killington. She won the bronze medal in the same event at the World Championships in February.

Goggia's first World Cup win came in downhill in March 2017 at Jeongseon, South Korea. She followed it up with a super-G win the following day for her eleventh World Cup podium of the season. It was the fourth time that she gained multiple podiums at the same race venue, and added a fifth with two podiums at the World Cup finals in Aspen. She finished the season with 1197 World Cup points, 13 podiums in four different disciplines and third place overall.

In 2018, she won consecutive World Cup downhills in mid-January at Bad Kleinkirchheim and Cortina d'Ampezzo. She was the gold medalist in the downhill at the 2018 Winter Olympics in PyeongChang, South Korea, and won the World Cup season title in downhill, edging out Lindsey Vonn by three points. The sporting achievements of the season earned her a nomination for the Laureus World Sports Award for Breakthrough of the Year.

A broken ankle in October 2018 caused Goggia to miss most of the World Cup season; she returned in late January 2019 with runner-up finishes in her first two starts at Garmisch-Partenkirchen, Germany. She won her first race of the season since her comeback from the injury in the ladies' downhill at Crans-Montana, Switzerland, in February.

At the World Championships in Åre, Goggia won the silver medal in the super-G, 0.02 seconds behind gold medalist Mikaela Shiffrin.

In June 2019, the Italian Olympic Committee named Goggia as ambassador for the nation’s bid to host the 2026 Winter Olympic Games in Milan-Cortina. On 24 June she was part of the Italian delegation at the IOC headquarters in Lausanne, where Milan-Cortina were elected as hosts, defeating Stockholm-Åre.

In the 2020 season, Goggia achieved two Super-G podiums - a victory in St. Moritz and a second place in Sochi – both together with teammate Federica Brignone. In early February she suffered a fall during the super-G race in Garmisch-Partenkirchen that caused a fracture in her left arm and the premature end of the season.

In December 2020, Goggia claimed her first World Cup downhill victory in almost two years on the Oreiller-Killy slope in Val d’Isère, France, a day after a runner-up finish on the same hill in the first downhill race of the season. She continued her podium-topping year in the discipline in January 2021, with a first place in St. Anton, Austria, and back-to-back victories on the Mont Lachaux course in Crans-Montana. By winning four consecutive downhill races, Goggia became the first woman to achieve this feat since Vonn in 2018. On 31 January, while skiing down to the valley after the cancelled super-G in Garmisch-Partenkirchen, Goggia fell on the wet snow, breaking a bone in her right knee. The injury forced her to miss the home World Championships in Cortina – started just a week after the fall – and two World Cup downhill races. She back training in early March, planning to defend her downhill standings lead in the last event of the season in Lenzerheide, Switzerland. On 17 March, Goggia became for the second time in career World Cup downhill champion, after heavy snowfall forced the cancellation of the race.

In early December 2021, Goggia won all three races in Lake Louise for her first career "hat-trick", joining Vonn (2011, 2012, 2015) and Katja Seizinger (1997) as the only women to win both downhills and super-G in the classic Canadian venue. In October 2021, Goggia was named as Italy's flag bearer for the opening ceremony of the 2022 Winter Olympics in Beijing, China. On 23 January 2022, Goggia suffered a knee injury after a crash in the Cortina d'Ampezzo Super-G. She immediately started physical rehab with the aim of returning in time to defend her Olympic downhill title in mid-February. Goggia traveled to Beijing aiming to take part in the downhill, but pulled out from her flag-bearing duties in the opening ceremony on 4 February. On 15 February, despite all setbacks, she won silver in downhill – her second consecutive Olympic medal in that event. After the Olympics, Goggia did not enjoy much success in the remaining World Cup events, but nonetheless won the downhill cup once again with her strong early season results (4 victories and a third place).

In the 2022–23 season, Goggia won five of the nine downhill races contested, also finishing three times on the podium in second place. At the World Cup finals in Soldeu, Andorra, she won her fourth crystal globe in the discipline, the third consecutive. At the 2023 World Championships in Méribel, France, Goggia was a strong favourite for the downhill race, however, she was disqualified for straddling a gate.

On 6 February 2026, during the opening ceremony of the 2026 Winter Olympics, Goggia served as the final torchbearer, lighting the Olympic cauldron at Cortina d’Ampezzo, while Italian former Olympic champions Alberto Tomba and Deborah Compagnoni simultaneously lit the cauldron in Milan. Two days later, she won the bronze medal in the women’s downhill on the Olimpia delle Tofane, becoming the first athlete ever to win three consecutive Olympic medals in alpine skiing downhill. In the 2025–26 season Goggia won the Super-G crystal globe at the World Cup Finals in Lillehammer, Norway, securing her first in the discipline and adding to her four previous downhill titles.

== Injuries ==
The career of the Bergamo athlete has been studded with numerous injuries.

1. 2010: as a teenager, she tore the anterior cruciate ligament (ACL) of both knees in two different crashes.
2. February 2012: she stretched both collateral ligaments in her left knee and fractured the tibial plateau during a Europa Cup race.
3. December 2013: Goggia tore anterior cruciate ligament in her left knee in a downhill crash at Lake Louise, Canada. She returned the following season but cut her campaign short again with knee problems in January 2015.
4. October 2018: she fractured the fibular malleolus of her right leg during a training session in Hintertux, Austria.
5. February 2020: a compound radius fracture of the left arm on the Garmisch-Partenkirchen track puts an end to her competitive season.
6. January 2021: compound fracture of the lateral tibial plateau of the right knee coming down from a track to return to the hotel, again in Garmisch-Partenkirchen.
7. January 2022: a crash in the super-G of Cortina d'Ampezzo resulted in a sprained left knee, with a partial cruciate ligament injury already operated in 2013, a small fracture of the fibula and a muscular tendon injury.
8. December 2022: During the first downhill of St. Moritz on 16 December 2022 she broke her hand impacting the ground in a push-up shortly after the start of the race, despite this she finished the race 2nd. She runs to Milan to have surgery and the day after she wins the second downhill.
9. February 2024: Goggia fractured the tibia and tibial malleolus of the right leg falling during a giant slalom training session in Ponte di Legno, Italy.

All these injuries did not prevent her from winning 29 World Cup races, finishing third overall in the World Cup standings in 2017 and 2025, claiming four World Cup downhill season titles and one in Super-G, earning two medals at the World Championships, winning Olympic downhill gold at PyeongChang 2018, and adding two more Olympic downhill medals — silver at Beijing 2022 and bronze at Milano Cortina 2026.

== World Cup results ==
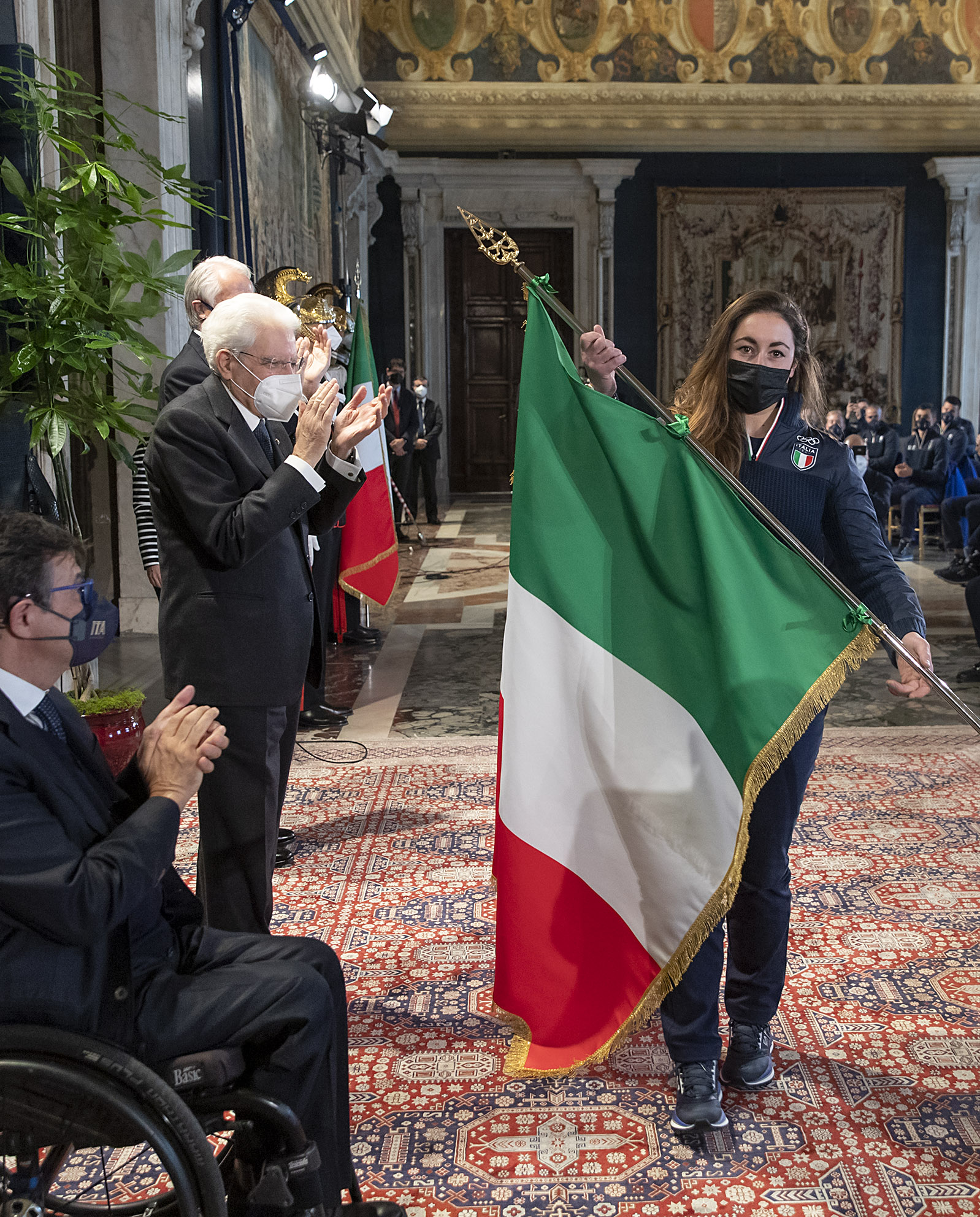
Sofia Goggia receives, on 23 December 2021, from the President of the Italian Republic, Sergio Mattarella the Italian flag that the Italian athlete should have carried, as flagbarear at the 2022 Winter Olympics opening ceremony in Beijing, but she was forced to give up due to an injury and was replaced by her fellow citizen from Bergamo, Michela Moioli.

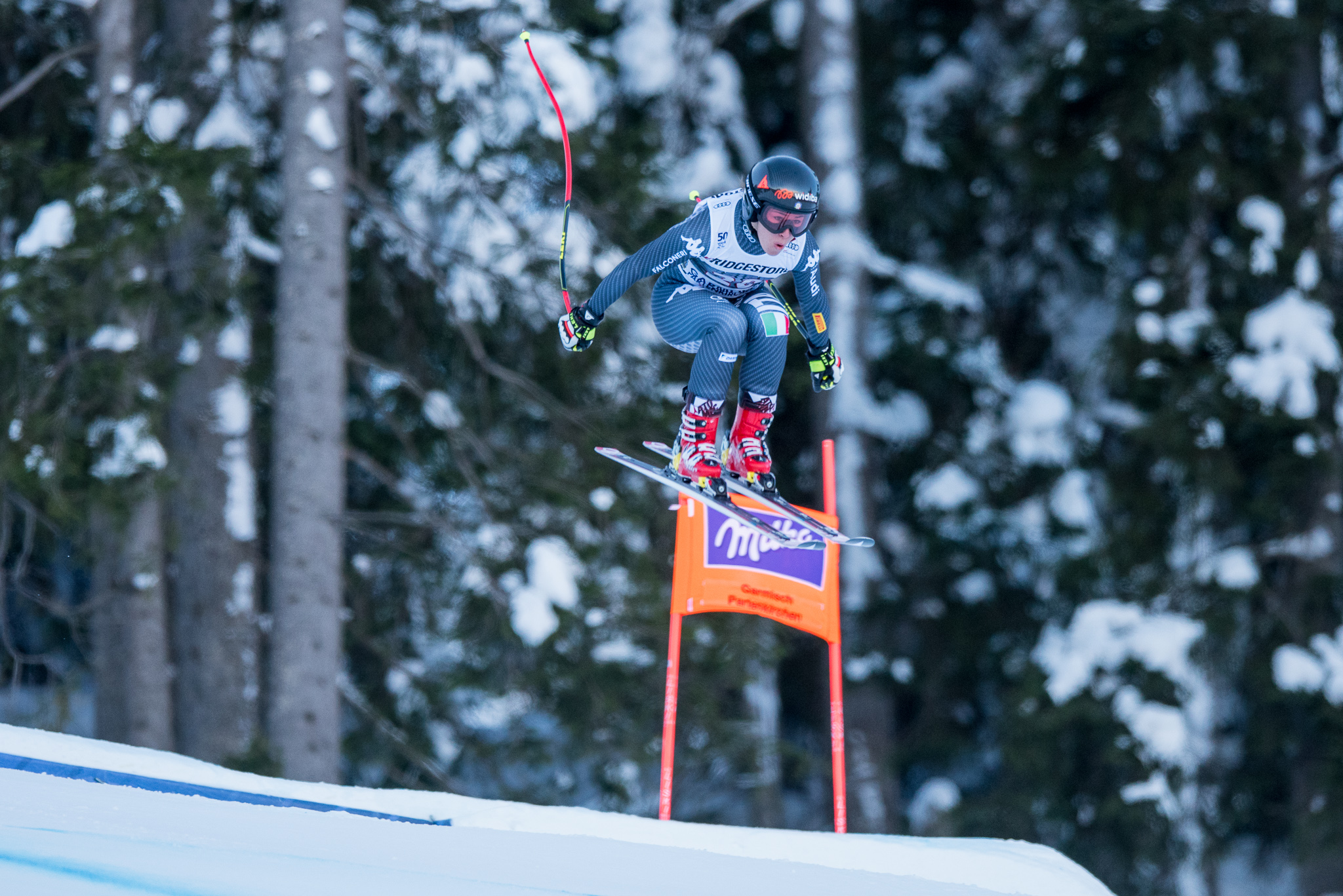
Goggia in a spectacular jump at Garmisch-Partenkirchen in 2018

=== Season titles ===
- 5 titles – (4 DH, 1 SG)

Season	Discipline
2018	Downhill
2021	Downhill
2022	Downhill
2023	Downhill
2026	Super-G

=== Season standings ===
Season
Season	Age	Overall	Slalom	Giant slalom	Super-G	Downhill	Combined
2014	21	85	—	—	30	—	—
2015	22	123	—	—	58	—	—
2016	23	38	—	22	20	32	35
2017	24	3rd place, bronze medalist(s)	—	3rd place, bronze medalist(s)	6	2nd place, silver medalist(s)	8
2018	25	4	—	22	5	1st place, gold medalist(s)	17
2019 (Note: Sidelined by ankle injury until late January 2019)	26	22	—	43	14	7	—
2020	27	11	—	19	8	17	—
2021 (Note: Injured in late January 2021, out for the rest of the season)	28	9	—	13	18	1st place, gold medalist(s)	—N/a
2022	29	6	—	35	5	1st place, gold medalist(s)	—N/a
2023	30	5	—	—	11	1st place, gold medalist(s)	—N/a
2024 (Note: Injured in early February 2024, out for the rest of the season)	31	7	—	14	10	3rd place, bronze medalist(s)	—N/a
2025	32	3rd place, bronze medalist(s)	—	17	3rd place, bronze medalist(s)	3rd place, bronze medalist(s)	—N/a
2026	33	4	—	19	1st place, gold medalist(s)	7	—N/a

=== Race victories ===
	Total	Slalom	Giant slalom	Super-G	Downhill	Combined	Parallel
Wins	29	—	—	10	19	—	—
Podiums	69	—	5	24	39	1	—

#	Season			
#	Season	Date	Location	Discipline
1	2017	4 March 2017	Jeongseon, South Korea	Downhill
2	2017	5 March 2017	Jeongseon, South Korea	Super-G
3	2018	14 January 2018	Bad Kleinkirchheim, Austria	Downhill
4	2018	19 January 2018	Cortina d'Ampezzo, Italy	Downhill
5	2018	15 March 2018	Åre, Sweden	Super-G
6	2019	23 February 2019	Crans-Montana, Switzerland	Downhill
7	2020	14 December 2019	St. Moritz, Switzerland	Super-G
8	2021	19 December 2020	Val d'Isère, France	Downhill
9	2021	9 January 2021	St. Anton, Austria	Downhill
10	2021	22 January 2021	Crans-Montana, Switzerland	Downhill
11	2021	23 January 2021	Crans-Montana, Switzerland	Downhill
12	2022	3 December 2021	Lake Louise, Canada	Downhill
13	2022	4 December 2021	Lake Louise, Canada	Downhill
14	2022	5 December 2021	Lake Louise, Canada	Super-G
15	2022	18 December 2021	Val d'Isère, France	Downhill
16	2022	19 December 2021	Val d'Isère, France	Super-G
17	2022	22 January 2022	Cortina d'Ampezzo, Italy	Downhill
18	2023	2 December 2022	Lake Louise, Canada	Downhill
19	2023	3 December 2022	Lake Louise, Canada	Downhill
20	2023	17 December 2022	St. Moritz, Switzerland	Downhill
21	2023	20 January 2023	Cortina d'Ampezzo, Italy	Downhill
22	2023	26 February 2023	Crans-Montana, Switzerland	Downhill
23	2024	8 December 2023	St. Moritz, Switzerland	Super-G
24	2024	13 January 2024	Altenmarkt-Zauchensee, Austria	Downhill
25	2025	15 December 2024	Beaver Creek, United States	Super-G
26	2025	18 January 2025	Cortina d'Ampezzo, Italy	Downhill
27	2026	21 December 2025	Val d'Isère, France	Super-G
28	2026	1 March 2026	Soldeu, Andorra	Super-G
29	2026	22 March 2026	Kvitfjell, Norway	Super-G

== World Championship results ==
Year
Year	Age	Slalom	Giant slalom	Super-G	Downhill	Combined
2013	20	—	—	4	22	7
2015	22	injured, did not compete				
2017	24	—	3	10	4	DNF2
2019	26	—	DNF2	2	15	—
2021	28	injured, did not compete				
2023	30	—	—	11	DSQ	DNS2
2025	32	—	DNF1	5	16	—N/a

== Olympic results ==
Year
Year	Age	Slalom	Giant slalom	Super-G	Downhill	Combined	Team combined
2018	25	—	11	11	1	DNS	—N/a
2022	29	—	—	—	2	—	—N/a
2026	33	—	10	DNF	3	—N/a	DNF1

== See also ==
- Italian skiers who closed in top 10 in overall World Cup
- List of FIS Alpine Ski World Cup women's race winners

Olympic Games
Preceded by Teddy Riner and Marie-José Pérec	Final Olympic torchbearer Milano Cortina 2026 alongside Deborah Compagnoni and Alberto Tomba	Succeeded by TBD 2028
Preceded by Dinigeer Yilamujiang and Zhao Jiawen	Final Winter Olympic torchbearer Milano Cortina 2026 alongside Deborah Compagnoni and Alberto Tomba	Succeeded by TBD 2030

Awards
Preceded by Tania Cagnotto	Italian Sportswoman of the Year; 2017, 2018	Succeeded by Federica Pellegrini
