= Tessa Worley =

French alpine skier

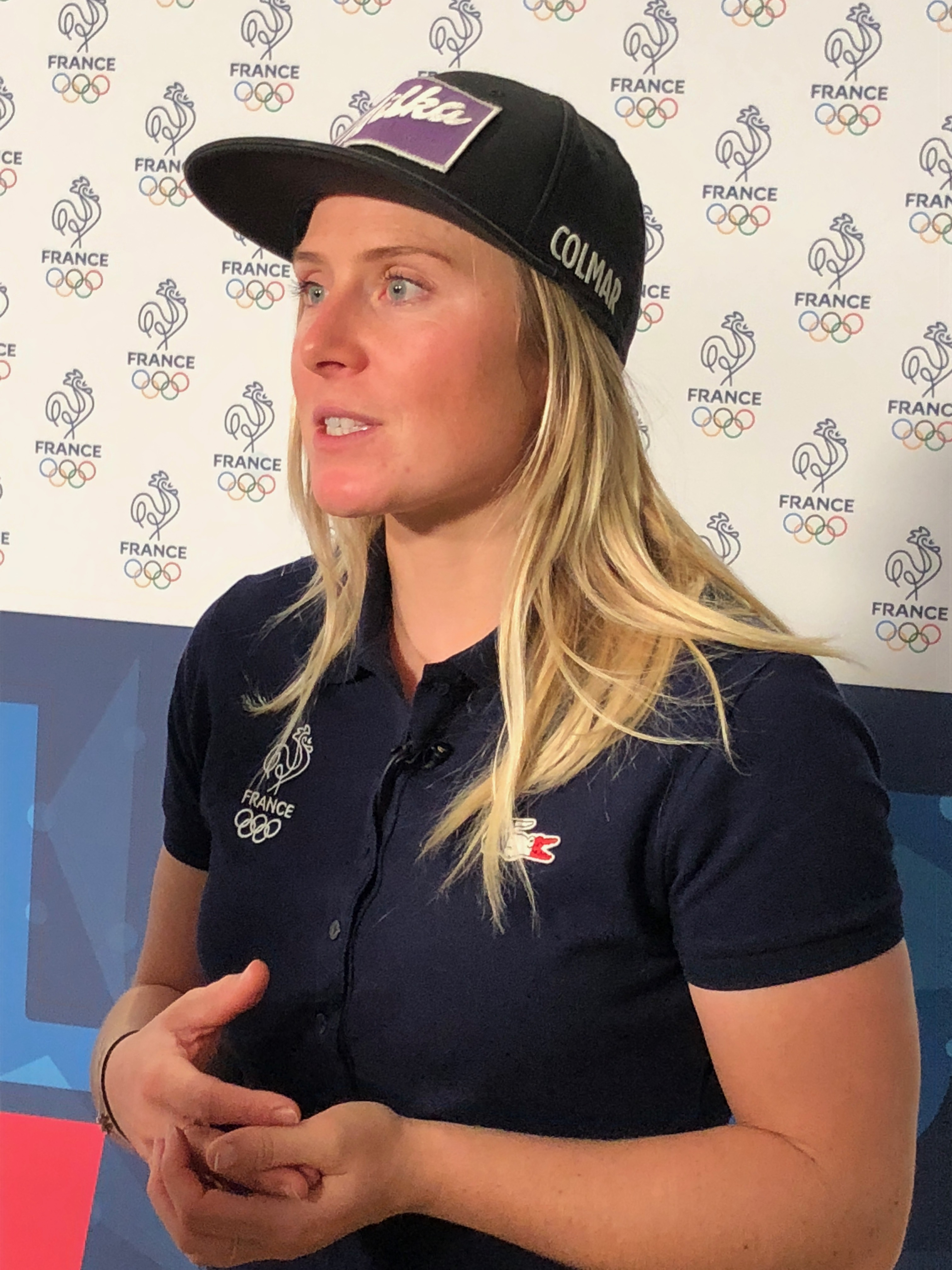
- Worley in 2017

Personal information
- Born: 4 October 1989 (age 36) Annemasse, Haute-Savoie, France
- Height: 1.58 m (5 ft 2 in)
- Website: tessaworley.net

Skiing career
- Sport: Alpine skiing
- Club: EMHM – Grand Bornand
- Disciplines: Giant slalom, super-G, combined
- World Cup debut: 4 February 2006 (age 16)

Olympics
- Teams: 3 – (2010, 2018, 2022)
- Medals: 0

World Championships
- Teams: 8 – (2009–2023)
- Medals: 6 (4 gold)

World Cup
- Seasons: 18 – (2006–2023)
- Wins: 16 – (16 GS)
- Podiums: 36 – (36 GS)
- Overall titles: 0 – (6th in 2017)
- Discipline titles: 2 – (2 GS; 2017, 2022)
Medal record
Women's alpine skiing
Representing France
World Cup race podiums
Event	1st	2nd	3rd
Giant slalom	16	10	10
International alpine competitions
Event	1st	2nd	3rd
Olympic Games	0	0	0
World Championships	4	0	2
Total	4	0	2
World Championships
Gold medal – first place	2011 Garmisch-Partenkirchen	Team event
Gold medal – first place	2013 Schladming	Giant slalom
Gold medal – first place	2017 St. Moritz	Giant slalom
Gold medal – first place	2017 St. Moritz	Team event
Bronze medal – third place	2011 Garmisch-Partenkirchen	Giant slalom
Bronze medal – third place	2021 Cortina d'Ampezzo	Parallel
Junior World Championships
Bronze medal – third place	2008 Formigal	Giant slalom

Tessa Worley (born 4 October 1989) is a French former World Cup alpine ski racer and non-commissioned officer. She previously competed in all five alpine disciplines and specialised in giant slalom.

== Career ==
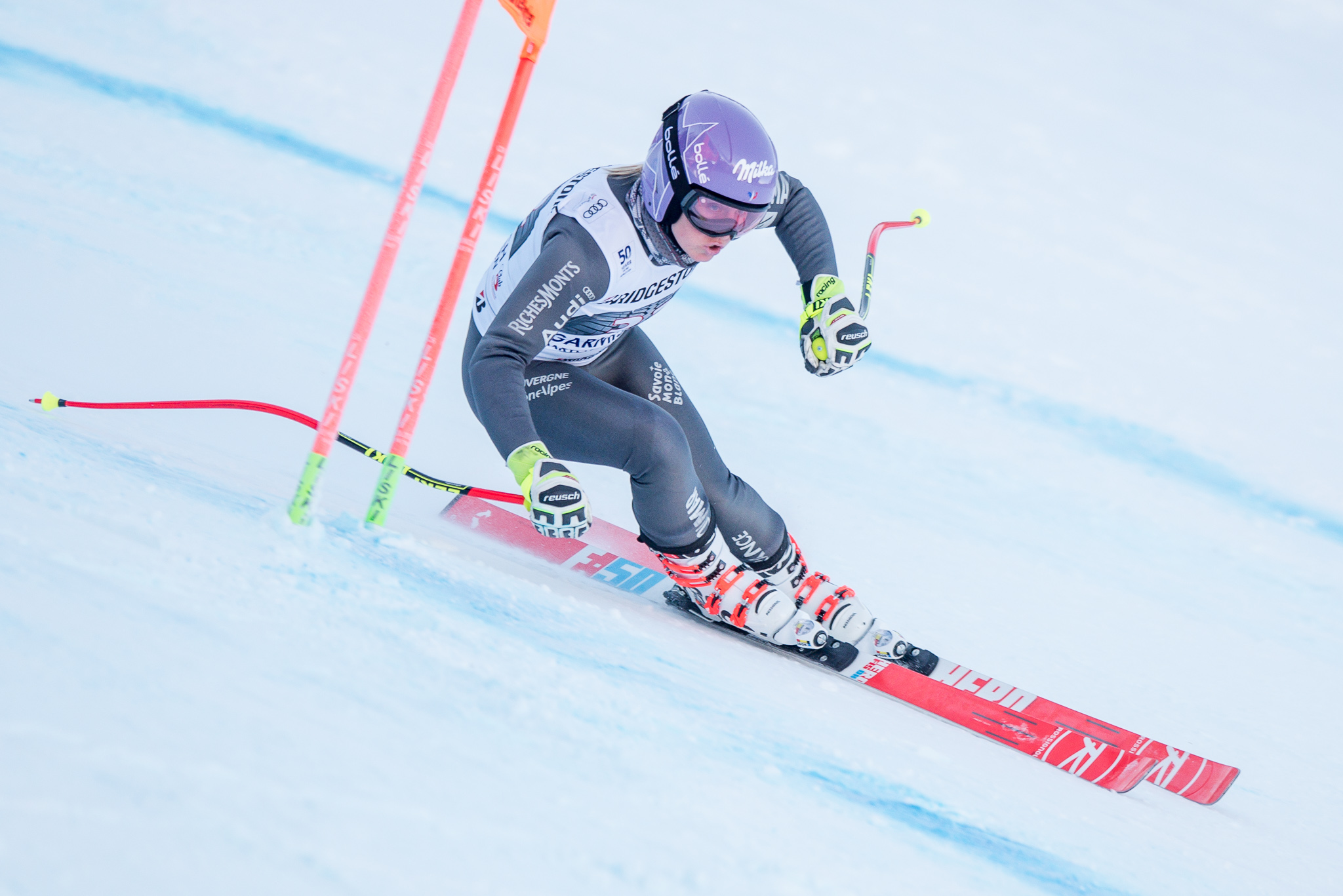
Worley in action in 2017 in Garmisch-Partenkirchen.

Born in Annemasse, in the département of Haute-Savoie, Worley's father Steve is Australian and her mother Madeleine is French, as such she possesses both French and Australian citizenships. She grew up skiing year-round, in France and New Zealand, and her home ski area is the resort of Le Grand-Bornand.

Worley made her World Cup debut at age 16 in February 2006, and finished in 29th place in a giant slalom in Ofterschwang, Germany. She was fifth in the first race of the 2009 season, a giant slalom in Sölden, Austria, in October 2008. A month later, she gained her first World Cup victory (and first podium) in giant slalom at Aspen, United States.

Early in the 2011 season, Worley won three consecutive giant slalom races before January. In February, she won a gold medal in the team event at the World Championships in Garmisch-Partenkirchen, Germany, and was also the bronze medalist in the giant slalom. At the next edition in 2013 at Schladming, Worley won both runs of the giant slalom to claim the world title.

Two days after her eighth World Cup win, Worley was injured in a slalom in France in December 2013. Caught on the tails of her skis in the first run at Courchevel, she tore the anterior cruciate ligament in her right knee and also had some lateral meniscus damage. It ended Worley's 2014 World Cup season and kept her out of the 2014 Olympics.

== World Cup results ==
=== Season titles ===
- 2 titles – (2 giant slalom)

Season
Season	Discipline
2017	Giant slalom
2022	Giant slalom

=== Season standings ===
Season
Season	Age	Overall	Slalom	Giant slalom	Super-G	Downhill	Combined
2006	16	118	—	57	—	—	—
2007	17						
2008	18	42	—	14	—	—	—
2009	19	39	—	11	—	—	—
2010	20	37	37	13	—	—	—
2011	21	16	34	2	43	—	27
2012	22	11	27	3	37	39	23
2013	23	11	38	4	22	—	25
2014	24	40	—	16	22	—	—
2015	25	46	—	13	34	—	—
2016	26	27	—	11	21	35	11
2017	27	6	—	1	9	—	32
2018	28	13	—	2	18	50	—
2019	29	14	—	3	—	—	—
2020	30	29	—	8	30	—	—
2021	31	12	—	3	17	—	—N/a
2022	32	8	—	1	13	—	—N/a
2023	33	16	—	8	12	—	—N/a

=== Race podiums ===
- 16 wins – (16 GS)
- 36 podiums – (36 GS)

Season
Season	Date	Location	Discipline	Place
2009	20 Nov 2008	(United States) Aspen, USA	Giant slalom	1st
2010	12 Dec 2009	Åre, Sweden	Giant slalom	1st
2011	27 Nov 2010	(United States) Aspen, USA	Giant slalom	1st
2011	12 Dec 2010	St. Moritz, Switzerland	Giant slalom	1st
2011	28 Dec 2010	Semmering, Austria	Giant slalom	1st
2012	28 Dec 2011	Lienz, Austria	Giant slalom	3rd
2012	21 Jan 2012	Kranjska Gora, Slovenia	Giant slalom	1st
2012	12 Feb 2012	Soldeu, Andorra	Giant slalom	1st
2013	9 Dec 2012	St. Moritz, Switzerland	Giant slalom	3rd
2013	16 Dec 2012	Courchevel, France	Giant slalom	3rd
2013	28 Dec 2012	Semmering, Austria	Giant slalom	3rd
2013	17 Mar 2013	Lenzerheide, Switzerland	Giant slalom	2nd
2014	15 Dec 2013	St. Moritz, Switzerland	Giant slalom	1st
2017	26 Nov 2016	(United States) Killington, USA	Giant slalom	1st
2017	10 Dec 2016	Sestriere, Italy	Giant slalom	1st
2017	27 Dec 2016	Semmering, Austria	Giant slalom	2nd
2017	28 Dec 2016	Semmering, Austria	Giant slalom	2nd
2017	7 Jan 2017	Maribor, Slovenia	Giant slalom	1st
2017	24 Jan 2017	Kronplatz, Italy	Giant slalom	2nd
2017	10 Mar 2017	(United States) Squaw Valley, USA	Giant slalom	3rd
2018	28 Oct 2017	Sölden, Austria	Giant slalom	2nd
2018	19 Dec 2017	Courchevel, France	Giant slalom	2nd
2018	6 Jan 2018	Kranjska Gora, Slovenia	Giant slalom	2nd
2018	27 Jan 2018	Lenzerheide, Switzerland	Giant slalom	1st
2019	27 Oct 2018	Sölden, Austria	Giant slalom	1st
2019	21 Dec 2018	Courchevel, France	Giant slalom	3rd
2019	28 Dec 2018	Semmering, Austria	Giant slalom	3rd
2019	15 Jan 2019	Kronplatz, Italy	Giant slalom	2nd
2020	26 Oct 2019	Sölden, Austria	Giant slalom	3rd
2021	14 Dec 2020	Courchevel, France	Giant slalom	3rd
2021	16 Jan 2021	Kranjska Gora, Slovenia	Giant slalom	2nd
2021	26 Jan 2021	Kronplatz, Italy	Giant slalom	1st
2022	28 Dec 2021	Lienz, Austria	Giant slalom	1st
2022	8 Jan 2022	Kranjska Gora, Slovenia	Giant slalom	2nd
2022	25 Jan 2022	Kronplatz, Italy	Giant slalom	3rd
2022	6 Mar 2022	Lenzerheide, Switzerland	Giant slalom	1st

== World Championship results ==
Year
Year	Age	Slalom	Giant slalom	Super-G	Downhill	Combined	Parallel	Team event
2009	19	—	7	—	—	—	—N/a	—
2011	21	13	3	—	—	—	—N/a	1
2013	23	—	1	27	—	—	—N/a	QF
2015	25	—	13	24	—	—	—N/a	QF
2017	27	—	1	8	—	—	—N/a	1
2019	29	—	6	16	—	—	—N/a	QF
2021	31	—	7	13	—	—	3	—
2023	33	—	DNF2	9	—	DNS SL	—	—

== Olympic results ==
Year
Year	Age	Slalom	Giant slalom	Super-G	Downhill	Combined
2010	20	—	16	—	—	—
2014	24	Injured, did not compete				
2018	28	—	7	28	—	—
2022	32	—	DNF2	19	—	—

Awards and achievements
Preceded by Émilie Andéol	French Sportswoman of the Year; 2017	Succeeded by Clarisse Agbegnenou
Olympic Games
Preceded by Martin Fourcade	Flagbearer for France (with Kevin Rolland); Beijing 2022	Succeeded by Incumbent
