= Cornelia Hütter =

Austrian alpine skier (born 1992)

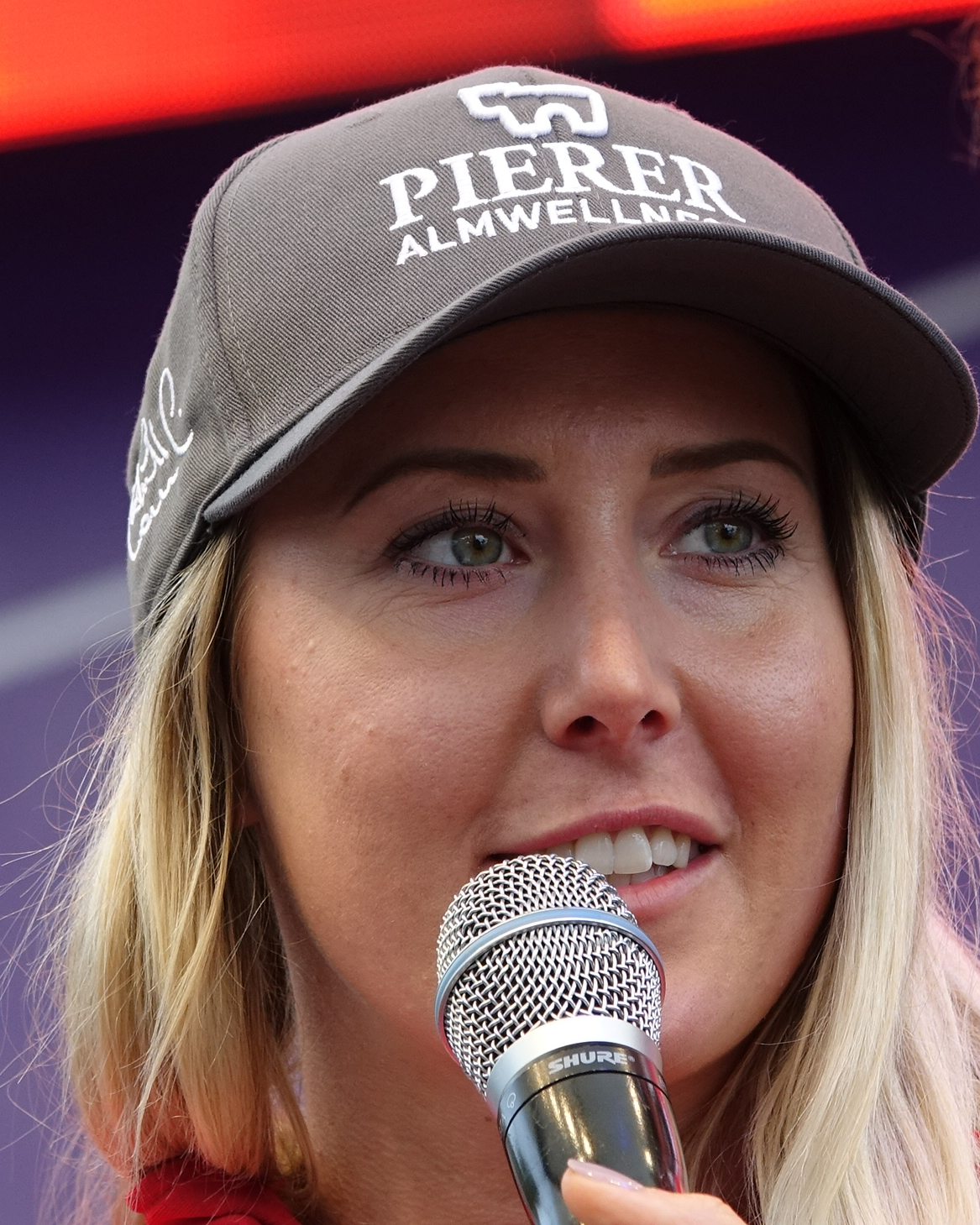
- Hütter in 2023

Personal information
- Born: 29 October 1992 (age 33) Graz, Styria, Austria
- Height: 1.71 m (5 ft 7 in)

Skiing career
- Country: Austria
- Sport: Alpine skiing
- Club: SV St. Radegund
- Disciplines: Downhill, super-G, combined
- World Cup debut: 2 December 2011 (age 19)

Olympics
- Teams: 4 – (2014–2026)
- Medals: 1 (0 gold)

World Championships
- Teams: 3 – (2015, 2023, 2025)
- Medals: 1 (0 gold)

World Cup
- Seasons: 14 – (2012–2019, 2021–2026)
- Wins: 10 – (5 DH, 5 SG)
- Podiums: 34 – (20 DH, 14 SG)
- Overall titles: 0 – (5th in 2024)
- Discipline titles: 1 – (1 DH: 2024)
Medal record
Women's alpine skiing
Representing Austria
World Cup race podiums
Event	1st	2nd	3rd
Downhill	5	6	9
Super-G	5	5	4
Total	10	11	13
Olympic Games
Bronze medal – third place	2026 Milano Cortina	Super-G
World Championships
Bronze medal – third place	2023 Méribel	Super-G
Junior World Ski Championships
Bronze medal – third place	2011 Crans-Montana	Downhill
Bronze medal – third place	2011 Crans-Montana	Super G

Cornelia "Conny" Hütter (born 29 October 1992) is a World Cup alpine ski racer from Austria.

Born in Graz, Styria, Hütter made her World Cup debut in November 2011 in Lake Louise, Canada. She attained her first World Cup podium in December 2013, a third place in downhill at Val-d'Isère, France.

A knee injury caused Hütter to miss most of the 2020 and 2021 seasons. During the 2022 season, she returned to the World Cup circuit with a victory and two additional podiums, and represented Austria in the Winter Olympics for a third time in 2022.

In the 2023 World Championships in Courchevel-Méribel, Hütter won her first World Championships medal, a bronze in the super-G. She shared the bronze placement with Norway's Kajsa Vickhoff Lie, the two having skied the same time of 1:28,39.

Hütter won the 2024 downhill season title with a victory at the World Cup finals in Saalbach, Austria, passing Switzerland's Lara Gut-Behrami, who had been in first place in the standings going into the event.

She earned her fourth trip to the Winter Olympics at the 2026 Milano Cortina games where she won her first Olympic medal, a bronze in the super-G.

== World Cup results ==
=== Season titles ===
- 1 title – (1 downhill)

Season	Discipline
2024	Downhill

=== Season standings ===
Season
Season	Age	Overall	Slalom	Giant slalom	Super G	Downhill	Combined
2013	20	84	—	—	42	34	—
2014	21	32	—	—	18	18	—
2015	22	14	—	—	4	18	19
2016	23	7	—	—	4	5	29
2017	24	58	—	—	37	23	39
2018	25	18	—	—	12	4	—
2019	26	35	—	—	25	13	—
2020	27	injured: did not compete					
2021	28	112	—	—	46	—	—N/a
2022	29	21	—	—	14	12	—N/a
2023	30	14	—	—	5	16	—N/a
2024	31	5	—	—	3rd place, bronze medalist(s)	1st place, gold medalist(s)	—N/a
2025	32	9	—	—	7	2nd place, silver medalist(s)	—N/a
2026	33	11	—	—	9	6	—N/a

=== Race victories ===
- 10 wins – (5 DH, 5 SG)
- 34 podiums – (20 DH, 14 SG)

Season
Season	Date	Location	Discipline
2016	12 March 2016	Lenzerheide, Switzerland	Super-G
2018	1 December 2017	Lake Louise, Canada	Downhill
2022	30 January 2022	Garmisch-Partenkirchen, Germany	Super-G
2023	3 March 2023	Kvitfjell, Norway	Super-G
2024	12 January 2024	Zauchensee, Austria	Super-G
2024	23 March 2024	Saalbach, Austria	Downhill
2025	14 December 2024	Beaver Creek, United States	Downhill
2025	21 December 2024	St. Moritz, Switzerland	Super-G
2025	28 February 2025	Kvitfjell, Norway	Downhill
2026	20 December 2025	Val d'Isère, France	Downhill

== World Championship results ==
Year
Year	Age	Slalom	Giant slalom	Super-G	Downhill	Combined	Team combined
2015	22	—	—	4	15	—	—N/a
2017	24	injured: did not compete					—N/a
2019	26	injured: did not compete					—N/a
2021	28	injured: did not compete					—N/a
2023	30	—	—	3	4	—	—N/a
2025	32	—	—	10	4	—N/a	6

== Olympic results ==
Year
Year	Age	Slalom	Giant slalom	Super-G	Downhill	Combined	Team combined
2014	21	—	—	—	24	—	—N/a
2018	25	—	—	8	13	—	—N/a
2022	29	—	—	8	7	—	—N/a
2026	33	—	—	3	4	—N/a	5
