= Erta =

Ski slope in Kronplatz, Italy

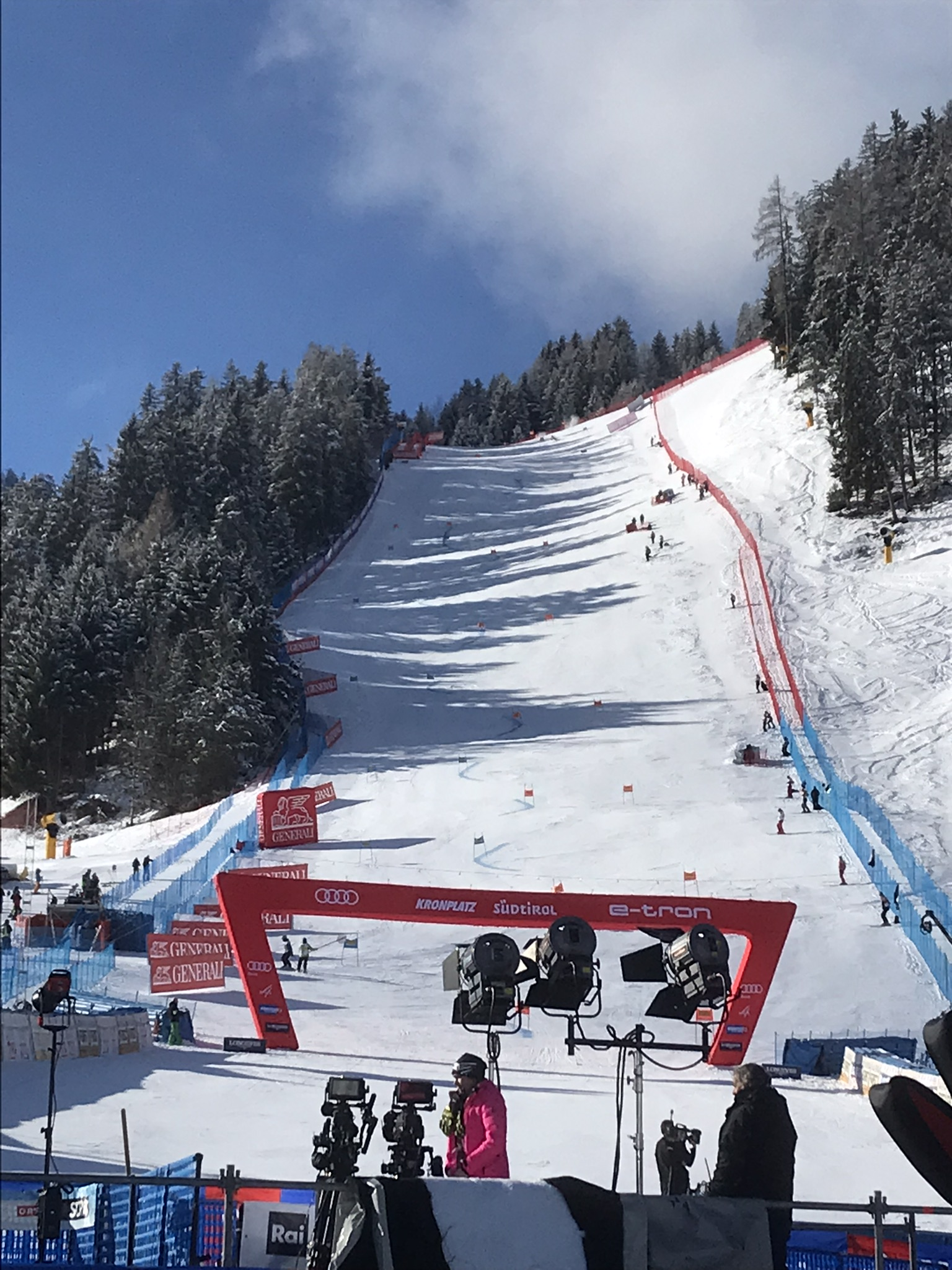
- Interactive map of Erta
- Location within Northern Italy
- 46°41′58″N 11°55′22″E
- Location: Kronplatz (Plan de Corones) Italy
- Mountain: Piz de Plaies

Giant slalom
- Start: 1,606 m (5,269 ft) (AA)
- Finish: 1,206 m (3,957 ft)
- Vertical drop: 400 m (1,312 ft)
- Length: 1,325 m (4,347 ft)
- Max incline: 31.4 degrees (61%)
- Avg incline: 17.7 degrees (32%)
- Min incline: 12.4 degrees (22%)
- Most Wins (W): Mikaela Shiffrin (3)

Erta is a women's World Cup giant slalom ski course on Piz de Plaies mountain in Kronplatz (Plan de Corones), Italy.

It is also used for men's Europa Cup slalom contests. With an average incline of 32%, this course is considered one of the most demanding giant slalom courses on the women's World Cup circuit, alongside Podkoren 3 in Kranjska Gora and Rettenbach in Sölden.

Mikaela Shiffrin holds the record for the most women's World Cup giant slalom victories on the course, with three wins in 2019 and 2023.

== Course ==
=== Sections ===
- Para Paulina
- Soleseid
- Spona
- Sorega

== World Cup ==
Since 2017, Erta is on calendar of the highest level as a regular host of the World Cup in women's giant slalom, traditionally held in end of January. Italian skier Federica Brignone was the first winner.

As of November 2026 the course has hosted 10 World Cup events for women (51st of all-time).

=== Women ===
No.	Type	Season	Date	Winner	Second	Third
1549	GS	2016/17	24 January 2017	(Italy) Federica Brignone	(France) Tessa Worley	(Italy) Marta Bassino
1588	GS	2017/18	23 January 2018	(Germany) Viktoria Rebensburg	(Norway) Ragnhild Mowinckel	(Italy) Federica Brignone
1620	GS	2018/19	15 January 2019	(United States) Mikaela Shiffrin	(France) Tessa Worley	(Italy) Marta Bassino
1686	GS	2020/21	26 January 2021	(France) Tessa Worley	(Switzerland) Lara Gut-Behrami	(Italy) Marta Bassino
1722	GS	2021/22	25 January 2022	(Sweden) Sara Hector	(Slovakia) Petra Vlhová	(France) Tessa Worley
1759	GS	2022/23	24 January 2023	(United States) Mikaela Shiffrin	(Switzerland) Lara Gut-Behrami	(Italy) Federica Brignone
1760	GS	2022/23	25 January 2023	(United States) Mikaela Shiffrin	(Norway) Ragnhild Mowinckel	(Sweden) Sara Hector
1798	GS	2023/24	30 January 2024	(Switzerland) Lara Gut-Behrami	(Sweden) Sara Hector (New Zealand) Alice Robinson	
1829	GS	2024/25	21 January 2025	(New Zealand) Alice Robinson	(Switzerland) Lara Gut-Behrami	(United States) Paula Moltzan
1867	GS	2025/26	20 January 2026	(Austria) Julia Scheib	(Switzerland) Camille Rast	(Sweden) Sara Hector
