= FIS Alpine World Ski Championships 2023 – Women's super-G =

FIS Alpine World Ski Championships 2023 at the Women's super-G
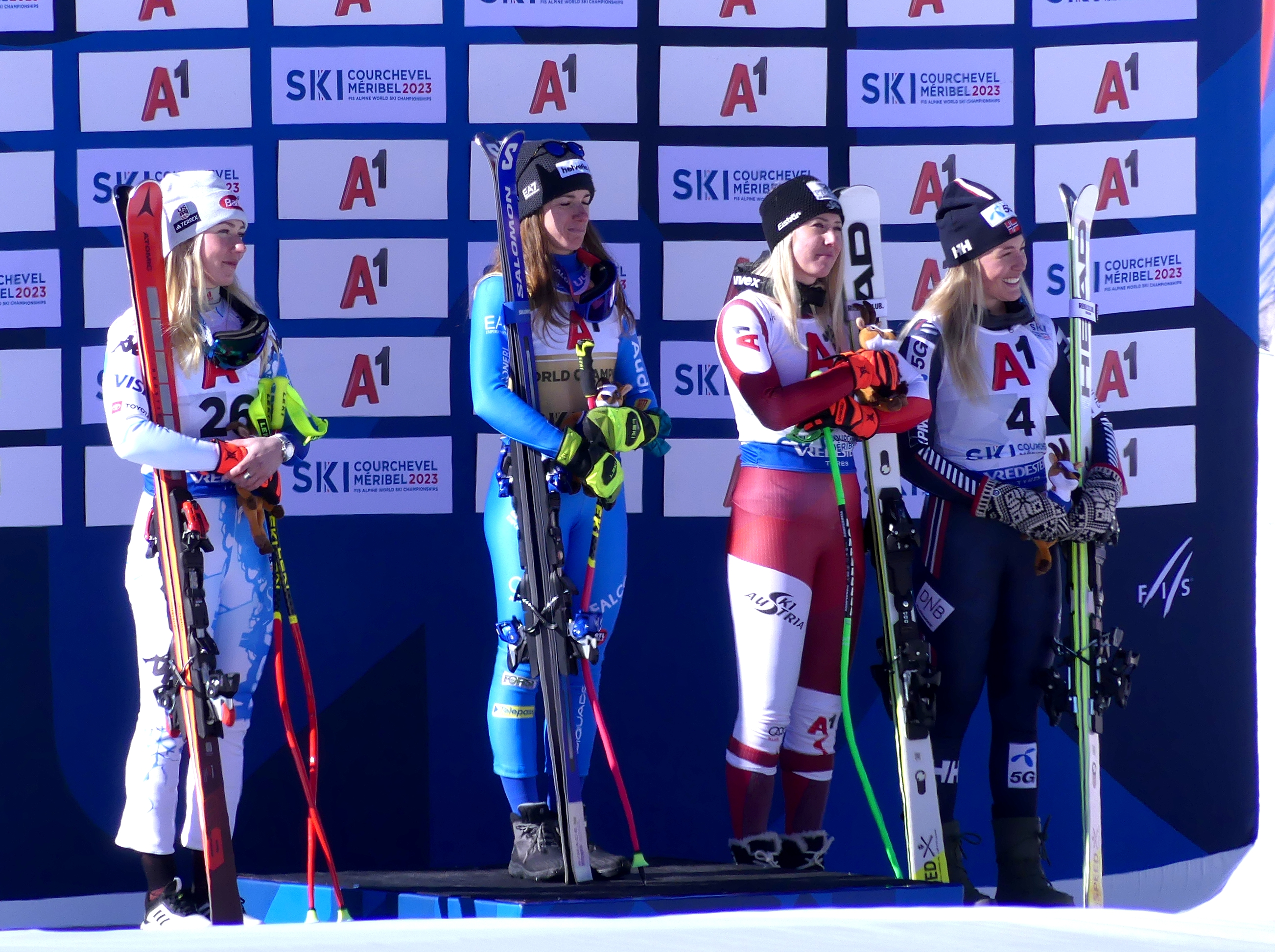
- Venue: Roc de Fer
- Location: Méribel, France
- Dates: 8 February
- Competitors: 37 from 18 nations
- Winning time: 1:28.06

Medalists
gold medal	Marta Bassino	Italy
silver medal	Mikaela Shiffrin	United States
bronze medal	Cornelia Hütter	Austria
bronze medal	Kajsa Vickhoff Lie	Norway

The Women's super-G competition at the FIS Alpine World Ski Championships 2023 was held at Roc de Fer ski course in Méribel on 8 February 2023.

Women's Super-G
- Location: Roc de Fer; Méribel, France
- Vertical: 600 m (1,969 ft)
- Top elevation: 2,065 m (6,775 ft)
- Base elevation: 1,465 m (4,806 ft)
- Longest run: 2.204 km (1.37 mi)

== Results ==
The race was started at 11:30 CET under sunny skies and the snow was compact; the temperature was −6 °C (21 °F) at the start and −9 °C (16 °F) at the finish.

Rank	Bib	Name	Country	Time	Diff
1st place, gold medalist(s)	8	Marta Bassino	Italy	1:28.06	—
2nd place, silver medalist(s)	9	Mikaela Shiffrin	United States	1:28.17	+0.11
3rd place, bronze medalist(s)	6	Cornelia Hütter	Austria	1:28.39	+0.33
3rd place, bronze medalist(s)	4	Kajsa Vickhoff Lie	Norway	1:28.39	+0.33
5	14	Ragnhild Mowinckel	Norway	1:28.42	+0.36
6	11	Lara Gut-Behrami	Switzerland	1:28.43	+0.37
7	30	Alice Robinson	New Zealand	1:28.60	+0.54
8	13	Federica Brignone	Italy	1:28.61	+0.55
9	17	Tessa Worley	France	1:28.64	+0.58
10	3	Michelle Gisin	Switzerland	1:28.75	+0.69
11	20	Sofia Goggia	Italy	1:28.82	+0.76
12	23	Ilka Štuhec	Slovenia	1:28.84	+0.78
13	18	Joana Hählen	Switzerland	1:28.86	+0.80
14	16	Laura Gauché	France	1:28.98	+0.92
15	7	Elena Curtoni	Italy	1:29.07	+1.01
16	10	Romane Miradoli	France	1:29.10	+1.04
17	1	Ramona Siebenhofer	Austria	1:29.12	+1.06
18	25	Emma Aicher	Germany	1:29.21	+1.15
19	15	Mirjam Puchner	Austria	1:29.59	+1.53
20	12	Corinne Suter	Switzerland	1:29.62	+1.56
21	19	Tamara Tippler	Austria	1:29.70	+1.64
22	5	Jasmine Flury	Switzerland	1:29.73	+1.67
23	2	Kira Weidle	Germany	1:29.87	+1.81
24	26	Breezy Johnson	United States	1:30.15	+2.09
25	28	Elvedina Muzaferija	Bosnia and Herzegovina	1:30.21	+2.15
26	22	Marie-Michèle Gagnon	Canada	1:30.48	+2.42
27	35	Greta Small	Australia	1:31.83	+3.77
28	32	Ania Monica Caill	Romania	1:32.38	+4.32
29	36	Noa Szőllős	Israel	1:32.69	+4.63
30	37	Anastasiya Shepilenko	Ukraine	1:33.05	+4.99
31	33	Sabrina Simader	Kenya	1:34.38	+6.32
	21	Isabella Wright	United States	Did not finish	
	24	Valérie Grenier	Canada	Did not finish	
	27	Maryna Gąsienica-Daniel	Poland	Did not finish	
	29	Karen Smadja-Clément	France	Did not finish	
	31	Tricia Mangan	United States	Did not finish	
	34	Cande Moreno	Andorra	Did not finish	
