= 2016 Alpine Skiing World Cup – Women's giant slalom =

Alpine ski discipline year standings

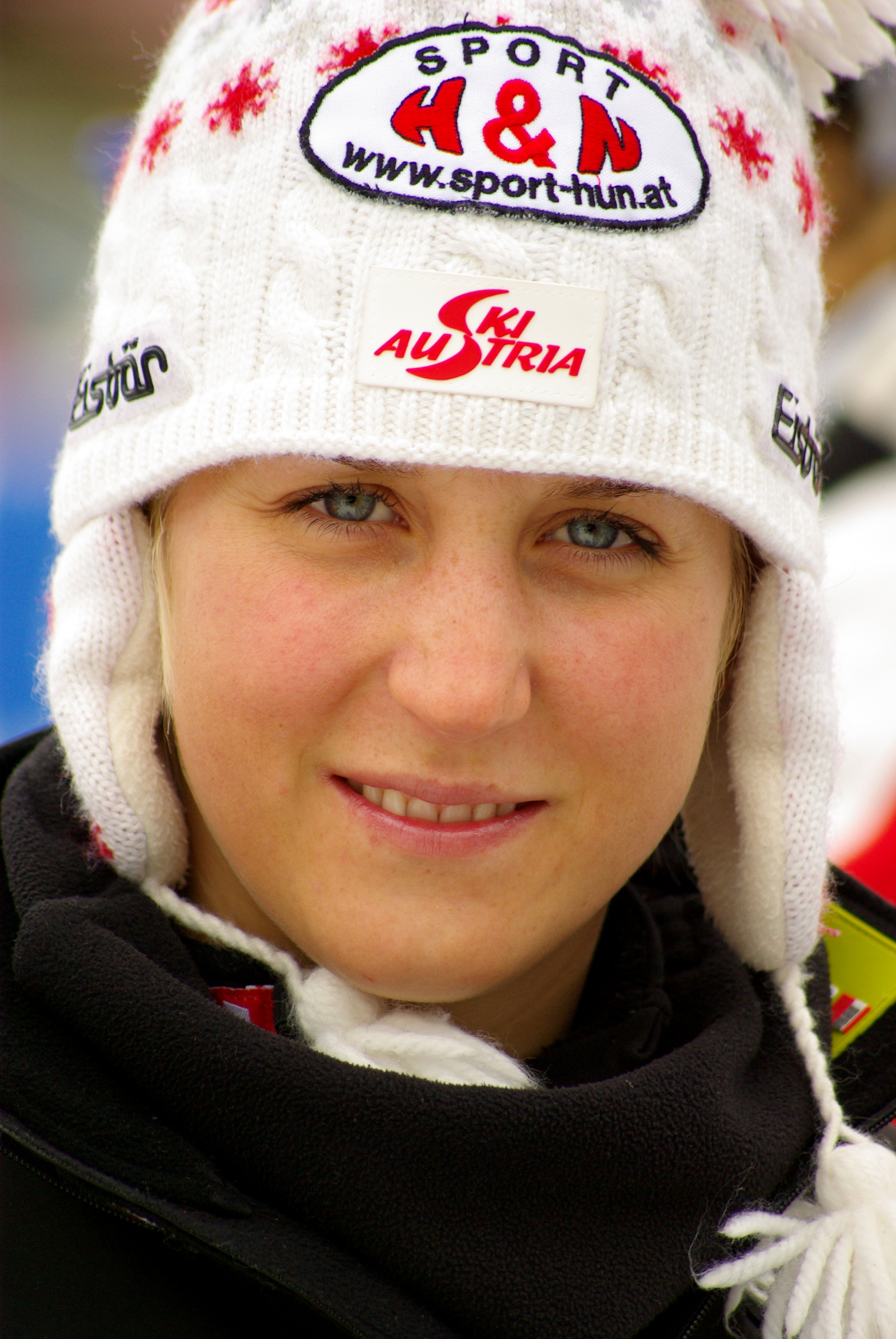
2016 Women's giant slalom World Cup: Eva-Maria Brem of Austria, season champion; 2016 Women's World Cup; Overall • downhill • super-G; giant slalom • slalom • combined
Previous: 2015	Next: 2017

The women's giant slalom competition in the 2016 FIS Alpine Skiing World Cup consisted of nine events, including the World Cup finals in St. Moritz, Switzerland.

Before the start of the season, two-time defending discipline winner Anna Fenninger of Austria suffered a season-ending (and career-threatening) injury, and 2013 discipline winner Tina Maze of Slovenia took the entire 2015–16 season off to determine if she wanted to continue with her career.

The crystal globe for the season then developed into a battle between 2015 runner-up Eva-Maria Brem, also of Austria, and two-time (2011–12) discipline champion Viktoria Rebensburg of Germany. After winning the next-to-last race of the season in Jasná, Brem opened a 52-point lead over Rebensburg, meaning that as long as she finished no worse than fourth in the finals in St. Moritz, Brem would win the championship no matter what Rebensburg did. And that was exactly what happened, as Rebensburg stormed through the last run of the giant slalom at finals for a commanding victory, but Brem, running last, barely managed to hold onto fourth by 0.03 seconds to win the season championship by two points (592 to 590).

== Standings ==
#	Skier	24 Oct 2015; Sölden (Austria)	27 Nov 2015; Aspen (United States)	12 Dec 2015; Åre (Sweden)	20 Dec 2015; Courcheval (France)	28 Dec 2015; Lienz (Austria)	17 Jan 2016; Flachau (Austria)	30 Jan 2016; Maribor (Slovenia)	7 Mar 2016; Jasná (Slovakia)	19 Mar 2016; St. Moritz (Switzerland)	Tot.
	(Austria) Eva-Maria Brem	32	80	80	100	50	50	50	100	50	592
2	(Germany) Viktoria Rebensburg	40	36	24	50	60	100	100	80	100	590
3	(Switzerland) Lara Gut	50	100	20	80	100	12	DNF2	50	60	472
4	(Italy) Federica Brignone	100	60	60	DNF2	45	60	DNF1	60	40	425
5	(Liechtenstein) Tina Weirather	60	24	14	32	80	15	60	16	20	321
6	(Norway) Nina Løseth	13	40	45	80	22	9	45	14	24	292
7	(Slovenia) Ana Drev	DNF1	9	22	36	DNF2	80	80	24	32	283
8	(Sweden) Frida Hansdotter	26	29	40	29	32	DNQ	DNF2	26	22	204
	(Sweden) Maria Pietilä-Holmner	9	12	36	45	DNF2	22	40	20	20	204
10	(France) Taïna Barioz	20	DNF1	26	7	15	29	10	12	80	199
11	(France) Tessa Worley	45	45	50	DNF2	24	10	11	3	0	188
12	(Austria) Michaela Kirchgasser	12	DNF1	15	26	40	14	36	DNF1	36	179
13	(Italy) Marta Bassino	DNF1	18	29	DNF2	15	13	29	45	29	178
14	(Canada) Marie-Michèle Gagnon	6	15	DNF2	18	DNQ	26	24	40	45	174
15	(Italy) Manuela Mölgg	22	50	18	DNQ	DNF2	36	22	22	DNF1	170
16	(Italy) Nadia Fanchini	24	22	DNF1	DNF2	13	40	32	DNF1	16	147
17	(Italy) Irene Curtoni	29	DNF2	8	15	29	DNF2	16	29	0	126
18	(United States) Lindsey Vonn	DNS	DNF1	100	20	DNF1	DNF2	DNF2	DNS		120
19	(France) Adeline Baud-Mugnier	DNS	26	12	22	DNF1	20	DNF1	4	26	110
20	(Austria) Stephanie Brunner	DNQ	11	5	11	DNQ	45	DNF1	32	0	104
21	(United States) Mikaela Shiffrin	80	DNF2	DNS					18	DNF1	98
22	(Italy) Sofia Goggia	15	15	10	40	DNQ	16	DNF1	DNQ	0	96
23	(Italy) Francesca Marsaglia	DNS	DNF2	4	DNQ	36	36	12	DNQ	0	88
24	(Norway) Ragnhild Mowinckel	DNF2	DNQ	DNF1	6	22	DNQ	20	36	0	84
25	(Italy) Elena Curtoni	18	20	DNQ	DNQ	26	DNQ	18	DNQ	0	82
	References										

- Winner
- 2nd place
- 3rd place
- DNF1 = Did Not Finish run 1
- DSQ1 = Disqualified run 1
- DNQ = Did not qualify for run 2
- DNF2 = Did Not Finish run 2
- DSQ2 = Disqualified run 2
- DNS = Did not start
- Updated at 21 March 2016, after all events.

== See also ==
- 2016 Alpine Skiing World Cup – Women's summary rankings
- 2016 Alpine Skiing World Cup – Women's overall
- 2016 Alpine Skiing World Cup – Women's downhill
- 2016 Alpine Skiing World Cup – Women's super-G
- 2016 Alpine Skiing World Cup – Women's slalom
- 2016 Alpine Skiing World Cup – Women's combined
