= 2016 Alpine Skiing World Cup – Women's super-G =

Alpine ski discipline year standings

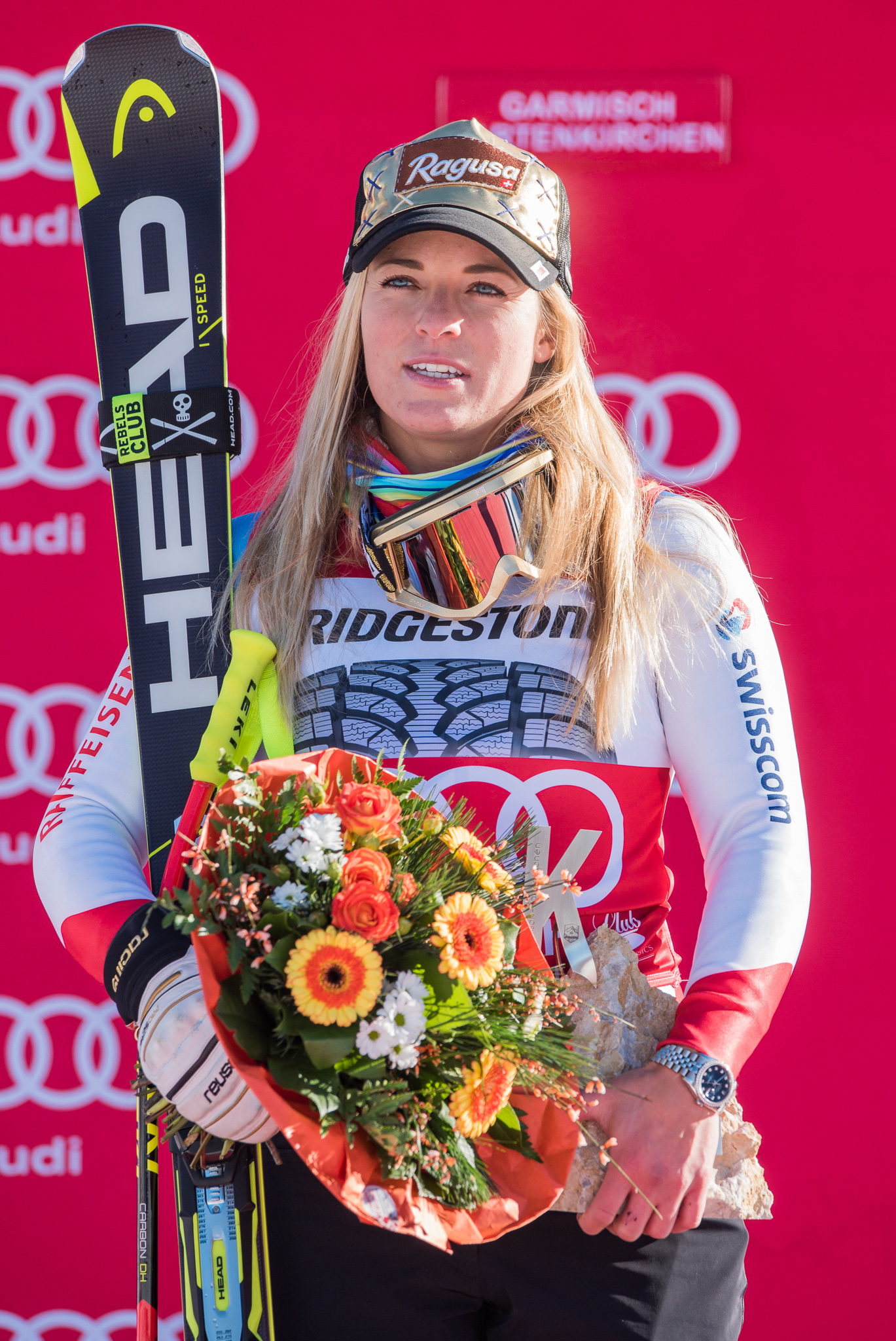
2016 Women's super-G World Cup: Lara Gut of Switzerland, season champion; 2016 Women's World Cup; Overall • downhill • super-G; giant slalom • slalom • combined
Previous: 2015	Next: 2017

The women's super-G competition in the 2016 FIS Alpine Skiing World Cup involved sight events, including the season final in St. Moritz, Switzerland.

The season competition was a two-person battle between 2014 discipline champion Lara Gut from Switzerland and defending discipline champion (and five-time winner) Lindsey Vonn from the USA. Vonn won all of the first three races, but she suffered a season-ending injury in the sixth. Coming into the finals, Gut was still behind Vonn, but she and two other racers (Liechtenstein's Tina Weirather and Austria's Cornelia Hütter) could overtake Vonn with strong performances in the finals. Gut's second-place finish (worth 80 points) gave her the season title, while Weirather's victory (worth 100 points) enabled her to edge into second, with Vonn relegated to third.

== Standings ==
#	Skier	6 Dec 2015; Lake Louise (Canada)	10 Jan 2016; Altenmarkt-Zauchensee (Austria)	24 Jan 2016; Cortina d'Ampezzo (Italy)	7 Feb 2016; Garmisch-Partenkirchen (Germany)	20 Feb 2016; La Thuile (Italy)	27 Feb 2016; Soldeu-El Tarter (Andorra)	12 Mar 2016; Lenzerheide (Switzerland)	17 Mar 2016; St. Moritz (Switzerland)	Tot.
	(Switzerland) Lara Gut	36	80	45	100	80	15	45	80	481
2	(Liechtenstein) Tina Weirather	26	10	80	50	100	20	50	100	436
3	(United States) Lindsey Vonn	100	100	100	60	60	DNF	DNS		420
4	(Austria) Cornelia Hütter	60	60	50	45	14	11	100	60	400
5	(Germany) Viktoria Rebensburg	40	24	60	80	DNF	36	13	40	293
6	(Italy) Federica Brignone	DNS	26	29	29	40	100	20	32	276
7	(Austria) Tamara Tippler	80	20	DNF	10	24	60	60	DNF	254
8	(United States) Laurenne Ross	22	22	18	26	29	80	8	45	250
9	(Italy) Johanna Schnarf	50	29	DNF	15	20	40	40	22	216
10	(Sweden) Kajsa Kling	DNF	32	40	40	15	29	9	50	215
11	(Switzerland) Fabienne Suter	11	DNS	DNF	18	50	DNF	80	26	185
12	(Slovenia) Ilka Štuhec	12	20	20	20	22	24	36	29	183
13	(Italy) Nadia Fanchini	29	50	16	32	DNF	12	14	18	171
14	(Austria) Elisabeth Görgl	1	45	14	36	13	0	29	16	154
15	(Italy) Elena Curtoni	5	14	26	24	36	26	22	DNF	153
16	(Italy) Francesca Marsaglia	24	40	DNF	13	26	16	26	0	145
17	(Austria) Stephanie Venier	8	20	26	22	10	22	24	DNF	132
18	(France) Romane Miradoli	0	8	6	7	45	32	18	DNF	116
	(Switzerland) Corinne Suter	9	13	36	DNF	16	5	1	36	116
20	(Italy) Sofia Goggia	DNS	DNF	16	16	DNF	50	32	DNF	114
21	(France) Tessa Worley	7	12	8	9	32	18	15	DNF	101
22	(Norway) Ragnhild Mowinckel	3	DNF	13	3	18	14	11	20	82
23	(Austria) Nicole Schmidhofer	32	36	DNS						68
24	(Italy) Elena Fanchini	6	5	11	0	DNS	45	0	0	67
25	(Canada) Larisa Yurkiw	18	DNF	22	8	DNF	DNS	10	DNS	58
	References									

- Winner
- 2nd place
- 3rd place
- DNF = Did not finish
- DSQ = Disqualified
- DNS = Did not start
- Updated at 19 March 2016, after all events.

== See also ==
- 2016 Alpine Skiing World Cup – Women's summary rankings
- 2016 Alpine Skiing World Cup – Women's overall
- 2016 Alpine Skiing World Cup – Women's downhill
- 2016 Alpine Skiing World Cup – Women's giant slalom
- 2016 Alpine Skiing World Cup – Women's slalom
- 2016 Alpine Skiing World Cup – Women's combined
