= Corviglia =

Location on the mountain Piz Nair in Switzerland

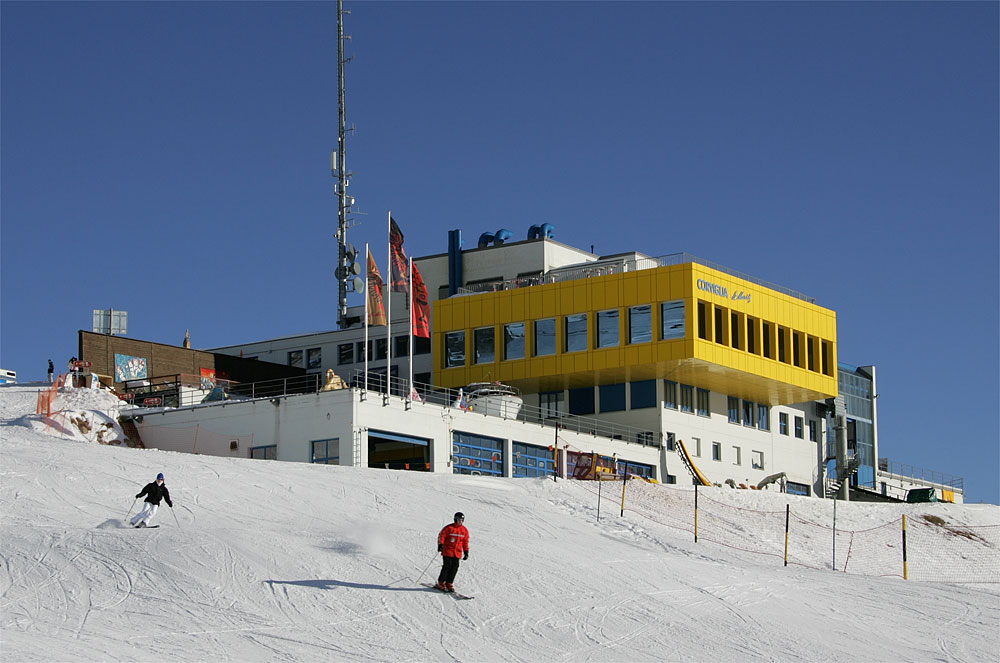
- Corviglia restaurant in December 2006

Highest point
- Elevation: 2,486 m (8,156 ft)
- Coordinates: 46°30′27.2″N 9°49′8.4″E

Geography
- Location within Switzerland
- Location: Graubünden, Switzerland
- Parent range: Albula Alps

Climbing
- Easiest route: Cable car

Corviglia is a location on the eastern slopes of Piz Nair, overlooking St. Moritz in the canton of Graubünden. It lies on the watershed between the rivers Schlattain (Val Saluver) and the Ovel da la Resgia (ending in Lake St. Moritz), at an elevation of 2,486 m (8,156 ft). Corviglia is mainly accessible from the town by the St. Moritz–Corviglia funicular, via Chantarella. At Corviglia, an aerial tramway climbs west to Piz Nair (3,057 m (10,030 ft)), unloading slightly below its summit.

Corviglia is also the name of the ski area directly above St. Moritz. This area, together with the fully integrated Marguns area which is centered above the neighboring town of Celerina, is the largest skiing area in the Engadin. It hosted the alpine skiing events of the 1948 Winter Olympics and the World Championships in 1974 and 2003.
