= 2016 Alpine Skiing World Cup – Women's overall =

Alpine ski discipline year standings

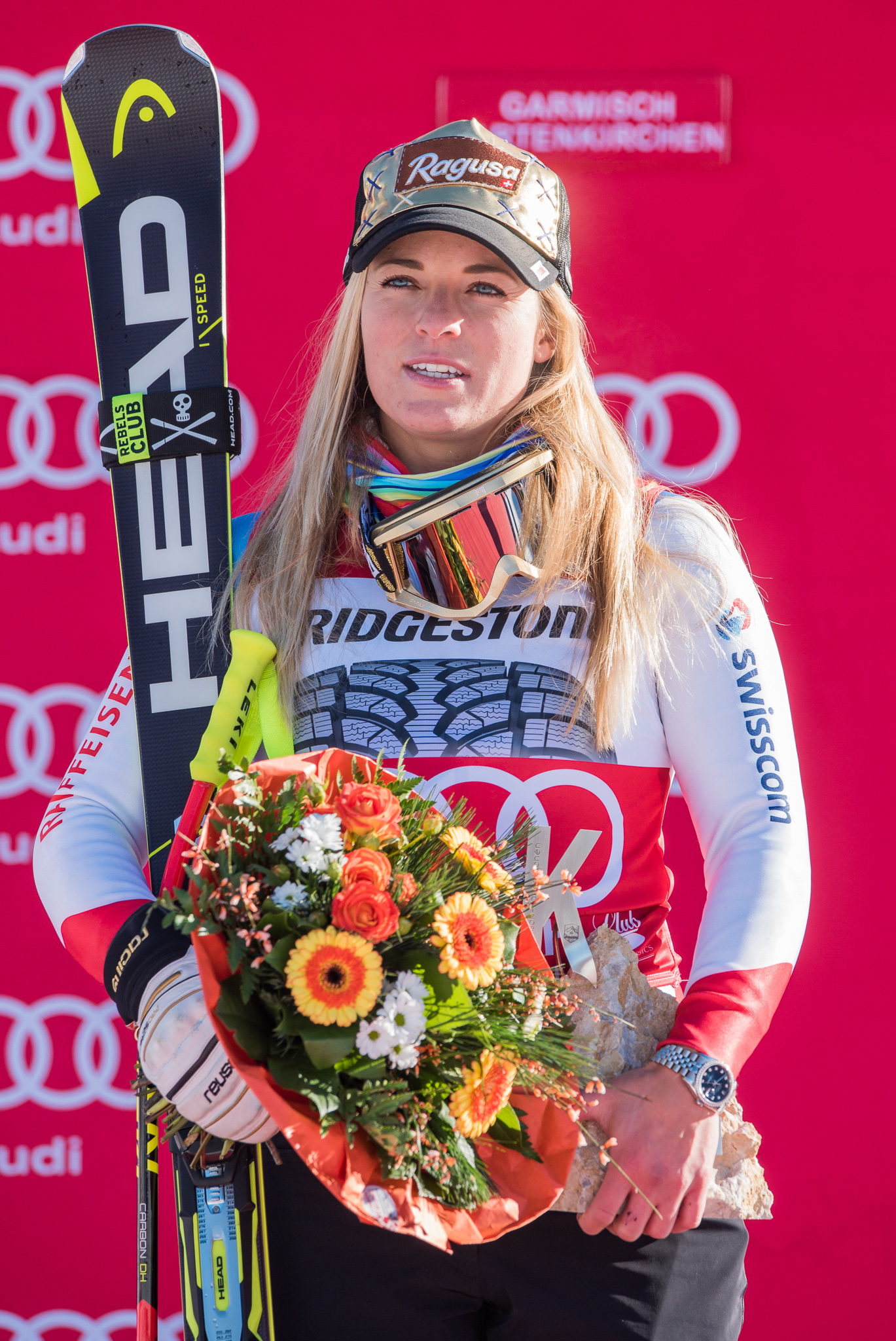
2016 women's overall World Cup: Lara Gut of Switzerland, season champion; 2016 women's World Cup; Overall • downhill • super-g; giant slalom • slalom• combined
Previous: 2015	Next: 2017

The women's overall competition in the 2016 FIS Alpine Skiing World Cup involved 40 events in 5 disciplines: downhill (DH), Super-G (SG), giant slalom (GS), slalom (SL) (which included one city event), and Alpine combined (AC) (which included one super-combined). A city event is a slalom conducted on a two-lane artificial ramp erected in a major city (for example, Stockholm this season, as well as Moscow, Munich, and Oslo); a super-combined (run at Val d'Isère in December 2015) consists of a downhill followed by a one-run slalom, as opposed to an Alpine combined (the other combined race currently contested), which consists of a Super-G followed by a one-run slalom.

At the start of the season, the three still-active prior overall women's champions -- two-time defending champion Anna Fenninger of Austria (2014–15), Tina Maze of Slovenia (2013), and Lindsey Vonn of the USA (2008–10, 2012) -- were all inactive. Fenninger had to miss the entire season due to a serious knee injury in October. Maze, an all-discipline skier who had been runner-up behind Fenninger in 2015, took a full-year hiatus before deciding whether to continue or permanently retire. And Vonn was still recovering from, first, her season-ending injury in early 2015, and then a dog bite, and she didn't return until December 2015. Then, in early December, just a handful of events into the season, Mikaela Shiffrin of the USA, overall fourth last season and slalom discipline champion for the last three seasons, suffered an injury during practice at Åre, which caused her to miss the two months at the heart of the season; she did not return until mid-February (and promptly dominated the competition, although it was too late to contend for the season crown).

With all of the injuries, Vonn, who herself missed more time due to injuries in late December, nevertheless had opened a narrow lead in the overall standings. When the World Cup went to Andorra in late February, Vonn had already won the Downhill discipline for the season and was leading in the Overall, Super-G and Combined disciplines for the season. However, on February 27, during the Super-G in Soldeu, Vonn crashed again near the end of her run while leading. She still raced the next day in the Combined event, although failing to podium, but on Monday a complete medical evaluation in Barcelona revealed multiple significant (not hairline, as she had thought) fractures in her knee from the Super-G crash, which ended her season at once.

After Vonn's injury, 24-year-old Lara Gut of Switzerland, Vonn's closest pursuer, grabbed the overall lead and ended up as the season champion by almost 300 points.

Appropriately, the World Cup season finals were held in St. Moritz, Switzerland for the first time since the World Cup season finals began in 1993, although five of the previous eleven finals were held in Switzerland (all at Lenzerheide).

== Standings ==
#	Skier	DH; 9 races	SG; 8 races	GS; 9 races	SL; 11 races	AC; 3 races	Tot.
	(Switzerland) Lara Gut	394	481	472	15	160	1,522
2	(United States) Lindsey Vonn	580	420	120	15	100	1,235
3	(Germany) Viktoria Rebensburg	264	293	590	0	0	1,147
4	(Liechtenstein) Tina Weirather	244	436	321	15	0	1,016
5	(Sweden) Frida Hansdotter	0	0	204	711	0	915
6	(Switzerland) Wendy Holdener	0	7	51	561	198	817
7	(Austria) Cornelia Hütter	387	400	0	0	24	811
8	(Italy) Federica Brignone	9	276	425	27	50	787
9	(Norway) Nina Løseth	0	0	292	373	0	665
10	(United States) Mikaela Shiffrin	0	18	98	500	32	648
	(Switzerland) Fabienne Suter	463	185	0	0	0	648
12	(Austria) Eva-Maria Brem	0	0	592	55	0	647
13	(Slovakia) Veronika Velez-Zuzulová	0	0	0	626	0	626
14	(Italy) Nadia Fanchini	300	171	147	0	0	618
15	(Austria) Michaela Kirchgasser	0	4	179	280	153	616
16	(Canada) Marie-Michèle Gagnon	0	8	174	271	145	598
17	(Sweden) Kajsa Kling	218	215	63	0	44	540
18	(United States) Laurenne Ross	224	250	0	0	52	526
19	(Sweden) Maria Pietilä-Holmner	0	0	204	292	0	496
20	(Czech Republic) Šárka Strachová	0	0	0	493	0	493
21	(Italy) Johanna Schnarf	160	216	0	0	90	466
22	(Canada) Larisa Yurkiw	407	58	0	0	0	465
23	(Italy) Elena Curtoni	188	153	82	0	32	455
24	(Slovakia) Petra Vlhová	0	0	18	389	0	407
25	(Italy) Francesca Marsaglia	102	145	88	0	65	400

- Leader
- 2nd place
- 3rd place
- Updated at 19 March 2016, after all events

== See also ==
- 2016 Alpine Skiing World Cup – Women's summary rankings
- 2016 Alpine Skiing World Cup – Women's downhill
- 2016 Alpine Skiing World Cup – Women's super-G
- 2016 Alpine Skiing World Cup – Women's giant slalom
- 2016 Alpine Skiing World Cup – Women's slalom
- 2016 Alpine Skiing World Cup – Women's combined
- 2016 Alpine Skiing World Cup – Men's overall
