= 2016 Alpine Skiing World Cup – Women's downhill =

Alpine ski discipline year standings

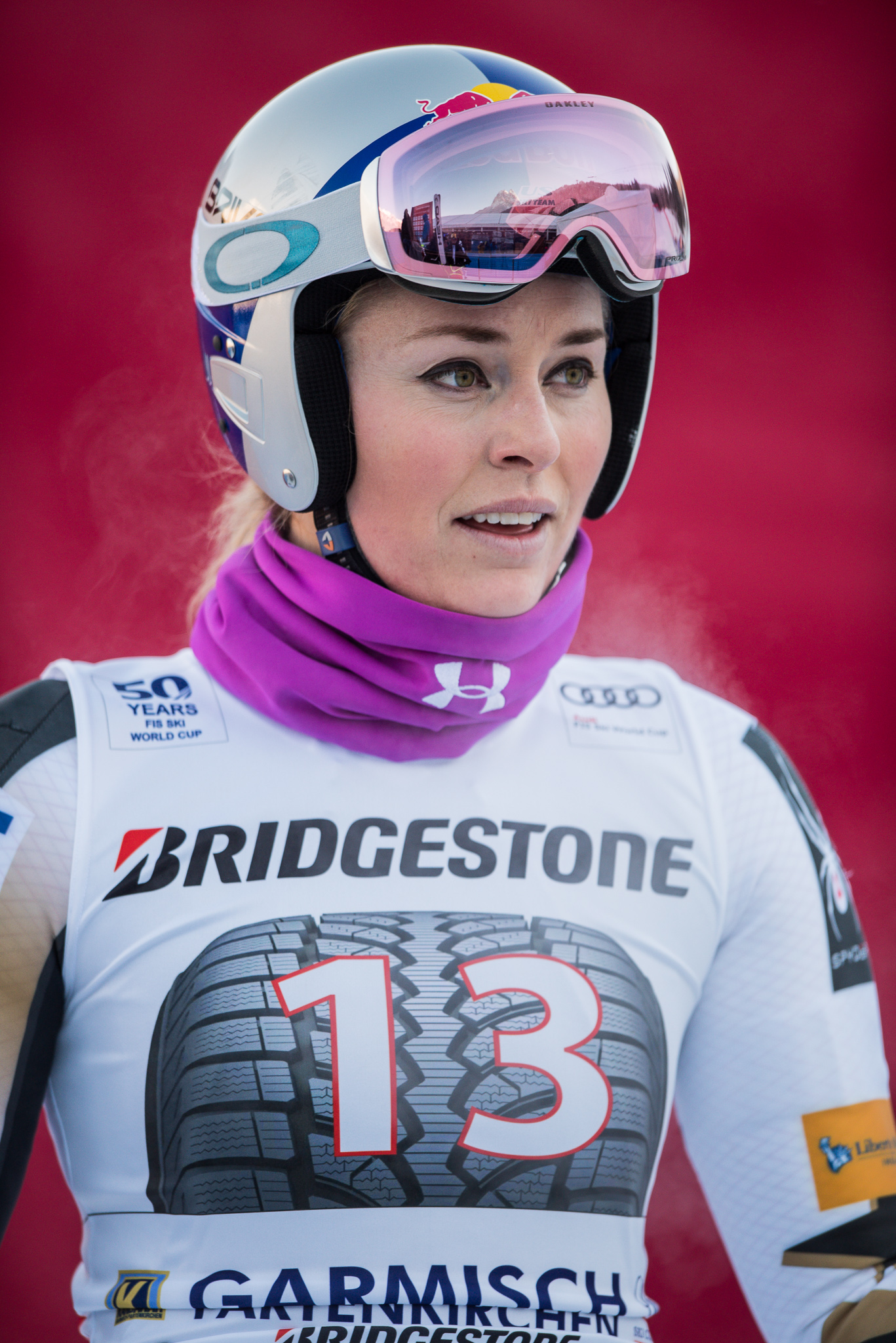
2016 Women's downhill World Cup: Lindsey Vonn of USA, season champion; 2016 Women's World Cup; Overall • Downhill • Super-G; giant slalom • slalom • Combined
| Previous: 2015 | Next: 2017 |

The women's downhill competition in the 2016 FIS Alpine Skiing World Cup involved nine events, including the season finale in St. Moritz, Switzerland.

Defending champion Lindsey Vonn of the USA won five of the first six races in the season and, after finishing second in a race at La Thuile (the Italian side of Mont Blanc), wrapped the season title (her eighth in the discipline) with one race remaining -- which was fortunate, as Vonn suffered a season ending injury in the very next race (a Super-G). The downhill at Altenmarkt-Zauchensee was conducted in a rare two-run format due to the course having to be shortened, and 1970s World Cup great Annemarie Moser-Pröll was on hand to congratulate Vonn for equaling (and then surpassing) her all-time record total of World Cup downhill wins.

At the finals, oft-injured 28-year-old Canadian downhiller Larisa Yurkiw, who was just finishing her best season (having been in second place in the season standings (behind Vonn) before the finals and ending up in third), announced her retirement effective immediately.

== Standings ==
| # | Skier | 4 Dec 2015; Lake Louise (Canada) | 5 Dec 2015; Lake Louise (Canada) | 19 Dec 2015; Val d'Isère (France) | 9 Jan 2016; Altenmarkt-Zauchensee (Austria) | 23 Jan 2016; Cortina d'Ampezzo (Italy) | 6 Feb 2016; Garmisch-Partenkirchen (Germany) | 19 Feb 2016; La Thuile (Italy) | 20 Feb 2016; La Thuile (Italy) | 16 Mar 2016; St. Moritz (Switzerland) | Tot. |
| | (United States) Lindsey Vonn | 100 | 100 | DNF | 100 | 100 | 100 | DNF | 80 | DNS | 580 |
| 2 | (Switzerland) Fabienne Suter | 40 | 80 | 80 | DNS | 13 | 80 | 50 | 40 | 80 | 463 |
| 3 | (Canada) Larisa Yurkiw | 22 | 36 | 60 | 80 | 80 | 50 | 29 | 50 | 0 | 407 |
| 4 | (Switzerland) Lara Gut | 40 | 32 | 100 | DNF1 | 60 | 18 | 100 | 24 | 20 | 394 |
| 5 | (Austria) Cornelia Hütter | 80 | 60 | 50 | 60 | 22 | 22 | 80 | 13 | 0 | 387 |
| 6 | (Italy) Nadia Fanchini | 32 | 50 | DNF | 18 | 8 | 32 | 60 | 100 | 0 | 300 |
| 7 | (Germany) Viktoria Rebensburg | 24 | 32 | 18 | 40 | 32 | 60 | 32 | 26 | DNF | 264 |
| 8 | (Liechtenstein) Tina Weirather | 13 | 20 | 45 | DNF2 | 50 | 40 | 40 | 0 | 36 | 244 |
| 9 | (Switzerland) Corinne Suter | 11 | 40 | 45 | 22 | 24 | 26 | 22 | 18 | 32 | 240 |
| 10 | (United States) Laurenne Ross | 12 | 10 | 26 | 13 | 12 | 45 | 45 | 45 | 16 | 224 |
| 11 | (Sweden) Kajsa Kling | 20 | 45 | 13 | 50 | 36 | 15 | DNF | 10 | 29 | 218 |
| 12 | (Austria) Mirjam Puchner | 15 | 18 | 32 | DNF2 | 29 | 0 | 16 | 0 | 100 | 210 |
| 13 | (Austria) Elisabeth Görgl | 20 | 4 | 20 | 29 | 20 | 20 | 26 | 20 | 50 | 209 |
| 14 | (Hungary) Edit Miklós | 9 | 9 | 29 | 14 | 40 | 36 | 20 | 32 | 18 | 207 |
| 15 | (United States) Stacey Cook | 45 | 24 | 15 | 32 | 16 | 14 | 12 | 7 | 24 | 189 |
| 16 | (Italy) Elena Curtoni | 8 | 22 | 12 | 11 | 10 | DNF | 36 | 29 | 60 | 188 |
| 17 | (Italy) Johanna Schnarf | 14 | DNF | 0 | 8 | 45 | 8 | 24 | 16 | 45 | 160 |
| 18 | (France) Margot Bailet | 50 | 6 | 9 | 36 | 0 | 0 | 0 | 0 | 26 | 127 |
| | (Switzerland) Ramona Siebenhofer | 60 | DNF | 18 | DNF2 | 18 | DNF | 7 | DNF | 24 | 127 |
| 20 | (Italy) Verena Stuffer | 29 | 12 | 4 | DNQ | 29 | DNF | 8 | 4 | 40 | 126 |
| 21 | (Austria) Nicole Schmidhofer | DNF | 32 | 36 | 45 | DNS | | | | | 113 |
| 22 | (Italy) Daniela Merighetti | DNS | | 0 | 16 | 3 | 16 | 10 | 60 | DNF | 105 |
| 23 | (Italy) Francesca Marsaglia | 0 | 3 | 11 | 26 | 15 | 5 | 6 | 36 | DNF | 102 |
| 24 | (Italy) Elena Fanchini | 16 | 16 | 2 | 15 | 7 | 29 | 13 | 0 | 0 | 98 |
| 25 | (Slovenia) Ilka Štuhec | 5 | 8 | 24 | 20 | 14 | DSQ | 14 | 11 | 0 | 96 |
| | References | | | | | | | | | | |

- Winner
- 2nd place
- 3rd place
- DNF = Did Not Finish
- DSQ = Disqualified
- DNS = Did not start
- DNQ = Did not qualify for run 2 (Altenmarkt only)
- DNF1 = Did Not Finish run 1 (Altenmarkt only)
- DNF2 = Did Not Finish run 2 (Altenmarkt only)
- Updated at 21 March 2016, after all events.

== See also ==
- 2016 Alpine Skiing World Cup – Women's summary rankings
- 2016 Alpine Skiing World Cup – Women's overall
- 2016 Alpine Skiing World Cup – Women's super-G
- 2016 Alpine Skiing World Cup – Women's giant slalom
- 2016 Alpine Skiing World Cup – Women's slalom
- 2016 Alpine Skiing World Cup – Women's combined
