= 2016 Alpine Skiing World Cup – Women's slalom =

Alpine ski discipline year standings

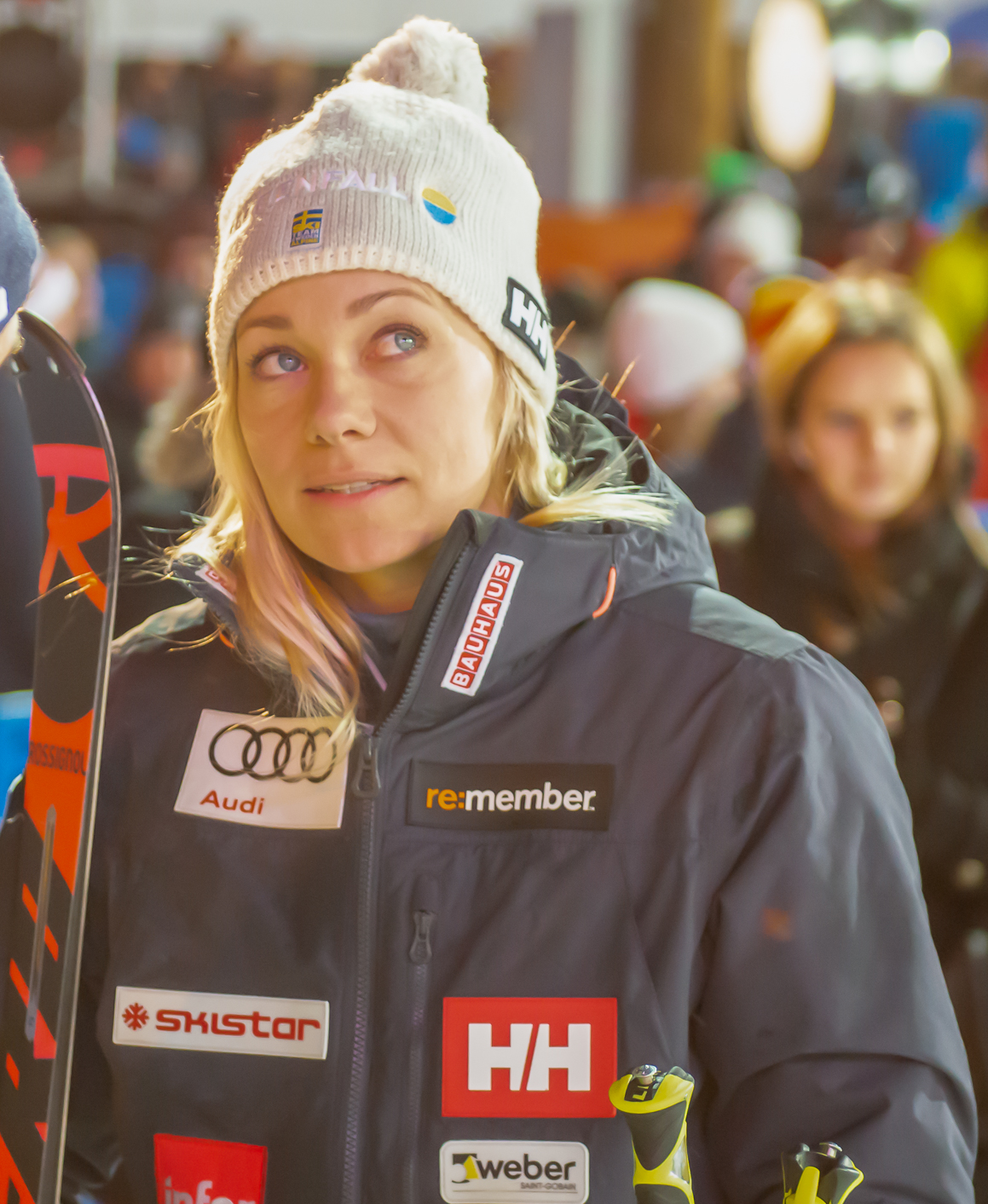
2016 Women's slalom World Cup: Frida Hansdotter of Sweden, season champion; 2016 Women's World Cup; Overall • downhill • super-G; giant slalom • slalom • combined
Previous: 2015	Next: 2017

The women's slalom competition in the 2016 FIS Alpine Skiing World Cup involved 11 events, including one parallel slalom (a city event, which only allows for 16 competitors) and the season finale in St. Moritz, Switzerland.

Three-time defending discipline champion Mikaela Shiffrin from the United States won the first two slaloms in the season, but then suffered an injury during training in Åre, Sweden in early December, which caused her to miss the two months at the heart of the season; she did not return until mid-February (and won all three slaloms she entered, although it was too late for the season crown).

Without Shiffrin competing, Frida Hansdotter of Sweden, who had been runner-up in the discipline the prior two seasons, overtook Shiffrin and jumped into the lead, and even a late push from Slovak skier Veronika Velez-Zuzulová did not prevent Hansdotter from clinching the championship before the finals.

== Standings ==
Parallel Slalom (PS) or City Event (CE)

#	Skier	28 Nov 2015; Aspen (United States)	29 Nov 2015; Aspen (United States)	13 Dec 2015; Åre (Sweden)	29 Dec 2015; Lienz (Austria)	5 Jan 2016; Santa Caterina (Italy)	12 Jan 2016; Flachau (Austria)	15 Jan 2016; Flachau (Austria)	15 Feb 2016; Crans Montana (Switzerland)	23 Feb 2016; Stockholm (CE) (Sweden)	6 Mar 2016; Jasná (Slovakia)	19 Mar 2016; St. Moritz (Switzerland)	Tot.
	(Sweden) Frida Hansdotter	60	80	80	100	45	60	80	40	80	26	60	711
2	(Slovakia) Veronika Velez-Zuzulová	80	DNF1	40	40	60	100	100	26	40	60	80	626
3	(Switzerland) Wendy Holdener	36	11	45	80	40	50	40	29	100	80	50	561
4	(United States) Mikaela Shiffrin	100	100	DNS					100	DNS	100	100	500
5	(Czech Republic) Šárka Strachová	50	60	36	45	80	80	45	36	DNS	32	29	493
6	(Slovakia) Petra Vlhová	24	36	100	60	DNF1	40	60	DNF2	40	29	0	389
7	(France) Nastasia Noens	40	18	29	22	26	32	50	80	40	45	DNF2	382
8	(Norway) Nina Løseth	14	32	60	DNF1	100	45	36	DNF1	50	36	DNF2	373
9	(Sweden) Maria Pietilä-Holmner	45	22	26	24	32	10	11	DNF1	60	22	40	292
10	(Austria) Michaela Kirchgasser	DNF1	40	50	DNF2	50	DNF2	18	12	15	50	45	280
11	(Canada) Marie-Michèle Gagnon	32	16	DNF1	26	36	DNF2	20	60	15	40	26	271
12	(Austria) Carmen Thalmann	DNF1	45	22	50	22	DNQ	29	24	40	DNF2	32	264
13	(United States) Resi Stiegler	16	26	13	16	18	16	3	32	15	7	24	186
14	(Switzerland) Michelle Gisin	20	20	16	36	DNF2	26	32	DNF2	15	DNF1	DNF1	165
15	(France) Anne-Sophie Barthet	DNQ	26	DNF2	15	29	22	14	10	DNS	9	36	161
16	(Austria) Bernadette Schild	DNF1	DNF2	DNQ	18	10	13	9	50	DNS	20	20	140
17	(Canada) Erin Mielzynski	26	50	DNF1	DNQ	20	DNF2	22	DNF2	DNS	DNQ	18	136
18	(Italy) Irene Curtoni	13	DNF2	10	32	DNF1	29	13	9	DNS	16	DNF1	133
19	(Sweden) Anna Swenn-Larsson	10	7	DNF1	11	12	36	DNF1	45	DNS	DNF2	0	121
20	(Sweden) Emelie Wikström	DNF1	15	32	9	DNF2	24	DNF1	11	DNS	11	DNF2	102
21	(Germany) Christina Geiger	DNF1	DNF1	24	DNF2	15	12	12	16	DNS	DNF2	16	95
22	(Germany) Lena Dürr	DNF1	DNF1	7	14	DNQ	18	10	13	DNS	8	22	92
23	(Austria) Katharina Truppe	18	DNQ	20	29	DNF1	DNF1	6	18	DNS	DNF1	0	91
24	(Italy) Chiara Costazza	15	DNF2	8	DNF2	DNF1	20	15	DNQ	DNS	24	0	82
25	(Austria) Julia Grünwald	DNF1	13	4	DNF1	DNQ	DNF2	26	14	DNS	15	DNF1	72
	References												

- Winner
- 2nd place
- 3rd place
- DNF1 = Did Not Finish run 1
- DSQ1 = Disqualified run 1
- DNQ = Did not qualify for run 2
- DNF2 = Did Not Finish run 2
- DSQ2 = Disqualified run 2
- DNS = Did Not Start
- Updated at 21 March 2016, after all events.

== See also ==
- 2016 Alpine Skiing World Cup – Women's summary rankings
- 2016 Alpine Skiing World Cup – Women's overall
- 2016 Alpine Skiing World Cup – Women's downhill
- 2016 Alpine Skiing World Cup – Women's super-G
- 2016 Alpine Skiing World Cup – Women's giant slalom
- 2016 Alpine Skiing World Cup – Women's combined
