= Piz Nair =

Mountain of the Albula Alps in Switzerland

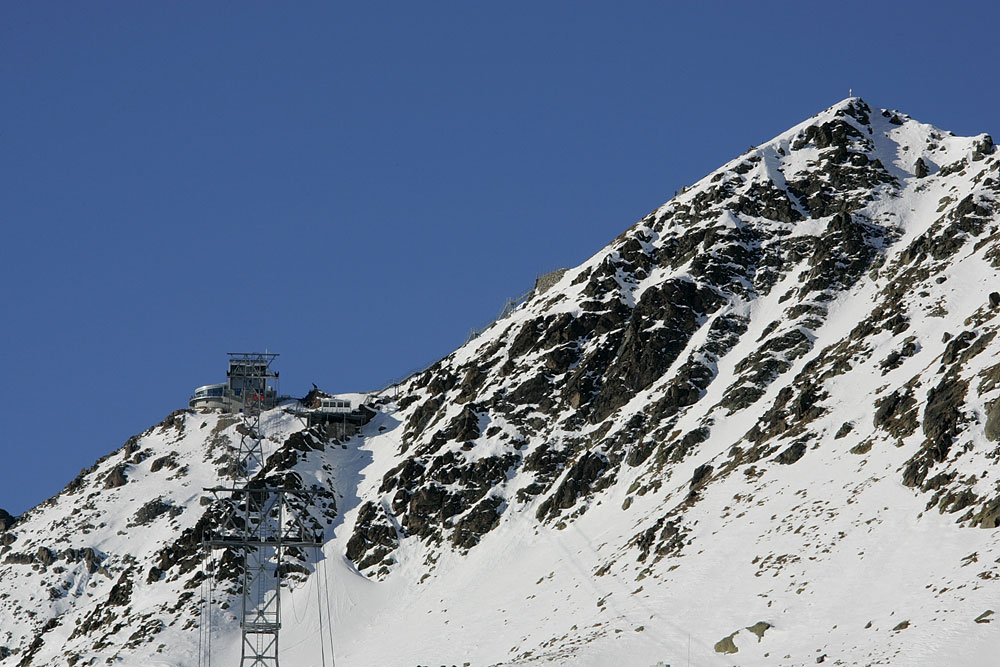
- Piz Nair cable car station in 2006

Highest point
- Elevation: 3,056 m (10,026 ft)
- Prominence: 183 m (600 ft)
- Parent peak: Piz Ot
- Coordinates: 46°30′22.5″N 9°47′14.8″E

Geography
- Location within Switzerland
- Location: Graubünden, Switzerland
- Parent range: Albula Alps

Climbing
- Easiest route: Cable car

Location of Piz Nair in the Alps of Europe

Piz Nair (3,056 metres (10,026 ft)) is a mountain of the Albula Alps in Switzerland, overlooking St. Moritz in the canton of Graubünden. The peak is easily accessible from the village with a funicular and a cable car; the upper station unloads 30 metres (100 ft) below the summit. Below the summit to the east is the Corviglia ski area.

The mountain hosted the alpine skiing events for the 1948 Winter Olympics in neighboring St. Moritz. It also hosted the World Championships in 1934, 1974, 2003, and 2017.

== Gallery ==
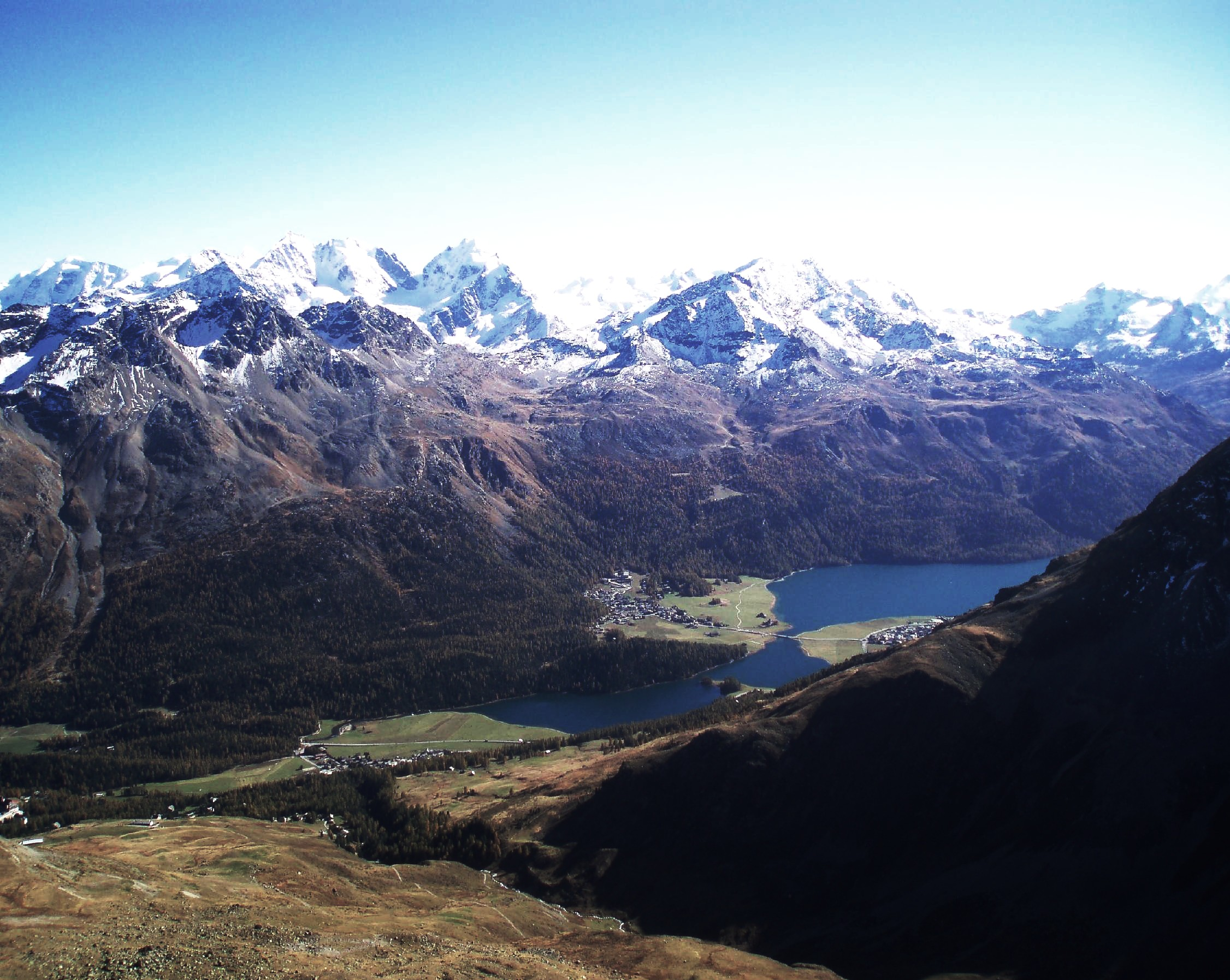
The Engadin Valley from the summit

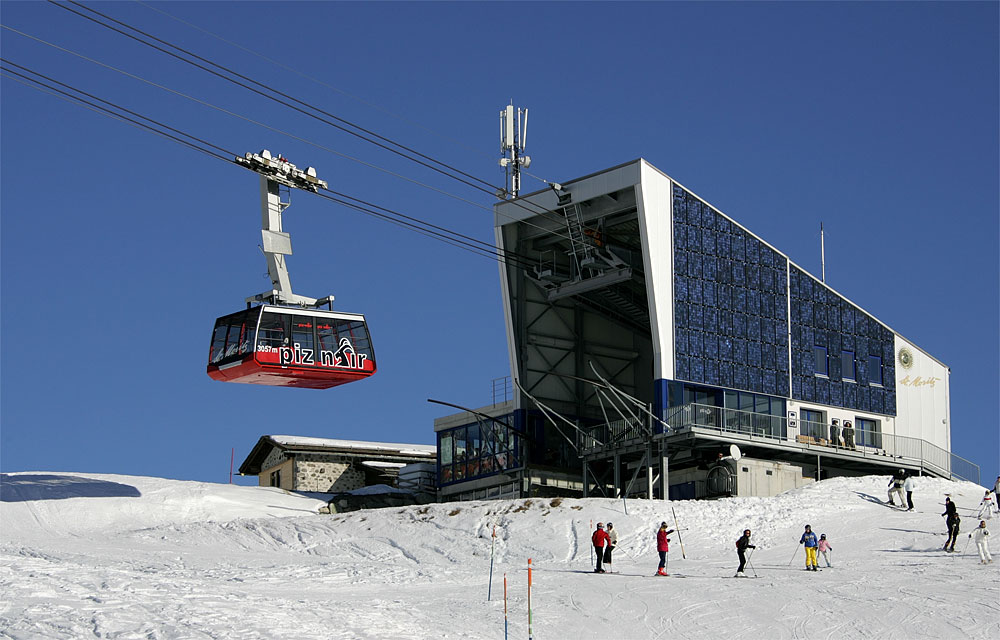
Corviglia intermediate station

== See also ==
- List of mountains of Switzerland accessible by public transport
- Corviglia
- St. Moritz–Corviglia Funicular
