= 2019 Alpine Skiing World Cup – Women's downhill =

Alpine ski discipline year standings

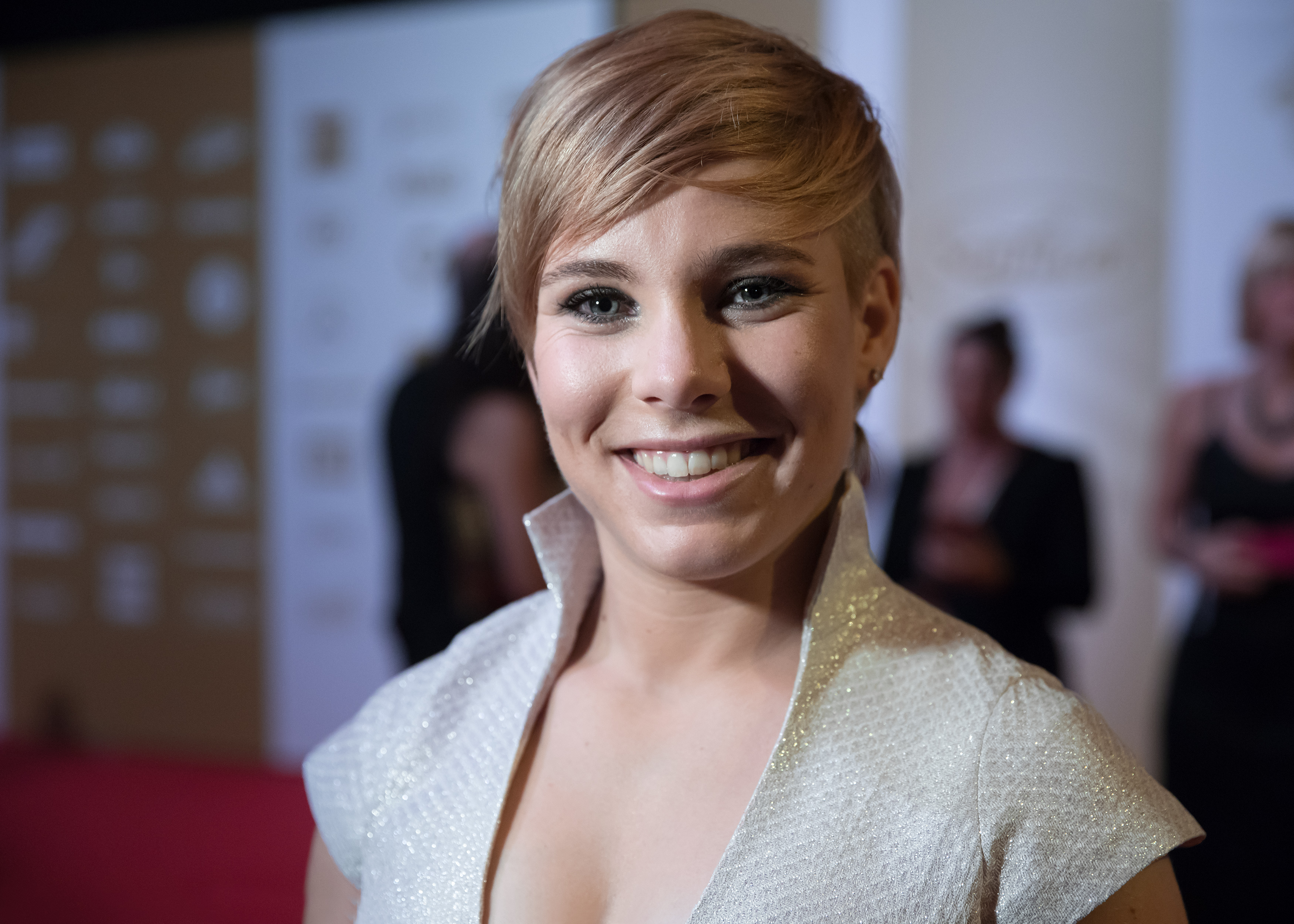
2019 Women's downhill World Cup: Nicole Schmidhofer of Austria, season champion; 2019 Women's World Cup; Overall • Downhill • super-G; giant slalom • slalom • combined
Previous: 2018	Next: 2020

The women's downhill in the 2019 FIS Alpine Skiing World Cup involved eight events, including the season finals in Soldeu, Andorra. Defending discipline champion Sofia Goggia of Italy fractured her ankle prior to the start of the season and missed five of the eight events, ending her chances to repeat. In addition, 2018 runner-up Lindsey Vonn of the USA, who had closed the prior season by winning all of the final four downhills and needed only four more victories to equal Ingemar Stenmark's all-time World Cup victory record, began the season injured and announced her planned retirement at the end of the season, but was hampered during her comeback by her cumulative injuries, and finally retired immediately after the conclusion of the 2019 World Ski Championships.

Among this wide=open field, Austrian skier Nicole Schmidhofer grabbed the lead in the discipline going into the next-to-last race of the season at Crans Montana in Switzerland, where a bizarre timing mishap occurred. In a race won by Goggia after her return, Schmidhofer was originally announced as placing third in the downhill, but before the podium, the placings were controversially changed and Schmidhofer was demoted to fourth behind Goggia and two Swiss skiers, Joana Hählen and Lara Gut-Behrami. However, three days later, the official standings were again changed as, after a review of the adjustments made due to a timer misplacement, it turned out that four Swiss skiers (including both Hählen and Gut-Behrami) had been given incorrect adjustments, and Schmidhofer was moved up to second, giving her a 90-point lead with one race to go, virtually clinching the discipline championship for the season. Schmidhofer then secured the title for 2019 at the season finals in Soldeu, Andorra when her nearest rival, fellow Austrian Ramona Siebenhofer, failed to win the race.

The season was interrupted by the 2019 World Ski Championships, which were held from 4–17 February in Åre, Sweden. The women's downhill was held on 10 February.

== Standings ==
#	Skier	30 Nov 2018; Lake Louise (Canada)	1 Dec 2018; Lake Louise (Canada)	18 Dec 2018; Val Gardena/Gröden (Italy)	18 Jan 2019; Cortina d'Ampezzo (Italy)	19 Jan 2019; Cortina d'Ampezzo (Italy)	27 Jan 2019; Garmisch-Partenkirchen (Germany)	23 Feb 2019; Crans Montana (Switzerland)	13 Mar 2019; Soldeu (Andorra)	Total
	(Austria) Nicole Schmidhofer	100	100	26	22	80	36	80	24	468
2	(Austria) Stephanie Venier	50	29	36	60	20	100	45	32	372
3	(Austria) Ramona Siebenhofer	20	40	60	100	100	26	8	0	354
4	(Slovenia) Ilka Štuhec	40	18	100	80	60	45	DNF	DNS	343
5	(Germany) Kira Weidle	60	24	32	32	50	60	20	29	307
6	(Switzerland) Corinne Suter	22	32	14	50	0	50	60	60	288
7	(Italy) Sofia Goggia	DNS					80	100	40	220
8	(Italy) Nicol Delago	12	45	80	DNF	24	DNF	22	36	219
9	(Switzerland) Michelle Gisin	80	60	13	18	36	DNS			207
10	(Italy) Nadia Fanchini	DNF	36	3	20	20	40	32	50	201
11	(Austria) Mirjam Puchner	0	4	40	12	0	20	13	100	189
12	(Germany) Viktoria Rebensburg	15	13	DNS	24	45	DNS		80	177
13	(Austria) Cornelia Hütter	26	80	DNS	29	40	DNF	DNS		175
14	(France) Romane Miradoli	15	14	20	45	15	14	26	20	169
15	(Liechtenstein) Tina Weirather	45	DNF	24	0	14	15	15	26	139
16	(Switzerland) Joana Hählen	32	22	8	7	9	10	50	DNF	138
17	(Austria) Tamara Tippler	0	3	15	36	20	DNF	14	45	133
18	(Switzerland) Lara Gut-Behrami	18	0	32	8	8	22	40	DNS	128
19	(Switzerland) Jasmine Flury	11	11	50	12	12	DNF	29	0	125
20	(Austria) Ricarda Haaser	8	12	20	16	5	29	10	16	116
21	(Italy) Federica Brignone	6	15	DNS	7	22	DNF	36	18	104
22	(Germany) Michaela Wenig	0	2	45	14	6	8	0	22	97
23	(Norway) Ragnhild Mowinckel	3	6	13	10	13	16	24	DNS	85
24	(Czech Republic) Ester Ledecká	10	26	2	14	32	0	DNS	0	84
25	(United States) Mikaela Shiffrin	29	50	DNS						79
	References									

- Winner
- 2nd place
- 3rd place
- DNF = Did Not Finish
- DNS = Did Not Start
- Updated at 18 March 2019, after all events.

== See also ==
- 2019 Alpine Skiing World Cup – Women's summary rankings
- 2019 Alpine Skiing World Cup – Women's overall
- 2019 Alpine Skiing World Cup – Women's super-G
- 2019 Alpine Skiing World Cup – Women's giant slalom
- 2019 Alpine Skiing World Cup – Women's slalom
- 2019 Alpine Skiing World Cup – Women's combined
