= FIS Alpine World Ski Championships 2019 – Women's super-G =

Women's super-G at the FIS Alpine World Ski Championships 2019
- Venue: Åre ski resort
- Location: Åre, Sweden
- Dates: 5 February
- Competitors: 43 from 18 nations
- Winning time: 1:04.89

Medalists
gold medal	Mikaela Shiffrin	United States
silver medal	Sofia Goggia	Italy
bronze medal	Corinne Suter	Switzerland

Women's Super-G
- Location: Åre, Sweden
- Vertical: 502 m (1,647 ft)
- Top elevation: 898 m (2,946 ft)
- Base elevation: 396 m (1,299 ft)

The Women's super-G competition at the FIS Alpine World Ski Championships 2019 was held on 5 February 2019 in Åre, Jämtland County, Sweden, and was the first event of the championships.

== Results ==
The race was started at 12:30. Due to high winds, its start was lowered 73 m (240 ft), shortening the length by 0.233 km (0.14 mi) to 1.67 km (1.04 mi).

Rank	Bib	Name	Country	Time	Diff
1st place, gold medalist(s)	15	Mikaela Shiffrin	United States	1:04.89	
2nd place, silver medalist(s)	3	Sofia Goggia	Italy	1:04.91	+0.02
3rd place, bronze medalist(s)	4	Corinne Suter	Switzerland	1:04.94	+0.05
4	19	Viktoria Rebensburg	Germany	1:04.96	+0.07
5	12	Nadia Fanchini	Italy	1:05.03	+0.14
6	13	Ragnhild Mowinckel	Norway	1:05.05	+0.16
7	8	Francesca Marsaglia	Italy	1:05.13	+0.24
8	11	Ilka Štuhec	Slovenia	1:05.15	+0.26
9	5	Lara Gut-Behrami	Switzerland	1:05.37	+0.48
10	17	Federica Brignone	Italy	1:05.43	+0.54
11	7	Nicole Schmidhofer	Austria	1:05.58	+0.69
12	10	Tamara Tippler	Austria	1:05.61	+0.72
13	24	Kajsa Vickhoff Lie	Norway	1:05.82	+0.93
14	6	Wendy Holdener	Switzerland	1:05.99	+1.10
15	18	Ramona Siebenhofer	Austria	1:06.08	+1.19
16	2	Tessa Worley	France	1:06.48	+1.59
17	20	Romane Miradoli	France	1:06.53	+1.64
18	23	Kira Weidle	Germany	1:06.60	+1.71
19	27	Valérie Grenier	Canada	1:06.67	+1.78
20	28	Lisa Hörnblad	Sweden	1:06.87	+1.98
21	25	Marie-Michèle Gagnon	Canada	1:06.91	+2.02
22	37	Alice Merryweather	United States	1:07.22	+2.33
23	26	Tiffany Gauthier	France	1:07.34	+2.45
24	36	Kateřina Pauláthová	Czech Republic	1:07.42	+2.53
25	42	Greta Small	Australia	1:07.44	+2.55
26	41	Ida Dannewitz	Sweden	1:07.63	+2.74
27	29	Ester Ledecká	Czech Republic	1:07.69	+2.80
28	43	Ania Monica Caill	Romania	1:10.29	+5.40
29	45	Sarah Schleper	Mexico	1:10.85	+5.96
—	1	Jasmine Flury	Switzerland	Did not finish	
—	9	Tina Weirather	Liechtenstein	Did not finish	
—	14	Stephanie Venier	Austria	Did not finish	
—	16	Lindsey Vonn	United States	Did not finish	
—	21	Laurenne Ross	United States	Did not finish	
—	22	Michaela Wenig	Germany	Did not finish	
—	30	Christina Ager	Austria	Did not finish	
—	32	Meike Pfister	Germany	Did not finish	
—	33	Iulija Pleshkova	Russia	Did not finish	
—	34	Maryna Gąsienica-Daniel	Poland	Did not finish	
—	35	Aleksandra Prokopyeva	Russia	Did not finish	
—	38	Nevena Ignjatović	Serbia	Did not finish	
—	39	Lin Ivarsson	Sweden	Did not finish	
—	40	Helena Rapaport	Sweden	Did not finish	
—	31	Roni Remme	Canada	Did not start	
—	44	Alexandra Coletti	Monaco	Did not start	
