= Julia Pleshkova =

Russian alpine skier (born 1997)

Personal information
- Born: 17 May 1997 (age 29) Yelizovo, Russia

Skiing career
- Sport: Alpine skiing
- Disciplines: Downhill, Super-G, Combined
- World Cup debut: 23 February 2019 (age 21)

Olympics
- Teams: 2 – (2022, 2026)
- Medals: 0

World Championships
- Teams: 2 – (2019, 2021)
- Medals: 0

World Cup
- Seasons: 5 – (2019–2022, 2026)
- Podiums: 0
- Overall titles: 0 – (71st in 2022)
- Discipline titles: 0 – (34th in DH and SG, 2022)

Julia Mikhaylovna Pleshkova (Russian: Юлия Михайловна Плешкова; born 17 May 1997) is a Russian World Cup alpine ski racer from Yelizovo, Russia. She made her World Cup debut on 23 February 2019 in Crans-Montana, Switzerland.

== World Cup results ==
=== Season standings ===
Season
Season	Age	Overall	Slalom	Giant slalom	Super-G	Downhill	Combined
2019	21	127	—	—	47	—	—
2020	22	110	—	—	46	55	39
2021	23	80	—	—	39	36	—N/a
2022	24	71	—	—	34	34	—N/a

== World Championship results ==
Year
Year	Age	Slalom	Giant slalom	Super-G	Downhill	Combined
2019	21	—	—	DNF	31	DNS2
2021	23	—	—	30	27	DNS1

== Olympic results ==
Year
Year	Age	Slalom	Giant slalom	Super-G	Downhill	Combined	Team combined	Team event
2022	24	—	27	18	20	10	—N/a	11
2026	28	—	—	19	22	—N/a	—	—N/a
