= FIS Alpine World Ski Championships 2019 – Women's downhill =

Women's downhill at the FIS Alpine World Ski Championships 2019
- Venue: Åre ski resort
- Location: Åre, Sweden
- Dates: 10 February
- Competitors: 37 from 16 nations
- Winning time: 1:01.74

Medalists
gold medal	Ilka Štuhec	Slovenia
silver medal	Corinne Suter	Switzerland
bronze medal	Lindsey Vonn	United States

Women's Downhill
- Location: Åre, Sweden
- Vertical: 502 m (1,647 ft)
- Top elevation: 898 m (2,946 ft)
- Base elevation: 396 m (1,299 ft)
- Longest run: 1.670 km (1.04 mi)

The Women's downhill competition at the FIS Alpine World Ski Championships 2019 was held on Sunday, 10 February.

In the final event of her international career, Lindsey Vonn of the United States won the bronze medal, a half-second behind repeat champion Ilka Štuhec of Slovenia, and Switzerland's Corinne Suter took the silver.

The race course was 1.670 km (1.04 mi) in length, with a vertical drop of 502 m (1,647 ft) from a starting elevation of 898 m (2,946 ft) above sea level. Štuhec's winning time of 61.74 seconds yielded an average speed of 97.376 km/h (60.5 mph) and an average vertical descent rate of 8.131 m/s (26.7 ft/s).

== Results ==
The race started at 12:30 CET (UTC+1). Due to high winds, the starting point was dropped by 162 m (531 ft) to the location of the Super-G start, shortening the length by 0.566 km (0.35 mi) to 1.67 km (1.04 mi).

Rank	Bib	Name	Country	Time	Diff
1st place, gold medalist(s)	9	Ilka Štuhec	Slovenia	1:01.74	—
2nd place, silver medalist(s)	19	Corinne Suter	Switzerland	1:01.97	+0.23
3rd place, bronze medalist(s)	3	Lindsey Vonn	United States	1:02.23	+0.49
4	7	Stephanie Venier	Austria	1:02.27	+0.53
5	6	Ragnhild Mowinckel	Norway	1:02.33	+0.59
6	8	Nicol Delago	Italy	1:02.36	+0.62
7	13	Ramona Siebenhofer	Austria	1:02.38	+0.64
8	18	Lara Gut-Behrami	Switzerland	1:02.52	+0.78
9	15	Nicole Schmidhofer	Austria	1:02.55	+0.81
9	10	Tamara Tippler	Austria	1:02.55	+0.81
11	1	Viktoria Rebensburg	Germany	1:02.56	+0.82
12	12	Michaela Wenig	Germany	1:02.64	+0.90
13	11	Kira Weidle	Germany	1:02.68	+0.94
14	4	Nadia Fanchini	Italy	1:02.74	+1.00
15	5	Sofia Goggia	Italy	1:02.76	+1.02
16	14	Joana Hählen	Switzerland	1:02.90	+1.16
17	20	Ester Ledecká	Czech Republic	1:02.91	+1.17
18	17	Tina Weirather	Liechtenstein	1:03.00	+1.26
19	29	Kajsa Vickhoff Lie	Norway	1:03.08	+1.34
20	16	Romane Miradoli	France	1:03.10	+1.36
20	2	Jasmine Flury	Switzerland	1:03.10	+1.36
22	21	Alice Merryweather	United States	1:03.26	+1.36
23	27	Meike Pfister	Germany	1:03.30	+1.56
24	25	Lin Ivarsson	Sweden	1:03.40	+1.66
25	24	Lisa Hörnblad	Sweden	1:03.60	+1.86
26	23	Tiffany Gauthier	France	1:03.64	+1.90
27	28	Alexandra Coletti	Monaco	1:03.65	+1.91
28	30	Roni Remme	Canada	1:03.83	+2.09
29	26	Francesca Marsaglia	Italy	1:03.87	+2.13
30	33	Greta Small	Australia	1:03.96	+2.22
31	32	Iulija Pleshkova	Russia	1:03.97	+2.23
32	22	Marie-Michèle Gagnon	Canada	1:04.06	+2.32
33	34	Maruša Ferk	Slovenia	1:04.09	+2.35
34	36	Ida Dannewitz	Sweden	1:04.28	+2.54
35	35	Helena Rapaport	Sweden	1:04.71	+2.97
36	31	Aleksandra Prokopyeva	Russia	1:04.73	+2.99
37	37	Ania Monica Caill	Romania	1:05.53	+3.79
