= Ania Monica Caill =

French-born alpine skier

Personal information
- Born: 24 October 1995 (age 30) Limoges, France
- Height: 1.70 m (5 ft 7 in)
- Weight: 60 kg (132 lb)

Sport
- Country: Romania
- Sport: Alpine skiing

Ania Monica Caill (born 24 October 1995) is a French-born Romanian alpine skier. She represented Romania at the 2014 Winter Olympics in the alpine skiing events.

== Biography ==
Caill originally competed for France, winning the French championships in her age category in 2011. However, she switched to the Romanian team in June 2012 citing a lack of opportunity on the French team that was to compete in Sochi. She is allowed to compete for Romania because it is her mother's home country. At the 2018 Pyeongchang Olympics, Caill planned to compete in the giant slalom. However, due to bad weather, the giant slalom race was postponed and clashed with the training runs of the Super G, which she preferred.

== World Cup results ==
=== Results per discipline ===
Discipline	WC starts	WC Top 30	WC Top 15	WC Top 5	WC Podium	Best result		
Discipline	WC starts	WC Top 30	WC Top 15	WC Top 5	WC Podium	Date	Location	Place
Slalom	0	0	0	0	0			
Giant slalom	2	0	0	0	0	22 December 2013	Val-d'Isère, France	59th
Super-G	11	0	0	0	0	24 January 2021	Crans-Montana, Switzerland	37th
Downhill	15	0	0	0	0	22 February 2020	Crans-Montana, Switzerland	35th
Combined	1	0	0	0	0	18 December 2015	Val-d'Isère, France	33rd
Total	29	0	0	0	0			

- Standings through 25 January 2021

== World Championship results ==
Year
Year	Age	Slalom	Giant; Slalom	Super G	Downhill	Combined	Team Event
2015	19	—	54	—	—	—	—
2017	17	Didn't participate					
2019	23	—	—	28	37	—	—
2021	25			DNS	30		—

== Olympic results ==
Year
Year	Age	Slalom	Giant; Slalom	Super G	Downhill	Combined	Team event
2014	18	—	51	30	DNF	22	—N/a
2018	22	—	DNS	36	28	—	—
