= Lin Ivarsson =

Swedish alpine skier (born 1996)

Personal information
- Born: 8 January 1996 (age 30)

Skiing career
- Sport: Alpine skiing ♀
- Disciplines: Super-G, downhill
- World Cup debut: 16 December 2017 (age 21)

World Championships
- Teams: 2 – (2019–2021)

World Cup
- Seasons: 4 – (2018–2021)
- Overall titles: 0 – (109th in 2020)
- Discipline titles: 0 – (43rd in SG, 2020)

Lin Ivarsson (born 8 January 1996) is a Swedish former alpine ski racer.

== World Cup results ==
=== Season standings ===
Season	Age	Overall	Slalom	Giant Slalom	Super G	Downhill	Combined
2020	24	109	—	—	43	54	—
2021	25	120	—	—	—	44	—

=== Results per discipline ===
Discipline	WC starts	WC Top 30	WC Top 15	WC Top 5	WC Podium	Best result		
Discipline	WC starts	WC Top 30	WC Top 15	WC Top 5	WC Podium	Date	Location	Place
Slalom	0	0	0	0	0			
Giant slalom	0	0	0	0	0			
Super-G	17	1	0	0	0	8 December 2019	Lake Louise, Canada	21st
Downhill	19	2	0	0	0	22 January 2021	Crans-Montana, Switzerland	28th
Combined	2	0	0	0	0	4 March 2018	Crans-Montana, Switzerland	DNS2
Total	38	3	0	0	0			

- Standings through 21 March 2021

== World Championship results ==
Year
Year	Age	Slalom	Giant; Slalom	Super G	Downhill	Combined	Team Event
2019	23	—	—	DNF	24	DNS2	—
2021	25	—	—	35	29	—	—

== Other results ==
=== European Cup results ===
==== Season standings ====
Season	Age	Overall	Slalom	Giant slalom	Super-G	Downhill	Combined
2017	21	143	—	—	—	53	—
2018	22	49	—	—	57	10	—
2019	23	63	—	—	27	17	—
2020	24	76	—	—	44	25	—
2021	25	118	—	—	—	27	—

==== Results per discipline ====
Discipline	EC starts	EC Top 30	EC Top 15	EC Top 5	EC Podium	Best result		
Discipline	EC starts	EC Top 30	EC Top 15	EC Top 5	EC Podium	Date	Location	Place
Slalom	0	0	0	0	0			
Giant slalom	1	0	0	0	0	8 December 2018	Kvitfjell, Norway	DNF2
Super-G	13	5	2	0	0	20 December 2018	Zauchensee, Austria	10th
Downhill	17	15	8	2	1	27 February 2018	Crans-Montana, Switzerland	3rd
Combined	4	0	0	0	0	7 December 2018	Kvitfjell, Norway	32rd
Total	35	20	10	2	1			

- Standings through 21 March 2021

==== Race podiums ====
- 1 podiums – (1 DH)

Season
Season	Date	Location	Discipline	Place
2018	27 February 2018	Crans-Montana, Switzerland	Downhill	3rd
