= Meike Pfister =

German alpine skier

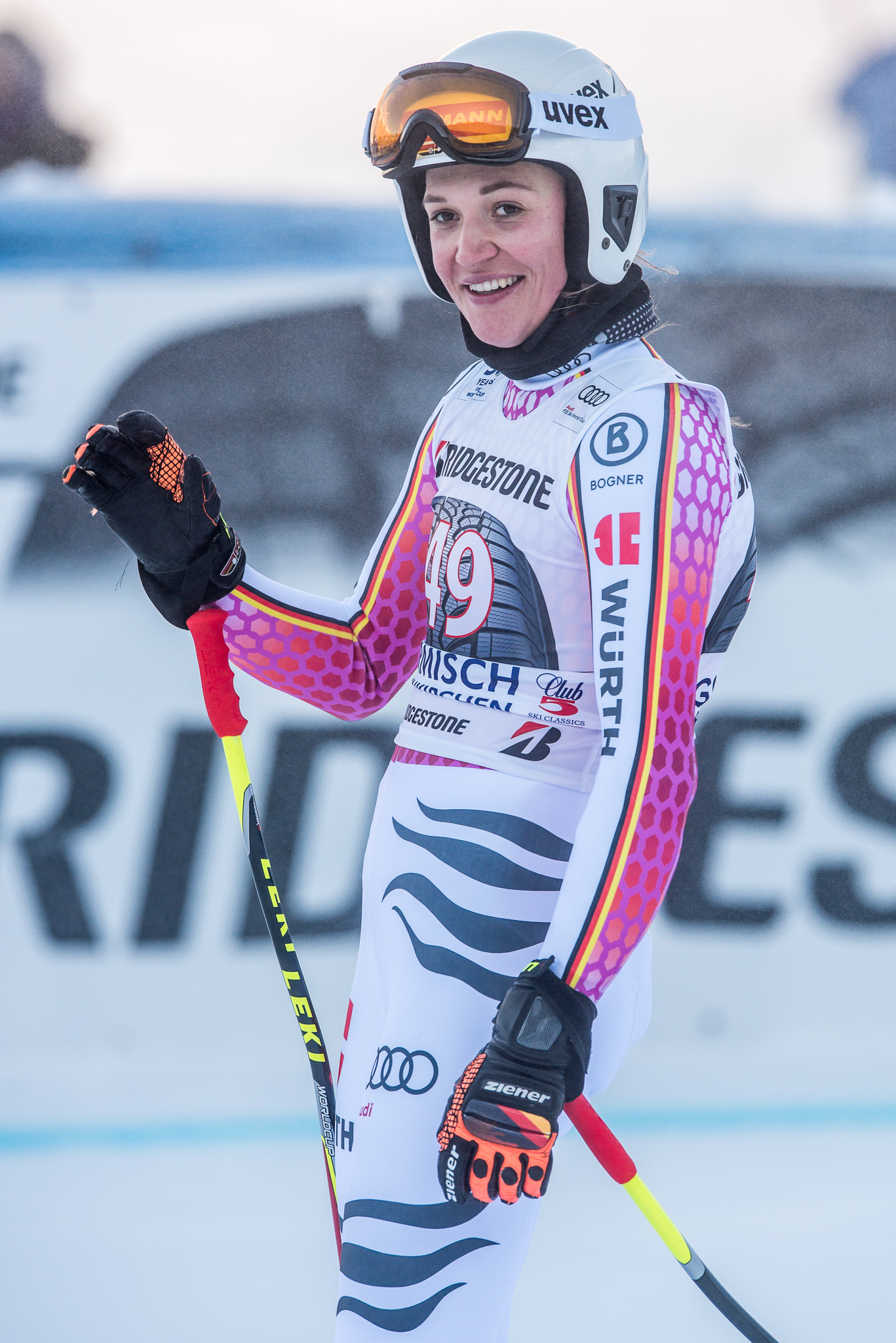
- At Garmisch-Partenkirchen in 2017

Personal information
- Born: 6 February 1996 (age 30)
- Height: 1.80 m (5 ft 11 in)

Skiing career
- Sport: Alpine skiing
- Club: SC Krumbach
- Disciplines: Super-G, Downhill
- World Cup debut: 21 January 2017 (age 20)

Olympics
- Teams: 0

World Championships
- Teams: 1 − (2019)
- Medals: 0

World Cup
- Seasons: 2 − (2018, 2019)
- Podiums: 0
- Overall titles: 0 – (92nd in 2018)
- Discipline titles: 0 – (37th in DH, 2018)

Meike Pfister (born 6 February 1996) is a German former World Cup alpine ski racer, who specialized in Super-G.

She competed at the World Championships in 2019.

== World Cup results ==
=== Season standings ===
| Season | Age | Overall | Slalom | Giant slalom | Super-G | Downhill | Combined |
|---|---|---|---|---|---|---|---|
| 2018 | 22 | 92 | — | — | 45 | 37 | — |
| 2019 | 23 | 110 | — | — | 47 | 42 | — |

Standings through 3 February 2019

=== Top twenty finishes ===
- 0 podiums

| Season | Date | Location | Discipline | Place |
|---|---|---|---|---|
| 2018 | 4 Feb 2018 | Garmisch, Germany | Downhill | 14th |
| 2018 | 3 Mar 2018 | Crans-Montana, Switzerland | Super-G | 19th |

== World Championship results ==
| Year | Age | Slalom | Giant slalom | Super-G | Downhill | Combined |
|---|---|---|---|---|---|---|
| 2019 | 23 | — | — | DNF | 23 | 22 |
