= Ramona Siebenhofer =

Austrian alpine skier

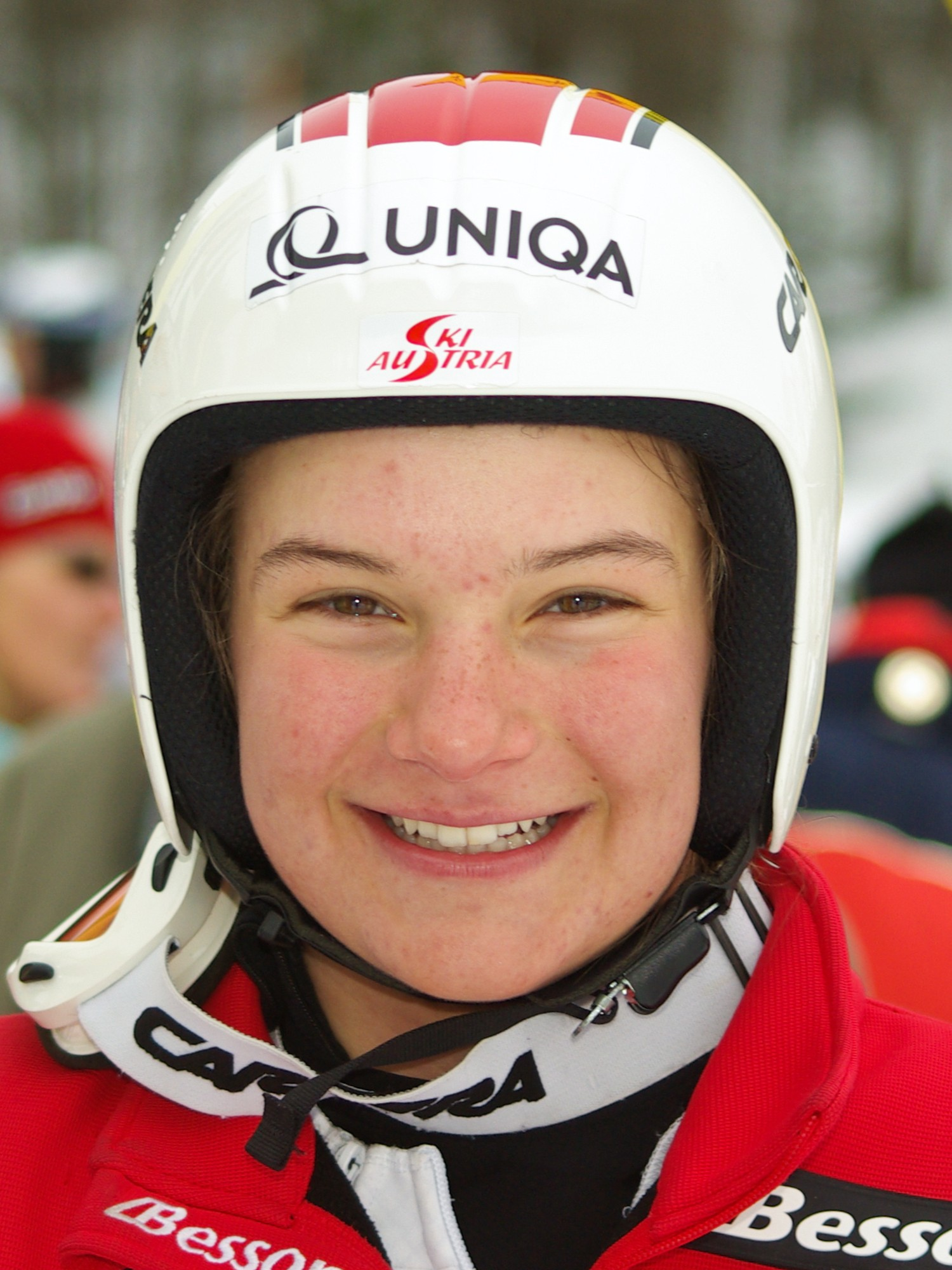
- Siebenhofer in March 2009

Personal information
- Born: 29 July 1991 (age 34) Tamsweg, Salzburg, Austria
- Height: 1.70 m (5 ft 7 in)
- Website: ramonasiebenhofer.com

Skiing career
- Sport: Alpine skiing
- Club: USV Krakauebene - Steiermark
- Disciplines: Downhill, super-G, giant slalom, combined
- World Cup debut: 28 December 2009 (age 18)

Olympics
- Teams: 2 – (2018, 2022)
- Medals: 0

World Championships
- Teams: 4 – (2017–2023)
- Medals: 0

World Cup
- Seasons: 13 – (2010, 2012–2023)
- Wins: 2 – (2 DH)
- Podiums: 7 – (7 DH)
- Overall titles: 0 – (12th in 2022)
- Discipline titles: 0 – (3rd in DH, 2019)

Ramona Siebenhofer (born 29 July 1991) is a World Cup alpine ski racer from Austria.

Born in Tamsweg, Salzburg, Siebenhofer made her World Cup debut in December 2009 in Lienz, Austria. She attained her first World Cup podium in December 2015, a third place in downhill at Lake Louise, Canada.

== World Cup results ==
=== Season standings ===
Season	Age	Overall	Slalom	Giant slalom	Super-G	Downhill	Combined
2010	18	90	—	30	—	—	—
2011	19	0 points					
2012	20	0 points					
2013	21	0 points					
2014	22	62	—	39	46	37	7
2015	23	70	—	40	42	37	13
2016	24	47	—	38	32	18	34
2017	25	39	—	—	31	17	13
2018	26	29	—	—	21	19	6
2019	27	15	—	—	19	3	17
2020	28	27	—	31	31	22	5
2021	29	15	—	12	48	10	—N/a
2022	30	12	—	14	16	4	—N/a
2023	31	26	—	24	12	25	—N/a

Standings through 5 February 2023

=== Race podiums ===
- 2 wins – (2 DH)
- 7 podiums – (7 DH); 36 top tens

Season	Date	Location	Discipline	Place
2016	4 Dec 2015	Lake Louise, Canada	Downhill	3rd
2019	18 Dec 2018	Val Gardena, Italy	Downhill	3rd
2019	18 Jan 2019	Cortina d'Ampezzo, Italy	Downhill	1st
2019	19 Jan 2019	Cortina d'Ampezzo, Italy	Downhill	1st
2021	26 Feb 2021	Val di Fassa, Italy	Downhill	2nd
2022	15 Jan 2022	Zauchensee, Austria	Downhill	3rd
2022	22 Jan 2022	Cortina d'Ampezzo, Italy	Downhill	2nd

== World Championship results ==
Year	Age	Slalom	Giant slalom	Super-G	Downhill	Combined
2017	25	—	—	—	9	—
2019	27	—	—	15	7	4
2021	29	—	5	—	5	5
2023	31	—	—	17		4

== Olympic results ==
Year	Age	Slalom	Giant slalom	Super-G	Downhill	Combined
2018	26	—	—	—	10	7
2022	30	—	DNF2	—	12	7
