= Michaela Wenig =

German alpine skier (born 1992)

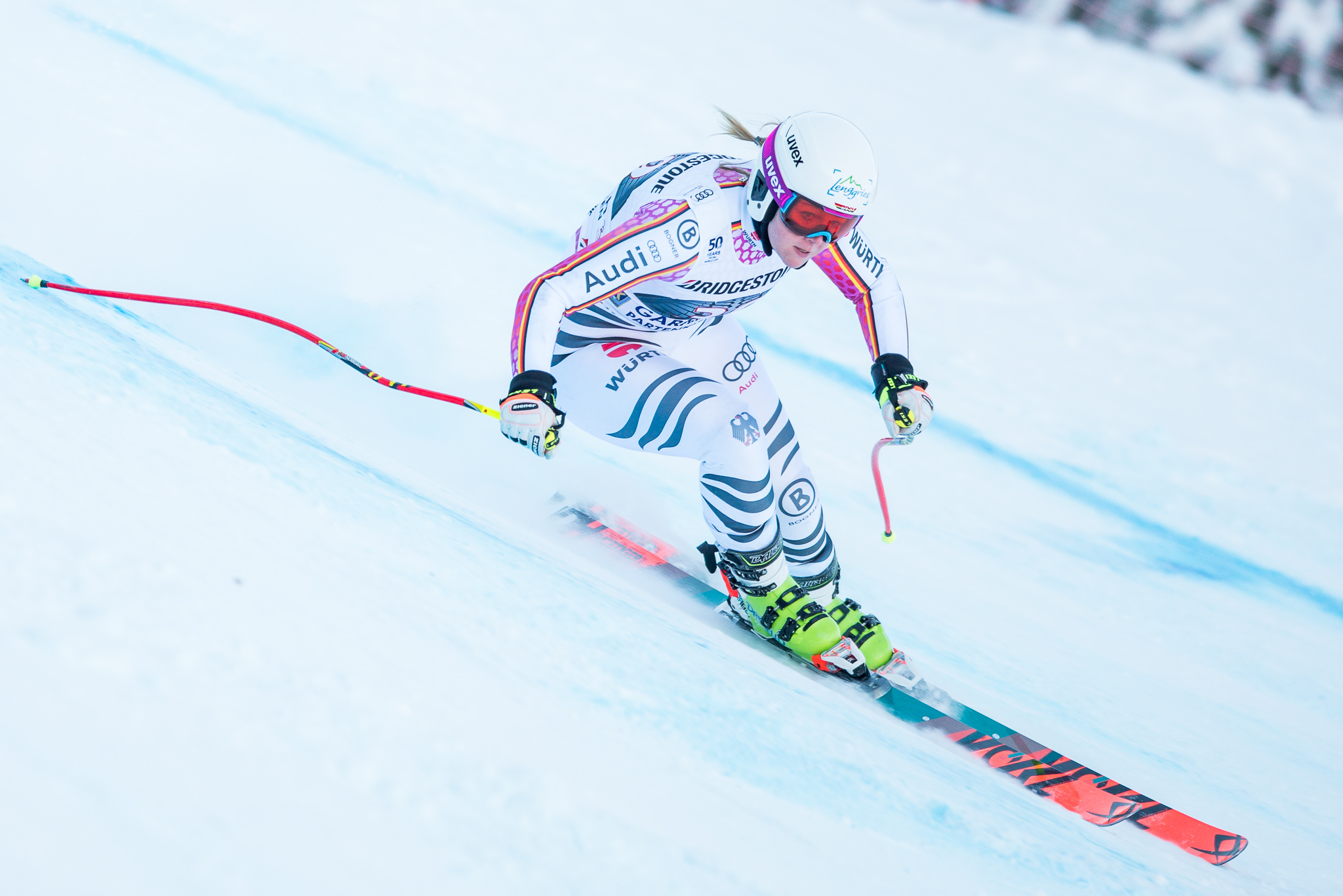
- At Garmisch-Partenkirchen in 2017

Personal information
- Born: 14 June 1992 (age 34) Bad Tölz, Bavaria, Germany
- Height: 1.76 m (5 ft 9 in)
- Website: michaela-wenig.de

Skiing career
- Sport: Alpine skiing
- Club: Skiclub Lenggries eV
- Retired: 6 April 2021 (age 28)
- Disciplines: Super-G, Downhill
- World Cup debut: 30 November 2012 (age 20)

Olympics
- Teams: 0

World Championships
- Teams: 1 − (2019)
- Medals: 0

World Cup
- Seasons: 5 − (2014, 2015, 2017–19)
- Podiums: 0
- Overall titles: 0 – (77th in 2018)
- Discipline titles: 0 – (34th in DH, 2018)

Michaela Wenig (born 14 June 1992) is a German former World Cup alpine ski racer, specializing in Super-G.

She competed at the World Championships in 2019.

== World Cup results ==
=== Season standings ===
Season	Age	Overall	Slalom	Giant slalom	Super-G	Downhill	Combined
2014	21	118	—	—	—	51	—
2015	22	104	—	—	51	43	—
2016	23	injured in December, no points					
2017	24	98	—	—	—	40	—
2018	25	77	—	—	37	34	41
2019	26	59	—	—	43	22	—

Standings through 3 February 2019

=== Top ten finishes ===
- 0 podiums
- 1 top ten

Season	Date	Location	Discipline	Place
2019	18 Dec 2018	Val Gardena, Italy	Downhill	5th

== World Championship results ==
Year	Age	Slalom	Giant slalom	Super-G	Downhill	Combined
2019	26	—	—	DNF	12	—
