= Ilka Štuhec =

Slovenian alpine skier (born 1990)

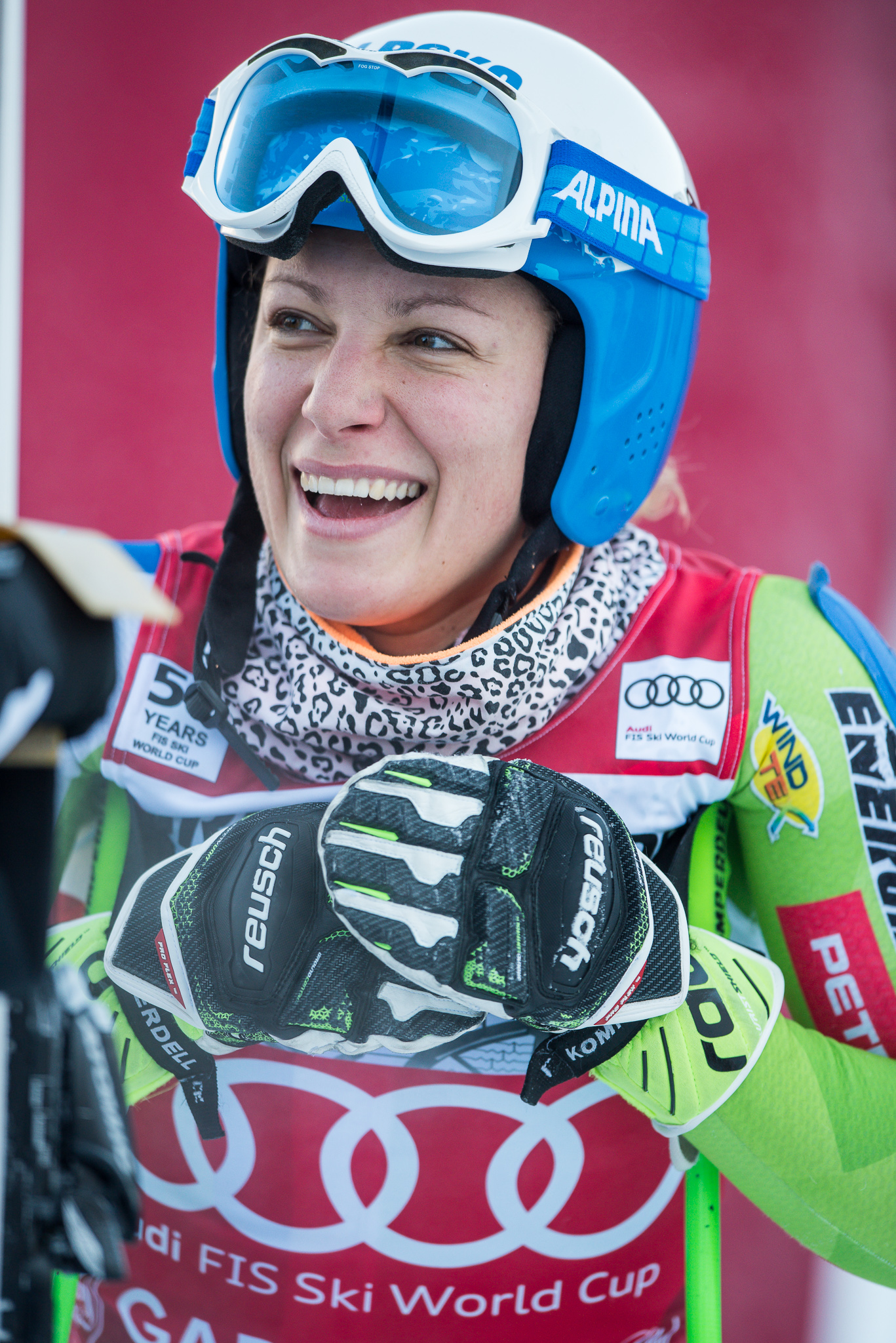
- Štuhec at Garmisch in 2017

Personal information
- Born: 26 October 1990 (age 35) Slovenj Gradec, SFR Yugoslavia

Skiing career
- Sport: Alpine skiing
- Retired: 22 March 2026 (aged 35)
- Disciplines: Downhill, super-G
- World Cup debut: 17 March 2007 (aged 16)

Olympics
- Teams: 3 – (2014, 2022, 2026)
- Medals: 0

World Championships
- Teams: 7 – (2013–2025)
- Medals: 2 (2 gold)

World Cup
- Seasons: 17 – (2007–2008, 2010, 2012–2017, 2019–2026)
- Wins: 11 – (7 DH, 3 SG, 1 AC)
- Podiums: 22 – (14 DH, 5 SG, 3 AC)
- Overall titles: 0 – (2nd in 2017)
- Discipline titles: 2 – (DH, AC in 2017)
Medal record
Women's alpine skiing
Representing Slovenia
International alpine ski competitions
Event	1st	2nd	3rd
Olympic Games	0	0	0
World Championships	2	0	0
Total	2	0	0
World Championships
Gold medal – first place	2017 St. Moritz	Downhill
Gold medal – first place	2019 Åre	Downhill
Junior World Championships
Gold medal – first place	2007 Flachau	Slalom
Gold medal – first place	2007 Flachau	Combined
Gold medal – first place	2008 Formigal	Downhill

Ilka Štuhec (born 26 October 1990) is a Slovenian former alpine ski racer who competed in downhill and super-G events of the Alpine Ski World Cup. She was a three-time junior world champion in three different disciplines, and was the world champion in downhill in 2017 and 2019.

== Career ==
At the 2007 World Junior Alpine Skiing Championships in Flachau, Austria, Štuhec won two gold medals in slalom and combined. The following year, she won another gold in downhill in Formigal, Spain. She made her World Cup debut in March 2007 at the age of 16 in Lenzerheide, Switzerland.

Štuhec gained her first World Cup victories in December 2016, back-to-back wins in downhill at Lake Louise. She had consecutive wins two weeks later in Val d'Isère, France, and won her fifth event of the 2017 season in late January in Italy. At the 2017 World Championships in February, she won the gold medal in downhill, and clinched the World Cup season title in combined two weeks later. At the finals in mid-March she secured another title in downhill, and was the runner-up for the season in super-G and overall.

Štuhec was sidelined for the entire 2017–18 season, including the 2018 Winter Olympics in South Korea, due to a left knee injury (ACL) in October 2017. She returned to the winner's circle with consecutive World Cup victories in Val Gardena in December 2018, and successfully defended her World Championships title in downhill in February 2019. Two weeks later, a crash at Crans-Montana injured the same knee (PCL); it was reported that she would recover without surgery.

Štuhec retired from competitive skiing after the 2025–26 season.

== World Cup results ==
=== Season titles ===
- 2 titles – (1 combined, 1 downhill)

Season	Discipline
2017	Combined
2017	Downhill

=== Season standings ===
Season	Overall	Slalom	Giant slalom	Super-G	Downhill	Combined
2008	89	—	—	—	44	26
2012	81	—	—	—	27	—
2013	59	—	—	36	25	15
2014	44	—	47	17	28	—
2015	41	—	—	28	22	—
2016	33	—	—	12	25	29
2017	2	35	34	2	1	1
2018	Injured in October, out for the season					
2019	10	—	46	11	4	—
2020	32	—	—	28	15	—
2021	42	—	—	40	14	—N/a
2022	53	—	—	—	21	—N/a
2023	11	—	—	30	2	—N/a
2024	29	—	—	26	8	—N/a
2025	42	—	—	24	12	—N/a
2026	32	—	—	22	15	—N/a

=== Race victories ===
- 11 wins – (7 DH, 3 SG, 1 AC)

Season	Date	Location	Discipline
2017	2 December 2016	Lake Louise, Canada	Downhill
2017	3 December 2016	Lake Louise, Canada	Downhill
2017	16 December 2016	Val d'Isère, France	Combined
2017	17 December 2016	Val d'Isère, France	Downhill
2017	29 January 2017	Cortina d'Ampezzo, Italy	Super-G
2017	25 February 2017	Crans-Montana, Switzerland	Super-G
2017	15 March 2017	Aspen, United States	Downhill
2019	18 December 2018	Val Gardena, Italy	Downhill
2019	19 December 2018	Val Gardena, Italy	Super-G
2023	21 January 2023	Cortina d'Ampezzo, Italy	Downhill
2023	15 March 2023	Soldeu, Andorra	Downhill

== World Championships results ==
Year	Slalom	Giant slalom	Super-G	Downhill	Combined	Team combined
2013	—	32	6	19	DNF2	Not held
2015	—	25	17	20	7	Not held
2017	—	DNF2	11	1	DNF2	Not held
2019	—	—	8	1	10	Not held
2021	—	—	25	14	—	Not held
2023	—	—	12	6	DNS2	Not held
2025	—	—	22	11	Not held	9

== Winter Olympic Games results ==
Year	Slalom	Giant slalom	Super-G	Downhill	Combined	Team combined
2014	—	31	13	10	DNF2	Not held
2022	—	—	—	22	—	Not held
2026	—	—	DNF	15	Not held	DNF

Olympic Games
Preceded by Vesna Fabjan	Flagbearer for Slovenia; Beijing 2022	Succeeded by Nika Prevc and Domen Prevc
