= FIS Alpine World Ski Championships 2019 – Women's alpine combined =

Women's alpine combined at the FIS Alpine World Ski Championships 2019
- Venue: Åre ski resort
- Location: Åre, Sweden
- Dates: 8 February
- Competitors: 35 from 18 nations
- Winning time: 2:02.13

Medalists
gold medal	Wendy Holdener	Switzerland
silver medal	Petra Vlhová	Slovakia
bronze medal	Ragnhild Mowinckel	Norway

The Women's alpine combined competition at the FIS Alpine World Ski Championships 2019 was held on 8 February 2019.

== Results ==
The downhill competition was started at 11:30 and the slalom run at 16:15.

Rank	Bib	Name	Country	Downhill	Rank	Slalom	Rank	Total	Diff
1st place, gold medalist(s)	15	Wendy Holdener	Switzerland	1:13.13	5	49.00	3	2:02.13	
2nd place, silver medalist(s)	11	Petra Vlhová	Slovakia	1:13.43	8	48.73	2	2:02.16	+0.03
3rd place, bronze medalist(s)	7	Ragnhild Mowinckel	Norway	1:12.77	3	49.81	6	2:02.58	+0.45
4	19	Ramona Siebenhofer	Austria	1:12.71	1	49.91	8	2:02.62	+0.49
5	28	Roni Remme	Canada	1:14.68	28	48.58	1	2:03.26	+1.13
6	13	Federica Brignone	Italy	1:13.31	6	50.21	10	2:03.52	+1.39
7	18	Kajsa Vickhoff Lie	Norway	1:13.87	15	49.77	5	2:03.64	+1.51
8	24	Franziska Gritsch	Austria	1:14.80	29	49.02	4	2:03.82	+1.69
9	6	Lisa Hörnblad	Sweden	1:13.59	11	50.60	13	2:04.19	+2.06
10	9	Ilka Štuhec	Slovenia	1:12.72	2	51.55	17	2:04.27	+2.14
11	20	Anne-Sophie Barthet	France	1:14.52	26	49.86	7	2:04.38	+2.25
12	10	Nicol Delago	Italy	1:13.59	11	51.10	14	2:04.69	+2.56
13	17	Marta Bassino	Italy	1:14.30	21	50.44	12	2:04.74	+2.61
14	3	Marie-Michèle Gagnon	Canada	1:14.49	25	50.26	11	2:04.75	+2.62
15	30	Ester Ledecká	Czech Republic	1:13.85	14	51.18	15	2:05.03	+2.90
16	16	Maruša Ferk	Slovenia	1:15.13	30	49.96	9	2:05.09	+2.96
17	4	Christina Ager	Austria	1:14.02	16	52.30	19	2:06.32	+4.19
18	14	Alice Merryweather	United States	1:13.53	10	53.10	21	2:06.63	+4.50
19	5	Nevena Ignjatović	Serbia	1:15.55	33	51.19	16	2:06.74	+4.61
20	32	Greta Small	Australia	1:14.30	21	52.56	20	2:06.86	+4.73
21	22	Maryna Gąsienica-Daniel	Poland	1:15.29	32	51.74	18	2:07.03	+4.90
22	26	Meike Pfister	Germany	1:14.22	19	53.66	24	2:07.88	+5.75
23	25	Aleksandra Prokopyeva	Russia	1:14.53	27	53.40	23	2:07.93	+5.80
24	12	Kateřina Pauláthová	Czech Republic	1:15.14	31	53.22	22	2:08.36	+6.23
—	8	Ricarda Haaser	Austria	1:13.32	7	Did not finish			
—	34	Alexandra Coletti	Monaco	1:14.33	23	Did not finish			
—	35	Jasmine Flury	Switzerland	1:14.09	17	Did not start			
—	33	Joana Hählen	Switzerland	1:14.26	20	Did not start			
—	31	Lin Ivarsson	Sweden	1:14.21	18	Did not start			
—	29	Iulija Pleshkova	Russia	1:16.04	34	Did not start			
—	23	Corinne Suter	Switzerland	1:13.05	4	Did not start			
—	21	Tina Weirather	Liechtenstein	1:13.69	13	Did not start			
—	2	Lara Gut-Behrami	Switzerland	1:14.34	24	Did not start			
—	1	Lindsey Vonn	United States	1:13.43	8	Did not start			
—	27	Ida Dannewitz	Sweden	Did not finish					
