= 2020–21 FIS Alpine Ski World Cup =

International sports competition

Discipline	Men	Women
Overall	(France) Alexis Pinturault (1)	(Slovakia) Petra Vlhová (1)
Downhill	(Switzerland) Beat Feuz (4)	(Italy) Sofia Goggia (2)
Super-G	(Austria) Vincent Kriechmayr (1)	(Switzerland) Lara Gut-Behrami (3)
Giant slalom	(France) Alexis Pinturault (1)	(Italy) Marta Bassino (1)
Slalom	(Austria) Marco Schwarz (1)	(Austria) Katharina Liensberger (1)
Parallel	(France) Alexis Pinturault (1)	(Slovakia) Petra Vlhová (2)
Nations Cup	Switzerland (7)	Switzerland (10)
- Nations Cup Overall: Switzerland (9)

Competition
Locations	19 venues	17 venues
Individual	35 events	31 events
Mixed	1 event	1 event
Cancelled	12 events	5 events
Rescheduled	9 events	2 events

Overall champions

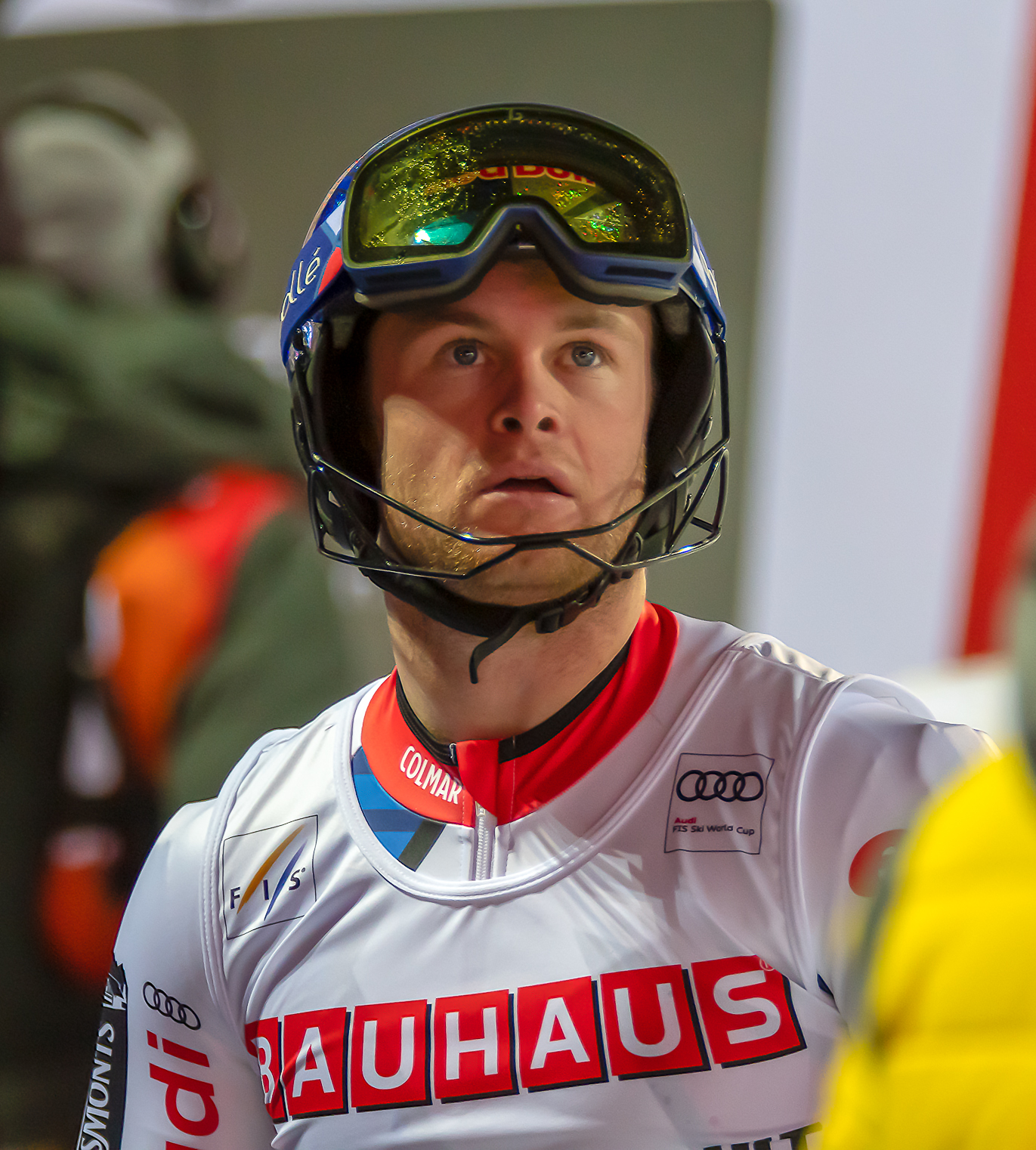
Alexis Pinturault became the first French skier to win an overall World Cup title since Luc Alphand in 1996–97.

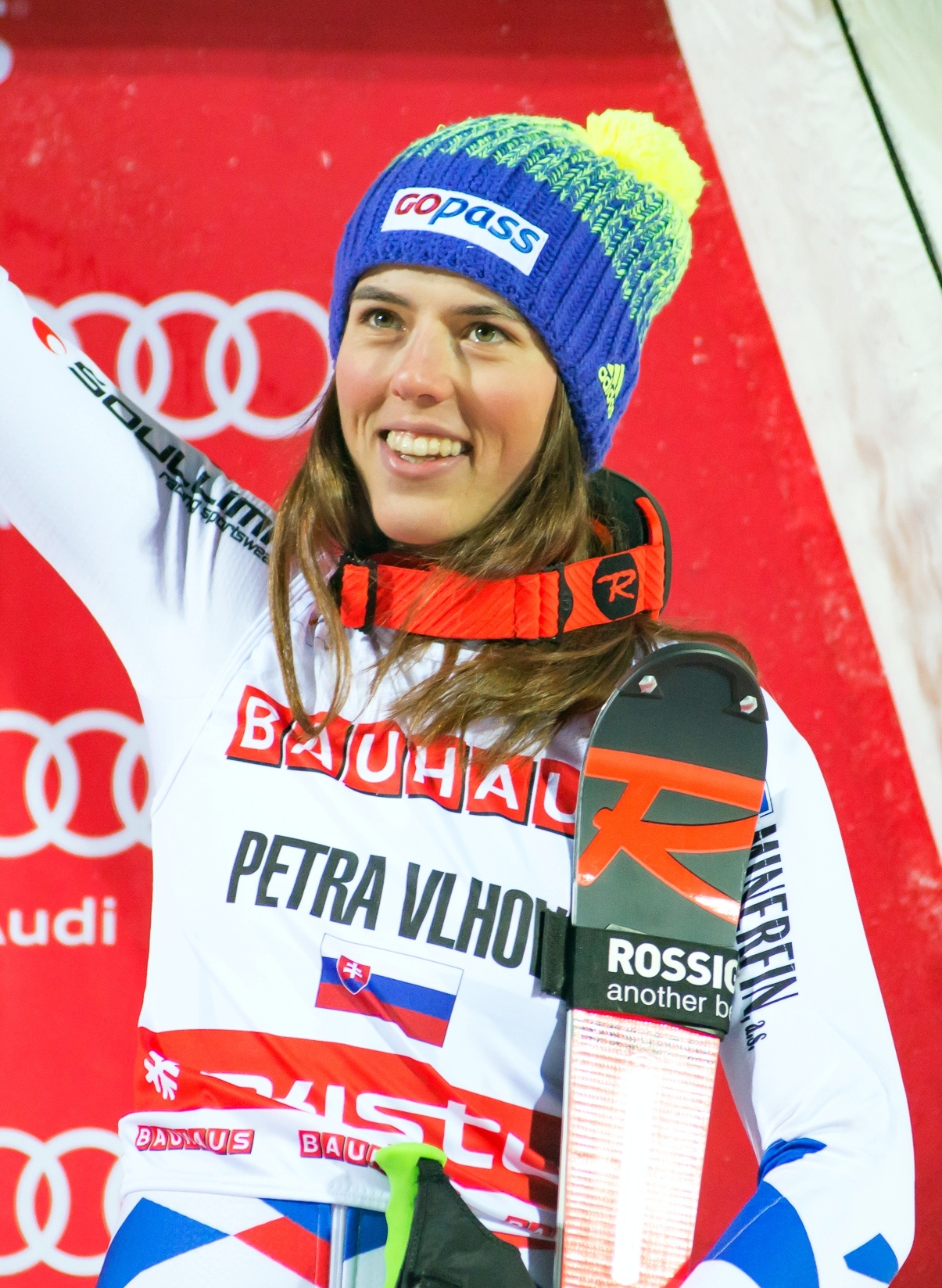
Petra Vlhová became the first Slovak skier to win an overall World Cup title in history.

The International Ski Federation (FIS) Alpine Ski World Cup was the premier circuit for alpine skiing competition. The inaugural season launched in January 1967, and the 2020–21 season marked the 55th consecutive year for the FIS World Cup. As it had every year since 2006 (when the Sölden races were cancelled due to a snowstorm), the season began in Sölden, Austria in October, and it ended with the World Cup finals in March, which were held in Lenzerheide, Switzerland. However, the COVID-19 pandemic forced many changes to the original racing schedule. Among them were the following:

Canceled events: Val d'Isere (AC); St. Anton (AC); Crans-Montana (AC); Levi (Men); Lech (Team); Lake Louise (3 DH, 2 SG); Alta Badia (P); Davos (P), Beaver Creek (DH, SG, GS); Chamonix (DH, P); Bansko (AC); Bormio (AC); Wengen (DH, SL, AC); Maribor (SL) and Åre (GS).

Ladies' calendar changes: Killington to Levi (SL); Killington to Courchevel (GS); Lake Louise to Val d'Isere (DH); Lake Louise to St. Moritz (SG); Åre to Maribor (GS); Maribor to Åre (SL) and Lake Louise to Crans-Montana (DH).

Men's calendar changes: Beaver Creek to Val d'Isere (GS, SG, DH); Val d'Isere to Alta Badia (SL): Garmisch to Adelboden (GS): Lake Louise to Wengen (DH); Lake Louise to Ga-Pa (SG) and Levi to Chamonix (SL).

Additional events: Chamonix (SL); Bansko (GS); Bormio (SG), St. Anton (SG) and Val d'Isere (Ladies' SG).

Further changes due to the pandemic were considered likely and are shown on the schedule below. However, two results of these COVID-related changes were that (1) no Alpine combined events were held during the season, despite the increased emphasis placed on such events beginning with the prior season, and (2) no World Cup races were held in North America for the first time since the 1973-74 season and only the second time in World Cup history.

== Men ==
The number of races in World Cup history

Total	DH	SG	GS	SL	AC	PS	PG	CE	K.O.	Winners
1817	503	223	429	508	134	2	7	10	1	297

after SL in Lenzerheide (21 March 2021)

=== Calendar ===
Event key: DH – Downhill, SL – Slalom, GS – Giant slalom, SG – Super giant slalom, PS – Parallel slalom, PG – Parallel giant slalom
All	No.	Date	Venue (slope %)	Type	Winner	Second	Third	R.
1783	1	18 October 2020	(Austria) Sölden	GS _{420}	(Norway) Lucas Braathen	(Switzerland) Marco Odermatt	(Switzerland) Gino Caviezel	
1784	2	(Note: Men's PG scheduled on 14 November 2020 in Lech/Zürs was rescheduled on 27 November 2020 due to lack of snow)27 November 2020	(Austria) Lech/Zürs	PG _{007}	(France) Alexis Pinturault	(Norway) Henrik Kristoffersen	(Germany) Alexander Schmid	
		(Note: GS scheduled on 6 December 2020 in Beaver Creek was moved to Val-d'Isère on 5 December 2020)5 December 2020	(France) Val-d'Isère	GS _{cnx}	cancelled due to lack of snow (moved to Santa Caterina on 5 and 7 December)			
		6 December 2020	(France) Val-d'Isère	GS _{cnx}	cancelled due to lack of snow (moved to Santa Caterina on 5 and 7 December)			
1785	3	(Note: GS scheduled on 5 December in Val-d'Isère is rescheduled to Santa Caterina due to lack of snow)5 December 2020	(Italy) Santa Caterina	GS _{421}	(Croatia) Filip Zubčić	(Slovenia) Žan Kranjec	(Switzerland) Marco Odermatt	
1786	4	(Note: GS scheduled on 6 December in Val-d'Isère is rescheduled to Santa Caterina on 7 December due to lack of snow)7 December 2020	(Italy) Santa Caterina	GS _{422}	(Switzerland) Marco Odermatt	(United States) Tommy Ford	(Croatia) Filip Zubčić	
1787	5	(Note: SG scheduled on 4 December 2020 in Beaver Creek was moved to Val-d'Isère on 12 December 2020)12 December 2020	(France) Val-d'Isère	SG _{218}	(Switzerland) Mauro Caviezel	(Norway) Adrian Smiseth Sejersted	(Austria) Christian Walder	
1788	6	(Note: DH scheduled on 5 December 2020 in Beaver Creek was moved to Val-d'Isère on 13 December 2020)13 December 2020	(France) Val-d'Isère	DH _{497}	(Slovenia) Martin Čater	(Austria) Otmar Striedinger	(Switzerland) Urs Kryenbühl	
1789	7	18 December 2020	(Italy) Val Gardena/Gröden	SG _{219}	(Norway) Aleksander Aamodt Kilde	(Switzerland) Mauro Caviezel	(Norway) Kjetil Jansrud	
1790	8	19 December 2020	(Italy) Val Gardena/Gröden	DH _{498}	(Norway) Aleksander Aamodt Kilde	(United States) Ryan Cochran-Siegle	(Switzerland) Beat Feuz	
1791	9	20 December 2020	(Italy) Alta Badia	GS _{423}	(France) Alexis Pinturault	(Norway) Atle Lie McGrath	(Switzerland) Justin Murisier	
1792	10	(Note: SL scheduled for Val d'Isere was moved to Alta Badia on 21 December 2020)21 December 2020	(Italy) Alta Badia	SL _{498}	(Switzerland) Ramon Zenhäusern	(Austria) Manuel Feller	(Austria) Marco Schwarz	
1793	11	22 December 2020	(Italy) Madonna di Campiglio	SL _{499}	(Norway) Henrik Kristoffersen	(Norway) Sebastian Foss-Solevåg	(Italy) Alex Vinatzer	
1794	12	(Note: Men's SG in Bormio originally scheduled on 29 December 2020 was moved to 28 December due to bad weather forecast, but canceled due to weather conditions. Again rescheduled on original date.)29 December 2020	(Italy) Bormio	SG _{220}	(United States) Ryan Cochran-Siegle	(Austria) Vincent Kriechmayr	(Norway) Adrian Smiseth Sejersted	
1795	13	(Note: Men's DH in Bormio originally scheduled on 28 December 2020 was moved to 29 December due to bad weather forecast, butn rescheduled again on 30 December due to SG.)30 December 2020	(Italy) Bormio	DH _{499}	(Austria) Matthias Mayer	(Austria) Vincent Kriechmayr	(Switzerland) Urs Kryenbühl	
1796	14	6 January 2021	(Croatia) Zagreb	SL _{500}	(Germany) Linus Straßer	(Austria) Manuel Feller	(Austria) Marco Schwarz	
1797	15	(Note: GS scheduled in February 2021 to Garmisch-Partenkirchen was moved to Adelboden on 8 January 2021)8 January 2021	(Switzerland) Adelboden	GS _{424}	(France) Alexis Pinturault	(Croatia) Filip Zubčić	(Switzerland) Marco Odermatt	
1798	16	9 January 2021	(Switzerland) Adelboden	GS _{425}	(France) Alexis Pinturault	(Croatia) Filip Zubčić	(Switzerland) Loïc Meillard	
1799	17	10 January 2021	(Switzerland) Adelboden	SL _{501}	(Austria) Marco Schwarz	(Germany) Linus Straßer	(United Kingdom) Dave Ryding	
		(Note: DH scheduled on 28 November 2020 in Lake Louise was moved to Wengen on 15 January 2021)15 January 2021	(Switzerland) Wengen	DH _{cnx}	cancelled due to the COVID-19 pandemic (1st DH and SL moved to Kitzbühel) (2nd DH moved to Saalbach-Hinterglemm on 5 March)			
		16 January 2021	(Switzerland) Wengen	DH _{cnx}	cancelled due to the COVID-19 pandemic (1st DH and SL moved to Kitzbühel) (2nd DH moved to Saalbach-Hinterglemm on 5 March)			
		17 January 2021	(Switzerland) Wengen	SL _{cnx}	cancelled due to the COVID-19 pandemic (1st DH and SL moved to Kitzbühel) (2nd DH moved to Saalbach-Hinterglemm on 5 March)			
		16 January 2021	(Austria) Kitzbühel	SL _{cnx}	cancelled due to the COVID-19 pandemic (both moved to Flachau on same dates)			
		17 January 2021	(Austria) Kitzbühel	SL _{cnx}	cancelled due to the COVID-19 pandemic (both moved to Flachau on same dates)			
1800	18	(Note: SL scheduled on 17 January 2021 in Wengen was moved to Kitzbühel on 16 January 2021)16 January 2021	(Austria) Flachau	SL _{502}	(Austria) Manuel Feller	(France) Clément Noël	(Austria) Marco Schwarz	
1801	19	(Note: SL scheduled on 24 January 2021 in Kitzbühel was moved to Flachau on 17 January 2021)17 January 2021	(Austria) Flachau	SL _{503}	(Norway) Sebastian Foss-Solevåg	(Austria) Marco Schwarz	(France) Alexis Pinturault	
1802	20	(Note: DH scheduled on 17 January 2021 in Wengen was moved to Kitzbühel on 22 January 2021)22 January 2021	(Austria) Kitzbühel	DH _{500}	(Switzerland) Beat Feuz	(Austria) Matthias Mayer	(Italy) Dominik Paris	
1803	21	(Note: DH scheduled on 23 January 2021 in Kitzbühel was moved to 24 January 2021 due to weather conditions.)24 January 2021	(Austria) Kitzbühel	DH _{501}	(Switzerland) Beat Feuz	(France) Johan Clarey	(Austria) Matthias Mayer	
1804	22	(Note: SG scheduled on 24 January 2021 in Kitzbühel was moved to 25 January 2021 due to DH crossings.)25 January 2021	(Austria) Kitzbühel	SG _{221}	(Austria) Vincent Kriechmayr	(Switzerland) Marco Odermatt	(Austria) Matthias Mayer	
1805	23	26 January 2021	(Austria) Schladming	SL _{504}	(Austria) Marco Schwarz	(France) Clément Noël	(France) Alexis Pinturault	
1806	24	(Note: SL scheduled in November 2020 to Levi was moved to Chamonix on 30 January 2021)30 January 2021	(France) Chamonix	SL _{505}	(France) Clément Noël	(Switzerland) Ramon Zenhäusern	(Austria) Marco Schwarz	
1807	25	31 January 2021	(France) Chamonix	SL _{506}	(Norway) Henrik Kristoffersen	(Switzerland) Ramon Zenhäusern	(Switzerland) Sandro Simonet	
1808	26	(Note: DH scheduled on 29 November 2020 in Lake Louise was moved to Garmisch-Partenkirchen on 6th and finally on 5 February 2021)5 February 2021	(Germany) Garmisch-Partenkirchen	DH _{502}	(Italy) Dominik Paris	(Switzerland) Beat Feuz	(Austria) Matthias Mayer	
1809	27	(Note: SG scheduled on 5 February 2021 in Garmisch-Partenkirchen was moved to 6 February 2021)6 February 2021	(Germany) Garmisch-Partenkirchen	SG _{222}	(Austria) Vincent Kriechmayr	(Austria) Matthias Mayer	(Switzerland) Marco Odermatt	
World Championships (8–21 February)
1810	28	27 February 2021	(Bulgaria) Bansko	GS _{426}	(Croatia) Filip Zubčić	(France) Mathieu Faivre	(Austria) Stefan Brennsteiner	
1811	29	28 February 2021	(Bulgaria) Bansko	GS _{427}	(France) Mathieu Faivre	(Switzerland) Marco Odermatt	(France) Alexis Pinturault	
		6 March 2021	(Norway) Kvitfjell	DH _{cnx}	cancelled due to the COVID-19 pandemic (moved to Saalbach-Hinterglemm on same dates)			
		7 March 2021	(Norway) Kvitfjell	SG _{cnx}	cancelled due to the COVID-19 pandemic (moved to Saalbach-Hinterglemm on same dates)			
		(Note: DH scheduled on 16 January 2021 in Wengen was moved to Saalbach-Hinterglemm on 5 March 2021)5 March 2021	(Austria) Saalbach-Hinterglemm	DH _{cnx}	cancelled due to fog after nine skiers had run			
1812	30	(Note: DH scheduled on 6 March 2021 in Kvitfjell was moved to Saalbach-Hinterglemm on 6 March 2021)6 March 2021	(Austria) Saalbach-Hinterglemm	DH _{503}	(Austria) Vincent Kriechmayr	(Switzerland) Beat Feuz	(Austria) Matthias Mayer	
1813	31	(Note: SG scheduled on 7 March 2021 in Kvitfjell was moved to Saalbach-Hinterglemm on 7 March 2021)7 March 2021	(Austria) Saalbach-Hinterglemm	SG _{223}	(Switzerland) Marco Odermatt	(France) Matthieu Bailet	(Austria) Vincent Kriechmayr	
1814	32	13 March 2021	(Slovenia) Kranjska Gora	GS _{428}	(Switzerland) Marco Odermatt	(Switzerland) Loïc Meillard	(Austria) Stefan Brennsteiner	
1815	33	14 March 2021	(Slovenia) Kranjska Gora	SL _{507}	(France) Clément Noël	(France) Victor Muffat-Jeandet	(Switzerland) Ramon Zenhäusern	
		17 March 2021	(Switzerland) Lenzerheide	DH _{cnx}	cancelled due to heavy snowfall			
		18 March 2021	(Switzerland) Lenzerheide	SG _{cnx}	cancelled due to fog and snowfall			
1816	34	20 March 2021	(Switzerland) Lenzerheide	GS _{429}	(France) Alexis Pinturault	(Croatia) Filip Zubčić	(France) Mathieu Faivre	
1817	35	21 March 2021	(Switzerland) Lenzerheide	SL _{508}	(Austria) Manuel Feller	(France) Clément Noël	(France) Alexis Pinturault	

=== Rankings ===
==== Overall ====
Rank	after all 35 races	Points
	(France) Alexis Pinturault	1260
2	(Switzerland) Marco Odermatt	1093
3	(Austria) Marco Schwarz	814
4	(Switzerland) Loïc Meillard	805
5	(Croatia) Filip Zubčić	764

==== Downhill ====
Rank	after all 7 races	Points
	(Switzerland) Beat Feuz	486
2	(Austria) Matthias Mayer	418
3	(Italy) Dominik Paris	338
4	(France) Johan Clarey	272
5	(Austria) Vincent Kriechmayr	267

==== Super-G ====
Rank	after all 6 races	Points
	(Austria) Vincent Kriechmayr	401
2	(Switzerland) Marco Odermatt	318
3	(Austria) Matthias Mayer	276
4	(Switzerland) Mauro Caviezel	225
5	(Norway) Aleksander Aamodt Kilde	172

==== Giant slalom ====
Rank	after all 10 races	Points
	(France) Alexis Pinturault	700
2	(Switzerland) Marco Odermatt	649
3	(Croatia) Filip Zubčić	606
4	(Switzerland) Loïc Meillard	393
5	(France) Mathieu Faivre	378

==== Slalom ====
Rank	after all 11 races	Points
	(Austria) Marco Schwarz	665
2	(France) Clément Noël	553
3	(Switzerland) Ramon Zenhäusern	503
4	(Austria) Manuel Feller	488
5	(Norway) Sebastian Foss-Solevåg	431

==== Parallel (PG) ====
Rank	after all 1 race	Points
	(France) Alexis Pinturault	100
2	(Norway) Henrik Kristoffersen	80
3	(Germany) Alexander Schmid	60
4	(Austria) Adrian Pertl	50
5	(Switzerland) Semyel Bissig	45

== Women ==
The number of races in World Cup history

Total	DH	SG	GS	SL	AC	PS	PG	CE	K.O.	Winners
1697	424	244	426	478	106	6	2	10	1	251

after GS in Lenzerheide (21 March 2021)

=== Calendar ===
Event key: DH – Downhill, SL – Slalom, GS – Giant slalom, SG – Super giant slalom, PS – Parallel slalom, PG – Parallel giant slalom
#	Event	Date	Venue	Type	Winner	Second	Third	Details
1667	1	17 October 2020	(Austria) Sölden	GS _{419}	(Italy) Marta Bassino	(Italy) Federica Brignone	(Slovakia) Petra Vlhová	
1668	2	21 November 2020	(Finland) Levi	SL _{470}	(Slovakia) Petra Vlhová	(United States) Mikaela Shiffrin	(Austria) Katharina Liensberger	
1669	3	22 November 2020	(Finland) Levi	SL _{471}	(Slovakia) Petra Vlhová	(Switzerland) Michelle Gisin	(Austria) Katharina Liensberger	
1670	4	26 November 2020	(Austria) Lech/Zürs	PG _{002}	(Slovakia) Petra Vlhová	(United States) Paula Moltzan	(Switzerland) Lara Gut-Behrami	
		5 December 2020	(Switzerland) St. Moritz	SG _{cnx}	heavy snow and wind; first race moved to Crans Montana second race moved to Val di Fassa			
		6 December 2020	(Switzerland) St. Moritz	SG _{cnx}	heavy snow and wind; first race moved to Crans Montana second race moved to Val di Fassa			
1671	5	12 December 2020	(France) Courchevel	GS _{420}	(Italy) Marta Bassino	(Sweden) Sara Hector	(Slovakia) Petra Vlhová	
1672	6	14 December 2020	(France) Courchevel	GS _{421}	(United States) Mikaela Shiffrin	(Italy) Federica Brignone	(France) Tessa Worley	
1673	7	18 December 2020	(France) Val-d'Isère	DH _{418}	(Switzerland) Corinne Suter	(Italy) Sofia Goggia	(United States) Breezy Johnson	
1674	8	19 December 2020	(France) Val-d'Isère	DH _{419}	(Italy) Sofia Goggia	(Switzerland) Corinne Suter	(United States) Breezy Johnson	
1675	9	20 December 2020	(France) Val-d'Isère	SG _{239}	(Czech Republic) Ester Ledecká	(Switzerland) Corinne Suter	(Italy) Federica Brignone	
		28 December 2020	(Austria) Semmering	GS _{cnx}	second run and competition canceled; strong wind			
1676	10	29 December 2020	(Austria) Semmering	SL _{472}	(Switzerland) Michelle Gisin	(Austria) Katharina Liensberger	(United States) Mikaela Shiffrin	
1677	11	3 January 2021	(Croatia) Zagreb	SL _{473}	(Slovakia) Petra Vlhová	(Austria) Katharina Liensberger	(Switzerland) Michelle Gisin	
1678	12	9 January 2021	(Austria) St. Anton	DH _{420}	(Italy) Sofia Goggia	(Austria) Tamara Tippler	(United States) Breezy Johnson	
1679	13	10 January 2021	(Austria) St. Anton	SG _{240}	(Switzerland) Lara Gut-Behrami	(Italy) Marta Bassino	(Switzerland) Corinne Suter	
1680	14	12 January 2021	(Austria) Flachau	SL _{474}	(United States) Mikaela Shiffrin	(Austria) Katharina Liensberger	(Switzerland) Wendy Holdener	
1681	15	16 January 2021	(Slovenia) Kranjska Gora	GS _{422}	(Italy) Marta Bassino	(France) Tessa Worley	(Switzerland) Michelle Gisin	
1682	16	17 January 2021	(Slovenia) Kranjska Gora	GS _{423}	(Italy) Marta Bassino	(Switzerland) Michelle Gisin	(Slovenia) Meta Hrovat	
1683	17	22 January 2021	(Switzerland) Crans-Montana	DH _{421}	(Italy) Sofia Goggia	(Czech Republic) Ester Ledecká	(United States) Breezy Johnson	
1684	18	23 January 2021	(Switzerland) Crans-Montana	DH _{422}	(Italy) Sofia Goggia	(Switzerland) Lara Gut-Behrami	(Italy) Elena Curtoni	
1685	19	24 January 2021	(Switzerland) Crans-Montana	SG _{241}	(Switzerland) Lara Gut-Behrami	(Austria) Tamara Tippler	(Italy) Federica Brignone	
1686	20	26 January 2021	(Italy) Kronplatz	GS _{424}	(France) Tessa Worley	(Switzerland) Lara Gut-Behrami	(Italy) Marta Bassino	
1687	21	30 January 2021	(Germany) Garmisch-Partenkirchen	SG _{242}	(Switzerland) Lara Gut-Behrami	(Norway) Kajsa Vickhoff Lie	(Canada) Marie-Michèle Gagnon	
1688	22	1 February 2021	(Germany) Garmisch-Partenkirchen	SG _{243}	(Switzerland) Lara Gut-Behrami	(Slovakia) Petra Vlhová	(Austria) Tamara Tippler	
World Championships (8–21 February)
1689	23	26 February 2021	(Italy) Val di Fassa	DH _{423}	(Switzerland) Lara Gut-Behrami	(Austria) Ramona Siebenhofer	(Switzerland) Corinne Suter	
1690	24	27 February 2021	(Italy) Val di Fassa	DH _{424}	(Switzerland) Lara Gut-Behrami	(Switzerland) Corinne Suter	(Germany) Kira Weidle	
1691	25	28 February 2021	(Italy) Val di Fassa	SG _{244}	(Italy) Federica Brignone	(Switzerland) Lara Gut-Behrami	(Switzerland) Corinne Suter	
1692	26	6 March 2021	(Slovakia) Jasná	SL _{475}	(United States) Mikaela Shiffrin	(Slovakia) Petra Vlhová	(Switzerland) Wendy Holdener	
1693	27	7 March 2021	(Slovakia) Jasná	GS _{425}	(Slovakia) Petra Vlhová	(New Zealand) Alice Robinson	(United States) Mikaela Shiffrin	
1694	28	12 March 2021	(Sweden) Åre	SL _{476}	(Slovakia) Petra Vlhová	(Austria) Katharina Liensberger	(United States) Mikaela Shiffrin	
1695	29	13 March 2021	(Sweden) Åre	SL _{477}	(Austria) Katharina Liensberger	(United States) Mikaela Shiffrin	(Switzerland) Wendy Holdener	
		17 March 2021	(Switzerland) Lenzerheide	DH _{cnx}	cancelled due to heavy snowfall			
		18 March 2021	(Switzerland) Lenzerheide	SG _{cnx}	cancelled due to fog and snowfall			
1696	30	20 March 2021	(Switzerland) Lenzerheide	SL _{478}	(Austria) Katharina Liensberger	(United States) Mikaela Shiffrin	(Switzerland) Michelle Gisin	
1697	31	21 March 2021	(Switzerland) Lenzerheide	GS _{426}	(New Zealand) Alice Robinson	(United States) Mikaela Shiffrin	(Slovenia) Meta Hrovat	

=== Rankings ===
==== Overall ====
Rank	after all 31 races	Points
	(Slovakia) Petra Vlhová	1416
2	(Switzerland) Lara Gut-Behrami	1256
3	(Switzerland) Michelle Gisin	1130
4	(United States) Mikaela Shiffrin	1075
5	(Austria) Katharina Liensberger	903

==== Downhill ====
Rank	after all 7 races	Points
	(Italy) Sofia Goggia	480
2	(Switzerland) Corinne Suter	410
3	(Switzerland) Lara Gut-Behrami	383
4	(United States) Breezy Johnson	330
5	(Germany) Kira Weidle	265

==== Super-G ====
Rank	after all 6 races	Points
	(Switzerland) Lara Gut-Behrami	525
2	(Italy) Federica Brignone	323
3	(Switzerland) Corinne Suter	310
4	(Austria) Tamara Tippler	272
5	(Czech Republic) Ester Ledecká	236

==== Giant slalom ====
Rank	after all 8 races	Points
	(Italy) Marta Bassino	546
2	(United States) Mikaela Shiffrin	420
3	(France) Tessa Worley	391
4	(Switzerland) Michelle Gisin	389
5	(Italy) Federica Brignone	372

==== Slalom ====
Rank	after all 9 races	Points
	(Austria) Katharina Liensberger	690
2	(United States) Mikaela Shiffrin	655
3	(Slovakia) Petra Vlhová	652
4	(Switzerland) Michelle Gisin	491
5	(Switzerland) Wendy Holdener	415

==== Parallel (PG) ====
Rank	after all 1 race	Points
	(Slovakia) Petra Vlhová	100
2	(United States) Paula Moltzan	80
3	(Switzerland) Lara Gut-Behrami	60
4	(Sweden) Sara Hector	50
5	(Italy) Marta Bassino	45

== Alpine team event ==
World Cup history in real time

Total	SL + SG	PG	Winners
15	3	12	6

after PG in Lenzerheide (20 March 2021)

=== Calendar ===
Event key: PG – Parallel giant slalom
#	Event	Date	Venue	Type	Winner	Second	Third	Details
World Championships (8–21 February)
15	1	19 March 2021	(Switzerland) Lenzerheide	PG _{012}	Norway Sebastian Foss-Solevåg; Kristin Lysdahl; Leif Kristian Nestvold-Haugen; Kristina Riis-Johannessen	Germany Lena Dürr; Andrea Filser; Alexander Schmid; Linus Straßer	Austria Franziska Gritsch; Fabio Gstrein; Christian Hirschbühl*; Katharina Huber; Adrian Pertl; Ramona Siebenhofer*	

* reserve skiers

== Nations Cup ==
Overall

Rank	after all 67 races	Points
1	Switzerland	10087
2	Austria	9211
3	Italy	5735
4	France	4991
5	Norway	4591

Men

Rank	after all 36 races	Points
1	Switzerland	5329
2	Austria	5258
3	France	4141
4	Norway	3068
5	Italy	1936

Women

Rank	after all 32 races	Points
1	Switzerland	4758
2	Austria	3953
3	Italy	3799
4	United States	2154
5	Norway	1523

== Prize money ==
Top-5 men

Rank	after all 35 races	CHF
1	(France) Alexis Pinturault	379,064
2	(Austria) Vincent Kriechmayr	335,090
3	(Switzerland) Marco Odermatt	285,920
4	(Austria) Marco Schwarz	263,780
5	(Switzerland) Beat Feuz	226,440

Top-5 women

Rank	after all 31 races	CHF
1	(Switzerland) Lara Gut-Behrami	485,091
2	(Slovakia) Petra Vlhová	444,501
3	(United States) Mikaela Shiffrin	410,978
4	(Austria) Katharina Liensberger	333,129
5	(Italy) Marta Bassino	288,606

== Achievements ==
First World Cup career victory

Men

- (Norway) Lucas Braathen (20), in his third season – Giant slalom in Sölden
- (Slovenia) Martin Čater (27), in his ninth season – Downhill in Val-d'Isère
- (Switzerland) Mauro Caviezel (32), in his twelfth season – Super-G in Val-d'Isère
- (United States) Ryan Cochran-Siegle (28), in his ninth season – Super-G in Bormio
- (Austria) Manuel Feller (28), in his ninth season – Slalom in Flachau
- (Norway) Sebastian Foss-Solevåg (29), in his ninth season – Slalom in Flachau

Women

- (Switzerland) Michelle Gisin (27), in her ninth season – Slalom in Semmering
- (Austria) Katharina Liensberger (23), in her sixth season – Slalom in Åre

First World Cup podium

Men

- (Norway) Lucas Braathen (20), in his third season – Giant slalom in Sölden – 1st place
- (Slovenia) Martin Čater (27), in his ninth season – Downhill in Val-d'Isère – 1st place
- (France) Matthieu Bailet (24), in his sixth season – Super-G in Saalbach-Hinterglemm – 2nd place
- (United States) Ryan Cochran-Siegle (28), in his ninth season – Downhill in Val Gardena – 2nd place
- (Norway) Atle Lie McGrath (20), in his third season – Giant slalom in Alta Badia – 2nd place
- (Norway) Adrian Smiseth Sejersted (26), in his seventh season – Super-G in Val-d'Isère – 2nd place
- (Switzerland) Gino Caviezel (28), in his tenth season – Giant slalom in Sölden – 3rd place
- (Switzerland) Justin Murisier (28), in his ninth season – Giant slalom in Alta Badia – 3rd place
- (Switzerland) Sandro Simonet (25), in his fifth season – Slalom in Chamonix – 3rd place
- (Austria) Christian Walder (29), in his fifth season – Super-G in Val-d'Isère – 3rd place
- (Austria) Stefan Brennsteiner (29), in his ninth season – Giant slalom in Bansko - 3rd place

Women

- (United States) Paula Moltzan (26), in her eighth season – Parallel-G in Lech/Zürs – 2nd place
- (Norway) Kajsa Vickhoff Lie (22), in her fifth season – Super-G in Garmisch-Partenkirchen – 2nd place
- (United States) Breezy Johnson (24), in her fifth season – Downhill in Val-d'Isère – 3rd place

Number of wins this season (in brackets are all-time wins)

Men

- (France) Alexis Pinturault – 5 (34)
- (Austria) Vincent Kriechmayr – 3 (9)
- (Switzerland) Marco Odermatt – 3 (4)
- (Norway) Henrik Kristoffersen – 2 (23)
- (Switzerland) Beat Feuz – 2 (15)
- (France) Clément Noël – 2 (8)
- (Norway) Aleksander Aamodt Kilde – 2 (6)
- (Austria) Marco Schwarz – 2 (4)
- (Croatia) Filip Zubčić – 2 (3)
- (Austria) Manuel Feller – 2 (2)
- (Italy) Dominik Paris – 1 (19)
- (Austria) Matthias Mayer – 1 (10)
- (Switzerland) Ramon Zenhäusern – 1 (4)
- (France) Mathieu Faivre – 1 (2)
- (Germany) Linus Straßer – 1 (2)
- (Norway) Lucas Braathen – 1 (1)
- (Switzerland) Mauro Caviezel – 1 (1)
- (Slovenia) Martin Čater – 1 (1)
- (United States) Ryan Cochran-Siegle – 1 (1)
- (Norway) Sebastian Foss-Solevåg – 1 (1)

Women

- (Switzerland) Lara Gut-Behrami – 6 (32)
- (Slovakia) Petra Vlhová – 6 (20)
- (Italy) Sofia Goggia – 4 (11)
- (Italy) Marta Bassino – 4 (5)
- (United States) Mikaela Shiffrin – 3 (69)
- (Austria) Katharina Liensberger – 2 (2)
- (Italy) Federica Brignone – 1 (16)
- (France) Tessa Worley – 1 (14)
- (New Zealand) Alice Robinson – 1 (3)
- (Switzerland) Corinne Suter – 1 (3)
- (Czech Republic) Ester Ledecká – 1 (2)
- (Switzerland) Michelle Gisin – 1 (1)

== Retirements ==
The following athletes announced their retirements during or after the season:

=== Men ===
- (Italy) Fabian Bacher
- (France) Rémy Falgoux
- (France) Valentin Giraud-Moine
- (Switzerland) Marc Gisin
- (France) Jean-Baptiste Grange
- (France) Victor Guillot
- (United States) Ted Ligety
- (France) Julien Lizeroux
- (Germany) Bastian Meisen
- (Norway) Jonathan Nordbotten
- (Germany) Frederik Norys
- (Austria) Hannes Reichelt
- (France) Maxime Rizzo
- (Italy) Giordano Ronci

=== Women ===
- (Austria) Eva-Maria Brem
- (Italy) Irene Curtoni
- (France) Joséphine Forni
- (Andorra) Mireia Gutiérrez
- (Sweden) Lin Ivarsson
- (Switzerland) Rahel Kopp
- (United States) Alice McKennis Duran
- (France) Jennifer Piot
- (United States) Laurenne Ross
- (Austria) Bernadette Schild
- (United States) Resi Stiegler
- (Germany) Marina Wallner
- (Germany) Michaela Wenig
- (Sweden) Emelie Wikström
