= Tiffany Gauthier =

French alpine ski racer (born 1993)

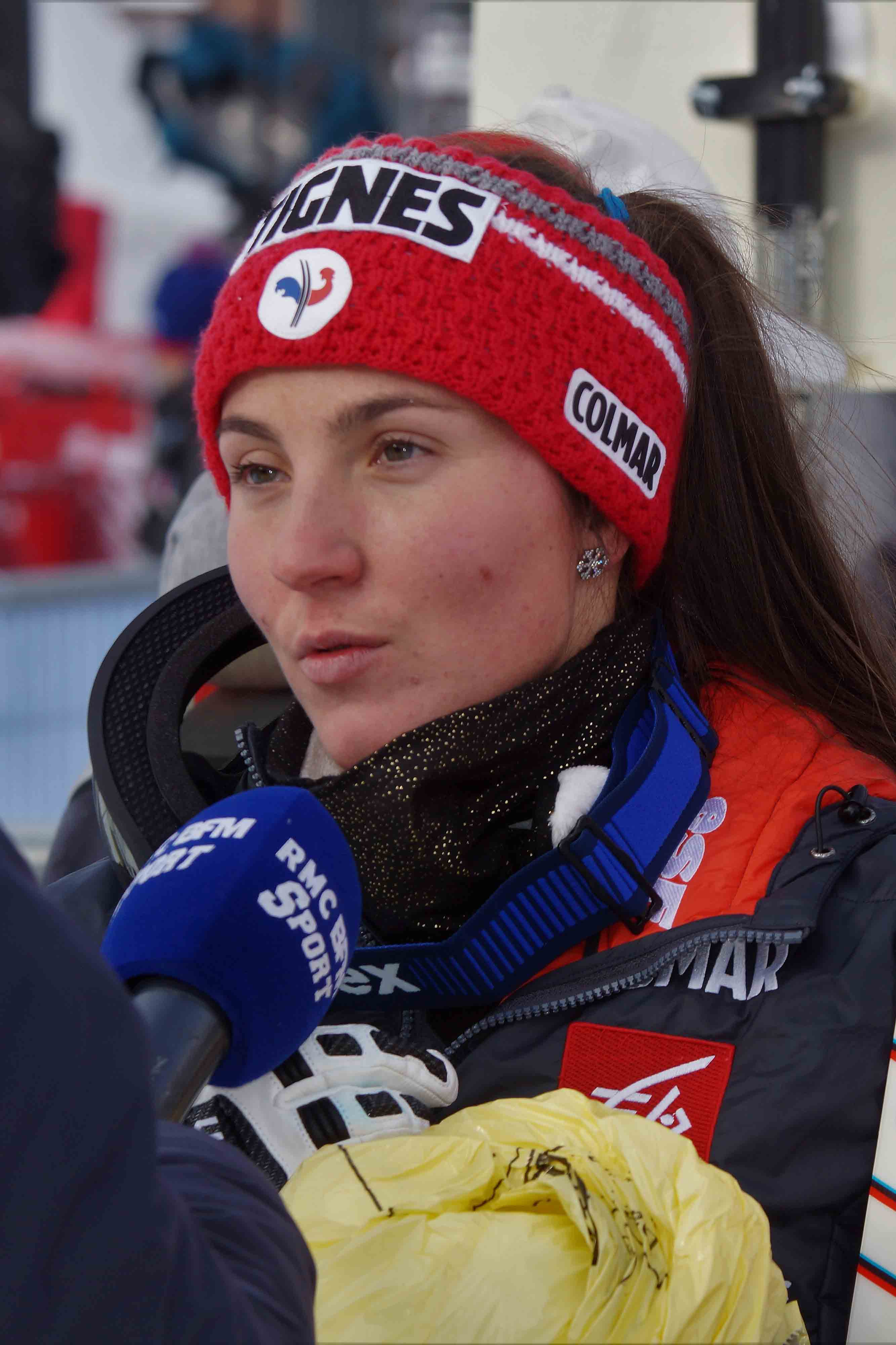
- Gauthier in 2017

Personal information
- Born: 2 December 1993 (age 32) Saint-Étienne, France

Skiing career
- Sport: Alpine skiing
- Club: CS Tignes
- Disciplines: Super-G, Downhill

Olympics
- Teams: 1 (2018)

World Championships
- Teams: 1 - (2021)

Tiffany Gauthier (born 2 December 1993) is a French former alpine ski racer.

== Season standings ==
Season
Season	Age	Overall	Slalom	Giant; Slalom	Super G	Downhill	Combined
2017	23	72	—	—	25	43	—
2018	24	37	—	—	20	23	—
2019	25	85	—	—	37	39	—
2020	26	51	—	—	23	31	—
2021	27	48	—	—	17	31	—

Standings through 13 February 2021

== World Championship results ==
Year	Age	Slalom	Giant slalom	Super-G	Downhill	Combined
2021	27			21	23	

== Olympic results ==
Year
Year	Age	Slalom	Giant; Slalom	Super G	Downhill	Combined
2018	24	—	—	22	13	—
