= Olimpia delle Tofane =

Downhill ski course in Cortina d'Ampezzo, Italy

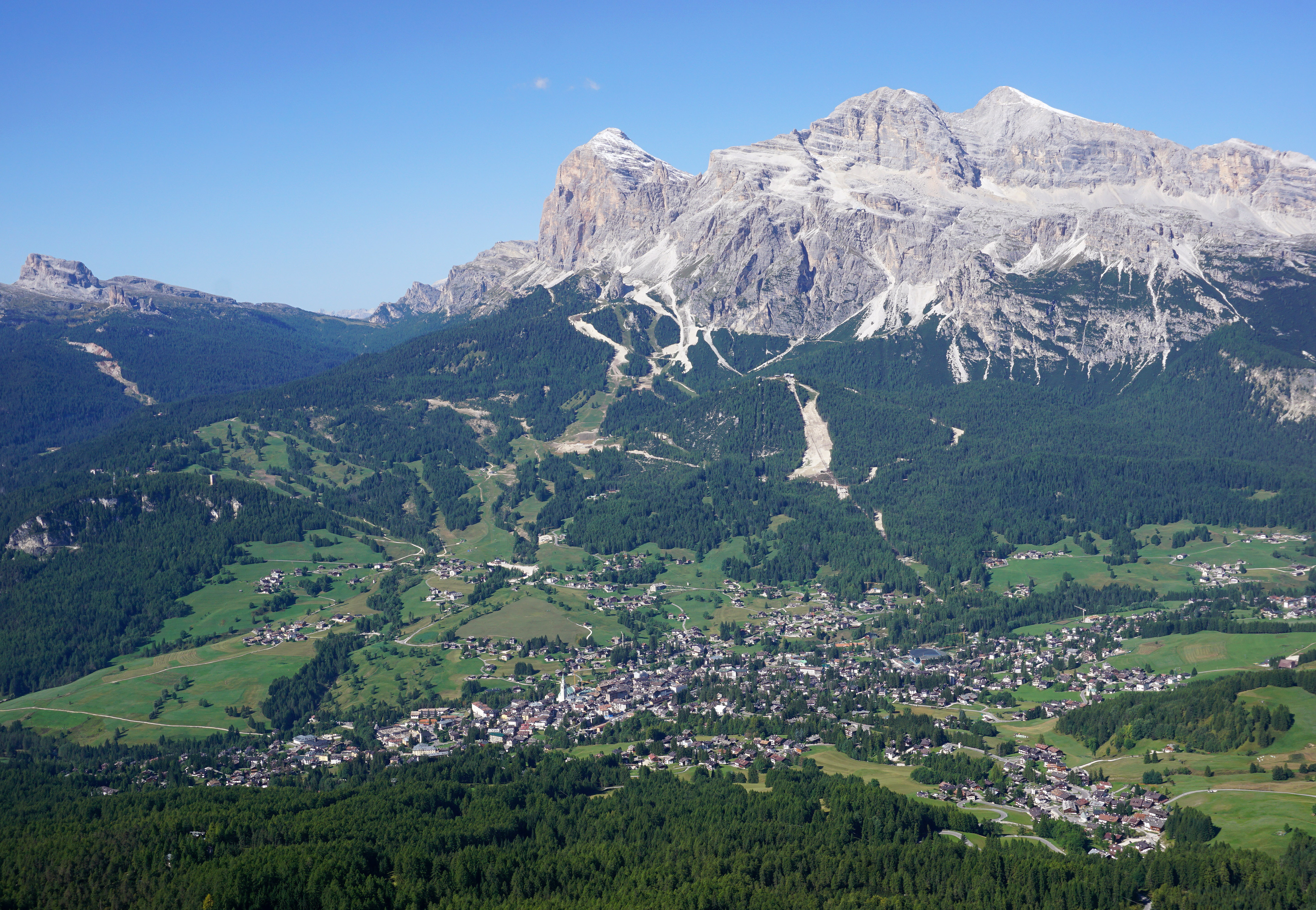
- The Tofane above Cortina d'Ampezzo, seen from Faloria
- Interactive map of Olimpia delle Tofane
- Location within Italy Location within Alps Location within Europe
- 46°32′05″N 12°07′13″E
- Location: Cortina d'Ampezzo, Italy
- Mountain: Tofana di Mezzo
- Opened: 1956, 70 years ago
- Member: Club5+
- Level: expert
- Competition: World Cup, Olympics, World Championships

Downhill
- Start: 2,320 m (7,612 ft) (AA)
- Finish: 1,560 m (5,118 ft)
- Vertical drop: 760 m (2,493 ft)
- Length: 2.56 km (1.59 mi)
- Max incline: 65%
- Avg incline: 30%
- Most Wins (W): Lindsey Vonn (12)

Olimpia delle Tofane is a downhill ski course in Cortina d'Ampezzo, Italy, on the lower slopes of the Tofane. It staged the men's downhill of the 1956 Winter Olympics and is the regular venue of the women's World Cup races at Cortina. It hosted the women's races of the 2021 World Championships, the women's alpine skiing events of the 2026 Winter Olympics, and the para-alpine skiing events of the 2026 Winter Paralympics.

The best-known section of the course is the Tofana Schuss, a steep chute that passes between two high rock outcrops near the top of the run. Lindsey Vonn won a record twelve World Cup races on the course, six each in downhill and super-G.

== Course ==
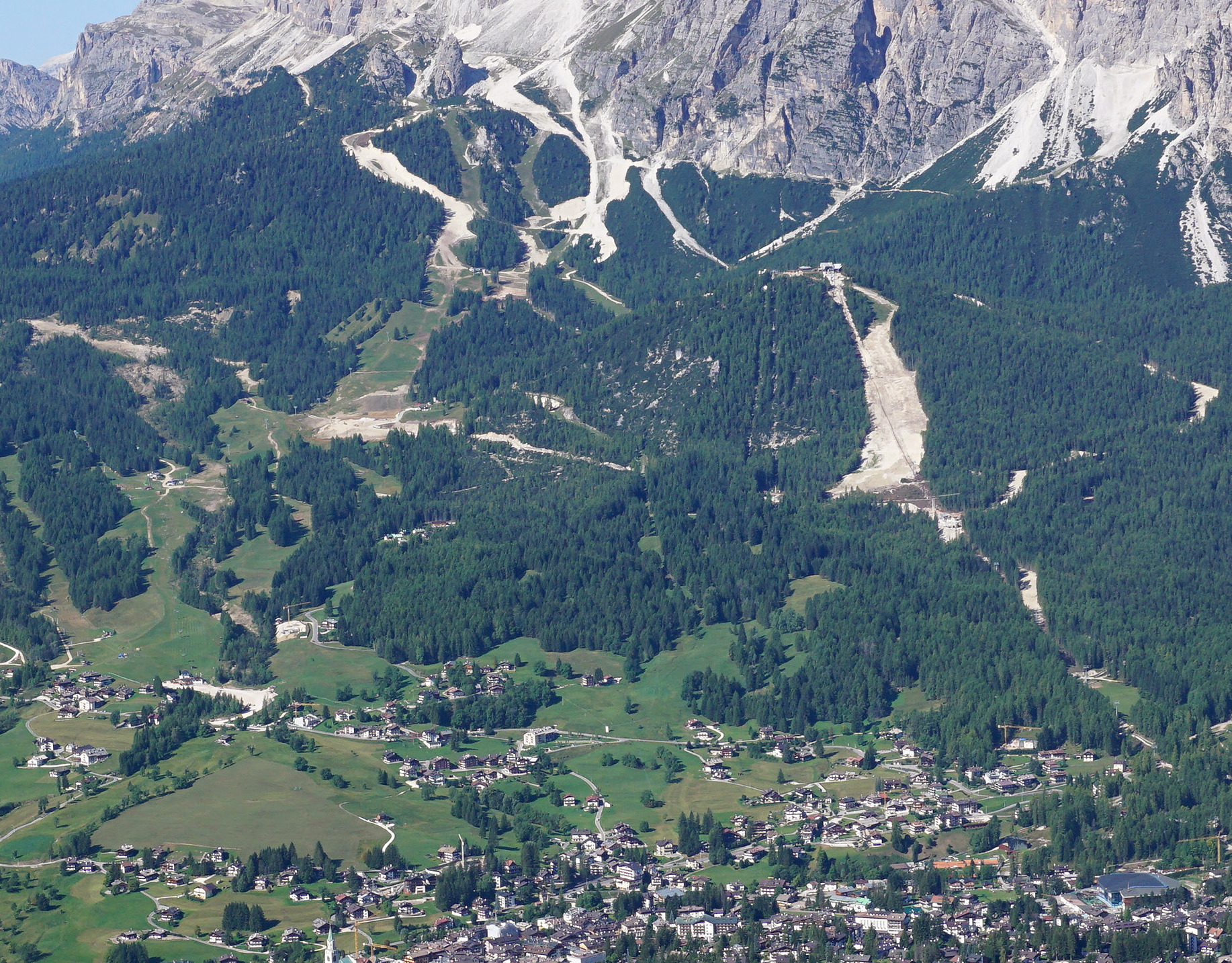
The course corridor below the rock outcrops Ra Pegna and Ra Bujela, seen from Faloria

The downhill starts at 2,320 m (7,612 ft) above sea level and drops 760 m (2,493 ft) over about 2.56 km (1.59 mi) to the finish at 1,560 m (5,118 ft); the maximum gradient is 65% and the average 30%.

The race opens near the Rifugio Pomedes with the Tofana Schuss, a wall with a gradient of up to 65% that funnels the racers over a jump between two rock outcrops about twenty seconds into the run; speeds there reach about 135 km/h (84 mph). A blind left turn named the Delta follows; hang gliders (deltaplani) launch from the spot in summer. The Duca d'Aosta jump, beside the hut where the super-G starts, leads into the middle part of the course, where the Gran Curvone and the Scarpadon combine fast turns, technical stretches and changes of gradient; other named passages include the Primo Muro, the Secondo Muro and the Diagonale. The lower course runs across the Pale di Rumerlo and ends with a final traverse and a man-made finish jump nicknamed the "tooth".

== Olympics ==
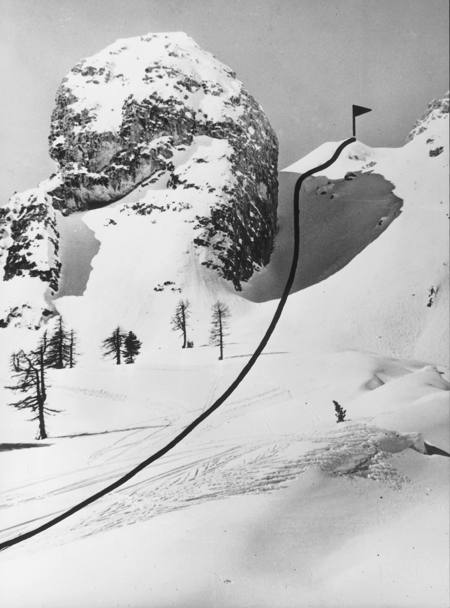
The course in 1956, passing the rock outcrops near the start

=== Men's events ===
Year	Event	Date	Gold	Silver	Bronze
1956	DH	3 February 1956	(Austria) Toni Sailer	(Switzerland) Raymond Fellay	(Austria) Anderl Molterer

From 1948 through 1980, the Winter Olympics were also the World Championships for alpine skiing.

=== Women's events ===
Year	Type	Date	Gold	Silver	Bronze
2026	DH	8 February 2026	(United States) Breezy Johnson	(Germany) Emma Aicher	(Italy) Sofia Goggia
2026	SG	12 February 2026	(Italy) Federica Brignone	(France) Romane Miradoli	(Austria) Cornelia Hütter
2026	GS	15 February 2026	(Italy) Federica Brignone	(Norway) Thea Louise Stjernesund (Sweden) Sara Hector	
2026	SL	18 February 2026	(United States) Mikaela Shiffrin	(Switzerland) Camille Rast	(Sweden) Anna Swenn-Larsson

=== Women's team combined ===
Year	Type	Date	Gold	Silver	Bronze
2026	TKB	10 February 2026	Austria II Ariane Rädler; Katharina Huber	Germany Kira Weidle-Winkelmann; Emma Aicher	United States II Jacqueline Wiles; Paula Moltzan

== World Championships ==
=== Men's events ===
Year	Event	Date	Gold	Silver	Bronze
1956	DH	3 February 1956	(Austria) Toni Sailer	(Switzerland) Raymond Fellay	(Austria) Anderl Molterer
2021	AC	15 February 2021	(Austria) Marco Schwarz	(France) Alexis Pinturault	(Switzerland) Loïc Meillard

For alpine skiing, the Winter Olympics were concurrent World Championships from 1948 through 1980.
The slalom run of the 2021 combined event was held on the "Rumerlo" course, the final part of the Olympia delle Tofane.

=== Women's events ===
Year	Event	Date	Gold	Silver	Bronze
2021	SG	11 February 2021	(Switzerland) Lara Gut-Behrami	(Switzerland) Corinne Suter	(United States) Mikaela Shiffrin
2021	DH	13 February 2021	(Switzerland) Corinne Suter	(Germany) Kira Weidle	(Switzerland) Lara Gut-Behrami
2021	AC	15 February 2021	(United States) Mikaela Shiffrin	(Slovakia) Petra Vlhová	(Switzerland) Michelle Gisin
2021	GS	18 February 2021	(Switzerland) Lara Gut-Behrami	(United States) Mikaela Shiffrin	(Austria) Katharina Liensberger

== World Cup ==
=== Men ===
No.	Type	Season	Date	Winner	Second	Third
50	DH	1968/69	9 February 1969	(Switzerland) Josef Minsch	(France) Jean-Pierre Augert	(Switzerland) Hans Peter Rohr
268	DH	1977/78	22 December 1977	(Italy) Herbert Plank	(Switzerland) Bernhard Russi	(Austria) Peter Wirnsberger
341	SL	1979/80	10 March 1980	(Sweden) Ingemar Stenmark	(Soviet Union) Aleksandr Zhirov	(Austria) Christian Orlainsky
342	GS	1979/80	11 March 1980	(Sweden) Ingemar Stenmark	(Austria) Hans Enn	(Switzerland) Joël Gaspoz
387	SL	1981/82	14 December 1981	(United States) Steve Mahre	(United States) Phil Mahre	(Sweden) Ingemar Stenmark
388	GS	1981/82	15 December 1981	(Socialist Federal Republic of Yugoslavia) Boris Strel	(United States) Phil Mahre	(Switzerland) Joël Gaspoz
475	DH	1983/84	2 February 1984	(Austria) Helmut Höflehner	(Switzerland) Urs Räber	(Switzerland) Conradin Cathomen
688	DH	1989/90	3 February 1990	(Italy) Kristian Ghedina	(Switzerland) Daniel Mahrer	(Austria) Helmut Höflehner
689	DH	1989/90	4 February 1990	(Austria) Helmut Höflehner	(Switzerland) Franz Heinzer (Norway) Atle Skårdal	
	DH	2019/20	18 March 2020	cancelled due to the COVID-19 pandemic		
	SG	2019/20	19 March 2020	cancelled due to the COVID-19 pandemic		
	GS	2019/20	21 March 2020	cancelled due to the COVID-19 pandemic		
	SL	2019/20	22 March 2020	cancelled due to the COVID-19 pandemic		
1880	SG	2022/23	28 January 2023	(Switzerland) Marco Odermatt	(Norway) A. Aamodt Kilde	(Italy) Mattia Casse
1881	SG	2022/23	29 January 2023	(Switzerland) Marco Odermatt	(Italy) Dominik Paris	(Austria) Daniel Hemetsberger

=== Women ===
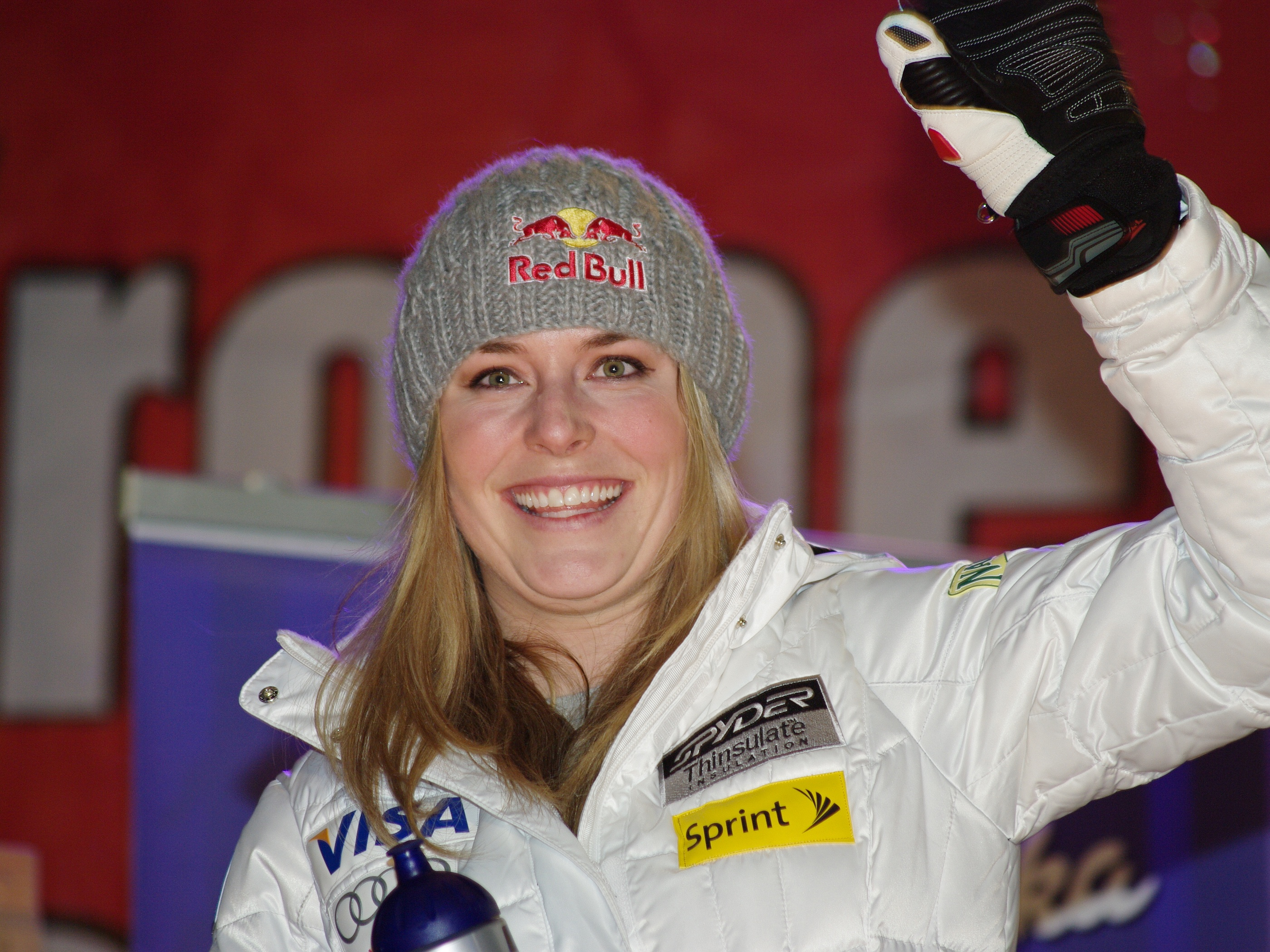
Lindsey Vonn won a record twelve World Cup races on the course, six each in downhill and super-G.

No.	Type	Season	Date	Winner	Second	Third
174	DH	1974/75	12 December 1974	(Austria) Annemarie Moser-Pröll	(United States) Cindy Nelson	(Austria) Wiltrud Drexel
175	SL	1974/75	13 December 1974	(West Germany) Rosi Mittermaier	(France) Fabienne Serrat	(West Germany) Christa Zechmeister
202	DH	1975/76	16 December 1975	(West Germany) Evi Mittermaier	(Austria) Brigitte Totschnig	(Switzerland) Bernadette Zurbriggen
203	SL	1975/76	17 December 1975	(France) Fabienne Serrat	(West Germany) Pamela Behr	(West Germany) Rosi Mittermaier
204	KB	1975/76	17 December 1975	(West Germany) Rosi Mittermaier	(Austria) Brigitte Totschnig	(Switzerland) Bernadette Zurbriggen
226	DH	1976/77	15 December 1976	(Austria) Annemarie Moser-Pröll	(Iran) Elena Matous	(Austria) Brigitte Totschnig
227	SL	1976/77	16 December 1976	(Switzerland) Lise-Marie Morerod	(Liechtenstein) Hanni Wenzel	(Italy) Claudia Giordani
228	KB	1976/77	16 December 1976	(Austria) Annemarie Moser-Pröll	(Switzerland) Lise-Marie Morerod	(Liechtenstein) Hanni Wenzel
714	DH	1992/93	9 January 1993	(Germany) Regina Häusl	(Switzerland) Heidi Zurbriggen	(Germany) Katja Seizinger
715	GS	1992/93	10 January 1993	(France) Carole Merle	(Austria) Anita Wachter	(Italy) Deborah Compagnoni
716	DH	1992/93	15 January 1993	(Germany) Katja Seizinger	(France) Carole Merle	(Austria) Barbara Sadleder
717	SG	1992/93	16 January 1993	(Austria) Ulrike Maier	(France) Carole Merle	(Austria) Sylvia Eder
718	SL	1992/93	17 January 1993	(Switzerland) Vreni Schneider	(New Zealand) Annelise Coberger	(Austria) Karin Buder
719	KB	1992/93	15 January 1993; 17 January 1993	(Austria) Anita Wachter	(Germany) Miriam Vogt	(Austria) Sabine Ginther
751	DH	1993/94	14 January 1994	(Germany) Katja Seizinger	(Austria) Veronika Stallmaier	(Canada) Kate Pace
752	SG	1993/94	15 January 1994	(Germany) Katja Seizinger	(Austria) Ulrike Maier	(Canada) Kerrin Lee-Gartner
753	GS	1993/94	16 January 1994	(Austria) Anita Wachter	(Italy) Deborah Compagnoni	(France) Leila Piccard
754	SG	1993/94	17 January 1994	(Sweden) Pernilla Wiberg (Slovenia) Alenka Dovžan		(Austria) Ulrike Maier
786	DH	1994/95	20 January 1995	(Germany) Michaela Gerg-Leitner	(United States) Picabo Street	(Germany) Katja Seizinger
787	DH	1994/95	22 January 1995	(United States) Picabo Street	(Italy) Barbara Merlin	(Germany) Katja Seizinger
788	GS	1994/95	23 January 1995	(Austria) Anita Wachter	(Switzerland) Vreni Schneider	(Slovenia) Špela Pretnar
821	DH	1995/96	19 January 1996	(United States) Picabo Street	(Sweden) Pernilla Wiberg	(Italy) Isolde Kostner
822	DH	1995/96	20 January 1996	(Italy) Isolde Kostner	(United States) Picabo Street	(Austria) Renate Götschl
823	GS	1995/96	21 January 1996	(Austria) Anita Wachter	(Sweden) Erika Hansson	(Germany) Katja Seizinger
854	DH	1996/97	23 January 1997	(Italy) Isolde Kostner (Switzerland) Heidi Zurbriggen		(Germany) Katja Seizinger
855	SG	1996/97	25 January 1997	(Italy) Isolde Kostner	(Sweden) Pernilla Wiberg	(Germany) Katja Seizinger
856	GS	1996/97	26 January 1997	(Italy) Deborah Compagnoni	(Germany) Katja Seizinger	(Switzerland) Sonja Nef
890	DH	1997/98	22 January 1998	(Italy) Isolde Kostner	(Austria) Renate Götschl	(France) Florence Masnada
891	SG	1997/98	23 January 1998	(France) Mélanie Suchet	(Germany) Regina Häusl	(Italy) Karen Putzer
892	SG	1997/98	24 January 1998	(Germany) Katja Seizinger	(Austria) Renate Götschl	(Italy) Isolde Kostner
893	GS	1997/98	25 January 1998	(Germany) Martina Ertl	(Germany) Katja Seizinger	(France) Sophie Lefranc-Duvillard
925	DH	1998/99	21 January 1999	(France) Régine Cavagnoud	(Italy) Isolde Kostner	(Germany) Hilde Gerg
926	SG	1998/99	22 January 1999	(Austria) Renate Götschl	(Germany) Martina Ertl	(France) Régine Cavagnoud
927	SG	1998/99	23 January 1999	(France) Régine Cavagnoud	(Switzerland) Sylviane Berthod	(Austria) Michaela Dorfmeister
928	GS	1998/99	24 January 1999	(Austria) Alexandra Meissnitzer	(Germany) Martina Ertl	(Austria) Anita Wachter
958	DH	1999/00	22 January 2000	(France) Régine Cavagnoud	(Austria) Tanja Schneider	(Slovenia) Mojca Suhadolc
959	GS	1999/00	23 January 2000	(Sweden) Anna Ottosson	(Canada) Allison Forsyth (Liechtenstein) Birgit Heeb	
999	DH	2000/01	19 January 2001	(Italy) Isolde Kostner	(Austria) Renate Götschl	(France) Régine Cavagnoud
1000	SG	2000/01	20 January 2001	(France) Régine Cavagnoud	(Canada) Mélanie Turgeon	(Austria) Renate Götschl
1001	GS	2000/01	21 January 2001	(Switzerland) Sonja Nef	(Canada) Allison Forsyth	(Austria) Michaela Dorfmeister
1033	SG	2001/02	25 January 2002	(Germany) Hilde Gerg	(Austria) Renate Götschl	(Austria) Alexandra Meissnitzer
1034	DH	2001/02	26 January 2002	(Austria) Renate Götschl	(Italy) Isolde Kostner	(Italy) Daniela Ceccarelli
1035	GS	2001/02	27 January 2002	(Norway) Stina Hofgård Nilsen	(Norway) Andrine Flemmen	(Italy) Karen Putzer
1063	SG	2002/03	15 January 2003	(France) Carole Montillet	(Austria) Renate Götschl	(Germany) Hilde Gerg
1064	SG	2002/03	17 January 2003	(Austria) Renate Götschl	(Austria) Alexandra Meissnitzer	(Canada) Mélanie Turgeon
1065	DH	2002/03	18 January 2003	(Austria) Renate Götschl	(United States) Kirsten Lee Clark	(Austria) Michaela Dorfmeister
1066	GS	2002/03	19 January 2003	(Sweden) Anja Pärson	(Croatia) Janica Kostelić	(Italy) Karen Putzer
1094	SG	2003/04	14 January 2004	(Canada) Geneviève Simard	(Germany) Maria Riesch	(Germany) Hilde Gerg
1095	SG	2003/04	16 January 2004	(Austria) Renate Götschl	(Germany) Martina Ertl	(Germany) Hilde Gerg
1096	DH	2003/04	17 January 2004	(Germany) Hilde Gerg	(Austria) Renate Götschl	(France) Carole Montillet
1097	DH	2003/04	18 January 2004	(France) Carole Montillet	(Austria) Renate Götschl	(United States) Lindsey Vonn
1130	SG	2004/05	12 January 2005	(Austria) Renate Götschl	(Sweden) Anja Pärson	(Germany) Martina Ertl
1131	SG	2004/05	14 January 2005	(Austria) Renate Götschl	(United States) Lindsey Kildow	(Austria) Silvia Berger
1132	DH	2004/05	15 January 2005	(Austria) Renate Götschl	(Croatia) Janica Kostelić	(United States) Lindsey Kildow
1133	DH	2004/05	16 January 2005	(Austria) Michaela Dorfmeister	(Austria) Renate Götschl	(Germany) Hilde Gerg
1167	SG	2005/06	27 January 2006	(Sweden) Anja Pärson	(United States) Julia Mancuso	(United States) Lindsey Kildow
1168	DH	2005/06	28 January 2006	(Austria) Renate Götschl	(United States) Julia Mancuso	(Austria) Elisabeth Görgl
1169	GS	2005/06	29 January 2006	(Austria) Nicole Hosp	(Canada) Geneviève Simard	(Austria) Elisabeth Görgl
1200	SG	2006/07	19 January 2007	(United States) Julia Mancuso	(Austria) Nicole Hosp	(Austria) Renate Götschl
1201	DH	2006/07	20 January 2007	(Austria) Renate Götschl	(United States) Julia Mancuso	(France) Marie Marchand-Arvier
1202	GS	2006/07	21 January 2007	(Italy) Karen Putzer	(United States) Julia Mancuso	(Italy) Denise Karbon
1235	DH	2007/08	19 January 2008	(United States) Lindsey Vonn	(Sweden) Anja Pärson	(Canada) Emily Brydon
1236	SG	2007/08	20 January 2008	(Austria) Maria Holaus	(United States) Julia Mancuso	(Austria) Nicole Hosp
1237	SG	2007/08	21 January 2008	(Germany) Maria Riesch	(Austria) Elisabeth Görgl	(Austria) Renate Götschl
	SG	2008/09	22 January 2009	blizzard; replaced on 26 January 2009		
	DH	2008/09	23 January 2009	heavy snowfall; replaced on 24 January 2009		
1269	DH	2008/09	24 January 2009	(Switzerland) Dominique Gisin	(United States) Lindsey Vonn	(Sweden) Anja Pärson
1270	GS	2008/09	25 January 2009	(Austria) Kathrin Zettel	(Austria) Michaela Kirchgasser	(Austria) Elisabeth Görgl
1271	SG	2008/09	26 January 2009	(Sweden) Jessica Lindell-Vikarby	(Austria) Anna Fenninger	(Switzerland) Andrea Dettling
1306	SG	2009/10	22 January 2010	(United States) Lindsey Vonn	(Switzerland) Fabienne Suter	(Sweden) Anja Pärson
1307	DH	2009/10	23 January 2010	(United States) Lindsey Vonn	(Germany) Maria Riesch	(Sweden) Anja Pärson (Switzerland) Nadja Kamer
1308	GS	2009/10	24 January 2010	(Finland) Tanja Poutiainen	(Germany) Viktoria Rebensburg	(Germany) Kathrin Hölzl
1336	SG	2010/11	21 January 2011	(United States) Lindsey Vonn	(Sweden) Anja Pärson	(Austria) Anna Fenninger
1337	DH	2010/11	22 January 2011	(Germany) Maria Riesch	(United States) Julia Mancuso	(United States) Lindsey Vonn
1338	SG	2010/11	23 January 2011	(United States) Lindsey Vonn	(Germany) Maria Riesch	(Switzerland) Lara Gut
1365	DH	2011/12	14 January 2012	(Italy) Daniela Merighetti	(United States) Lindsey Vonn	(Germany) Maria Höfl-Riesch
1366	SG	2011/12	15 January 2012	(United States) Lindsey Vonn	(Germany) Maria Höfl-Riesch	(Slovenia) Tina Maze
1409	DH	2012/13	19 January 2013	(United States) Lindsey Vonn	(Slovenia) Tina Maze	(United States) Leanne Smith
1410	SG	2012/13	20 January 2013	(Germany) Viktoria Rebensburg	(Austria) Nicole Schmidhofer	(Slovenia) Tina Maze
	DH	2013/14	18 January 2014	winter storm; DH rescheduled on 19 January 2014		
	DH	2013/14	19 January 2014	winter storm; second and final DH replacement on 24 January 2014		
	SG	2013/14	20 January 2014	winter storm; SG replaced on 23 January 2014		
1442	SG	2013/14	23 January 2014	(Austria) Elisabeth Görgl	(Germany) Maria Höfl-Riesch	(Austria) Nicole Hosp
1443	DH	2013/14	24 January 2014	(Germany) Maria Höfl-Riesch	(Liechtenstein) Tina Weirather	(Austria) Nicole Schmidhofer
1444	DH	2013/14	25 January 2014	(Slovenia) Tina Maze	(Switzerland) M. Kaufmann-Abderhalden	(Liechtenstein) Tina Weirather
1445	SG	2013/14	26 January 2014	(Switzerland) Lara Gut	(Liechtenstein) Tina Weirather	(Germany) Maria Höfl-Riesch
1470	DH	2014/15	16 January 2015	(Italy) Elena Fanchini	(Canada) Larisa Yurkiw	(Germany) Viktoria Rebensburg
	DH	2014/15	17 January 2015	too much snow; replaced on 18 January 2015		
	SG	2014/15	18 January 2015	original schedule; switch delay with downhill on 19 January 2015		
1471	DH	2014/15	18 January 2015	(United States) Lindsey Vonn	(Austria) Elisabeth Görgl	(Italy) Daniela Merighetti
1472	SG	2014/15	19 January 2015	(United States) Lindsey Vonn	(Austria) Anna Fenninger	(Liechtenstein) Tina Weirather
1507	DH	2015/16	23 January 2016	(United States) Lindsey Vonn	(Canada) Larisa Yurkiw	(Switzerland) Lara Gut
1508	SG	2015/16	24 January 2016	(United States) Lindsey Vonn	(Liechtenstein) Tina Weirather	(Germany) Viktoria Rebensburg
1550	DH	2016/17	28 January 2017	(Switzerland) Lara Gut	(Italy) Sofia Goggia	(Slovenia) Ilka Štuhec
1551	SG	2016/17	29 January 2017	(Slovenia) Ilka Štuhec	(Italy) Sofia Goggia	(Austria) Anna Veith
1585	DH	2017/18	19 January 2018	(Italy) Sofia Goggia	(United States) Lindsey Vonn	(United States) Mikaela Shiffrin
1586	DH	2017/18	20 January 2018	(United States) Lindsey Vonn	(Liechtenstein) Tina Weirather	(United States) Jacqueline Wiles
1587	SG	2017/18	21 January 2018	(Switzerland) Lara Gut	(Italy) Johanna Schnarf	(Austria) Nicole Schmidhofer
1621	DH	2018/19	18 January 2019	(Austria) Ramona Siebenhofer	(Slovenia) Ilka Štuhec	(Austria) Stephanie Venier
1622	DH	2018/19	19 January 2019	(Austria) Ramona Siebenhofer	(Austria) Nicole Schmidhofer	(Slovenia) Ilka Štuhec
1623	SG	2018/19	20 January 2019	(United States) Mikaela Shiffrin	(Liechtenstein) Tina Weirather	(Austria) Tamara Tippler
	DH	2019/20	18 March 2020	cancelled due to the COVID-19 pandemic		
	SG	2019/20	19 March 2020	cancelled due to the COVID-19 pandemic		
	SL	2019/20	21 March 2020	cancelled due to the COVID-19 pandemic		
	GS	2019/20	22 March 2020	cancelled due to the COVID-19 pandemic		
1720	DH	2021/22	22 January 2022	(Italy) Sofia Goggia	(Austria) Ramona Siebenhofer	(Czech Republic) Ester Ledecká
1721	SG	2021/22	23 January 2022	(Italy) Elena Curtoni	(Austria) Tamara Tippler	(Switzerland) Michelle Gisin
1756	DH	2022/23	20 January 2023	(Italy) Sofia Goggia	(Slovenia) Ilka Štuhec	(Germany) Kira Weidle
1757	DH	2022/23	21 January 2023	(Slovenia) Ilka Štuhec	(Norway) Kajsa Vickhoff Lie	(Italy) Elena Curtoni
1758	SG	2022/23	22 January 2023	(Norway) Ragnhild Mowinckel	(Austria) Cornelia Hütter	(Italy) Marta Bassino
1795	DH	2023/24	26 January 2024	(Austria) Stephanie Venier	(Switzerland) Lara Gut-Behrami	(Austria) Christina Ager (Italy) Sofia Goggia (Canada) Valérie Grenier
1796	DH	2023/24	27 January 2024	(Norway) Ragnhild Mowinckel	(United States) Jacqueline Wiles	(Italy) Sofia Goggia
1797	SG	2023/24	28 January 2024	(Switzerland) Lara Gut-Behrami	(Austria) Stephanie Venier	(France) Romane Miradoli
1827	DH	2024/25	18 January 2025	(Italy) Sofia Goggia	(Norway) Kajsa Vickhoff Lie	(Italy) Federica Brignone
1828	SG	2024/25	19 January 2025	(Italy) Federica Brignone	(Switzerland) Lara Gut-Behrami	(Switzerland) Corinne Suter

Not part of classic Cortina d'Ampezzo races. Replaced St. Moritz (2011), Ga-Pa (2014), Bad Kleinkirchheim (2015), Val-d'Isère (2018), St. Anton (2019, 2023).

== Club5+ ==
In 1986, the organizers of five classic downhill races (at Kitzbühel, Wengen, Garmisch-Partenkirchen, Val-d'Isère and Val Gardena) founded Club5, an association to promote alpine ski racing at the highest level. Long-standing organizers at Alta Badia, Cortina, Kranjska Gora, Maribor, Lake Louise, Schladming, Adelboden, Kvitfjell, St. Moritz and Åre joined later, and the group is now called Club5+.
