= Jennifer Piot =

French alpine skier (born 1992)

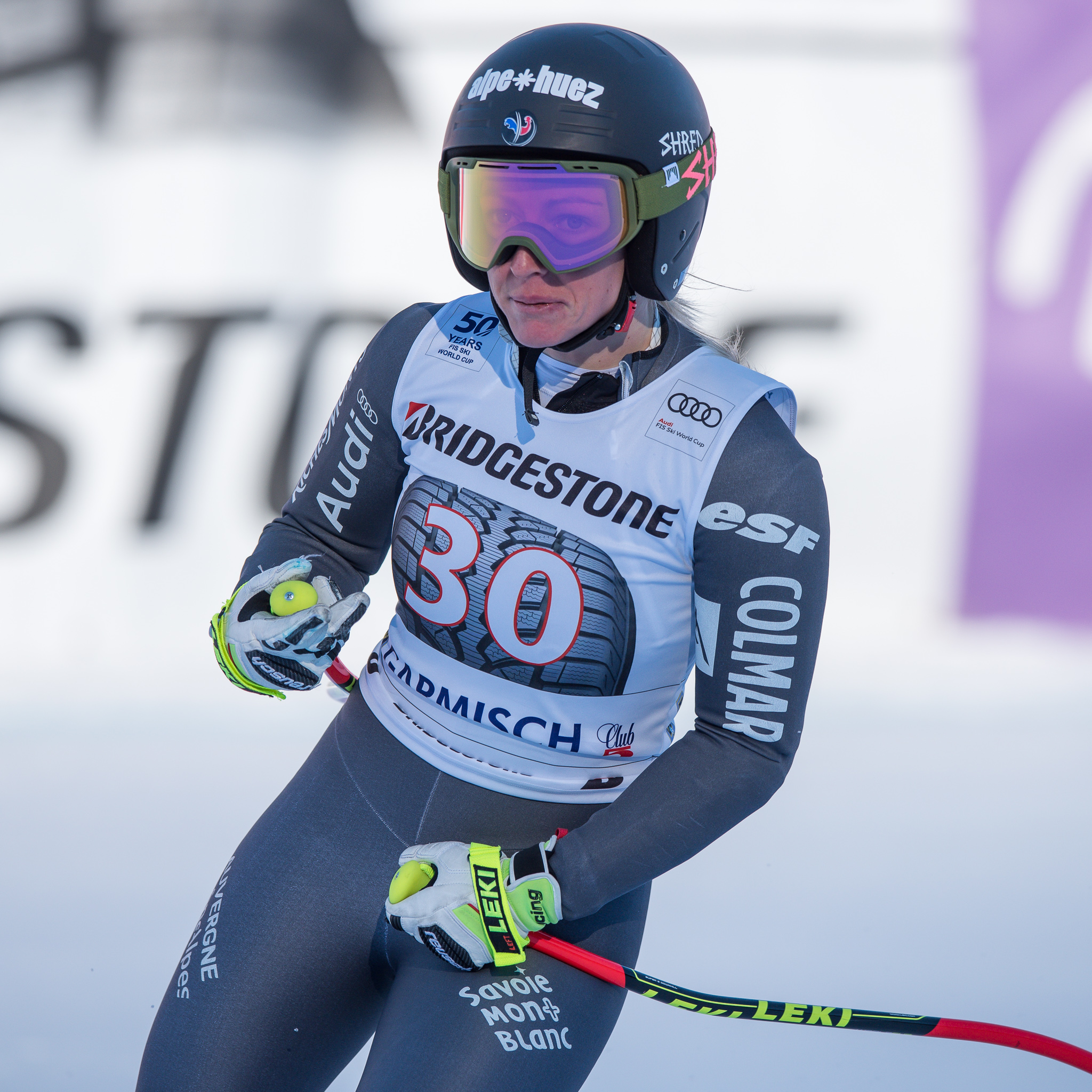
- Piot in January 2017

Personal information
- Born: 24 March 1992 (age 34) La Tronche, France

Skiing career
- Sport: Alpine skiing

Jennifer Piot (born 24 March 1992) is a French former alpine ski racer.

She competed at the 2015 World Championships in Beaver Creek, USA, in the Super-G.
