= Aleksandra Prokopyeva =

Russian alpine skier (born 1994)

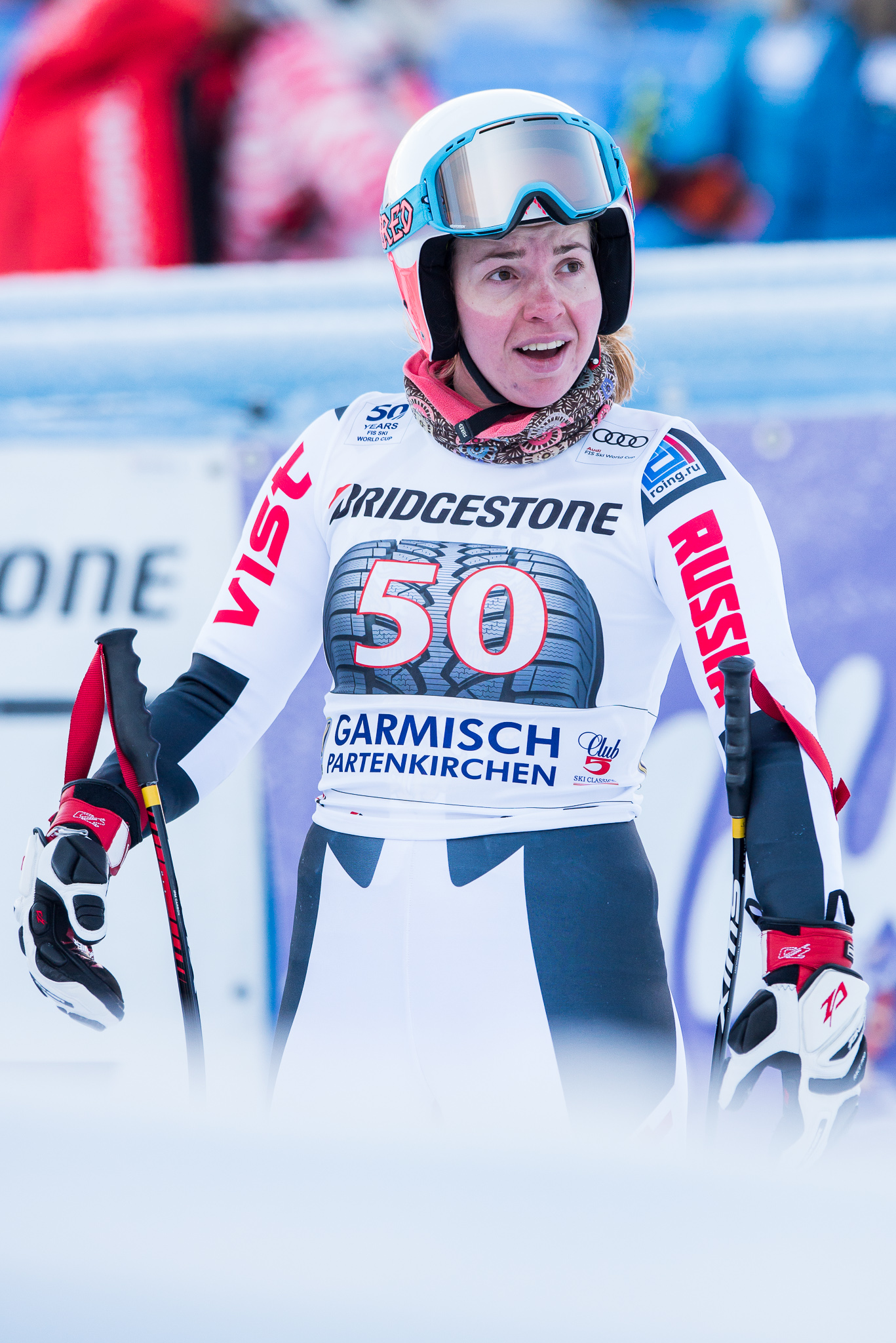

Aleksandra Prokopyeva (born 24 July 1994) is a Russian alpine ski racer.

She competed in the FIS Alpine World Ski Championships 2017 – Women's downhill with a time of 1:35.46 28.

Aleksandra uses a Redster S9 FIS M slalom racer.
