= FIS Alpine World Ski Championships 2019 =

Skiing event in Åre, Sweden

Coordinates: 63.415°N 13.062°E

- Host city: Åre
- Country: Sweden
- Nations: 76
- Events: 11
- Opening: 4 February 2019
- Closing: 17 February 2019
- Opened by: Carl XVI Gustaf
- Website: are2019.com

Location in Europe
Location in Sweden

The FIS Alpine World Ski Championships 2019 were held from 4 to 17 February 2019 in Åre, Sweden. The host city was selected at the FIS Congress in Barcelona, Spain, on 5 June 2014. The only other applicant was Cortina d'Ampezzo, Italy, which later gained the 2021 championships.

Åre previously hosted the world championships in 1954 and 2007, and has held numerous World Cup events.

== Schedule and course information ==
=== Schedule ===
Eleven events were held.

All times are local (UTC+1).

Events calendar
Events			Event days													
Events			Mo	Tu	We	Th	Fr	Sa	Su	Mo	Tu	We	Th	Fr	Sa	Su
Events			4	5	6	7	8	9	10	11	12	13	14	15	16	17
Events			February													
Opening and closing ceremonies			•													•
Men
Men	Downhill							12:30								
Men	Super-G				12:30											
Men	Alpine combined	Downhill								11:00						
Men	Alpine combined	Slalom								16:00						
Men	Giant slalom	Run 1												14:15		
Men	Giant slalom	Run 2												17:45		
Men	Slalom	Run 1														11:00
Men	Slalom	Run 2														14:30
Women
Women	Downhill								12:30							
Women	Super-G			12:30												
Women	Alpine combined	Downhill					11:00									
Women	Alpine combined	Slalom					16:15									
Women	Giant slalom	Run 1											14:15			
Women	Giant slalom	Run 2											17:45			
Women	Slalom	Run 1													11:00	
Women	Slalom	Run 2													14:30	
Mixed	Team event										16:00					

=== Course information ===
Date	Race	Start elevation	Finish elevation	Vertical drop	Course length	Average gradient
5 February	Super-G – women	898 m (2,946 ft)	396 m (1,299 ft)	502 m (1,647 ft)	1.670 km (1.038 mi)	30.1%
6 February	Super-G – men	1,033 m (3,389 ft)	396 m (1,299 ft)	637 m (2,090 ft)	2.172 km (1.350 mi)	29.3%
8 February	Downhill – (AC) – women	971 m (3,186 ft)	396 m (1,299 ft)	575 m (1,886 ft)	1.930 km (1.199 mi)	29.7%
8 February	Slalom – (AC) – women	566 m (1,857 ft)	396 m (1,299 ft)	170 m (558 ft)		
9 February	Downhill – men	1,033 m (3,389 ft)	396 m (1,299 ft)	637 m (2,090 ft)	2.172 km (1.350 mi)	29.3%
10 February	Downhill – women	898 m (2,946 ft)	396 m (1,299 ft)	502 m (1,647 ft)	1.670 km (1.038 mi)	30.1%
11 February	Downhill – (AC) – men	1,033 m (3,389 ft)	396 m (1,299 ft)	637 m (2,090 ft)	2.172 km (1.350 mi)	29.3%
11 February	Slalom – (AC) – men	578 m (1,896 ft)	396 m (1,299 ft)	182 m (597 ft)		
12 February	Team Event – mixed	478 m (1,568 ft)	396 m (1,299 ft)	82 m (269 ft)		
14 February	Giant slalom – women	736 m (2,415 ft)	396 m (1,299 ft)	340 m (1,115 ft)		
15 February	Giant slalom – men	812 m (2,664 ft)	396 m (1,299 ft)	416 m (1,365 ft)	1.308 km (0.813 mi)	31.8%
16 February	Slalom – women	582 m (1,909 ft)	396 m (1,299 ft)	186 m (610 ft)	0.624 km (0.388 mi)	29.8%
17 February	Slalom – men	615 m (2,018 ft)	396 m (1,299 ft)	219 m (719 ft)	0.740 km (0.460 mi)	29.6%

== Medal summary ==
=== Medal table ===
* Host nation (Sweden)

Rank	Nation	Gold	Silver	Bronze	Total
1	Norway (NOR)	2	1	1	4
1	Switzerland (SUI)	2	1	1	4
3	United States (USA)	2	0	2	4
4	Austria (AUT)	1	4	3	8
5	France (FRA)	1	1	1	3
5	Italy (ITA)	1	1	1	3
5	Slovakia (SVK)	1	1	1	3
8	Slovenia (SLO)	1	1	0	2
9	Germany (GER)	0	1	0	1
9	Sweden (SWE)*	0	1	0	1
Totals (10 entries)		11	12	10	33

=== Men's events ===
Event	Gold		Silver		Bronze	
Downhill	Kjetil Jansrud; Norway	1:19.98	Aksel Lund Svindal; Norway	1:20.00	Vincent Kriechmayr; Austria	1:20.31
Super-G	Dominik Paris; Italy	1:24.20	Johan Clarey; France; Vincent Kriechmayr; Austria	1:24.29	None awarded	
Giant slalom	Henrik Kristoffersen; Norway	2:20.24	Marcel Hirscher; Austria	2:20.44	Alexis Pinturault; France	2:20.66
Slalom	Marcel Hirscher; Austria	2:05.86	Michael Matt; Austria	2:06.51	Marco Schwarz; Austria	2:06.62
Alpine combined	Alexis Pinturault; France	1:47.71	Štefan Hadalin; Slovenia	1:47.95	Marco Schwarz; Austria	1:48.17

=== Women's events ===
Event	Gold		Silver		Bronze	
Downhill	Ilka Štuhec; Slovenia	1:01.74	Corinne Suter; Switzerland	1:01.97	Lindsey Vonn; United States	1:02.23
Super-G	Mikaela Shiffrin; United States	1:04.89	Sofia Goggia; Italy	1:04.91	Corinne Suter; Switzerland	1:04.94
Giant slalom	Petra Vlhová; Slovakia	2:01.97	Viktoria Rebensburg; Germany	2:02.11	Mikaela Shiffrin; United States	2:02.35
Slalom	Mikaela Shiffrin; United States	1:57.05	Anna Swenn-Larsson; Sweden	1:57.63	Petra Vlhová; Slovakia	1:58.08
Alpine combined	Wendy Holdener; Switzerland	2:02.13	Petra Vlhová; Slovakia	2:02.16	Ragnhild Mowinckel; Norway	2:02.58

=== Mixed ===
Event	Gold	Silver	Bronze
Team event	Switzerland; Aline Danioth; Andrea Ellenberger; Wendy Holdener; Sandro Simonet; Daniel Yule; Ramon Zenhäusern	Austria; Franziska Gritsch; Christian Hirschbühl; Katharina Liensberger; Michael Matt; Marco Schwarz; Katharina Truppe	Italy; Marta Bassino; Irene Curtoni; Lara Della Mea; Simon Maurberger; Riccardo Tonetti; Alex Vinatzer

== Participating countries ==
As of 5 December 2018, a total of 74 countries are scheduled to compete.

- Albania (5)
- Andorra (3)
- Argentina (5)
- Armenia (2)
- Australia (3)
- Austria (26)
- Belarus (4)
- Belgium (6)
- Bolivia (1)
- Bosnia and Herzegovina (8)
- Bulgaria (3)
- Canada (15)
- Chile (2)
- China (13)
- Chinese Taipei (1)
- Colombia (1)
- Croatia (8)
- Cyprus (4)
- Czech Republic (10)
- Denmark (5)
- Estonia (1)
- Finland (9)
- France (24)
- Georgia (5)
- Germany (22)
- Ghana (1)
- Great Britain (9)
- Greece (10)
- Haiti (2)
- Hungary (5)
- Iceland (8)
- India (1)
- Iran (11)
- Ireland (3)
- Israel (2)
- Italy (22)
- Japan (4)
- Jordan (1)
- Kazakhstan (3)
- Kosovo (5)
- Kyrgyzstan (4)
- Latvia (8)
- Lebanon (8)
- Liechtenstein (3)
- Lithuania (3)
- Luxembourg (2)
- North Macedonia (4)
- Madagascar (2)
- Malta (1)
- Mexico (3)
- Monaco (2)
- Montenegro (2)
- Morocco (2)
- Nepal (1)
- Netherlands (3)
- New Zealand (5)
- Norway (20)
- Peru (1)
- Poland (1)
- Portugal (3)
- Romania (3)
- Russia (9)
- Serbia (9)
- Slovakia (9)
- Slovenia (14)
- South Africa (1)
- South Korea (1)
- Spain (5)
- Sweden (24) (host nation)
- Switzerland (24)
- Thailand
- Timor-Leste (1)
- Tonga (1)
- Ukraine (5)
- United States (13)
- Uzbekistan (1)
- Venezuela (1)
