= Camille Rast =

Swiss alpine skier (born 1999)

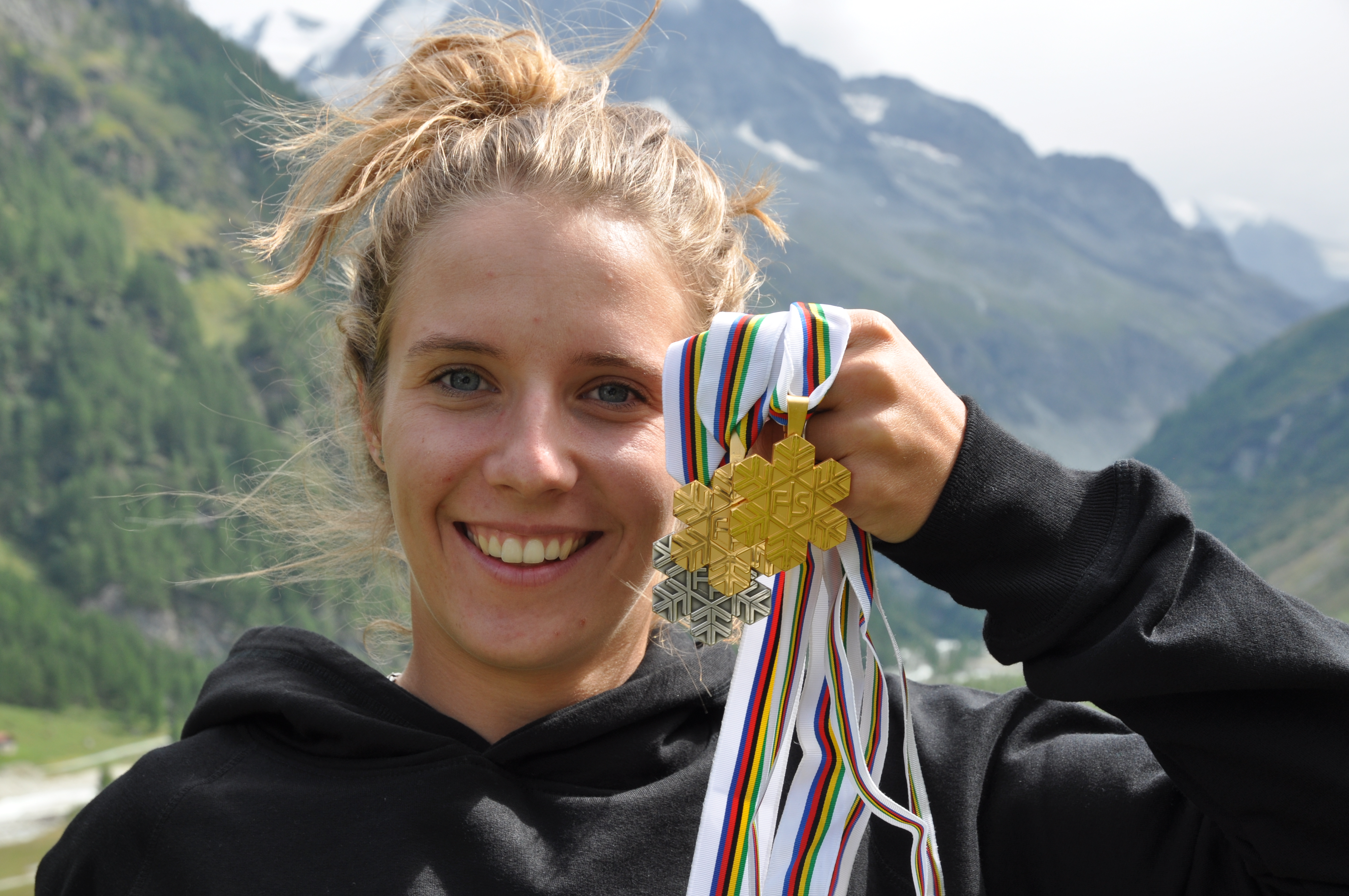
- Rast in 2019

Personal information
- Born: 9 July 1999 (age 27) Vétroz, Valais, Switzerland
- Height: 1.70 m (5 ft 7 in)
- Website: camillerast.ch

Skiing career
- Country: Switzerland
- Sport: Alpine skiing
- Club: Ski-Club Vetroz
- Disciplines: Slalom, giant slalom
- World Cup debut: 22 October 2016 (age 17)

Olympics
- Teams: 2 – (2022, 2026)
- Medals: 1 (0 gold)

World Championships
- Teams: 4 – (2017, 2021–25)
- Medals: 1 (1 gold)

World Cup
- Seasons: 9 – (2017–2019, 2021–2026)
- Wins: 4 – (3 SL, 1 GS)
- Podiums: 12 – (8 SL, 4 GS)
- Overall titles: 0 – (3rd in 2026)
- Discipline titles: 0 – (2nd in SL and GS, 2026)
Medal record
Women's alpine skiing
Representing Switzerland
Olympic Games
Silver medal – second place	2026 Milano Cortina	Slalom
World Championships
Gold medal – first place	2025 Saalbach	Slalom
World Junior Ski Championships
Gold medal – first place	2017 Åre	Slalom
Gold medal – first place	2018 Davos	Team Event
Silver medal – second place	2019 Val Di Fassa	Giant Slalom

Camille Rast (born 9 July 1999) is a Swiss World Cup alpine ski racer who competes in the technical disciplines of slalom and giant slalom. Born in Vétroz, Valais, she won the gold medal in the slalom at the 2025 World Championships. At the 2026 Winter Olympics, she won a silver medal in the slalom event.

== World Cup results ==
=== Season standings ===
Season
Season	Age	Overall	Slalom	Giant slalom	Super-G	Downhill	Combined	Parallel
2017	17	90	—	35	—	—	—	—N/a
2018	18	117	—	43	—	—	—	—N/a
2019	19	120	—	49	—	—	—	—N/a
2020	20	did not compete						
2021	21	52	20	49	—	—	—N/a	—
2022	22	38	20	16	—	—	—N/a	25
2023	23	52	25	31	—	—	—N/a	—N/a
2024	24	20	9	20	—	—	—N/a	—N/a
2025	25	6	3rd place, bronze medalist(s)	10	—	—	—N/a	—N/a
2026	26	3rd place, bronze medalist(s)	2nd place, silver medalist(s)	2nd place, silver medalist(s)	—	—	—N/a	—N/a
2027	27	6	—	6	—	—	—N/a	—N/a

Standings through 26 October 2026

=== Race podiums ===
- 4 wins – (3 SL, 1 GS)
- 12 podiums – (8 SL, 4 GS), 44 top tens

Season
Season	Date	Location	Discipline	Place
2025	23 November 2024	Gurgl, Austria	Slalom	3rd
2025	30 November 2024	Killington, United States	Giant slalom	3rd
2025	1 December 2024	Killington, United States	Slalom	1st
2025	14 January 2025	Flachau, Austria	Slalom	1st
2026	23 November 2025	Gurgl, Austria	Slalom	3rd
2026	16 December 2025	Courchevel, France	Slalom	2nd
2026	27 December 2025	Semmering, Austria	Giant slalom	2nd
2026	28 December 2025	Semmering, Austria	Slalom	2nd
2026	3 January 2026	Kranjska Gora, Slovenia	Giant slalom	1st
2026	4 January 2026	Kranjska Gora, Slovenia	Slalom	1st
2026	20 January 2026	Kronplatz, Italy	Giant slalom	2nd
2026	25 January 2026	(Czech Republic) Špindlerův Mlýn, Czech Republic	Slalom	2nd

== World Championship results ==
Year
Year	Age	Slalom	Giant slalom	Super-G	Downhill	Combined	Team combined	Parallel	Team event
2017	17	—	28	—	—	—	—N/a	—N/a	4
2021	21	8	—	—	—	—	—N/a	25	4
2023	23	27	14	—	—	—	—N/a	12	—
2025	25	1	11	—	—	—N/a	7	—N/a	—

== Olympic results ==
Year
Year	Age	Slalom	Giant slalom	Super-G	Downhill	Combined	Team combined	Team event
2022	22	7	16	—	—	—	—N/a	—
2026	26	2	12	—	—	—N/a	9	—N/a
