= Roc de Fer =

Downhill Alpine skiing course in Méribel, France

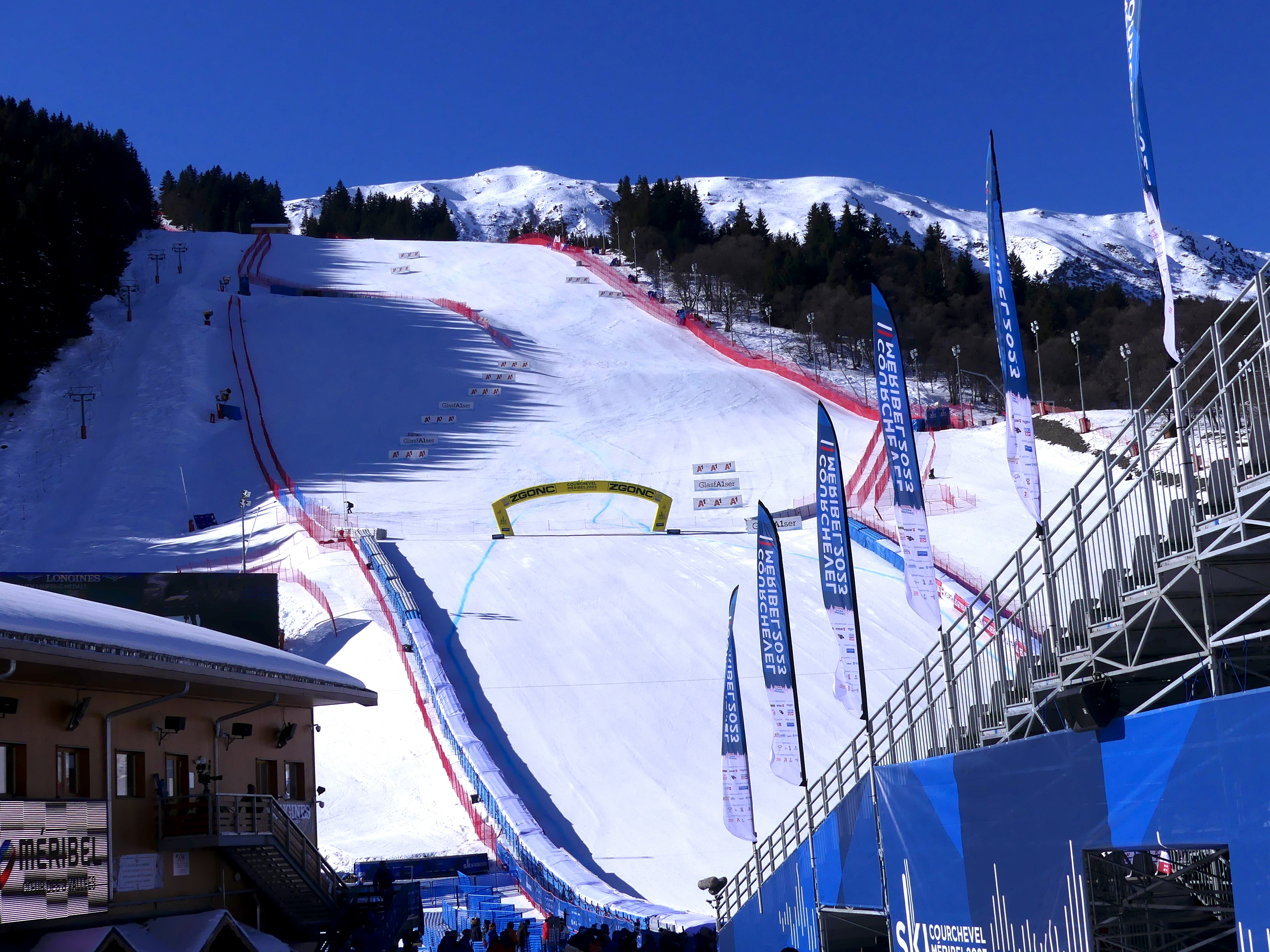
- Finish area in February 2023
- Interactive map of Roc de Fer
- Location within France Location within Alps Location within Europe
- 45°23′48″N 6°33′59″E
- Location: Méribel, France
- Opened: 10 February 1990

Downhill
- Start: 2,150 m (7,054 ft) (AA)
- Finish: 1,465 m (4,806 ft)
- Vertical drop: 685 m (2,247 ft)
- Length: 2.413 km (1.50 mi)
- Max incline: 28.8 degrees (55%)
- Min incline: 5.1 degrees (9%)

Roc de Fer (French: "iron rock") is a World Cup downhill ski course in Méribel, France, which is part of the large interlinked ski area known as Les Trois Vallées in the Savoie department of France, near Mont Blanc. The course was originally created for the 1992 Winter Olympics and has hosted the World Cup season finals (2015, 2022) and the 2023 World Championships, the latter two in conjunction with the L’Éclipse course in neighboring Courchevel.

Roc de Fer is under consideration as an alpine skiing venue for the upcoming 2030 Winter Olympics.

== History ==
Although Méribel has hosted an Alpine skiing slope with a chair lift since 1938, when the resort was developed and opened by a former Scottish military officer and avid skier named Peter Lindsay, and then expanded dramatically as a ski resort after World War II, it still needed a course upgrade when it was designated to host some of the skiing events for the 1992 Winter Olympics, which were centered in nearby Albertville.

According to the official record of the 1992 Games, the Roc de Fer course was developed after studying the sporting aspect and the environmental impact of the new course. For those Olympics, for which some of the course development was handled by former Olympic gold medalist Bernhard Russi, all five of the women's alpine events (downhill, Super-G, giant slalom, slalom, and combined) were planned for (and took place at) Roc de Fer.

In advance preparation for the Olympics, on 10–11 February 1990, the new Roc de Fer course was opened with two World Cup Super-Gs, both won by Carol Merle. Less than a year later in 1991, Petra Kronberger won consecutive World Cup events in downhill and Super-G.

During the Olympics, some of the female skiers were displeased with being "isolated" in Méribel instead of being housed in a communal Olympic village, as had been the case in the prior Olympics in Calgary.

After the Olympics, outside of a slalom in 1994, the Roc de Fer course remained dormant on the World Cup circuit for twenty years. But then, a women's World Cup downhill and combined were held on the course on 23-24 February 2013, and the course once again returned to the World Cup circuit. More significantly, the course hosted the World Cup season finals in 2015 and later co-hosted both the season finals in 2022 (hosting all of the men's and women's technical events (giant slalom, slalom, and mixed team parallel)) and the 2023 FIS World Ski Championships (hosting all of the traditional women's events, similar to the 1992 Winter Olympics, as well as both men's and women's individual parallel giant slalom and the mixed team parallel event) in combination with the L’Éclipse course in Courchevel.

Also, during the 2022 Winter Olympics in Beijing, Méribel held a celebration in honor of the 30th anniversary of the 1992 Olympic skiing at Roc de Fer and the hockey in the town.

== Events ==
=== Winter Olympics ===
Year	Date	Event	Winner	Second place	Third place
↓ Women ↓
1992	12–13 February	KB	(Austria) Petra Kronberger	(Austria) Anita Wachter	(France) Florence Masnada
1992	15 February	DH	(Canada) Kerrin Lee-Gartner	(United States) Hilary Lindh	(Austria) Veronika Wallinger
1992	18 February	SG	(Italy) Deborah Compagnoni	(France) Carole Merle	(Germany) Katja Seizinger
1992	19 February	GS	(Sweden) Pernilla Wiberg	(Austria) Anita Wachter (United States) Diann Roffe	
1992	20 February	SL	(Austria) Petra Kronberger	(New Zealand) Annelise Coberger	(Spain) B. Fernández Ochoa

=== World Championships ===
Year	Date	Event	Winner	Second place	Third place
↓ Women ↓
2023	6 February	AC	(Italy) Federica Brignone	(Switzerland) Wendy Holdener	(Austria) Ricarda Haaser
2023	8 February	SG	(Italy) Marta Bassino	(United States) Mikaela Shiffrin	(Austria) Cornelia Hütter (Norway) Kajsa Vickhoff Lie
2023	11 February	DH	(Switzerland) Jasmine Flury	(Austria) Nina Ortlieb	(Switzerland) Corinne Suter
2023	15 February	PG	(Norway) Maria Therese Tviberg	(Switzerland) Wendy Holdener	(Norway) Thea L. Stjernesund
2023	16 February	GS	(United States) Mikaela Shiffrin	(Italy) Federica Brignone	(Norway) Ragnhild Mowinckel
2023	18 February	SL	(Canada) Laurence St-Germain	(United States) Mikaela Shiffrin	(Germany) Lena Dürr
↓ Men ↓
2023	15 February	PG	(Germany) Alexander Schmid	(Austria) Dominik Raschner	(Norway) Timon Haugan
↓ Alpine team event ↓
2023	14 February	PG (Team)	United States Tommy Ford; Katie Hensien; Paula Moltzan; Nina O'Brien; River Radamus; Luke Winters	Norway Timon Haugan; Kristin Lysdahl; L. K. Nestvold-Haugen; Alexander Steen Olsen; Thea Louise Stjernesund; Maria Therese Tviberg	Canada Valerie Grenier; Jeffrey Read; Erik Read; Britt Richardson

=== World Cup ===
Season	Date	Event	Winner	Second place	Third place
↓ Women ↓
1989/90	10 February	SG	(France) Carole Merle	(Switzerland) Maria Walliser	(West Germany) Michaela Gerg
1989/90	11 February	SG	(France) Carole Merle	(West Germany) Katja Seizinger	(Switzerland) Maria Walliser
1990/91	19 January	DH	(Austria) Petra Kronberger	(France) Carole Merle	(Austria) Veronika Wallinger
1990/91	20 January	SG	(Austria) Petra Kronberger	(Germany) Michaela Gerg	(France) Carole Merle
1994/95	30 December	SL	(Slovenia) Urška Hrovat	(Switzerland) Vreni Schneider	(France) Leila Piccard
2012/13	23 February	DH	(Spain) Carolina Ruiz Castillo	(Germany) Maria Höfl-Riesch	(France) Marie Marchand-Arvier
2012/13	24 February	KB	(Slovenia) Tina Maze	(Austria) Nicole Hosp	(Austria) Michaela Kirchgasser
2014/15	18 March	DH	(United States) Lindsey Vonn	(Austria) Elisabeth Görgl	(Austria) Nicole Hosp
2014/15	19 March	SG	(United States) Lindsey Vonn	(Austria) Anna Fenninger	(Slovenia) Tina Maze
2014/15	21 March	SL	(United States) Mikaela Shiffrin	(Sweden) Frida Hansdotter	(Slovakia) Veronika Velez-Zuzulová
2014/15	22 March	GS	(Austria) Anna Fenninger	(Austria) Eva-Maria Brem	(Slovenia) Tina Maze
2021/22	19 March	SL	(Slovenia) Andreja Slokar	(Germany) Lena Dürr	(Slovakia) Petra Vlhová
2021/22	20 March	GS	(Italy) Federica Brignone	(Italy) Marta Bassino	(Slovakia) Petra Vlhová
↓ Men ↓
2014/15	18 March	DH	(Norway) Kjetil Jansrud	(Switzerland) Didier Défago	(Austria) Georg Streitberger
2014/15	19 March	SG	(Canada) Dustin Cook	(Norway) Kjetil Jansrud	(France) Brice Roger
2014/15	21 March	GS	(Norway) Henrik Kristoffersen	(Germany) Fritz Dopfer	(France) Thomas Fanara
2014/15	22 March	SL	(Austria) Marcel Hirscher	(Italy) Giuliano Razzoli	(Russia) Alexander Khoroshilov
2021/22	19 March	GS	(Switzerland) Marco Odermatt	(Norway) Lucas Braathen	(Switzerland) Loïc Meillard
2021/22	20 March	SL	(Norway) Atle Lie McGrath	(Norway) Henrik Kristoffersen	(Austria) Manuel Feller
↓ Alpine team events ↓
2014/15	20 March	PG (Team)	Switzerland Charlotte Chable; Michelle Gisin; Wendy Holdener; Gino Caviezel; Justin Murisier; Reto Schmidiger	Sweden Sara Hector; Anna Swenn-Larsson; Emelie Wikström; Mattias Hargin; Anton Lahdenperä; André Myhrer	Austria Eva-Maria Brem; Carmen Thalmann; Christoph Nösig; Philipp Schörghofer
2021/22	18 March	PG (Team)	Switzerland Delphine Darbellay; Andrea Ellenberger; Fadri Janutin; Livio Simonet	Austria Stefan Brennsteiner; Patrick Feurstein; Fabio Gstrein*; Ricarda Haaser; Katharina Huber*; Katharina Truppe	Germany Lena Dürr; Fabian Gratz; Antonia Kermer; Julian Rauchfuß

== Course sections ==
- Petit Col – Departs des Militaires – Bosse De Anglais – Tunnel – Beage's Wall – La Traverse – Pracua – Le Goulet – Le Stade

One source described the Roc de Fer downhill course as "having a steep start", permitting skiers to accelerate to over 100 km/hour in less than eight seconds, but then requiring more technical skills due to both turns and "many rolls and bumps".
