= United States at the FIS Alpine World Ski Championships 2021 =

United States at the 2021 FIS Alpine World Ski Championships
- IOC code: USA
- National federation: U.S. Ski & Snowboard
- Website: www.usskiandsnowboard.org

in (Italy) Cortina d'Ampezzo
- Competitors: 16 (8 men, 8 women)
- Medals Ranked 5th: Gold 1 Silver 1 Bronze 2 Total 4

FIS Alpine World Ski Championships appearances
- 1931; 1932; 1933; 1934; 1935; 1936; 1937; 1938; 1939; 1948; 1950; 1952; 1954; 1956; 1958; 1960; 1962; 1964; 1966; 1968; 1970; 1972; 1974; 1976; 1978; 1980; 1982; 1985; 1987; 1989; 1991; 1993; 1996; 1997; 1999; 2001; 2003; 2005; 2007; 2009; 2011; 2013; 2015; 2017; 2019; 2021

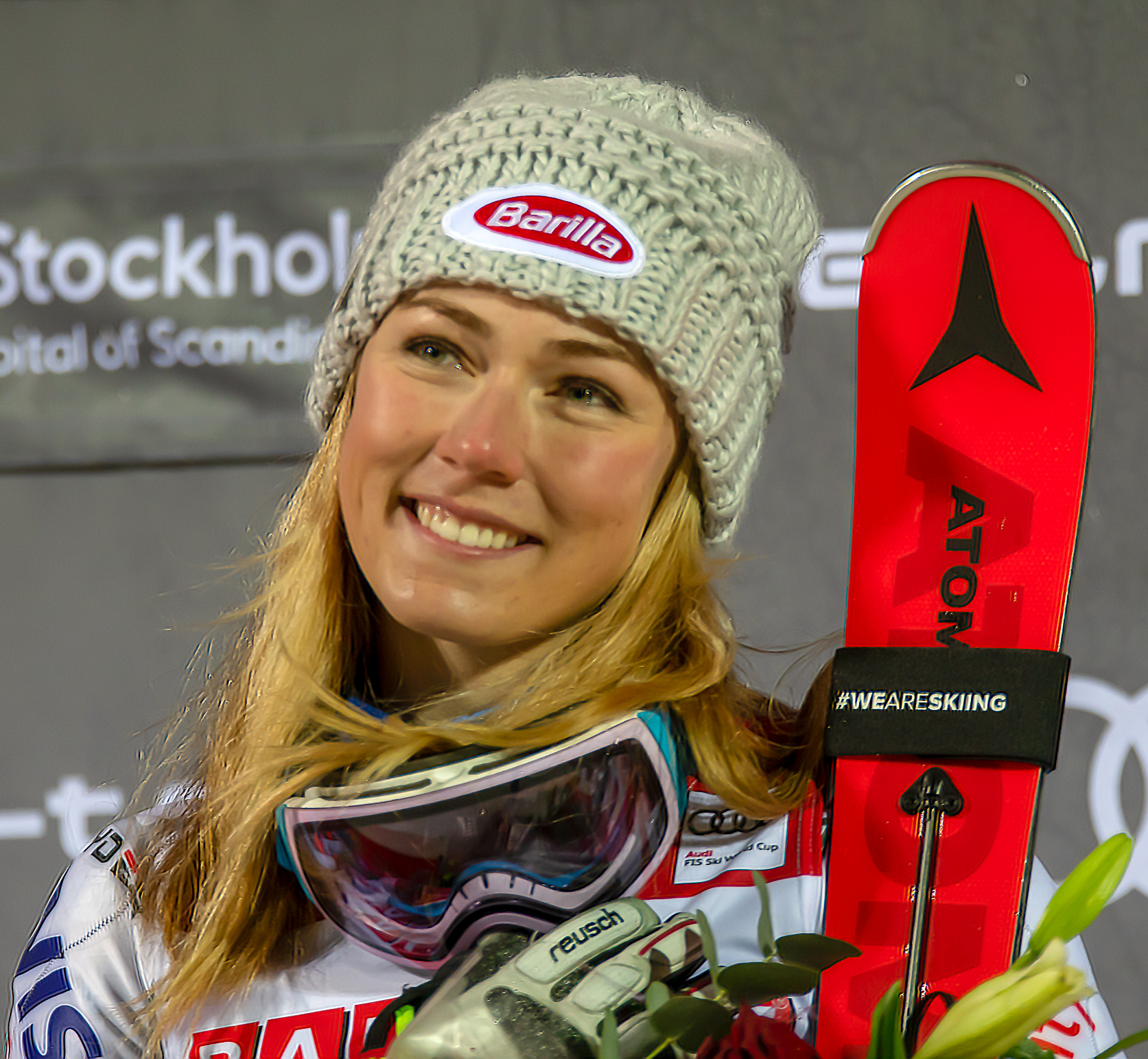
Mikaela Shiffrin has won all four medals (one gold) won by the USA in Cortina 2021, thus bringing her total of medals won at the World Championships to fifteen.

United States competed at the FIS Alpine World Ski Championships 2021 in Cortina d'Ampezzo, United States, from 8 to 21 February 2021.

== Medalists ==
Athlete	Gendre	Event	Medal
Mikaela Shiffrin	Women	Alpine combined	GOLD
Mikaela Shiffrin	Women	Giant slalom	SILVER
Mikaela Shiffrin	Women	Super-G	BRONZE
Mikaela Shiffrin	Women	Slalom	BRONZE
