= L'Éclipse (ski course) =

Ski course in Courchevel, France

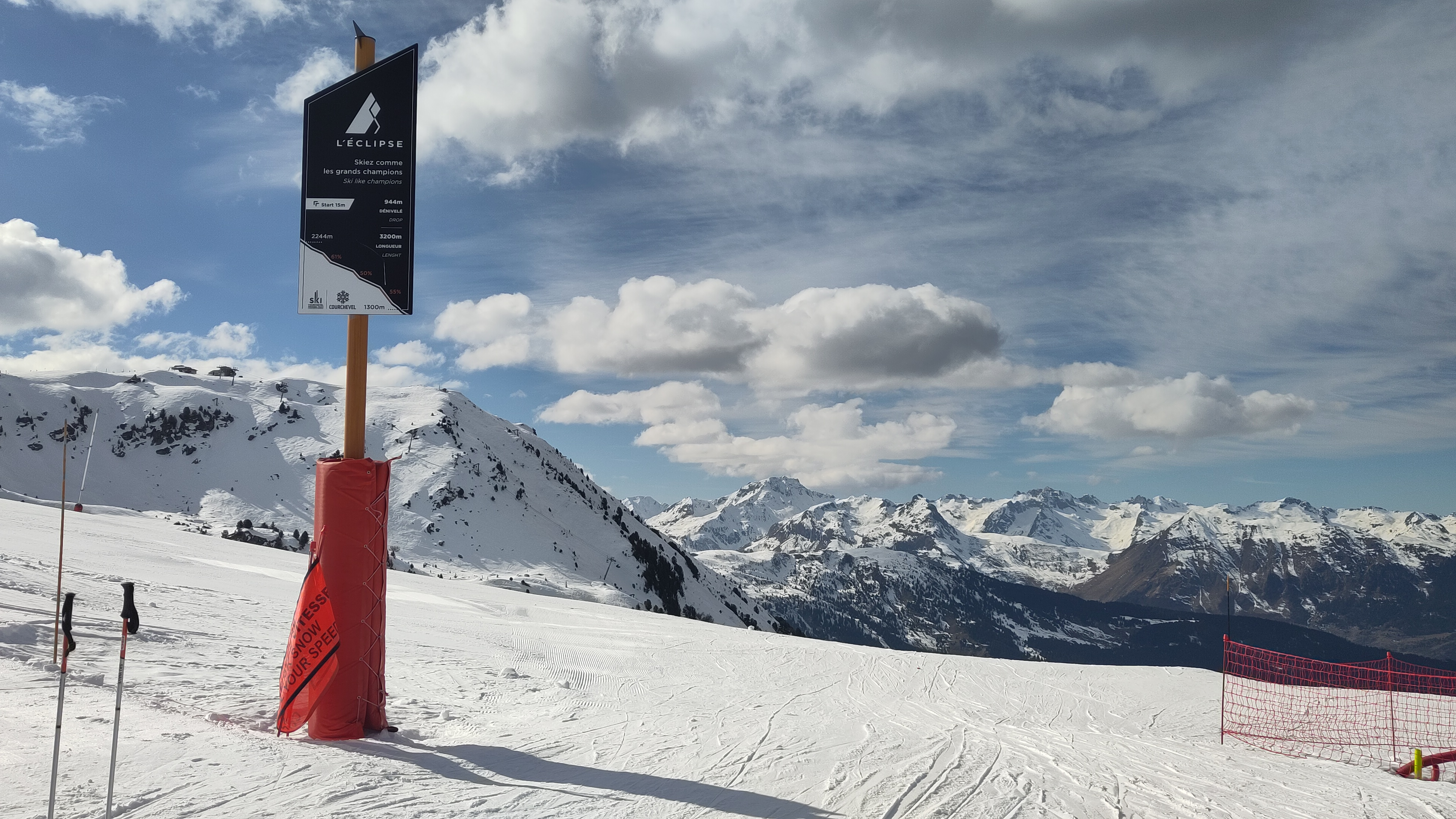
- Start of the course
- Interactive map of L'Éclipse
- Location within France Location within Alps Location within Europe
- 45°25′53″N 6°37′07″E
- Location: Courchevel, France
- Opened: 16 March 2022; 4 years ago
- Architect: Bruno Tuaire, Hannes Trinkl

Downhill
- Start: 2,235 m (7,333 ft) (NGF - IGN69)
- Finish: 1,290 m (4,232 ft)
- Vertical drop: 945 m (3,100 ft)
- Length: 3.100 km (1.93 mi)
- Max incline: 30.1 degrees (58%)
- Avg incline: 16.7 degrees (30%)
- Min incline: 6.3 degrees (11%)

L’Éclipse is a World Cup downhill ski course in Courchevel, France, opened in 2022. Designed by Bruno Tuaire and Hannes Trinkl, it was built for the 2023 World Championships and hosted the five men's events.

In March 2022, it hosted the speed events of the World Cup finals for men and women.

L’Éclipse and the "Roc de Fer" course in nearby Méribel co-hosted the World Championships in 2023.

This black course has a maximum incline of 31.4 degrees (61% gradient) and one of the steepest average inclines in the world with 16.7 degrees (30%), even more than dowhnill in Kitzbühel (27%) or Wengen (26%).

The start begins near Col de la Loze, while the finish area is adjacent to Tremplin du Praz, the ski jumping venue of the 1992 Winter Olympics.

== Course sections ==
- Saut du Zenith
- Mur du Son
- Le S Des Arolles
- Saut Des Jockeys
- Le Trou Noir
- Mur De La Bux
- L'Envol
- Le Mur Des Braves

== History ==
On 16 March 2022, this course originally intended for men only, was officially opened with both men's and women's downhill events of the World Cup season finals, as the upper part of the "Roc de Fer" women's ski course in Méribel wasn't fully rebuilt yet.

Marco Odermatt won the downhill at the 2023 World Championships; the full course was used at 3.100 km (1.93 mi) in length, with a vertical drop of 945 m (3,100 ft) from a starting elevation of 2,235 m (7,333 ft). His winning time of 107.05 seconds yielded an average speed of 104.250 km/h (64.8 mph) and an average vertical descent rate of 8.828 m/s (29.0 ft/s).

== Events ==
=== World Championships ===
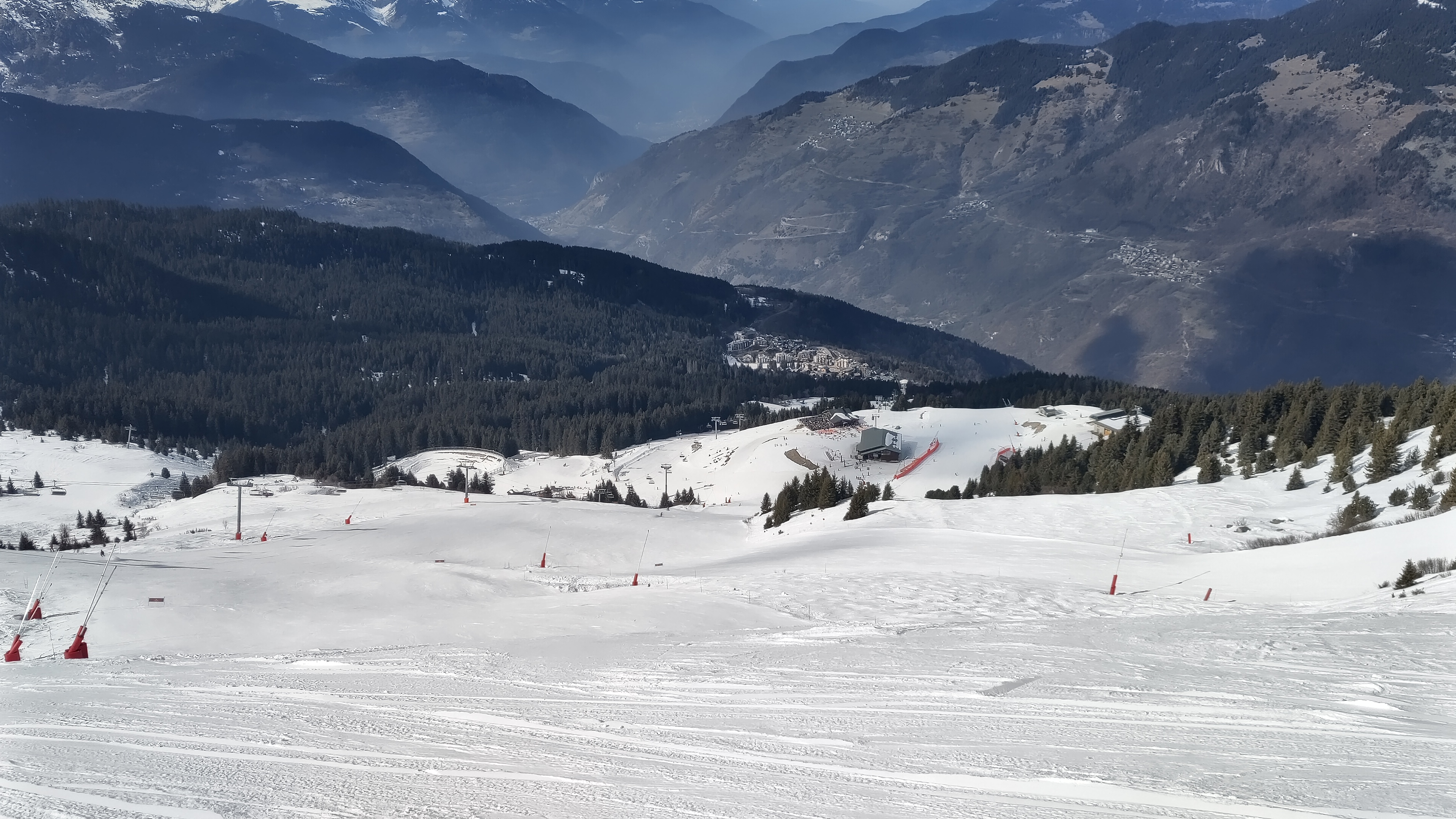
«Mur du son» (1st section)

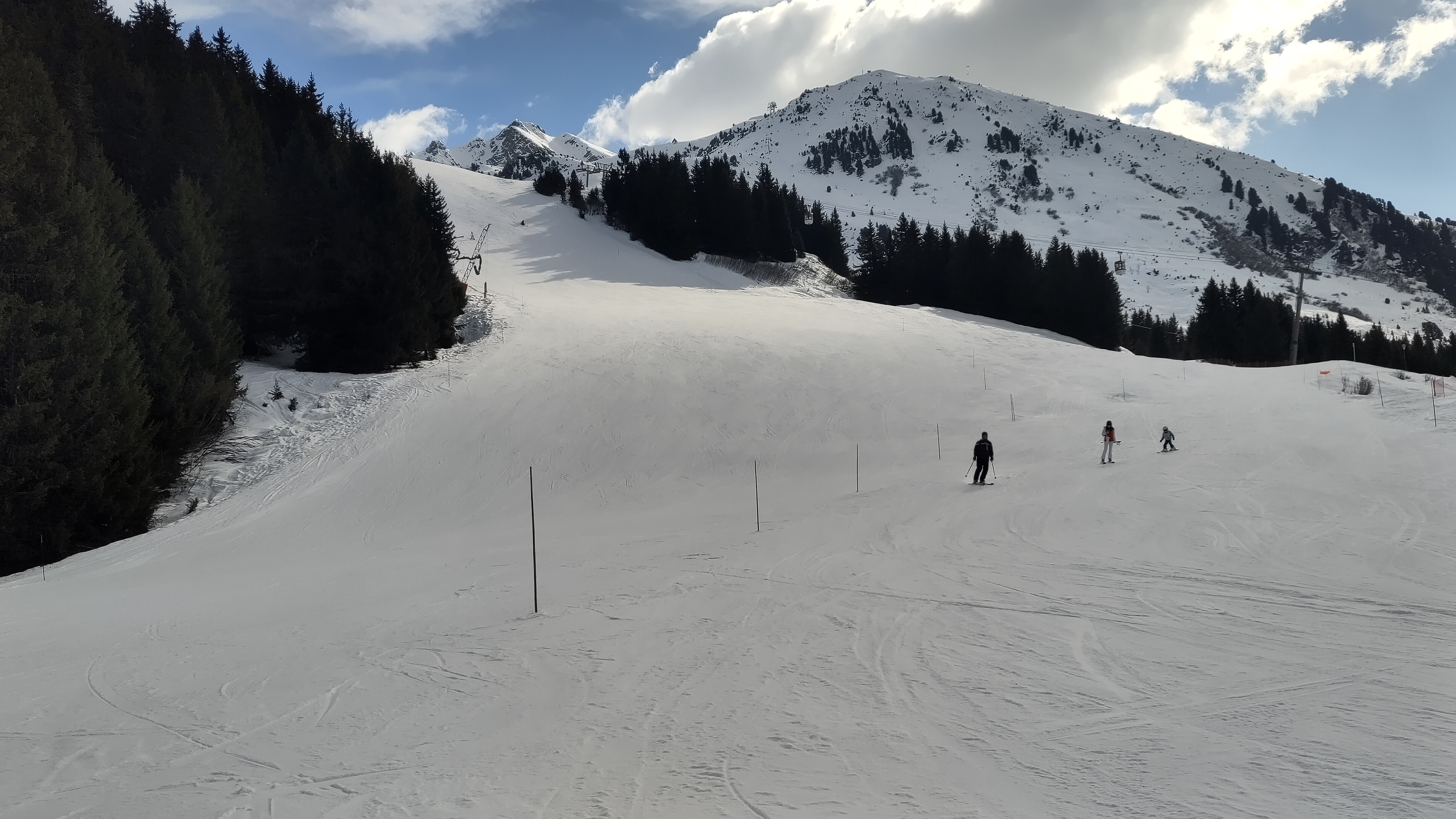
«Mur de la bux» (lower part)

Year	Date	Event	Winner	Second place	Third place
↓ Men ↓
2023	7 February	AC	(France) Alexis Pinturault	(Austria) Marco Schwarz	(Austria) Raphael Haaser
2023	9 February	SG	(Canada) James Crawford	(Norway) Aleksander A. Kilde	(France) Alexis Pinturault
2023	12 February	DH	(Switzerland) Marco Odermatt	(Norway) Aleksander A. Kilde	(Canada) Cameron Alexander
2023	17 February	GS	(Switzerland) Marco Odermatt	(Switzerland) Loïc Meillard	(Austria) Marco Schwarz
2023	19 February	SL	(Norway) Henrik Kristoffersen	(Greece) AJ Ginnis	(Italy) Alex Vinatzer

=== World Cup ===
Season	Date	Event	Winner	Second place	Third place
↓ Women ↓
2021/22	16 March	DH	(United States) Mikaela Shiffrin	(Austria) Christine Scheyer (Switzerland) Joana Hählen	
2021/22	17 March	SG	(Norway) Ragnhild Mowinckel	(United States) Mikaela Shiffrin	(Switzerland) Michelle Gisin
↓ Men ↓
2021/22	16 March	DH	(Austria) Vincent Kriechmayr	(Switzerland) Marco Odermatt	(Switzerland) Beat Feuz
2021/22	17 March	SG	(Austria) Vincent Kriechmayr	(Switzerland) Marco Odermatt	(Switzerland) Gino Caviezel
2025/26	13 March	DH	(Austria) Vincent Kriechmayr	(Italy) Giovanni Franzoni	(Switzerland) Marco Odermatt
2025/26	14 March	SG	replacement for Ga-Pa finally cancelled due to heavy snowfall and fog		
2025/26	15 March	SG	cancelled due to heavy snowfall		

Not in original World Cup calendar. Replacement for Ga-Pa (2026).
