= FIS Alpine World Ski Championships 2023 – Women's alpine combined =

FIS Alpine World Ski Championships 2023 at the Women's alpine combined
- Venue: Roc de Fer
- Location: Méribel, France
- Date: 6 February
- Competitors: 33 from 16 nations
- Winning time: 1:57.47

Medalists
gold medal	Federica Brignone	Italy
silver medal	Wendy Holdener	Switzerland
bronze medal	Ricarda Haaser	Austria

The Women's alpine combined competition at the FIS Alpine World Ski Championships 2023 was held at Roc de Fer ski course in Méribel on 6 February 2023.

== Results ==
The super-G was started at 11:00 and the slalom at 14:30.

Rank	Bib	Name	Country	Super-G	Rank	Slalom	Rank	Total	Diff
1st place, gold medalist(s)	15	Federica Brignone	Italy	1:10.28	1	47.19	2	1:57.47	—
2nd place, silver medalist(s)	7	Wendy Holdener	Switzerland	1:11.94	15	47.15	1	1:59.09	+1.62
3rd place, bronze medalist(s)	30	Ricarda Haaser	Austria	1:11.37	8	48.36	3	1:59.73	+2.26
4	13	Ramona Siebenhofer	Austria	1:11.18	5	48.77	5	1:59.95	+2.48
5	4	Franziska Gritsch	Austria	1:11.35	7	48.83	6	2:00.18	+2.71
6	11	Michelle Gisin	Switzerland	1:11.86	14	49.04	7	2:00.90	+3.43
7	9	Laura Gauché	France	1:11.67	11	49.51	8	2:01.18	+3.71
8	1	Emma Aicher	Germany	1:12.85	23	48.40	4	2:01.25	+3.78
9	19	Elena Curtoni	Italy	1:11.06	4	50.46	11	2:01.52	+4.05
10	23	Marie-Michèle Gagnon	Canada	1:12.14	18	50.24	9	2:02.38	+4.91
11	25	Maryna Gąsienica-Daniel	Poland	1:12.03	17	50.56	12	2:02.59	+5.12
12	26	Priska Nufer	Switzerland	1:12.74	21	50.32	10	2:03.06	+5.59
13	24	Isabella Wright	United States	1:12.84	22	50.84	13	2:03.68	+6.21
14	2	Valérie Grenier	Canada	1:11.55	9	52.55	16	2:04.10	+6.63
15	29	Elvedina Muzaferija	Bosnia and Herzegovina	1:13.14	24	51.92	15	2:05.06	+7.59
16	12	Greta Small	Australia	1:13.89	26	53.43	17	2:07.32	+9.85
17	22	Noa Szőllős	Israel	1:15.81	28	51.64	14	2:07.45	+9.98
18	10	Cande Moreno	Andorra	1:13.26	25	54.24	18	2:07.50	+10.03
	5	Romane Miradoli	France	1:11.95	16	Did not finish			
	14	Mikaela Shiffrin	United States	1:11.24	6	Disqualified			
	16	Ragnhild Mowinckel	Norway	1:10.99	2	Did not start			
	31	Lara Gut-Behrami	Switzerland	1:10.99	2	Did not start			
	18	Ilka Štuhec	Slovenia	1:11.56	10	Did not start			
	32	Tessa Worley	France	1:11.67	11	Did not start			
	21	Alice Robinson	New Zealand	1:11.73	13	Did not start			
	28	Cornelia Hütter	Austria	1:12.16	19	Did not start			
	3	Sofia Goggia	Italy	1:12.20	20	Did not start			
	33	Ania Monica Caill	Romania	1:14.44	27	Did not start			
	6	Marta Bassino	Italy	Did not finish					
	8	Tricia Mangan	United States	Did not finish					
	17	Karen Smadja-Clément	France	Did not finish					
	20	Kajsa Vickhoff Lie	Norway	Did not finish					
	27	Breezy Johnson	United States	Did not finish					
