= Stade Émile-Allais =

Ski course in Courchevel, France

- Interactive map of Stade Émile-Allais
- Location within France Location within Alps Location within Europe
- 45°24′50″N 6°37′41″E
- Location: Courchevel, France
- Mountain: Rocher de la Loze
- Opened: 1979 (men); 2010 (women)

Giant slalom
- Start: 2,175 m (7,136 ft) (AA)
- Finish: 1,815 m (5,955 ft)
- Vertical drop: 360 m (1,181 ft)
- Max incline: 34.3 degrees (58.5%)
- Avg incline: 15.2 degrees (27.2%)
- Min incline: 10.2 degrees (18%)

Slalom
- Start: 2,014 m (6,608 ft) (AA)
- Finish: 1,824 m (5,984 ft)
- Vertical drop: 190 m (623 ft)
- Max incline: 23.7 degrees (44%)
- Avg incline: 20.7 degrees (37.8%)
- Min incline: 10.2 degrees (18%)

Stade Émile-Allais is a women's World Cup technical ski course in Courchevel, France.

== The course ==
This course is part of Les Trois Vallées (The Three Valleys), connecting eight resorts into the largest ski area in the world, with over 600 kilometres (370 miles) of ski slopes. It has regularly hosted women's technical events (slalom, giant slalom) since 2010, and is named after local ski racing legend Émile Allais (1912–2012).

=== Sections ===
- La Haut Du Plantrey
- Le Mur Emile-Allais
- Le Double Roller

== World Cup ==
Mikaela Shiffrin (USA)

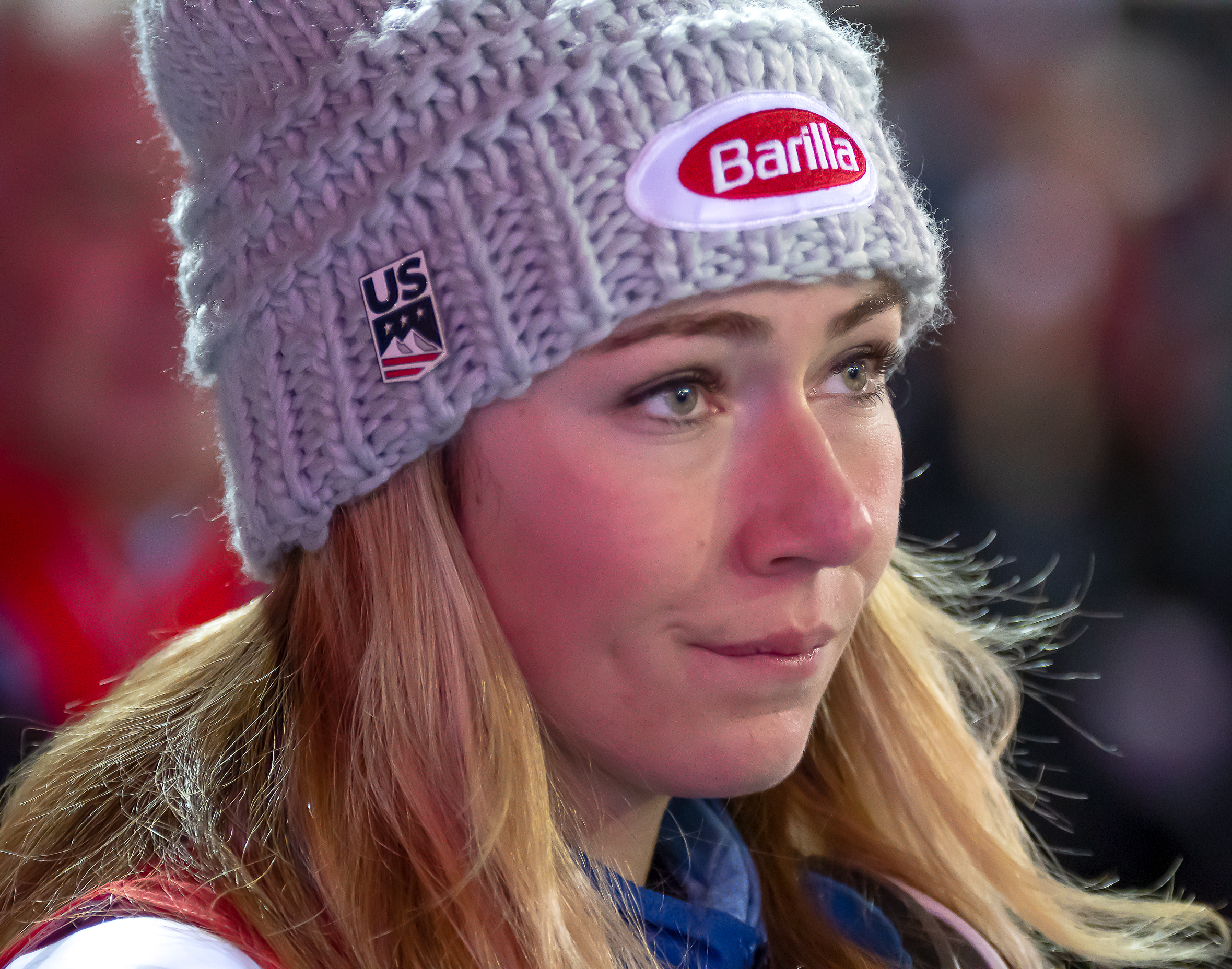
300x

Won record 6 events in total
(4 in GS and 2 in SL both records)

=== Women ===
No.	Type	Season	Date	Winner	Second	Third
1328	SL	2010/11	21 December 2010	(Austria) Marlies Schild	(Finland) Tanja Poutiainen	(Slovenia) Tina Maze
	SL	2011/12	17 December 2011	heavy snow; replaced in Courchevel on 18 December 2011		
	GS	2011/12	18 December 2011	heavy snow; replaced in Soldeu on 10 February 2012		
1358	SL	2011/12	18 December 2011	(Austria) Marlies Schild	(Finland) Tanja Poutiainen	(Austria) Kathrin Zettel
1399	GS	2012/13	16 December 2012	(Slovenia) Tina Maze	(Austria) Kathrin Zettel	(France) Tessa Worley
1433	SL	2013/14	17 December 2013	(Austria) Marlies Schild	(Sweden) Frida Hansdotter	(Austria) Bernadette Schild
	GS	2014/15	13 December 2014	lack of snow; replaced in Åre on 12 December 2014		
	SL	2014/15	14 December 2014	lack of snow; replaced in Åre on 13 December 2014		
1498	GS	2015/16	20 December 2015	(Austria) Eva-Maria Brem	(Switzerland) Lara Gut (Norway) Nina Løseth	
	GS	2016/17	20 December 2016	excessive wind after race started; replaced in Semmering on 27 December 2016		
1574	GS	2017/18	19 December 2017	(United States) Mikaela Shiffrin	(France) Tessa Worley	(Italy) Manuela Mölgg
1575	PS	2017/18	20 December 2017	(United States) Mikaela Shiffrin	(Slovakia) Petra Vlhová	(Italy) Irene Curtoni
1613	GS	2018/19	21 December 2018	(United States) Mikaela Shiffrin	(Germany) Viktoria Rebensburg	(France) Tessa Worley
1614	SL	2018/19	22 December 2018	(United States) Mikaela Shiffrin	(Slovakia) Petra Vlhová	(Sweden) Frida Hansdotter
1646	GS	2019/20	17 December 2019	(Italy) Federica Brignone	(Norway) Mina Fürst Holtmann	(Switzerland) Wendy Holdener
1671	GS	2020/21	12 December 2020	(Italy) Marta Bassino	(Sweden) Sara Hector	(Slovakia) Petra Vlhová
1672	GS	2020/21	14 December 2020	(United States) Mikaela Shiffrin	(Italy) Federica Brignone	(France) Tessa Worley
1710	GS	2021/22	21 December 2021	(United States) Mikaela Shiffrin	(Sweden) Sara Hector	(Switzerland) Michelle Gisin
1711	GS	2021/22	22 December 2021	(Sweden) Sara Hector	(United States) Mikaela Shiffrin	(Italy) Marta Bassino
1784	SL	2023/24	21 December 2023	(Slovakia) Petra Vlhová	(United States) Mikaela Shiffrin	(Austria) Katharina Truppe
1832	SL	2024/25	30 January 2025	(Croatia) Zrinka Ljutić	(Sweden) Sara Hector	(Germany) Lena Dürr
1856	SL	2025/26	16 December 2025	(United States) Mikaela Shiffrin	(Switzerland) Camille Rast	(Germany) Emma Aicher

Not in original World Cup calendar; replaced Killington (2021).

=== Men ===
No.	Type	Season	Date	Winner	Second	Third
294	GS	1978/79	7 January 1979	(Sweden) Ingemar Stenmark	(Switzerland) Peter Lüscher	(Socialist Federal Republic of Yugoslavia) Bojan Križaj
