= Superstar (ski course) =

World Cup ski course in Killington, Vermont

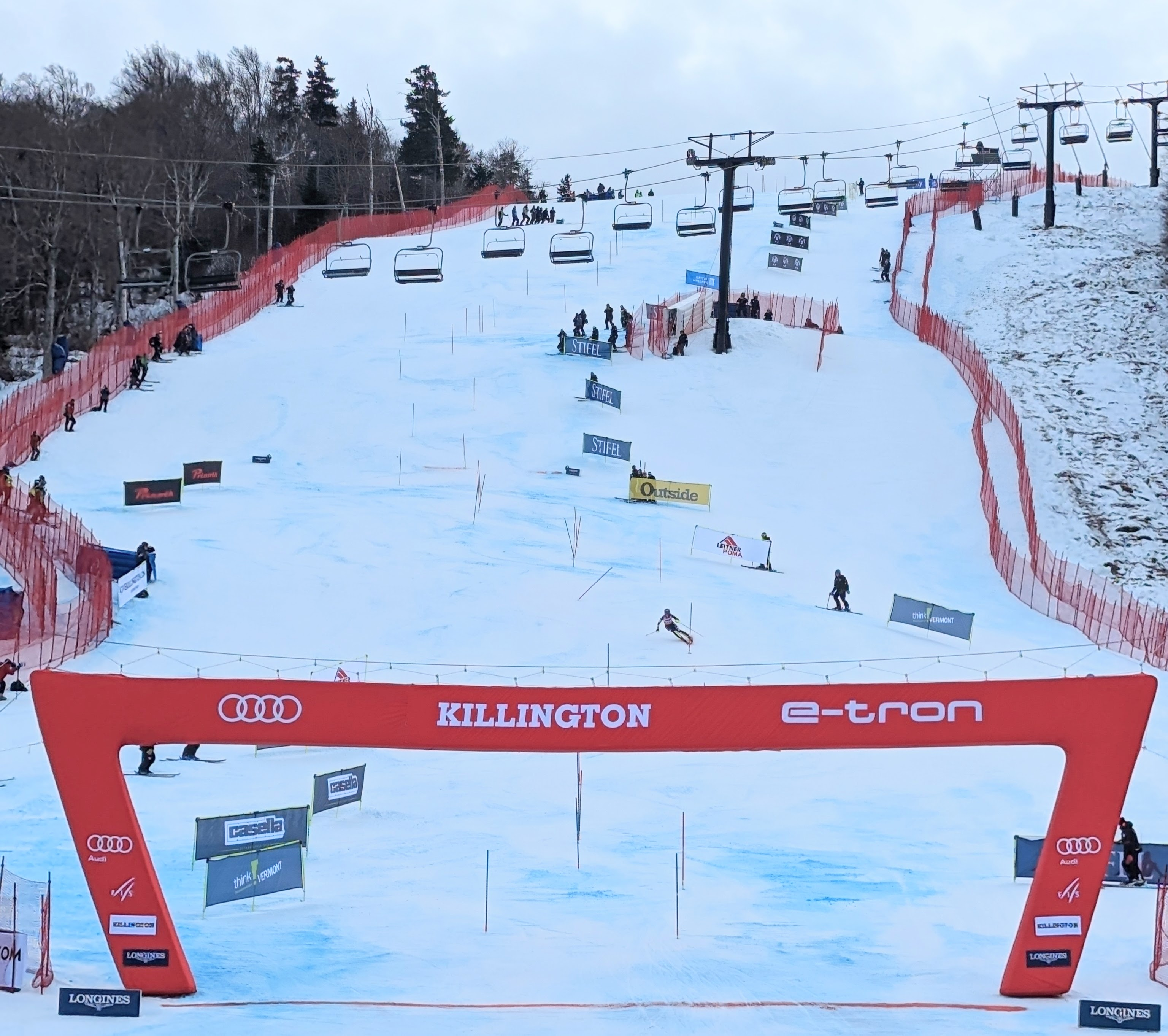
- Interactive map of Superstar
- Location in the United States Location in Vermont
- 43°36′58″N 72°48′11″W
- Location: Killington, Vermont, United States
- Mountain: Skye Peak
- Resort: Killington Ski Resort
- Opened: 2016 (race course); 10 years ago
- Level: advanced

Giant slalom
- Start: 3,701 ft (1,128 m) AMSL
- Finish: 2,585 ft (788 m)
- Vertical drop: 1,120 ft (340 m)

Slalom
- Start: 3,241 ft (988 m) AMSL
- Finish: 2,585 ft (788 m)
- Vertical drop: 656 ft (200 m)
- Most Wins (W): (United States) Mikaela Shiffrin (6x)

Superstar is a World Cup ski piste in the northeast United States at Killington, Vermont.

Located on Skye Peak mountain of the Killington Ski Resort, the course is open to the public as a black diamond trail. It has hosted eleven women's World Cup events (45th of all-time), the sixth most in the U.S. The race course debuted in November 2016, succeeding Aspen, Colorado, as the early season U.S. host for women's technical events (slalom and giant slalom).

Giant slalom course has maximum incline at 62%, average incline at 39% and minimum incline at 24%.

Slalom course has maximum incline at 58%, average incline at 41% and minimum incline at 19%.

== World Cup ==
The course has hosted the FIS Alpine Ski World Cup since 2016, replacing Aspen, Colorado, as the early season U.S. venue for women's slalom and giant slalom events. This was the first World Cup event in the northeast since 1991 at Waterville Valley, New Hampshire; and the first in Vermont since 1978 at Stratton Mountain. Unlike the lightly attended World Cup events in the North American West, Killington is a very popular stop, with over 30,000 people attending. Since the course's debut, American Mikaela Shiffrin came in first for five slalom events.

=== Course sections ===
As a race course, Superstar is comparable to most classic European venues.

- Upper Headwall
- Launch Pad
- Upper Field
- Lower Field High Road
- Upper Preston's Pitch
- Lower Preston's Pitch

Mikaela Shiffrin (USA)	Lower Preston's Pitch
300x	300x
Won the first five slaloms; and record six slaloms in total	View from the finish area

=== Women's events ===
No.	Type	Season	Date	Winner	Second	Third	Ref.
1529	GS	2016/17	26 November 2016	(France) Tessa Worley	(Norway) Nina Løseth	(Italy) Sofia Goggia	
1530	SL	2016/17	27 November 2016	(United States) Mikaela Shiffrin	(Slovakia) Veronika Velez-Zuzulová	(Switzerland) Wendy Holdener	
1566	GS	2017/18	25 November 2017	(Germany) Viktoria Rebensburg	(United States) Mikaela Shiffrin	(Italy) Manuela Mölgg	
1567	SL	2017/18	26 November 2017	(United States) Mikaela Shiffrin	(Slovakia) Petra Vlhová	(Austria) Bernadette Schild	
1604	GS	2018/19	24 November 2018	(Italy) Federica Brignone	(Norway) Ragnhild Mowinckel	(Austria) Stephanie Brunner	
1605	SL	2018/19	25 November 2018	(United States) Mikaela Shiffrin	(Slovakia) Petra Vlhová	(Sweden) Frida Hansdotter	
1639	GS	2019/20	30 November 2019	(Italy) Marta Bassino	(Italy) Federica Brignone	(United States) Mikaela Shiffrin	
1640	SL	2019/20	1 December 2019	(United States) Mikaela Shiffrin	(Slovakia) Petra Vlhová	(Sweden) Anna Swenn-Larsson	
	GS	2020/21	28 November 2020	North American Tour cancelled before the season; due to the COVID-19 pandemic			
	SL	2020/21	29 November 2020	North American Tour cancelled before the season; due to the COVID-19 pandemic			
	GS	2021/22	27 November 2021	cancelled after 9 racers, strong wind; replaced in Courchevel on 22 December 2021			
1702	SL	2021/22	28 November 2021	(United States) Mikaela Shiffrin	(Slovakia) Petra Vlhová	(Switzerland) Wendy Holdener	
1737	GS	2022/23	26 November 2022	(Switzerland) Lara Gut-Behrami	(Italy) Marta Bassino	(Sweden) Sara Hector	
1738	SL	2022/23	27 November 2022	(Switzerland) Wendy Holdener (Sweden) Anna Swenn-Larsson		(Austria) Katharina Truppe	
1776	GS	2023/24	25 November 2023	(Switzerland) Lara Gut-Behrami	(New Zealand) Alice Robinson	(United States) Mikaela Shiffrin	
1777	SL	2023/24	26 November 2023	(United States) Mikaela Shiffrin	(Slovakia) Petra Vlhová	(Switzerland) Wendy Holdener	
1815	GS	2024/25	30 November 2024	(Sweden) Sara Hector	(Croatia) Zrinka Ljutić	(Switzerland) Camille Rast	
1816	SL	2024/25	1 December 2024	(Switzerland) Camille Rast	(Sweden) Anna Swenn-Larsson (Switzerland) Wendy Holdener		

== Trail ==
The course is situated on a black diamond trail of the same name, consisting of three separate sections: headwall, middle, and lower, moguls line the side of the trail. It is known for enabling one of the longest ski/snowboard seasons in North America, relying on ambitious snowmaking efforts.
