= Mikaela Shiffrin =

American alpine skier (born 1995)

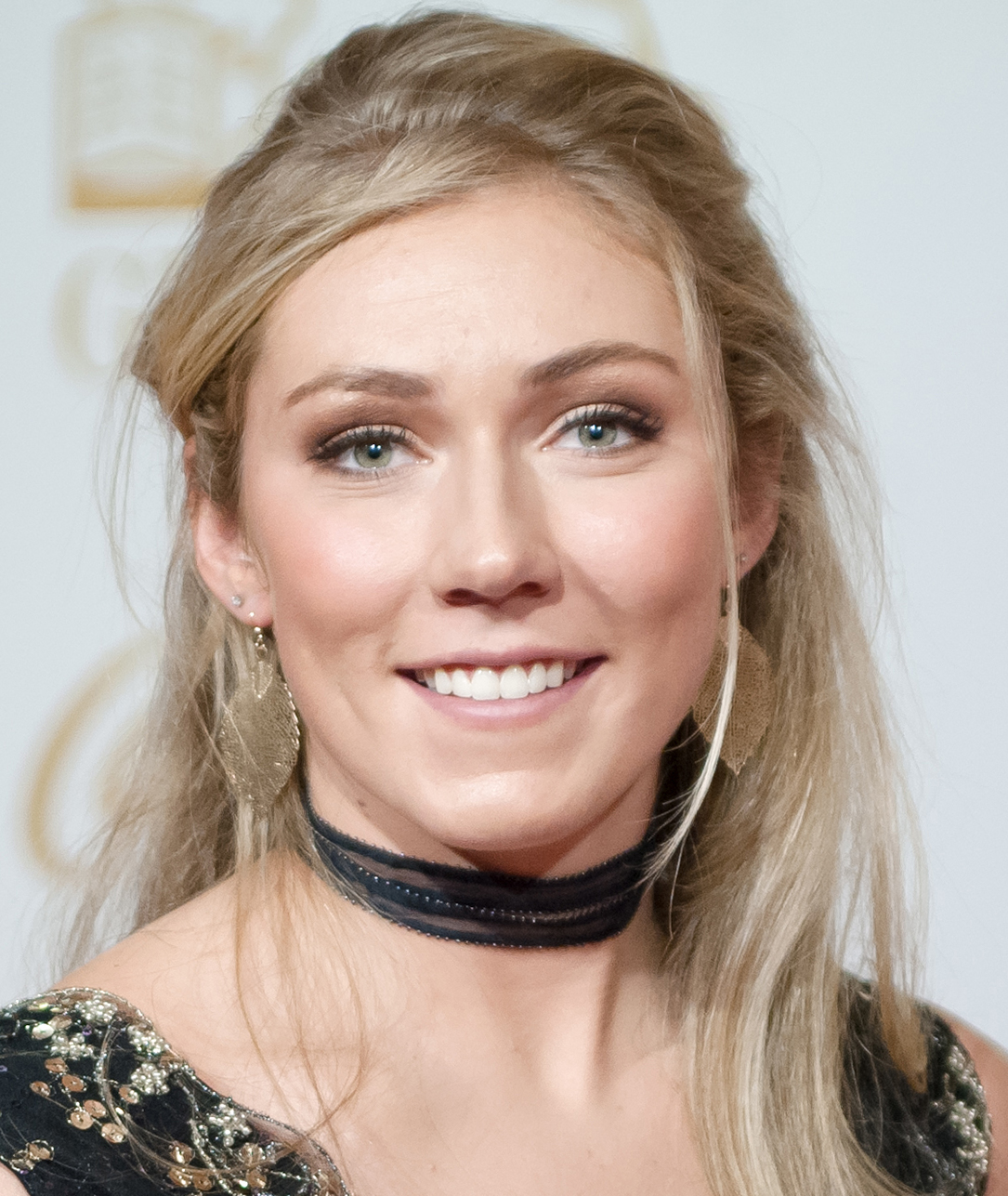
- Shiffrin in October 2016

Personal information
- Born: Mikaela Pauline Shiffrin; March 13, 1995 (age 31) Vail, Colorado, U.S.
- Height: 5 ft 7 in (170 cm)

Skiing career
- Country: United States
- Sport: Alpine skiing
- Club: Burke Mountain Academy
- Disciplines: Slalom, Giant slalom, Super-G, Downhill, Combined
- World Cup debut: March 11, 2011 (age 15)

Olympics
- Teams: 4 – (2014, 2018, 2022, 2026)
- Medals: 4 (3 gold)

World Championships
- Teams: 7 – (2013–2025)
- Medals: 15 (8 gold)

World Cup
- Seasons: 17 – (2011–2027)
- Wins: 110 – (73 SL, 22 GS, 5 SG, 4 DH, 1 AC, 3 CE, 2 PSL)
- Podiums: 168 – (99 SL, 44 GS, 10 SG, 7 DH, 1 AC, 5 CE, 2 PSL)
- Overall titles: 6 – (2017, 2018, 2019, 2022, 2023, 2026)
- Discipline titles: 12 – (SL – 2013, 2014, 2015, 2017, 2018, 2019, 2023, 2024, 2026; GS – 2019, 2023; SG – 2019)
Medal record
Women's alpine skiing
Representing the United States
World Cup race podiums
Event	1st	2nd	3rd
Slalom	73	16	10
Giant slalom	22	8	14
Downhill	4	1	2
Super-G	5	2	3
Combined	1	0	0
Parallel	5	1	1
Total	110	28	30
International competitions
Event	1st	2nd	3rd
Olympic Games	3	1	0
World Championships	8	4	3
World Junior Championships	0	0	1
Total	11	5	4
Olympic Games
Gold medal – first place	2014 Sochi	Slalom
Gold medal – first place	2018 Pyeongchang	Giant slalom
Gold medal – first place	2026 Milano Cortina	Slalom
Silver medal – second place	2018 Pyeongchang	Combined
World Championships
Gold medal – first place	2013 Schladming	Slalom
Gold medal – first place	2015 Beaver Creek	Slalom
Gold medal – first place	2017 St. Moritz	Slalom
Gold medal – first place	2019 Åre	Slalom
Gold medal – first place	2019 Åre	Super-G
Gold medal – first place	2021 Cortina d'Ampezzo	Combined
Gold medal – first place	2023 Méribel	Giant slalom
Gold medal – first place	2025 Saalbach	Team combined
Silver medal – second place	2017 St. Moritz	Giant slalom
Silver medal – second place	2021 Cortina d'Ampezzo	Giant slalom
Silver medal – second place	2023 Méribel	Slalom
Silver medal – second place	2023 Méribel	Super-G
Bronze medal – third place	2019 Åre	Giant slalom
Bronze medal – third place	2021 Cortina d'Ampezzo	Super-G
Bronze medal – third place	2021 Cortina d'Ampezzo	Slalom
World Junior Championships
Bronze medal – third place	2011 Crans-Montana	Slalom

Mikaela Pauline Shiffrin (born March 13, 1995) is an American alpine skier. Shiffrin is the most decorated American alpine skier in World Championships history. She has the most World Cup wins of any alpine skier in history (men or women) and is the only one to have reached the milestone of 100 victories. She is a three-time Olympic gold medalist, four-time Olympic medalist, an eight-time World Championships gold medalist (including four titles in slalom), a six-time overall World Cup champion, and a nine-time winner of the World Cup slalom discipline title. Shiffrin, at 18 years and 345 days, became the youngest slalom gold medalist in Olympic history in 2014.

Shiffrin won her eighth career Alpine world championships gold medal on February 11, 2025, taking her overall tally to 15 medals from 18 career world championship races, and making Shiffrin the most successful skier in the modern era. She was named one of the 100 most influential people in the world by Time magazine in 2023.

== Early life ==
Born in Vail, Colorado, Shiffrin is the second child of Eileen (née Condron) and Jeff Shiffrin, both originally from the Northeastern United States and former ski racers; her mother became a nationally prominent masters racer. Her paternal grandfather was Jewish. Shiffrin's father Jeff grew up in New Jersey and was an avid skier on weekends in Vermont with his family. As an undergraduate, he raced for Dartmouth College in New Hampshire. Her mother Eileen raced in high school in northwestern Massachusetts in the Berkshires, and her brother Taylor (born 1992) raced for the University of Denver.

When Mikaela was eight in 2003, the family moved to rural New Hampshire near Lyme, where her father, an anesthesiologist, worked at Dartmouth–Hitchcock Medical Center. After five years, he took a new job in Denver; Shiffrin's older brother Taylor was in high school at Burke Mountain Academy, a ski academy in northeastern Vermont, and stayed in the east. Shiffrin also attended middle school at Burke but went with her parents to Colorado before returning to Burke.

From a young age, Mikaela had strong results in major competitions. In March 2010, at age 14, she won both the slalom and giant slalom (GS) at the Topolino Games in Italy, against skiers from 40 nations. The following winter, now meeting the FIS minimum age requirement of 15 years, she won a Nor-Am Cup super combined race in December 2010 at Panorama, British Columbia, only the eighth FIS-level race in which she had competed. Shiffrin followed it up with three podiums in her next three Nor-Am races: runner-up in a super-G, third in a GS, and victory in a slalom. Weeks later, she won a pair of Nor-Am slalom races held at Sunday River, Maine. A month later, Shiffrin took the slalom bronze medal at the FIS Junior World Ski Championships held at Crans-Montana, Switzerland (after having been down with a stomach virus the day before).

== Personal life ==
In February 2020, her father unexpectedly died in an accident. Since 2021, Shiffrin has been in a relationship with the Norwegian World Cup alpine ski racer Aleksander Aamodt Kilde. On April 4, 2024, the couple announced their engagement.

In May 2025, Shiffrin joined the ownership group for National Women's Soccer League expansion club Denver Summit FC. In June 2025, she received an honorary Doctor of Humane Letters degree from Dartmouth College.

== Ski racing career ==
Shiffrin made her World Cup debut on March 11, 2011, in giant slalom at Špindlerův Mlýn in the Czech Republic. In early April, just a few weeks after her 16th birthday, she won the slalom title at the US National Championships at Winter Park, Colorado, and became the youngest American ski racer to claim a national alpine crown.

=== 2012 season ===
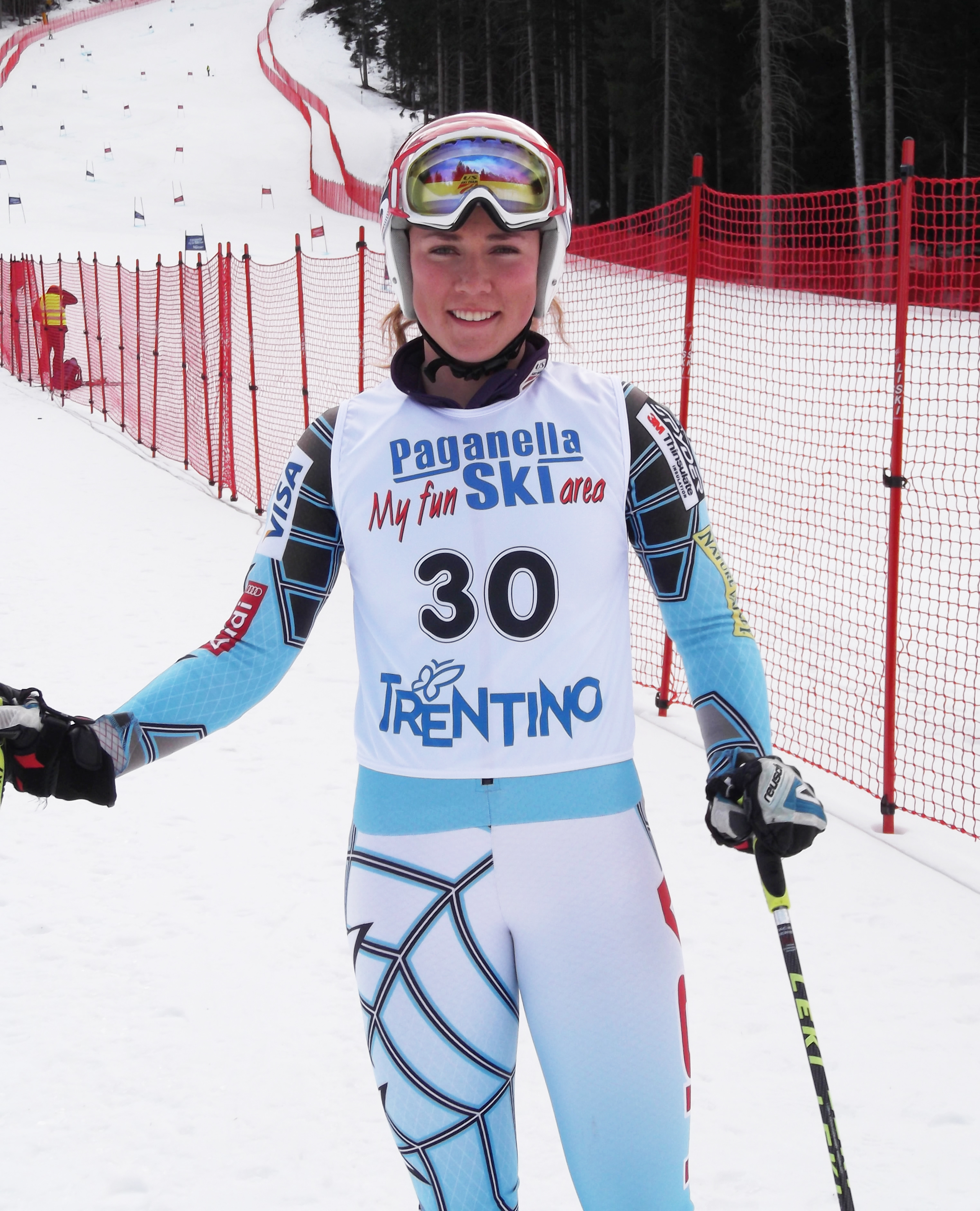
Shiffrin in 2012

During the 2012 Alpine Skiing World Cup, Shiffrin, age 16, took her first World Cup podium on December 29, 2011, at a slalom in Lienz, Austria. She started 40th, lost her left shin guard halfway down, but finished in 12th place in the first run. Shiffrin then posted the fastest time in the second run to secure third place.

=== 2013 season ===
Shiffrin won her first World Cup race in December 2012 at age 17, in a night slalom in Åre, Sweden. She became the second-youngest American to win an alpine World Cup event, behind Judy Nagel (17 yr, 5 mo.). Shiffrin's second win came two weeks later at a night slalom at Zagreb, Croatia, and her third win 11 days later at another night slalom in Flachau, Austria. After winning the slalom at the World Cup finals in Lenzerheide, she secured the 2013 season title in the slalom discipline. Though she spent most of her last two years of high school in Europe on the World Cup circuit, she graduated on time from Burke Mountain Academy in June.

=== 2014 season ===
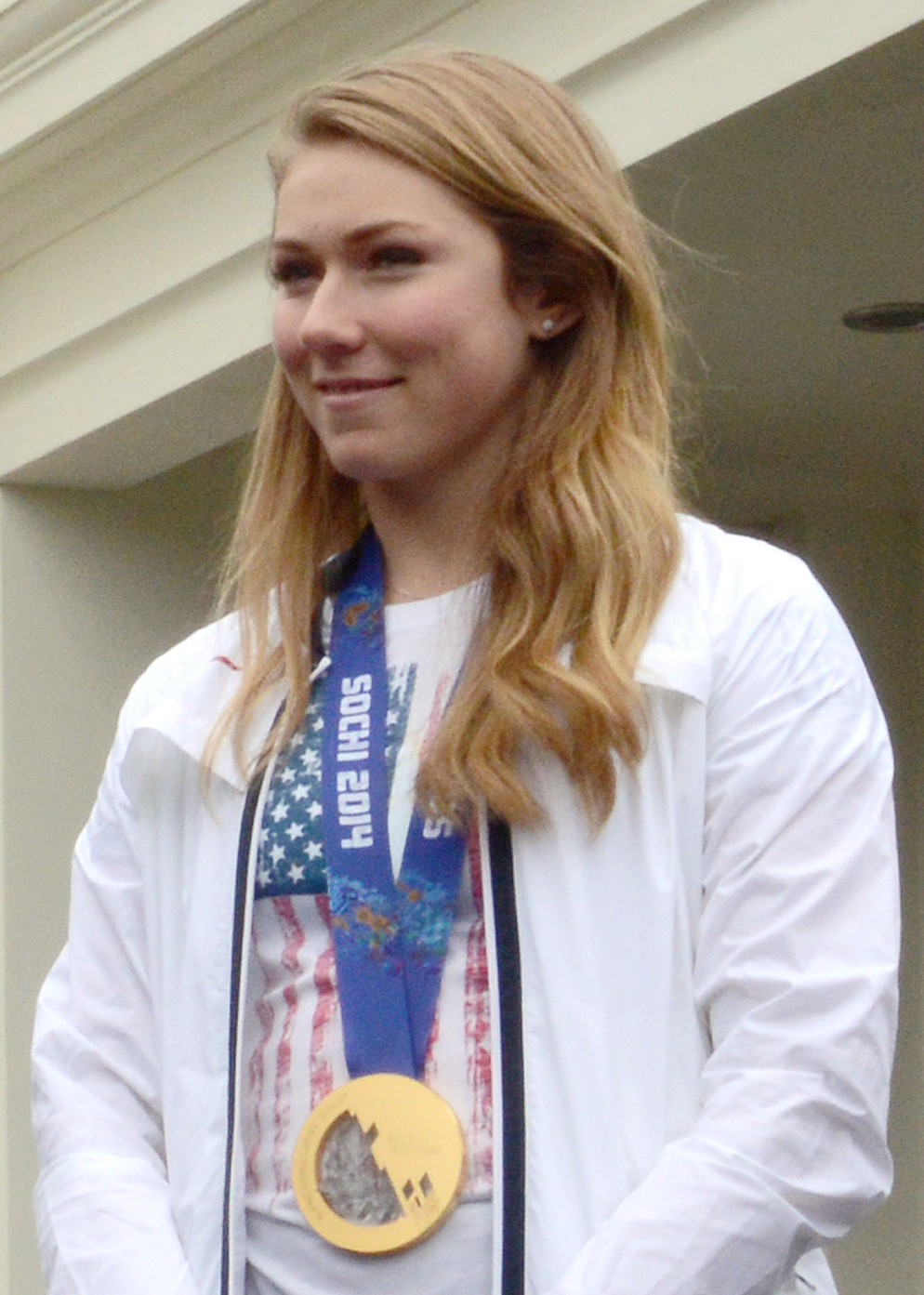
Shiffrin with her slalom gold medal from the 2014 Winter Olympics

Shiffrin opened the 2014 season in October 2013 in Sölden, Austria, with a career-best sixth in giant slalom, within a half-second of the podium. She won the next event, a slalom at Levi, Finland, improving on her podium finish the previous year for her fifth World Cup victory. At Beaver Creek, she was runner-up in the giant slalom, her first World Cup podium in that discipline. On January 5, Shiffrin secured first place in a two-run slalom race in Bormio, Italy (the race took place there instead of in Zagreb, as scheduled, due to bad snow/weather conditions). She also won the world cup slalom races in Flachau, Åre, and Lenzerheide to secure a second consecutive World Cup slalom title. On February 21, she won slalom at the Sochi Olympics, becoming the youngest winner of that Olympic event. Shiffrin ended the season as the reigning Olympic, World Cup, and world champion in slalom. That year, she was named one of ESPNW's Impact 25.

=== 2015 season ===
Shiffrin opened the 2015 season in October 2014 in Sölden with her first World Cup win in giant slalom. She had some trouble with slalom at first and ended up outside the podium in the first three World Cup slalom races, but emerged victorious in the races at Kühtai, Zagreb, Maribor, Åre and Méribel. She ended up winning the slalom world cup title once again. Shiffrin also won the World Championship in slalom held in Beaver Creek next to her home city of Vail, Colorado, U.S.

=== 2016 season ===
In the first two slalom races of the 2016 season, both in Aspen, Shiffrin won by large margins, and in her first race, she achieved a new record margin for women's slalom, 3.07 seconds over the runner-up. On December 12, 2015, during the warm-up for the giant slalom in Åre, she fell and injured her knee. After two months away from racing, Shiffrin made a successful return in her first race back on February 15, 2016, where she took her 18th victory in Crans-Montana. In the 2016 season, she won all five slaloms she started. She missed the other five slaloms due to injuries and chose not to compete in parallel slalom in Stockholm.

=== 2017 season ===
Shiffrin opened the 2017 season with a second-place finish in giant slalom at Sölden in October 2016. This was followed by a victory in slalom at Levi on November 12. On November 26, 2016, she finished fifth in giant slalom at Killington in her first World Cup race in Vermont, but she returned the following day to a first-place finish in the slalom. On December 11, 2016, Shiffrin won her 11th straight World Cup in the slalom in Sestriere, Italy. On December 27, Shiffrin won the giant slalom in Semmering, Austria, her second career giant slalom win and her first solo giant slalom win. The next day, she repeated and won her third career giant slalom and 25th World cup career victory. Shiffrin subsequently won the final race held at Semmering, a slalom, on December 29, 2016, achieving her 26th World cup victory and completing her sweep of races at the resort. This made her the first woman to take three wins in three consecutive days in technical disciplines since Vreni Schneider won two giant slaloms in Schwarzenberg and a slalom in Mellau in January 1989. However she missed out on equalling the record of eight consecutive slalom wins, jointly held by Schneider and Janica Kostelić when she failed to finish the first run of the Snow Queen Trophy race in Zagreb on January 3 – her first DNF in slalom since a race in Semmering in 2012. On January 29 in Cortina d'Ampezzo, Italy, Shiffrin posted her best result in a speed event, finishing fourth in the super-G, only 0.03 seconds off the podium. She won her first parallel slalom on January 31 in Stockholm, Sweden.

At the World Championships in St. Moritz in February, she won the gold medal in slalom and took the silver in giant slalom. The gold was her third consecutive in slalom at the World Championships; she became the first woman to do this in the World Cup era and the first since Germany's Christl Cranz in 1939 when the Worlds were held annually.

On February 26, Shiffrin won her first super combined race at Crans-Montana. In Squaw Valley, the first World Cup races there since 1969, she won the giant slalom on March 10 and the slalom the following day, taking her to 31 World Cup victories and 11 for the season. This secured her fourth slalom world cup. In Aspen, Colorado, the World Cup finals of the season took place. Shiffrin secured her first overall World Cup but did not win the giant slalom World Cup that year. She finished the season with more World Cup victories before the age of 22 than Ingemar Stenmark, the record holder for number of World Cup victories. After the season, she received the "Skieur d'Or" (golden skier) award, given by the international ski journalist association to the best alpine skier of the year (one award for both genders).

=== 2018 season ===
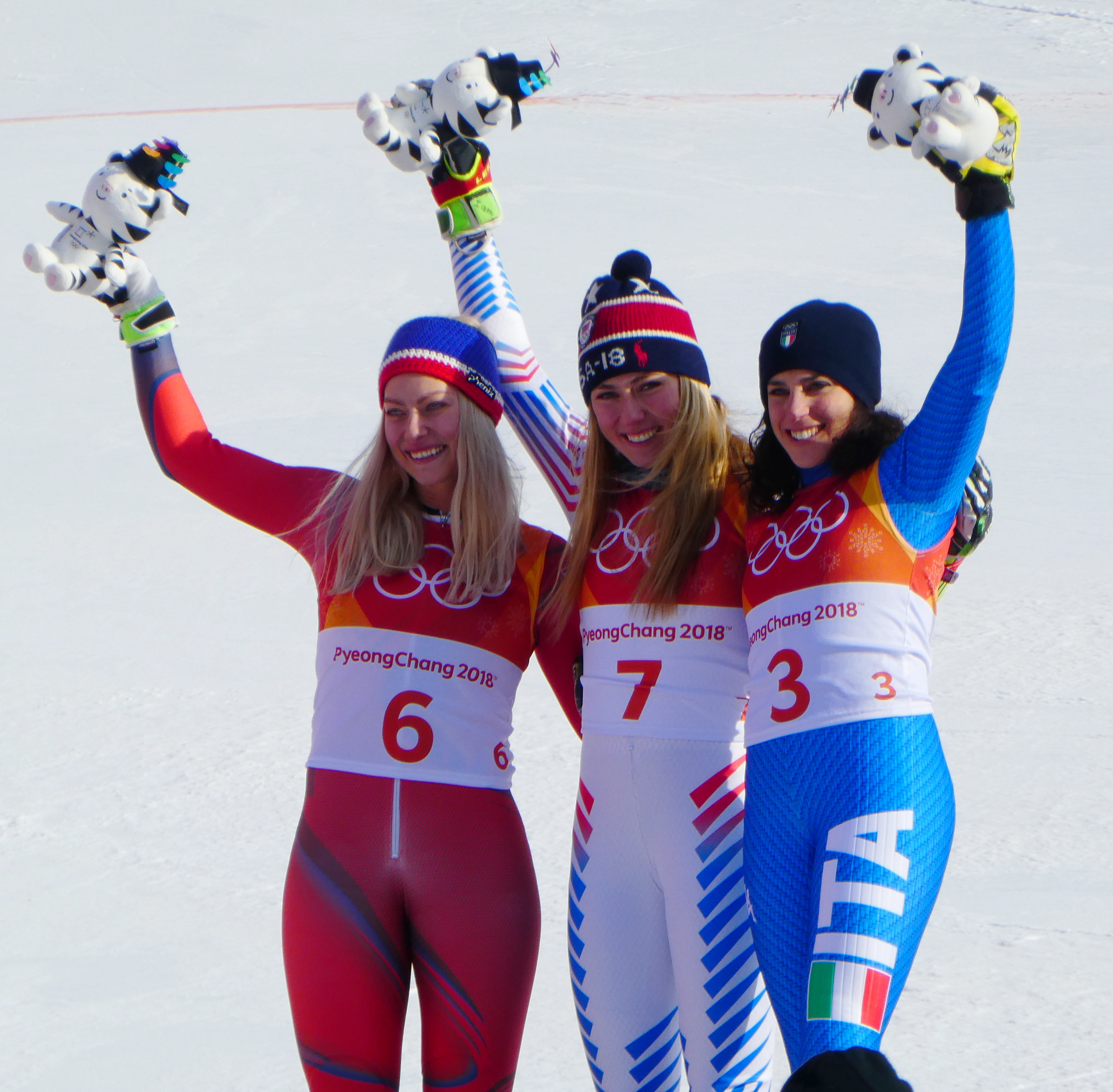
Giant slalom, Pyeongchang 2018: Ragnhild Mowinckel (silver), Shiffrin (gold) and Federica Brignone (bronze)

In January, with wins in both the giant slalom and slalom at Kranjska Gora, Slovenia, Shiffrin clocked up her 39th, and 40th World Cup wins at age 22. She then tied the record of 41 World Cup wins before a 23rd birthday. She also became the first woman in history to win the first 5 World Cup races of a calendar year.

At the 2018 Winter Olympics, in Pyeongchang, South Korea, Shiffrin won gold in giant slalom as well as silver in combined.

Shiffrin secured her second consecutive World Cup overall title on March 9, 2018, with 5 races left in the season.

=== 2019 season ===
On December 2, 2018, she won a super-G race in Lake Louise, becoming the only alpine skier ever — male or female — to win all six currently contested alpine skiing disciplines. These include slalom, giant slalom, downhill, super-G, combined, and parallel slalom.

On December 8, 2018, she won her second Super-G at St. Moritz, Switzerland, for her first back-to-back speed wins. The next day, December 9, she won her 4th parallel slalom with a dramatic win over her main slalom rival, the Slovak Petra Vlhová. This marked her 5th win out of 9 season races to start the 2018–2019 season. On December 22, 2018, she won the slalom in Courchevel, France, and became the youngest skier, female or male, to win 50 World Cup ski races at 23 years and nine months. With that race, she also equaled the record of the Austrian Marlies Schild for the most wins in women's slalom – 35.

One week later, she took another World Cup slalom win in Semmering, Austria, becoming the first alpine skier to take 15 World Cup wins in a single calendar year, moving ahead of Marcel Hirscher, who had taken 14 wins in 2018: both had broken the old record of 13 wins which had been set by Ingemar Stenmark in 1979. The race was also her 36th World Cup slalom win, breaking Schild's record: Shiffrin subsequently described Schild as "my biggest idol beside Bode Miller".

At the start of February 2019, shortly before the 2019 Alpine World Ski Championships, Shiffrin moved into third place on the list of female skiers with the most World Cup race wins at a meeting in Maribor, tying with Vlhová for the win in giant slalom to put her equal with Vreni Schneider on 55 wins before winning a slalom the following day to overtake the Swiss skier.

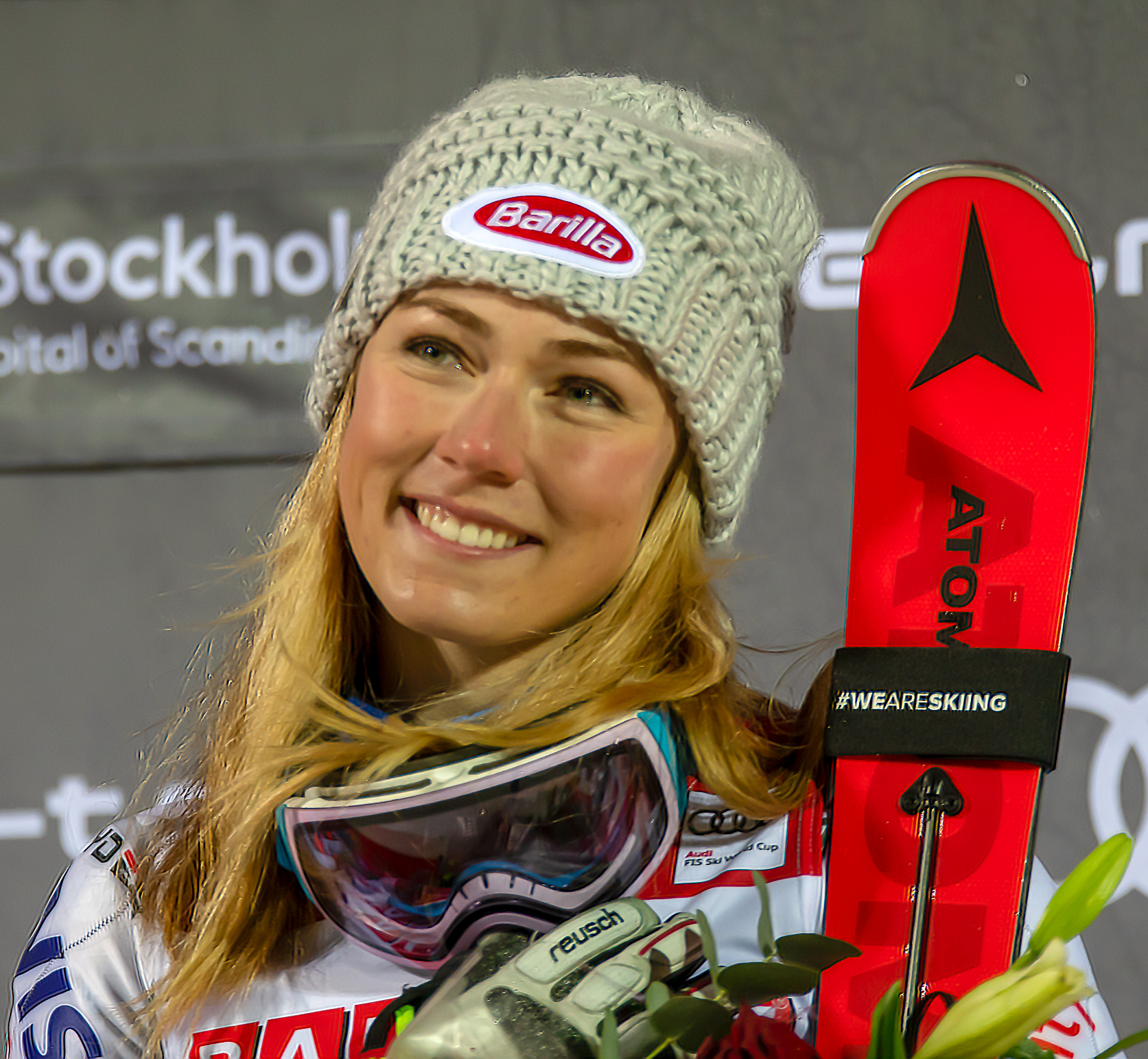
Shiffrin at the podium ceremony in Stockholm 2019 after winning her 14th race of the season, equalling Vreni Schneider's record. She advanced the record to 17 by the end of the season.

At the World Championships, Shiffrin won the gold medal in the super-G before taking a bronze in the giant slalom in windy, changeable conditions, finishing behind Vlhová and Viktoria Rebensburg. She went on to secure a second gold in the slalom, becoming the first alpine skier to win four consecutive World Championships in the same discipline, despite suffering from a lung infection on the day of the race.

Following the Worlds, in March 2019, Shiffrin became the first alpine skier to take 15 World Cup wins in a season when she took victory in slalom in Špindlerův Mlýn, breaking the record she had previously held jointly with Vreni Schneider. At the World Cup finals in Soldeu, Shiffrin started her campaign by clinching the super-G crystal globe, finishing fourth in the final race to take her tenth World Cup title and her first in a speed discipline, having already built an unassailable lead to secure the overall and slalom titles earlier in the season. She became the first skier to win World Cups in a technical and a speed event in the same season since Tina Maze six years earlier. She went on to win the slalom, her 16th win of the season and the 40th slalom win of her career, tying with Stenmark for the most World Cup slalom race wins. The following day she took her 17th win of the season and the 60th win of her career in the giant slalom to secure the GS crystal globe, becoming the first skier to win the overall, super-G, giant slalom and slalom World Cup titles in a single season. She also later won her 41st slalom race, making her the skier who has won the most World Cup slalom races.

=== 2020 season ===
Shiffrin had inconsistent performances in the technical races in the first half of the 2020 season, winning three slalom races to start but placing runner-up to Petra Vlhova later in the season. She also experienced similar fluctuations in ranking in giant slalom. She competed more frequently in speed races and, following the Bansko World Cup in January 2020, had recorded 6 victories for the season, 3 slaloms and one each in giant slalom, super-G, and downhill, off pace with her performance in previous seasons, but still the most on the World Cup tour and with a considerable lead in the Overall Standings.

On February 2, 2020, her father unexpectedly died in an accident, causing her to take a break from competition until late in the year.

=== 2021 season ===
Shiffrin missed the first race weekend of the season in Sölden due to a back issue, but returned to racing in the first of the two slalom races at Levi, where she placed second.

At the 2021 World Championships in Cortina d'Ampezzo, Shiffrin emerged on top form, performing perhaps even better than expected and winning four medals, the most she has won in a single World Championship event. Her bronze medal run in the super-G was her first time competing in a speed event in over a year, as she had opted not to return to speed events this season due to her wanting to ensure that the return to racing would not be too heavy as well as the COVID-19 pandemic keeping her apart from the speed team and training. This feat was made more impressive by the fact that she had only trained Super-G for four days going into the competition. Her gold medal in the Alpine Combined made her the most decorated American alpine skier in the World Championships history – with her sixth gold and ninth medal she surpassed the record five WCH gold medals won by Ted Ligety, as well as the record of eight WCH medals in total held by Lindsey Vonn.

=== 2022 season ===
At the 2022 Winter Olympics, Shiffrin was favored to win gold in at least three of the six events she was planning to compete in (especially her signature slalom and giant slalom). However, she uncharacteristically had a Did Not Finish (DNF) in the giant slalom and slalom, skiing out after the fifth gate in the first run of each race. She finished ninth in the super-G. In the remaining individual events (downhill and combined), Shiffrin did not win a medal. She competed in the mixed team event for the first time on the last day of competition, finishing fourth as part of the U.S. team.

=== 2023 season ===
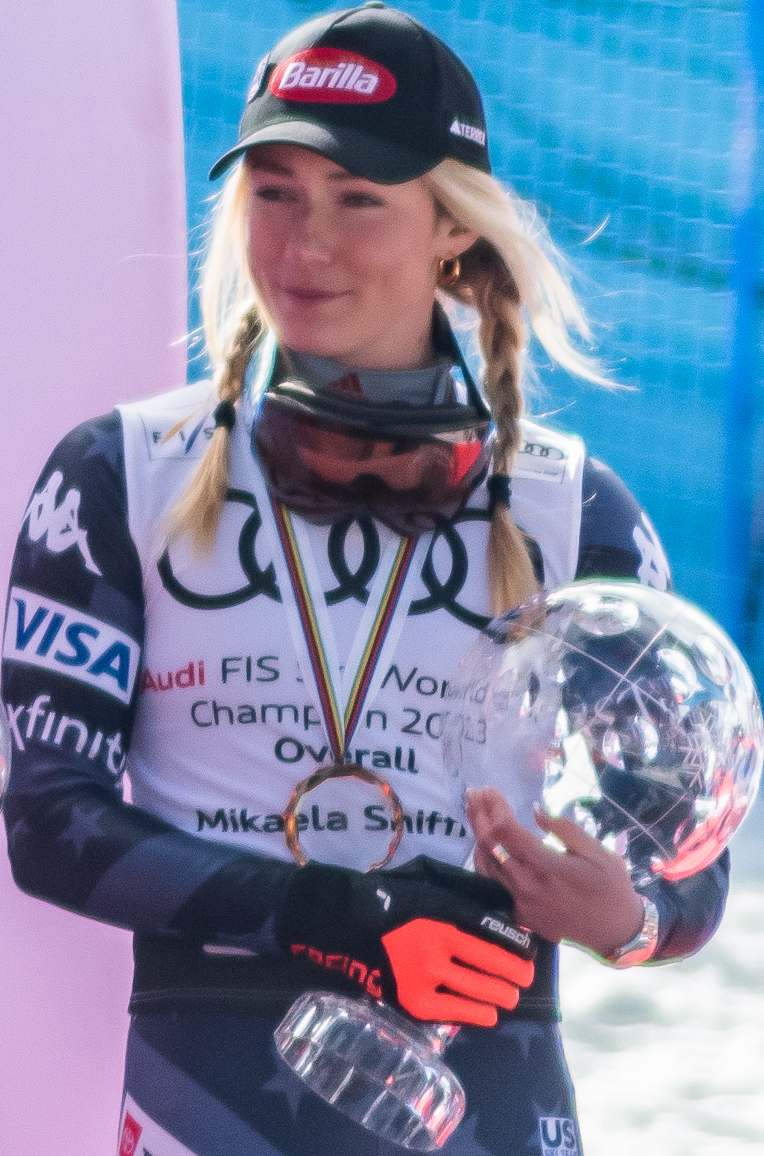
Shiffrin, as the 2023 overall World Cup champion, with her crystal globe

In the World Championships she won a gold medal in giant slalom, and medals in super-G and slalom.

In March 2023, Shiffrin won her 87th World Cup race, overtaking Ingemar Stenmark (86) for the most World Cup wins by any alpine skier. In an interview on 27 February 2023, Stenmark hailed Shiffrin: "She's much better than I was. You cannot compare... I could never have been so good in all disciplines".

She won an 88th World Cup race, the overall, the giant slalom and slalom season titles.

Her performances during the 2023 season earned her a nomination for the Laureus World Sports Award for Sportswoman of the Year. Shiffrin is the recipient of the 2023 Best Female Athlete ESPY Award.

=== 2024 season ===
Shiffrin injured her left leg and ligaments in a crash in Cortina d’Ampezzo, Italy in late January. She was out of racing for six weeks to rehabilitate, winning two World Cup slalom races after her return, making it 97.

=== 2025 season ===
On November 30, 2024, at the FIS World Cup race in Killington, Vermont, Shiffrin sustained a puncture wound to her right abdomen following a crash in the giant slalom, where she tumbled into two gates and hit the catch-fencing. She was cleared of major injuries afterwards. On January 30, 2025, in her comeback race after her injuries had healed, she finished tenth in the slalom event at Courchevel.

Alongside Breezy Johnson, she won gold in the inaugural team combined at the World Championships in Saalbach-Hinterglemm. It was her 15th world championship medal, which equalled the record of Christl Cranz.

In a slalom at Sestriere on February 23, Shiffrin achieved a first for her sport, earning her 100th World Cup victory. She added another victory at the season finals in Sun Valley, Idaho, winning the slalom on 27 March 2025. Despite missing four of the ten events, she was fourth in the slalom standings, with four victories and an additional podium.

=== 2026 season ===
On November 15, 2025 Shiffrin won the first slalom race of the season in Levi, Finland. Her winning margin over second place Lara Colturi was 1.66 seconds. It was her 65th WC-slalom win and her 102nd overall WC-win.

On November 23, 2025 she won the second slalom race in Gurgl, Austria. Her winning margin over second place Lara Colturi was 1.23 seconds. It was her 66th slalom win and her 103rd overall WC-win.

On November 30, 2025 she won the third slalom race in Copper Mountain, U.S.. Her winning margin over second place Lena Dürr was 1.57 seconds. It was her 67th slalom win and her 104th overall WC-win.

On December 16, 2025 Shiffrin won the fourth slalom race in Courchevel, France, her first win there since 2018. Her winning margin over second place Camille Rast was 1.55 seconds. It was her 68th slalom win and her 105th overall WC-win.

As of December 16, 2025, Mikaela Shiffrin has won five World Cup slalom races in a row overall – that includes the four slalom victories she’s had so far this 2025–26 season (Levi, Gurgl, Copper Mountain, Courchevel) plus the final slalom race from last season on 27 March 2025 in Sun Valley, Idaho.

After failing to win a medal in the other disciplines at the Milan-Cortina Olympics, she triumphed in the slalom event, finishing 1.50 seconds ahead of second-place Camille Rast. This victory marked her second gold medal in an Olympic slalom and her third overall at the Olympic Games. She thus became the first person to repeat her first Olympic victory twelve years later, as well as the first American skier to win two Olympic slalom gold medals, and both the oldest and the youngest American woman to win Olympic alpine gold, having done so at age 18 and age 30. She is tied with Julia Mancuso for winning the most Olympic medals as an American woman in alpine skiing, with four.

== Statistics ==
By winning her second Olympic gold medal in the 2018 giant slalom, Shiffrin tied Ted Ligety and Andrea Mead Lawrence for the most Olympic gold medals ever won by an American Olympian in alpine skiing. She is one of only five Americans to win the World Cup overall title. In World Championships, she is the most decorated American alpine skier in history, having won the most medals (14) overall, a record seven of them gold.

Shiffrin is the first and only athlete with wins in all seven FIS Alpine Ski World Cup disciplines: slalom, parallel slalom, giant slalom, super-G, downhill, alpine combined and city event. She is the youngest skier to win 50 World Cup races, doing so at the age of 23 years and 9 months. She is also the only skier, male or female, to reach 100 World Cup victories.

As of March 25, 2026, Shiffrin has won 110 World Cup races. She overtook Ingemar Stenmark for the most World Cup wins by any alpine skier in 2023 with her 87th win.

Shiffrin holds the record of most World Cup podiums, with 168. In the 2019 season, she set the record and became the first athlete to win 17 World Cup races during a season. By winning the gold medal in the slalom at the 2019 World Championships, she became the first athlete to win the world championship in the same discipline at four consecutive championships. Shiffrin holds the overall record of winning gold medals at seven world championships (all consecutively). Shiffrin is the first skier to win 100 World Cups.

== World Cup results ==
=== Season titles ===
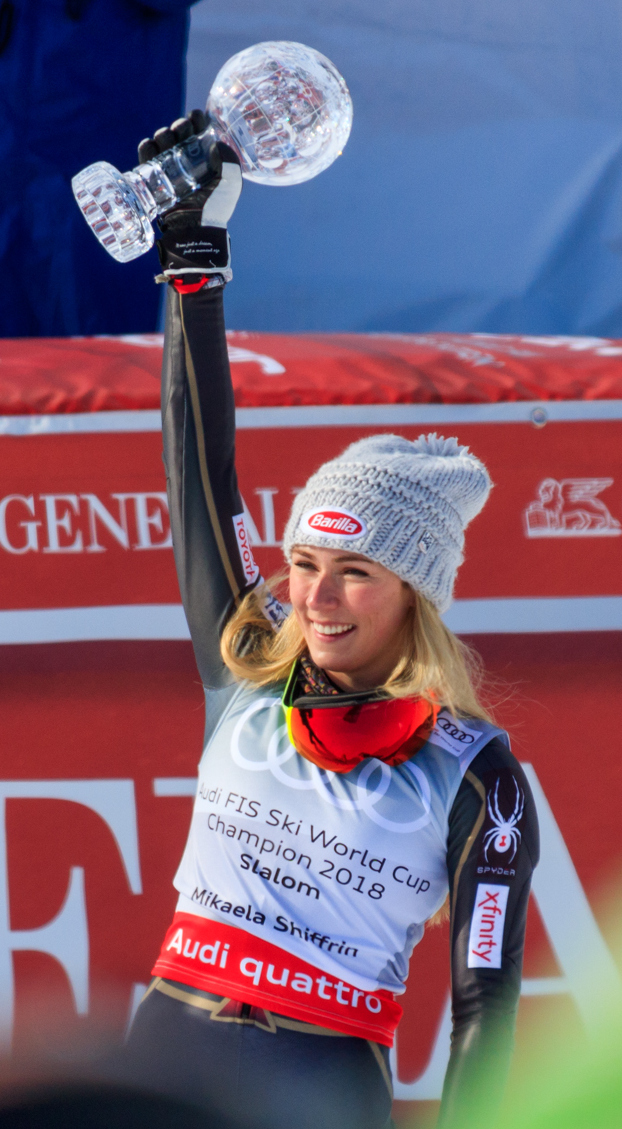
Shiffrin in Åre 2018

- 18 titles – (6 Overall, 9 Slalom, 2 Giant slalom, 1 Super-G)

Season	
Season	Discipline
2013	Slalom
2014	Slalom
2015	Slalom
2017	Overall
2017	Slalom
2018	Overall
2018	Slalom
2019	Overall
2019	Slalom
2019	Giant slalom
2019	Super-G
2022	Overall
2023	Overall
2023	Slalom
2023	Giant slalom
2024
2024	Slalom
2026
2026	Overall
2026	Slalom

=== Season standings ===
Season
Season	Age	Overall	Slalom	Giant slalom	Super-G	Downhill	Combined	Parallel
2012	16	43	17	49	—	—	—	—N/a
2013	17	5	1st place, gold medalist(s)	19	—	—	—	—N/a
2014	18	6	1st place, gold medalist(s)	7	—	—	—	—N/a
2015	19	4	1st place, gold medalist(s)	3rd place, bronze medalist(s)	—	—	—	—N/a
2016	20	10	4	21	39	—	23	—N/a
2017	21	1st place, gold medalist(s)	1st place, gold medalist(s)	2nd place, silver medalist(s)	24	36	6	—N/a
2018	22	1st place, gold medalist(s)	1st place, gold medalist(s)	3rd place, bronze medalist(s)	28	5	—	—N/a
2019	23	1st place, gold medalist(s)	1st place, gold medalist(s)	1st place, gold medalist(s)	1st place, gold medalist(s)	25	—	—N/a
2020	24	2nd place, silver medalist(s)	2nd place, silver medalist(s)	3rd place, bronze medalist(s)	7	5	—	20
2021	25	4	2nd place, silver medalist(s)	2nd place, silver medalist(s)	—	—	—N/a	—
2022	26	1st place, gold medalist(s)	2nd place, silver medalist(s)	3rd place, bronze medalist(s)	3rd place, bronze medalist(s)	26	—N/a	—
2023	27	1st place, gold medalist(s)	1st place, gold medalist(s)	1st place, gold medalist(s)	7	12	—N/a	—N/a
2024	28	3rd place, bronze medalist(s)	1st place, gold medalist(s)	5	29	20	—N/a	—N/a
2025	29	16	4	30	—	—	—N/a	—N/a
2026	30	1st place, gold medalist(s)	1st place, gold medalist(s)	4	45	—	—N/a	—N/a
2027	31	7	—	7	—	—	—N/a	—N/a

Standings through October 26, 2026

=== Race victories ===
	Total	Slalom	Giant slalom	Downhill	Super-G	Combined	Parallel
Wins	110	73	22	4	5	1	5
Podiums	168	99	44	7	10	1	7

Updated through March 25, 2026

Season
Season	Date	Location	Discipline
2013; 4 victories (4 SL)	December 20, 2012	Åre, Sweden	Slalom
2013; 4 victories (4 SL)	January 4, 2013	Zagreb, Croatia	Slalom
2013; 4 victories (4 SL)	January 15, 2013	Flachau, Austria	Slalom
2013; 4 victories (4 SL)	March 16, 2013	Lenzerheide, Switzerland	Slalom
2014; 5 victories (5 SL)	November 16, 2013	Levi, Finland	Slalom
2014; 5 victories (5 SL)	January 5, 2014	Bormio, Italy	Slalom
2014; 5 victories (5 SL)	January 14, 2014	Flachau, Austria	Slalom
2014; 5 victories (5 SL)	March 8, 2014	Åre, Sweden	Slalom
2014; 5 victories (5 SL)	March 15, 2014	Lenzerheide, Switzerland	Slalom
2015; 6 victories (5 SL, 1 GS)	October 25, 2014	Sölden, Austria	Giant slalom
2015; 6 victories (5 SL, 1 GS)	December 29, 2014	Kühtai, Austria	Slalom
2015; 6 victories (5 SL, 1 GS)	January 4, 2015	Zagreb, Croatia	Slalom
2015; 6 victories (5 SL, 1 GS)	February 22, 2015	Maribor, Slovenia	Slalom
2015; 6 victories (5 SL, 1 GS)	March 14, 2015	Åre, Sweden	Slalom
2015; 6 victories (5 SL, 1 GS)	March 21, 2015	Méribel, France	Slalom
2016; 5 victories (5 SL)	November 28, 2015	(United States) Aspen, U.S.	Slalom
2016; 5 victories (5 SL)	November 29, 2015	(United States) Aspen, U.S.	Slalom
2016; 5 victories (5 SL)	February 15, 2016	Crans-Montana, Switzerland	Slalom
2016; 5 victories (5 SL)	March 6, 2016	Jasná, Slovakia	Slalom
2016; 5 victories (5 SL)	March 19, 2016	St. Moritz, Switzerland	Slalom
2017; 11 victories (6 SL, 3 GS, 1 AC, 1 CE)	November 12, 2016	Levi, Finland	Slalom
2017; 11 victories (6 SL, 3 GS, 1 AC, 1 CE)	November 27, 2016	(United States) Killington, U.S.	Slalom
2017; 11 victories (6 SL, 3 GS, 1 AC, 1 CE)	December 11, 2016	Sestriere, Italy	Slalom
2017; 11 victories (6 SL, 3 GS, 1 AC, 1 CE)	December 27, 2016	Semmering, Austria	Giant slalom
2017; 11 victories (6 SL, 3 GS, 1 AC, 1 CE)	December 28, 2016	Semmering, Austria	Giant slalom
2017; 11 victories (6 SL, 3 GS, 1 AC, 1 CE)	December 29, 2016	Semmering, Austria	Slalom
2017; 11 victories (6 SL, 3 GS, 1 AC, 1 CE)	January 8, 2017	Maribor, Slovenia	Slalom
2017; 11 victories (6 SL, 3 GS, 1 AC, 1 CE)	January 31, 2017	Stockholm, Sweden	City event
2017; 11 victories (6 SL, 3 GS, 1 AC, 1 CE)	February 26, 2017	Crans-Montana, Switzerland	Combined
2017; 11 victories (6 SL, 3 GS, 1 AC, 1 CE)	March 10, 2017	(United States) Squaw Valley, U.S.	Giant slalom
2017; 11 victories (6 SL, 3 GS, 1 AC, 1 CE)	March 11, 2017	(United States) Squaw Valley, U.S.	Slalom
2018; 12 victories (7 SL, 1 DH, 2 GS, 1 PS; 1 CE)	November 26, 2017	(United States) Killington, U.S.	Slalom
2018; 12 victories (7 SL, 1 DH, 2 GS, 1 PS; 1 CE)	December 2, 2017	Lake Louise, Canada	Downhill
2018; 12 victories (7 SL, 1 DH, 2 GS, 1 PS; 1 CE)	December 19, 2017	Courchevel, France	Giant slalom
2018; 12 victories (7 SL, 1 DH, 2 GS, 1 PS; 1 CE)	December 20, 2017	Courchevel, France	Parallel slalom
2018; 12 victories (7 SL, 1 DH, 2 GS, 1 PS; 1 CE)	December 28, 2017	Lienz, Austria	Slalom
2018; 12 victories (7 SL, 1 DH, 2 GS, 1 PS; 1 CE)	January 1, 2018	Oslo, Norway	City event
2018; 12 victories (7 SL, 1 DH, 2 GS, 1 PS; 1 CE)	January 3, 2018	Zagreb, Croatia	Slalom
2018; 12 victories (7 SL, 1 DH, 2 GS, 1 PS; 1 CE)	January 6, 2018	Kranjska Gora, Slovenia	Giant slalom
2018; 12 victories (7 SL, 1 DH, 2 GS, 1 PS; 1 CE)	January 7, 2018	Kranjska Gora, Slovenia	Slalom
2018; 12 victories (7 SL, 1 DH, 2 GS, 1 PS; 1 CE)	January 9, 2018	Flachau, Austria	Slalom
2018; 12 victories (7 SL, 1 DH, 2 GS, 1 PS; 1 CE)	March 10, 2018	Ofterschwang, Germany	Slalom
2018; 12 victories (7 SL, 1 DH, 2 GS, 1 PS; 1 CE)	March 17, 2018	Åre, Sweden	Slalom
2019; 17 victories (8 SL, 4 GS, 3 SG, 1 PS, 1 CE)	November 17, 2018	Levi, Finland	Slalom
2019; 17 victories (8 SL, 4 GS, 3 SG, 1 PS, 1 CE)	November 25, 2018	(United States) Killington, U.S.	Slalom
2019; 17 victories (8 SL, 4 GS, 3 SG, 1 PS, 1 CE)	December 2, 2018	Lake Louise, Canada	Super-G
2019; 17 victories (8 SL, 4 GS, 3 SG, 1 PS, 1 CE)	December 8, 2018	St. Moritz, Switzerland	Super-G
2019; 17 victories (8 SL, 4 GS, 3 SG, 1 PS, 1 CE)	December 9, 2018	St. Moritz, Switzerland	Parallel slalom
2019; 17 victories (8 SL, 4 GS, 3 SG, 1 PS, 1 CE)	December 21, 2018	Courchevel, France	Giant slalom
2019; 17 victories (8 SL, 4 GS, 3 SG, 1 PS, 1 CE)	December 22, 2018	Courchevel, France	Slalom
2019; 17 victories (8 SL, 4 GS, 3 SG, 1 PS, 1 CE)	December 29, 2018	Semmering, Austria	Slalom
2019; 17 victories (8 SL, 4 GS, 3 SG, 1 PS, 1 CE)	January 5, 2019	Zagreb, Croatia	Slalom
2019; 17 victories (8 SL, 4 GS, 3 SG, 1 PS, 1 CE)	January 15, 2019	Kronplatz, Italy	Giant slalom
2019; 17 victories (8 SL, 4 GS, 3 SG, 1 PS, 1 CE)	January 20, 2019	Cortina d'Ampezzo, Italy	Super-G
2019; 17 victories (8 SL, 4 GS, 3 SG, 1 PS, 1 CE)	February 1, 2019	Maribor, Slovenia	Giant slalom
2019; 17 victories (8 SL, 4 GS, 3 SG, 1 PS, 1 CE)	February 2, 2019	Maribor, Slovenia	Slalom
2019; 17 victories (8 SL, 4 GS, 3 SG, 1 PS, 1 CE)	February 19, 2019	Stockholm, Sweden	City event
2019; 17 victories (8 SL, 4 GS, 3 SG, 1 PS, 1 CE)	March 9, 2019	Špindlerův Mlýn, Czech Republic	Slalom
2019; 17 victories (8 SL, 4 GS, 3 SG, 1 PS, 1 CE)	March 16, 2019	Soldeu, Andorra	Slalom
2019; 17 victories (8 SL, 4 GS, 3 SG, 1 PS, 1 CE)	March 17, 2019	Soldeu, Andorra	Giant slalom
2020; 6 victories (3 SL, 1 GS, 1 DH, 1 SG)	November 23, 2019	Levi, Finland	Slalom
2020; 6 victories (3 SL, 1 GS, 1 DH, 1 SG)	December 1, 2019	(United States) Killington, U.S.	Slalom
2020; 6 victories (3 SL, 1 GS, 1 DH, 1 SG)	December 28, 2019	Lienz, Austria	Giant slalom
2020; 6 victories (3 SL, 1 GS, 1 DH, 1 SG)	December 29, 2019	Lienz, Austria	Slalom
2020; 6 victories (3 SL, 1 GS, 1 DH, 1 SG)	January 24, 2020	Bansko, Bulgaria	Downhill
2020; 6 victories (3 SL, 1 GS, 1 DH, 1 SG)	January 26, 2020	Bansko, Bulgaria	Super-G
2021; 3 victories (2 SL, 1 GS)	December 14, 2020	Courchevel, France	Giant slalom
2021; 3 victories (2 SL, 1 GS)	January 12, 2021	Flachau, Austria	Slalom
2021; 3 victories (2 SL, 1 GS)	March 6, 2021	Jasná, Slovakia	Slalom
2022; 5 victories (2 GS, 2 SL, 1 DH)	October 23, 2021	Sölden, Austria	Giant slalom
2022; 5 victories (2 GS, 2 SL, 1 DH)	November 28, 2021	(United States) Killington, U.S.	Slalom
2022; 5 victories (2 GS, 2 SL, 1 DH)	December 21, 2021	Courchevel, France	Giant slalom
2022; 5 victories (2 GS, 2 SL, 1 DH)	January 11, 2022	Schladming, Austria	Slalom
2022; 5 victories (2 GS, 2 SL, 1 DH)	March 16, 2022	Courchevel, France	Downhill
2023; 14 victories (6 SL, 7 GS, 1 SG)	November 19, 2022	Levi, Finland	Slalom
2023; 14 victories (6 SL, 7 GS, 1 SG)	November 20, 2022	Levi, Finland	Slalom
2023; 14 victories (6 SL, 7 GS, 1 SG)	December 18, 2022	St. Moritz, Switzerland	Super-G
2023; 14 victories (6 SL, 7 GS, 1 SG)	December 27, 2022	Semmering, Austria	Giant slalom
2023; 14 victories (6 SL, 7 GS, 1 SG)	December 28, 2022	Semmering, Austria	Giant slalom
2023; 14 victories (6 SL, 7 GS, 1 SG)	December 29, 2022	Semmering, Austria	Slalom
2023; 14 victories (6 SL, 7 GS, 1 SG)	January 4, 2023	Zagreb, Croatia	Slalom
2023; 14 victories (6 SL, 7 GS, 1 SG)	January 8, 2023	Kranjska Gora, Slovenia	Giant slalom
2023; 14 victories (6 SL, 7 GS, 1 SG)	January 24, 2023	Kronplatz, Italy	Giant slalom
2023; 14 victories (6 SL, 7 GS, 1 SG)	January 25, 2023	Kronplatz, Italy	Giant slalom
2023; 14 victories (6 SL, 7 GS, 1 SG)	January 28, 2023	Špindlerův Mlýn, Czech Republic	Slalom
2023; 14 victories (6 SL, 7 GS, 1 SG)	March 10, 2023	Åre, Sweden	Giant slalom
2023; 14 victories (6 SL, 7 GS, 1 SG)	March 11, 2023	Åre, Sweden	Slalom
2023; 14 victories (6 SL, 7 GS, 1 SG)	March 19, 2023	Soldeu, Andorra	Giant slalom
2024; 9 victories (7 SL, 1 GS, 1 DH)	November 12, 2023	Levi, Finland	Slalom
2024; 9 victories (7 SL, 1 GS, 1 DH)	November 26, 2023	(United States) Killington, U.S.	Slalom
2024; 9 victories (7 SL, 1 GS, 1 DH)	December 9, 2023	St. Moritz, Switzerland	Downhill
2024; 9 victories (7 SL, 1 GS, 1 DH)	December 28, 2023	Lienz, Austria	Giant Slalom
2024; 9 victories (7 SL, 1 GS, 1 DH)	December 29, 2023	Lienz, Austria	Slalom
2024; 9 victories (7 SL, 1 GS, 1 DH)	January 16, 2024	Flachau, Austria	Slalom
2024; 9 victories (7 SL, 1 GS, 1 DH)	January 21, 2024	Jasná, Slovakia	Slalom
2024; 9 victories (7 SL, 1 GS, 1 DH)	March 10, 2024	Åre, Sweden	Slalom
2024; 9 victories (7 SL, 1 GS, 1 DH)	March 16, 2024	Saalbach, Austria	Slalom
2025; 4 victories (4 SL)	November 16, 2024	Levi, Finland	Slalom
2025; 4 victories (4 SL)	November 23, 2024	Gurgl, Austria	Slalom
2025; 4 victories (4 SL)	February 23, 2025	Sestriere, Italy	Slalom
2025; 4 victories (4 SL)	March 27, 2025	(United States) Sun Valley, U.S.	Slalom
2026; 9 victories (9 SL)	November 15, 2025	Levi, Finland	Slalom
2026; 9 victories (9 SL)	November 23, 2025	Gurgl, Austria	Slalom
2026; 9 victories (9 SL)	November 30, 2025	(United States) Copper Mountain, U.S.	Slalom
2026; 9 victories (9 SL)	December 16, 2025	Courchevel, France	Slalom
2026; 9 victories (9 SL)	December 28, 2025	Semmering, Austria	Slalom
2026; 9 victories (9 SL)	January 13, 2026	Flachau, Austria	Slalom
2026; 9 victories (9 SL)	January 25, 2026	Špindlerův Mlýn, Czech Republic	Slalom
2026; 9 victories (9 SL)	March 15, 2026	Åre, Sweden	Slalom
2026; 9 victories (9 SL)	March 24, 2026	Hafjell, Norway	Slalom

=== Victories (110) ===
Season	Podiums																					
Season	Downhill			Super-G			Giant slalom			Slalom			Parallel^{[1]}			Combined			Total			
Season	1st place, gold medalist(s)	2nd place, silver medalist(s)	3rd place, bronze medalist(s)	1st place, gold medalist(s)	2nd place, silver medalist(s)	3rd place, bronze medalist(s)	1st place, gold medalist(s)	2nd place, silver medalist(s)	3rd place, bronze medalist(s)	1st place, gold medalist(s)	2nd place, silver medalist(s)	3rd place, bronze medalist(s)	1st place, gold medalist(s)	2nd place, silver medalist(s)	3rd place, bronze medalist(s)	1st place, gold medalist(s)	2nd place, silver medalist(s)	3rd place, bronze medalist(s)	1st place, gold medalist(s)	2nd place, silver medalist(s)	3rd place, bronze medalist(s)	Σ
2012												1									1	1
2013										4		2			1				4		3	7
2014								1	1	5	1								5	2	1	8
2015							1		1	5		1							6		2	8
2016								1		5									5	1		6
2017							3	1		6	1	1	1			1			11	2	1	14
2018	1		2				2	1	2	7	1		2						12	2	4	18
2019				3			4		2	8	1		2	1					17	2	2	21
2020	1	1		1		1	1	1	2	3	1	1							6	3	4	13
2021							1	1	1	2	3	2							3	4	3	10
2022	1				2	2	2	1	1	2	3								5	6	3	14
2023				1			7			6	3	1							14	3	1	18
2024	1						1	1	3	7	1								9	2	3	14
2025										4		1							4		1	5
2026									1	9	1								9	1	1	11
Total	4	1	2	5	2	3	22	8	14	73	16	10	5	1	1	1	0	0	110	28	30	168
Total	7			10			44			99			7			1			168			168

^{1} Including both parallel slalom and parallel giant slalom.

== World Championship results ==
Shiffrin competed in her first World Championships in 2013 at Schladming, Austria, and finished sixth in the giant slalom at Planai. Two days later, in the slalom, she won the world title at age 17.

Year
Year	Age	Slalom	Giant slalom	Super-G	Downhill	Combined	Team combined
2013	17	1	6	—	—	—	—N/a
2015	19	1	8	—	—	—	—N/a
2017	21	1	2	—	—	—	—N/a
2019	23	1	3	1	—	—	—N/a
2021	25	3	2	3	—	1	—N/a
2023	27	2	1	2	—	DSQ SL	—N/a
2025	29	5	—	—	—	—N/a	1

== Olympic results ==
Favored to win the gold medal in slalom at the 2014 Winter Olympics in Sochi, Russia, Shiffrin led after the first run and nearly fell in the second, but held on for victory at Rosa Khutor. Three weeks shy of her 19th birthday, she became the youngest slalom champion in Olympic history. Three days earlier, she finished fifth in the giant slalom, held in the rain.

She competed in the 2018 Winter Olympics in Pyeongchang, where she won the gold medal in the giant slalom and silver medal in the Combined. She placed 4th in the slalom despite being favored to win the gold medal in the event.

Year
Year	Age	Slalom	Giant slalom	Super-G	Downhill	Combined	Team combined	Team event
2014	18	1	5	—	—	—	—N/a	—N/a
2018	22	4	1	—	—	2	—N/a	—
2022	26	DNF1	DNF1	9	18	DNF2	—N/a	4
2026	30	1	11	—	—	—N/a	4	—N/a

== Media appearances and documentaries ==
Days after her first World Cup finals in 2013, Shiffrin was interviewed by David Letterman on the Late Show on March 19.

In 2014, Shiffrin was featured in a one-hour special on NBC television, How to Raise an Olympian, on February 5. Hosted by Meredith Vieira, it chronicled the journeys of seven American Olympians and featured interviews from parents and coaches along with home videos and photos from each athlete's childhood. The event was broadcast on television with live social-media components to enhance each segment. After Shiffrin's first gold medal win, she played "Catch Phrase" with Reese Witherspoon and Usher on The Tonight Show Starring Jimmy Fallon. On July 12, 2014, Shiffrin was a guest on the NPR radio show Wait Wait... Don't Tell Me!, where she won the show's Not My Job game at the Red Rocks Amphitheatre.

On October 27, 2016, Shiffrin, speaking in German, presented the award for the best Austrian sportsman to Marcel Hirscher at a sports gala in Austria. In 2017, Shiffrin discussed her skiing roots and aptitude for napping on NBC's Late Night with Seth Meyers. In 2018, Shiffrin was profiled on CBS News' 60 Minutes.

In the weeks after the February 2019 World Ski Championship, Amanda Ruggeri twice profiled Shiffrin in Deadspin, and she was featured in The Wall Street Journal. In March 2019, after the conclusion of her record-setting World Cup season, she discussed handling anxiety on NBC's Today, addressed dealing with social media trolls on CNN, discussed pay equity on ABC's Good Morning America and the entertainment news show Access, and taught host Jimmy Fallon how to do the shuffle dance on NBC's Tonight Show. The New York Times profiled Shiffrin as "the face of American skiing", a theme echoed in a Sports Illustrated profile and video where Shiffrin talked in detail about her history with Lindsey Vonn.

Shiffrin has been the subject of long-form documentary videos. She is often featured in Outside's In Search of Speed, including in 2015, 2017 and 2018. After covering Shiffrin's training regimen in 2017, Red Bull in 2018 produced the 48-minutes long documentary Peak Season: The Determination of Mikaela Shiffrin. In April 2019, NBC's Olympic channel devoted 25 hours of prime-time to feature 20 of Shiffrin's races in the 2018–2019 season; her fanclub also released a compilation of highlights from her 2018–2019 season.

In October 2022, she was interviewed on Boomer Esiason's podcast. During the interview, reference was made to a piece written by Shiffrin about her father's passing in "The Players' Tribune".

In December 2022, Shiffrin began releasing documentary videos on her own YouTube channel, with themes and content of her choosing. By 2025, this eventually evolved into a podcast series called What’s the Point with Mikaela Shiffrin.

In July 2023 Shiffrin did an hour-long interview on Lewis Howes' "School of Greatness" podcast. A particular message she wanted to convey to young athletes was that she doesn't think self-confidence in results is necessary, that she has plenty of doubts herself—the important thing is having the courage to try, even knowing things may not turn out the way you want.

In Jan 2025 a short biography of her was published as part of the Little People Big Dreams book series for kids.
