= FIS Alpine World Ski Championships 2023 – Women's downhill =

Alpine race in Méribel, France

FIS Alpine World Ski Championships 2023 at the Women's downhill
- Venue: Roc de Fer
- Location: Méribel, France
- Dates: 11 February
- Competitors: 29 from 13 nations

Medalists
| gold medal | Jasmine Flury | Switzerland |
| silver medal | Nina Ortlieb | Austria |
| bronze medal | Corinne Suter | Switzerland |

Women's Downhill
- Location: Roc de Fer; Méribel, France
- Vertical: 685 m (2,247 ft)
- Top elevation: 2,150 m (7,054 ft)
- Base elevation: 1,465 m (4,806 ft)
- Longest run: 2.413 km (1.50 mi)

The Women's downhill competition at the FIS Alpine World Ski Championships 2023 was held at Roc de Fer ski course in Méribel, France, on Saturday, 11 February.

Switzerland's Jasmine Flury won the gold medal, Nina Ortlieb of Austria took the silver, and the bronze medalist was Corinne Suter of Switzerland.

The race course was 2.413 km (1.50 mi) in length, with a vertical drop of 685 m (2,247 ft) from a starting elevation of 2,150 m (7,054 ft) above sea level. Flury's winning time of 88.03 seconds yielded an average speed of 98.680 km/h (61.3 mph) and an average vertical descent rate of 7.781 m/s (25.5 ft/s).

== Results ==
The race started at 11:00 CET (UTC+1) under clear skies. The air temperature was −5 °C (23 °F) at the starting gate and −4 °C (25 °F) at the finish.

| Rank | Bib | Name | Country | Time | Diff |
|---|---|---|---|---|---|
| 1st place, gold medalist(s) | 2 | Jasmine Flury | Switzerland | 1:28.03 | — |
| 2nd place, silver medalist(s) | 5 | Nina Ortlieb | Austria | 1:28.07 | +0.04 |
| 3rd place, bronze medalist(s) | 8 | Corinne Suter | Switzerland | 1:28.15 | +0.12 |
| 4 | 10 | Cornelia Hütter | Austria | 1:28.40 | +0.37 |
| 4 | 7 | Mirjam Puchner | Austria | 1:28.40 | +0.37 |
| 6 | 15 | Ilka Štuhec | Slovenia | 1:28.45 | +0.42 |
| 7 | 1 | Stephanie Venier | Austria | 1:28.60 | +0.57 |
| 8 | 9 | Kira Weidle | Germany | 1:28.64 | +0.61 |
| 9 | 14 | Lara Gut-Behrami | Switzerland | 1:28.74 | +0.71 |
| 10 | 11 | Ragnhild Mowinckel | Norway | 1:28.87 | +0.84 |
| 11 | 20 | Priska Nufer | Switzerland | 1:28.89 | +0.86 |
| 12 | 4 | Laura Gauché | France | 1:29.06 | +1.03 |
| 13 | 13 | Elena Curtoni | Italy | 1:29.08 | +1.05 |
| 14 | 19 | Laura Pirovano | Italy | 1:29.09 | +1.06 |
| 15 | 16 | Kajsa Vickhoff Lie | Norway | 1:29.10 | +1.07 |
| 16 | 3 | Romane Miradoli | France | 1:29.10 | +1.07 |
| 17 | 18 | Joana Hählen | Switzerland | 1:29.29 | +1.26 |
| 18 | 17 | Nicol Delago | Italy | 1:29.44 | +1.41 |
| 19 | 29 | Isabella Wright | United States | 1:29.71 | +1.68 |
| 20 | 25 | Elvedina Muzaferija | Bosnia and Herzegovina | 1:29.94 | +1.91 |
| 21 | 21 | Anouck Errard | France | 1:30.14 | +2.11 |
| 22 | 24 | Cande Moreno | Andorra | 1:30.15 | +2.12 |
| 23 | 23 | Tricia Mangan | United States | 1:30.24 | +2.21 |
| 24 | 22 | Greta Small | Australia | 1:30.33 | +2.30 |
| 25 | 28 | Ania Monica Caill | Romania | 1:32.25 | +4.22 |
| 26 | 27 | Sabrina Simader | Kenya | 1:32.36 | +4.33 |
| | 12 | Breezy Johnson | United States | Did not finish | |
| | 26 | Emma Aicher | Germany | Did not finish | |
| | 6 | Sofia Goggia | Italy | Disqualified | |
