= FIS Alpine World Ski Championships 2023 =

Skiing event in the French Alps

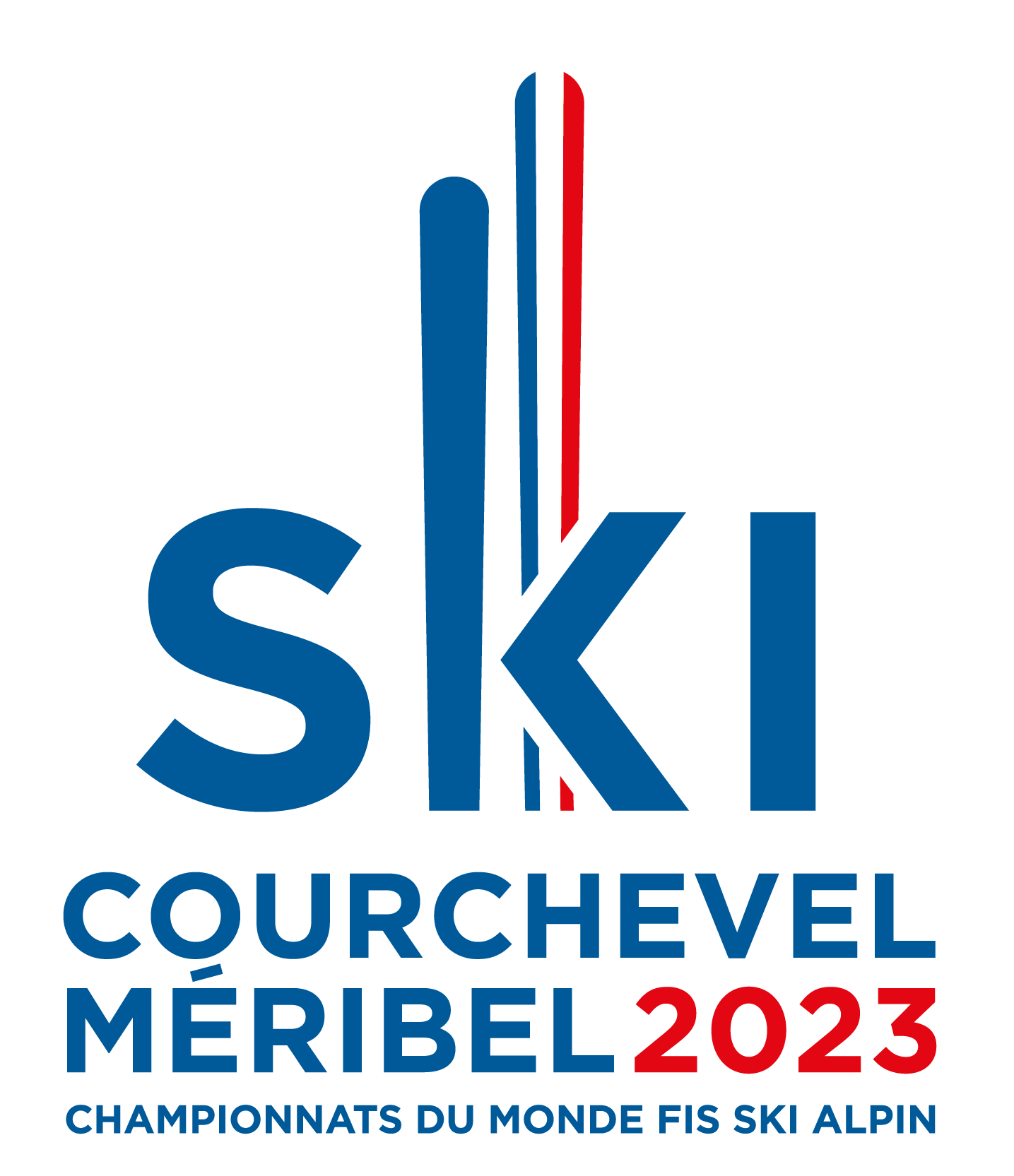
- Host city: Courchevel and Méribel
- Country: France
- Opening: 6 February 2023
- Closing: 19 February 2023
- Opened by: Emmanuel Macron
- Main venue: L'Éclipse (M), Roc de Fer (W)

Location in Europe
Location in the Alps

The 47th FIS Alpine World Ski Championships took place from 6 to 19 February 2023 in two neighboring locations in the French Alps, Courchevel and Méribel.

The location was decided in May 2018 during the 51st FIS Congress in Costa Navarino (Greece), where Courchevel-Méribel won against Austrian Saalbach-Hinterglemm with 9 to 6 votes.

The same two towns already hosted parts of the 1992 Winter Olympic Games. In Courchevel, ski jumping and the Nordic combination took place, and Méribel was the location for the women's alpine skiing.

== Bidding ==
In 2015, upon a request by the Fédération Française de Ski (FFS), Courchevel, Méribel and Val d'Isère drew up proposals to organize a ski world championship in France. In January 2016, the FFS then chose the joint bid of Courchevel and Méribel. On 24 January 2017, the bid of the two alpine resorts was submitted to the FIS. Finally, in May 2018, the FIS selected the French bid, after competing against the Austrian bid. The then-time president of the Austrian Ski Association, Peter Schröcksnadel, commented that the decision was understandable, as the French had been waiting for a World Championships in their own country for four years longer than the Austrians, and that Austria had already hosted several large sport events during the last few years.

In March 2022, Courchevel and Méribel hosted the finals of the 2021–22 FIS Alpine Ski World Cup.

== Qualification ==
Per discipline and gender, each national ski federation could nominate four skiers. The current world champion in the respective discipline was allowed as a fifth competitor. In addition, every participant must had less than 80 FIS points. Skiers who perform better in recent official competitions have less points; the top 30 skiers on the current World Cup starting list have, by definition, between 0 and 5.99 FIS Points. In some events, competitors passed a further qualification at the Championships themselves (see below).

== Schedule and course information ==
The competitive program was as follows (all times CET):

Date	Time	Discipline	Site	Course	Remarks
6 February 2023	11:00	Women's alpine combination	Méribel	Roc de Fer	
7 February 2023	11:00	Men's alpine combination	Courchevel	L'Éclipse	
8 February 2023	11:30	Women's Super G	Méribel	Roc de Fer	
9 February 2023	11:30	Men's Super G	Courchevel	L'Éclipse	
11 February 2023	11:00	Women's downhill	Méribel	Roc de Fer	
12 February 2023	11:00	Men's downhill	Courchevel	L'Éclipse	
14 February 2023	12:15	Alpine team parallel slalom	Méribel	Roc de Fer	
15 February 2023	12:00	Men & Women parallel giant slalom	Méribel	Roc de Fer	
16 February 2023	09:45 (1st run)	Women's giant slalom	Méribel	Roc de Fer	
17 February 2023	10:00 (1st run)	Men's giant slalom	Courchevel	L'Éclipse	
18 February 2023	10:00 (1st run)	Women's slalom	Méribel	Roc de Fer	
19 February 2023	10:00 (1st run)	Men's slalom	Courchevel	L'Éclipse	

Qualifying races

Date	Time	Discipline	Site	Remarks
14 Feb	17:30 (1st run)	Parallel slalom, men & women	Courchevel	
16 Feb	10:00 (1st run)	Men's giant slalom	Courchevel	
18 Feb	10:00 (1st run)	Men's slalom	Courchevel	

=== Course information ===
Date	Race	Start elevation	Finish elevation	Vertical drop	Course length	Average gradient
Sun 12 Feb	Downhill – men	2,235 m (7,333 ft)	1,290 m (4,232 ft)	945 m (3,100 ft)	3.100 km (1.926 mi)	30.5%
Sat 11 Feb	Downhill – women	2,150 m (7,054 ft)	1,465 m (4,806 ft)	685 m (2,247 ft)	2.413 km (1.499 mi)	28.4%
Thu 9 Feb	Super-G – men	1,880 m (6,168 ft)	1,290 m (4,232 ft)	590 m (1,936 ft)	1.857 km (1.154 mi)	31.8%
Wed 8 Feb	Super-G – women	2,065 m (6,775 ft)	1,465 m (4,806 ft)	600 m (1,969 ft)	2.204 km (1.370 mi)	27.2%
Tue 7 Feb	Super-G – (AC) – men	1,880 m (6,168 ft)	1,290 m (4,232 ft)	590 m (1,936 ft)	1.857 km (1.154 mi)	31.8%
Mon 6 Feb	Super-G – (AC) – women	1,965 m (6,447 ft)	1,465 m (4,806 ft)	500 m (1,640 ft)	1.818 km (1.130 mi)	27.5%
Fri 17 Feb	Giant slalom – men	1,730 m (5,676 ft)	1,280 m (4,199 ft)	450 m (1,476 ft)		
Thu 16 Feb	Giant slalom – women	1,830 m (6,004 ft)	1,452 m (4,764 ft)	378 m (1,240 ft)		
Sun 19 Feb	Slalom – men	1,485 m (4,872 ft)	1,280 m (4,199 ft)	205 m (673 ft)		
Sat 18 Feb	Slalom – women	1,630 m (5,348 ft)	1,432 m (4,698 ft)	198 m (650 ft)		
Tue 7 Feb	Slalom – (AC) – men	1,485 m (4,872 ft)	1,290 m (4,232 ft)	195 m (640 ft)		
Mon 6 Feb	Slalom – (AC) – women	1,620 m (5,315 ft)	1,432 m (4,698 ft)	188 m (617 ft)		
Wed 15 Feb	Parallel GS – men	2,006 m (6,581 ft)	1,807 m (5,928 ft)	199 m (653 ft)		
Wed 15 Feb	Parallel GS – women	2,006 m (6,581 ft)	1,807 m (5,928 ft)	199 m (653 ft)		
Tue 14 Feb	Team event – mixed	1,555 m (5,102 ft)	1,432 m (4,698 ft)	123 m (404 ft)		

== Medal summary ==
=== Medal table ===
* Host nation (France)

Rank	Nation	Gold	Silver	Bronze	Total
1	Switzerland	3	3	1	7
2	Norway	2	3	4	9
3	United States	2	2	0	4
4	Italy	2	1	1	4
5	Canada	2	0	2	4
6	France*	1	0	1	2
6	Germany	1	0	1	2
8	Austria	0	3	4	7
9	Greece	0	1	0	1
Totals (9 entries)		13	13	14	40

== Events ==
=== Men's events ===
Event	Gold		Silver		Bronze	
Downhill	Marco Odermatt; Switzerland	1:47.05	Aleksander Aamodt Kilde; Norway	1:47.53	Cameron Alexander; Canada	1:47.94
Super-G	James Crawford; Canada	1:07.22	Aleksander Aamodt Kilde; Norway	1:07.23	Alexis Pinturault; France	1:07.48
Giant slalom	Marco Odermatt; Switzerland	2:34.08	Loïc Meillard; Switzerland	2:34.40	Marco Schwarz; Austria	2:34.48
Slalom	Henrik Kristoffersen; Norway	1:39.50	AJ Ginnis; Greece	1:39.70	Alex Vinatzer; Italy	1:39.88
Alpine combined	Alexis Pinturault; France	1:53.31	Marco Schwarz; Austria	1:53.41	Raphael Haaser; Austria	1:53.75
Parallel giant slalom	Alexander Schmid; Germany		Dominik Raschner; Austria		Timon Haugan; Norway	

=== Women's events ===
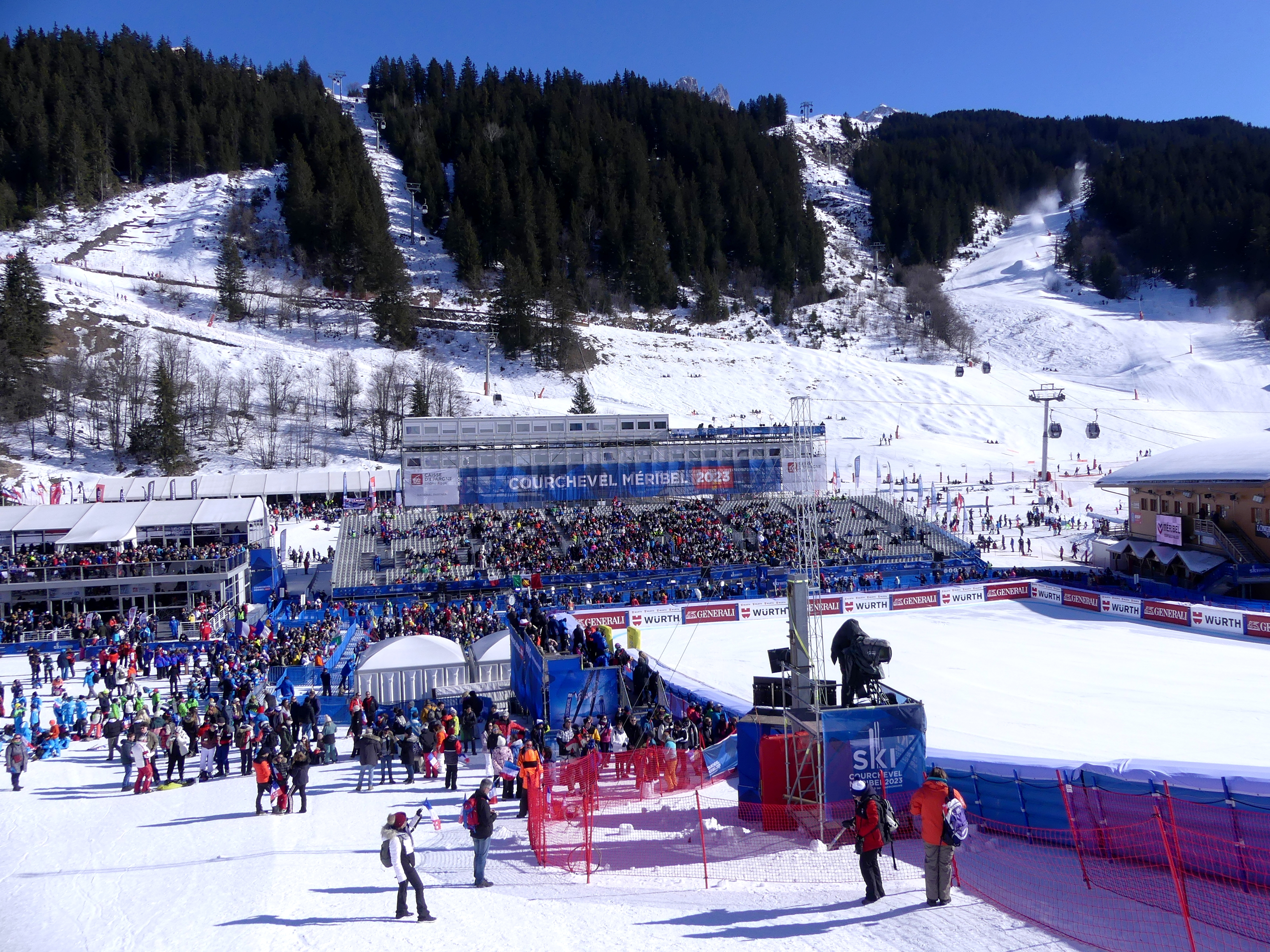
Méribel during Women's Super G

Event	Gold		Silver		Bronze	
Downhill	Jasmine Flury; Switzerland	1:28.03	Nina Ortlieb; Austria	1:28.07	Corinne Suter; Switzerland	1:28.15
Super-G	Marta Bassino; Italy	1:28.06	Mikaela Shiffrin; United States	1:28.17	Cornelia Hütter; Austria; Kajsa Vickhoff Lie; Norway	1:28.39
Giant slalom	Mikaela Shiffrin; United States	2:07.13	Federica Brignone; Italy	2:07.25	Ragnhild Mowinckel; Norway	2:07.35
Slalom	Laurence St. Germain; Canada	1:43.15	Mikaela Shiffrin; United States	1:43.72	Lena Dürr; Germany	1:43.84
Alpine combined	Federica Brignone; Italy	1:57.47	Wendy Holdener; Switzerland	1:59.09	Ricarda Haaser; Austria	1:59.73
Parallel giant slalom	Maria Therese Tviberg; Norway		Wendy Holdener; Switzerland		Thea Louise Stjernesund; Norway	

=== Mixed ===
Event	Gold	Silver	Bronze
Team parallel event	United States; Tommy Ford; Katie Hensien; Paula Moltzan; Nina O'Brien; River Radamus; Luke Winters	Norway; Timon Haugan; Kristin Lysdahl; Leif Kristian Nestvold-Haugen; Alexander Steen Olsen; Thea Louise Stjernesund; Maria Therese Tviberg	Canada; Valérie Grenier; Erik Read; Jeffrey Read; Britt Richardson
