= Andrea Filser =

German alpine skier

Personal information
- Born: 25 March 1993 (age 33)

Skiing career
- Sport: Alpine skiing
- Club: SV Wildsteig
- Disciplines: Giant slalom, slalom
- World Cup debut: November 2012 (age 19)

World Championships
- Teams: 2 – (2021, 2023)
- Medals: 1 (0 gold)

World Cup
- Seasons: 2 – (2013, 2021)
- Podiums: 0
- Overall titles: 0 – (76th in 2021)
- Discipline titles: 0 – (18th in PAR, 2022)
Medal record
Women's alpine skiing
Representing Germany
World Championships
| Bronze medal – third place | 2021 Cortina d’Ampezzo | Team event |

Andrea Filser (born 25 March 1993) is a German World Cup alpine ski racer.

Filser represented Germany at the World Championships in 2021, where she won bronze medal in the team event.

== World Cup results ==
=== Season standings ===
| Season | Age | Overall | Slalom | Giant slalom | Super-G | Downhill | Combined | Parallel |
|---|---|---|---|---|---|---|---|---|
| 2013 | 19 | 109 | 50 | — | — | — | — | —N/a |
| 2021 | 27 | 76 | 38 | 42 | — | — | —N/a | 29 |
| 2022 | 28 | 98 | 47 | — | — | — | —N/a | 18 |
| 2023 | 29 | 57 | 26 | — | — | — | —N/a | —N/a |

Standings through 19 January 2023

=== Top twenty results ===
- 0 podiums; 4 top twenties

| Season | Date | Location | Discipline | Place |
|---|---|---|---|---|
| 2022 | 13 Nov 2021 | Lech/Zürs, Austria | Parallel-G | 18th |
| 2022 | 21 Nov 2021 | Levi, Finland | Slalom | 18th |
| 2023 | 20 Nov 2022 | Levi, Finland | Slalom | 13th |
| 2023 | 11 Dec 2022 | Sestriere, Italy | Slalom | 15th |

== World Championship results ==
| Year | Age | Slalom | Giant slalom | Super-G | Downhill | Combined | Team event | Parallel |
|---|---|---|---|---|---|---|---|---|
| 2021 | 27 | 20 | 20 | — | — | — | 3 | 11 |
| 2023 | 29 | 32 | — | — | — | — | DNF | 6 |
