= Laura Pirovano =

Italian alpine skier (born 1997)

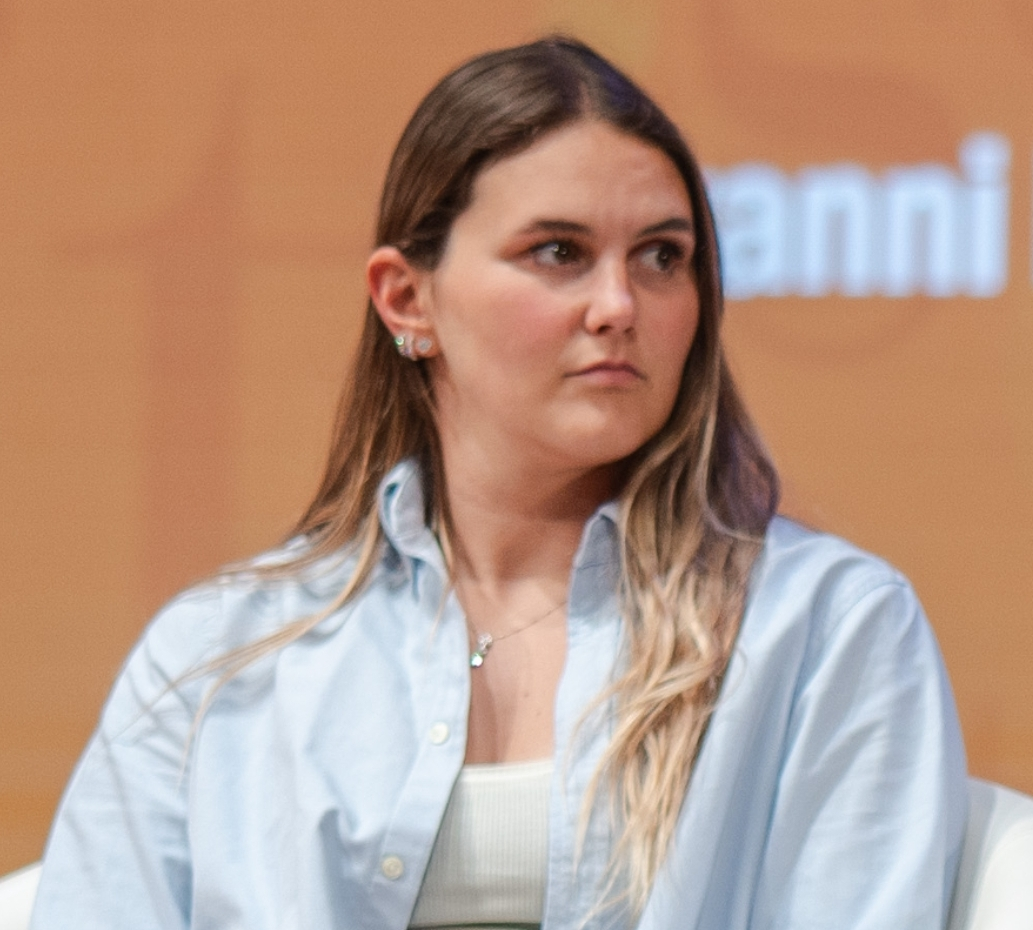
- Pirovano in 2026

Personal information
- Born: 20 November 1997 (age 28) Trento, Trentino, Italy
- Height: 1.63 m (5 ft 4 in)

Skiing career
- Country: Italy
- Sport: Alpine skiing
- Club: G.S. Fiamme Gialle
- Disciplines: Downhill, super-G, giant slalom, combined
- World Cup debut: 28 December 2015 (age 18)

Olympics
- Teams: 1 – (2026)
- Medals: 0

World Championships
- Teams: 3 – (2021, 2023, 2025)
- Medals: 0

World Cup
- Seasons: 10 – (2016–2021, 2023-2026)
- Wins: 3 – (3 DH)
- Podiums: 3 – (3 DH)
- Overall titles: 0 – (7th in 2026)
- Discipline titles: 1 – (DH, 2026)
Medal record
Women's alpine skiing
Representing Italy
Junior World Championships
Gold medal – first place	2017 Åre	Giant slalom

Laura "Lolli" Pirovano (Italian pronunciation: [ˈlaura piˈrɔːvano]; born 20 November 1997) is an Italian World Cup alpine ski racer, and specializes in the speed events of downhill and super-G.

== Biography ==
On 9 January 2021 at age 23, Pirovano achieved her first top-five result in a World Cup event, finishing fifth in a downhill at St Anton, Austria. She won her first World Cup race (which was also her first podium finish) in her tenth season at Val di Fassa, Italy on 6 March 2026. Another downhill win came the next day, she won both races by just 0.01 seconds. Thanks to her third consecutive downhill win in Kvitfjell, Pirovano won the small crystal globe in downhill for the 2025-2026 season.

== World Cup results ==
=== Season titles ===
- 1 title – (1 downhill)

Season	Discipline
2026	Downhill

=== Season standings ===
Season
Season	Age	Overall	Slalom	Giant slalom	Super-G	Downhill	Combined	Parallel
2018	20	114	—	40	—	—	—	—N/a
2019	21	no World Cup points earned						—N/a
2020	22	40	—	41	35	26	19	25
2021	23	22	—	56	26	6	—N/a	—
2022	24	did not compete					—N/a	
2023	25	42	—	—	27	21	—N/a	—N/a
2024	26	27	—	—	16	10	—N/a	—N/a
2025	27	19	—	—	14	6	—N/a	—N/a
2026	28	7	—	52	12	1st place, gold medalist(s)	—N/a	—N/a

=== Race podiums ===
- 3 wins (3 DH)
- 3 podiums (3 DH), 33 top tens

Season
Season	Date	Location	Discipline	Place
2026	6 March 2026	Val di Fassa, Italy	Downhill	1st
2026	7 March 2026	Val di Fassa, Italy	Downhill	1st
2026	21 March 2026	Kvitfjell, Norway	Downhill	1st

== World Championship results ==
Year
Year	Age	Slalom	Giant slalom	Super-G	Downhill	Combined	Team combined	Parallel	Team event
2021	23	—	26	—	12	—	—N/a	—	QF
2023	25	—	—	—	14	—	—N/a	—	—
2025	27	—	—	18	13	—N/a	DNF2	—N/a	—

== Olympic results ==
Year
Year	Age	Slalom	Giant slalom	Super-G	Downhill	Team combined
2026	28	—	—	5	6	DNF2
