= Andrea Ellenberger =

Swiss World Cup alpine ski racer

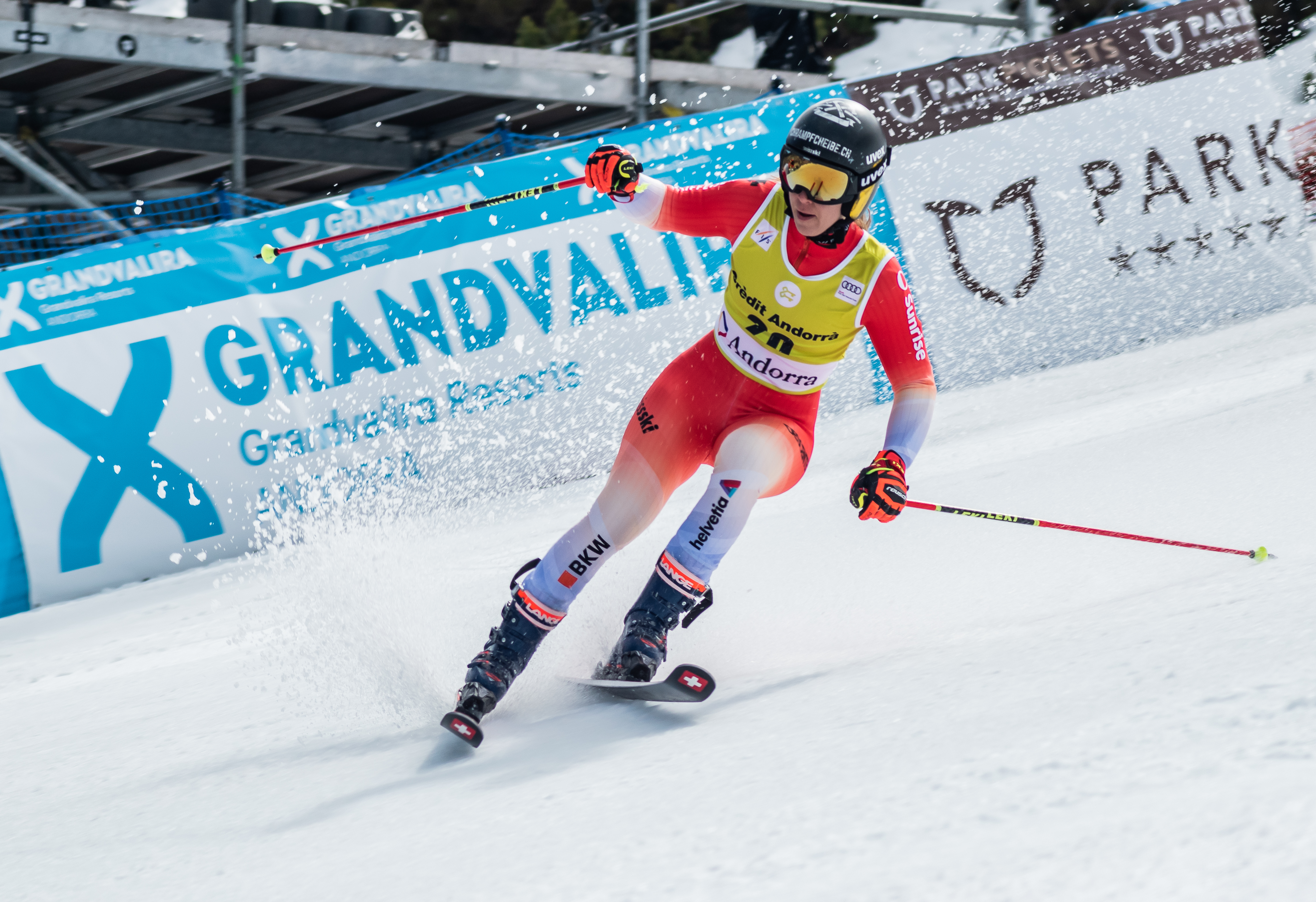

Personal information
- Born: 22 March 1993 (age 33) Switzerland
- Height: 1.70 m (5 ft 7 in)
- Website: andreaellenberger.ch

Skiing career
- Sport: Alpine skiing
- Club: Hergiswil
- Disciplines: Giant slalom, slalom
- World Cup debut: 16 December 2012 (age 19)

Olympics
- Teams: 0

World Championships
- Teams: 2 − (2019, 2023)
- Medals: 1 (1 gold)

World Cup
- Seasons: 7 − (2019–2025)
- Podiums: 0
- Overall titles: 0 – (64th in 2022)
- Discipline titles: 0 – (12th in PAR, 2022)
Medal record
Women's alpine skiing
Representing Switzerland
World Championships
Gold medal – first place	2019 Åre	Team event

Andrea Ellenberger (born 22 March 1993) is a Swiss World Cup alpine ski racer.

She competed at her first World Championships in 2019, winning a gold medal in the team event.

== World Cup results ==
=== Season standings ===
Season	Age	Overall	Slalom	Giant slalom	Super-G	Downhill	Combined	Parallel
2019	25	88	—	32	—	—	—	—N/a
2020	26	71	—	23	—	—	—	38
2021	27	80	—	33	—	—	—N/a	18
2022	28	64	—	26	—	—	—N/a	12
2023	29	55	—	19	—	—	—N/a	—N/a

Standings through 5 February 2023

== World Championship results ==
Year	Age	Slalom	Giant slalom	Super-G	Downhill	Combined	Parallel	Team event
2019	25	—	10	—	—	—	—N/a	1
2023	29	—	DNF1	—	—	—	14	5
