= Maria Therese Tviberg =

Norwegian alpine ski racer (born 1994)

Maria Tviberg
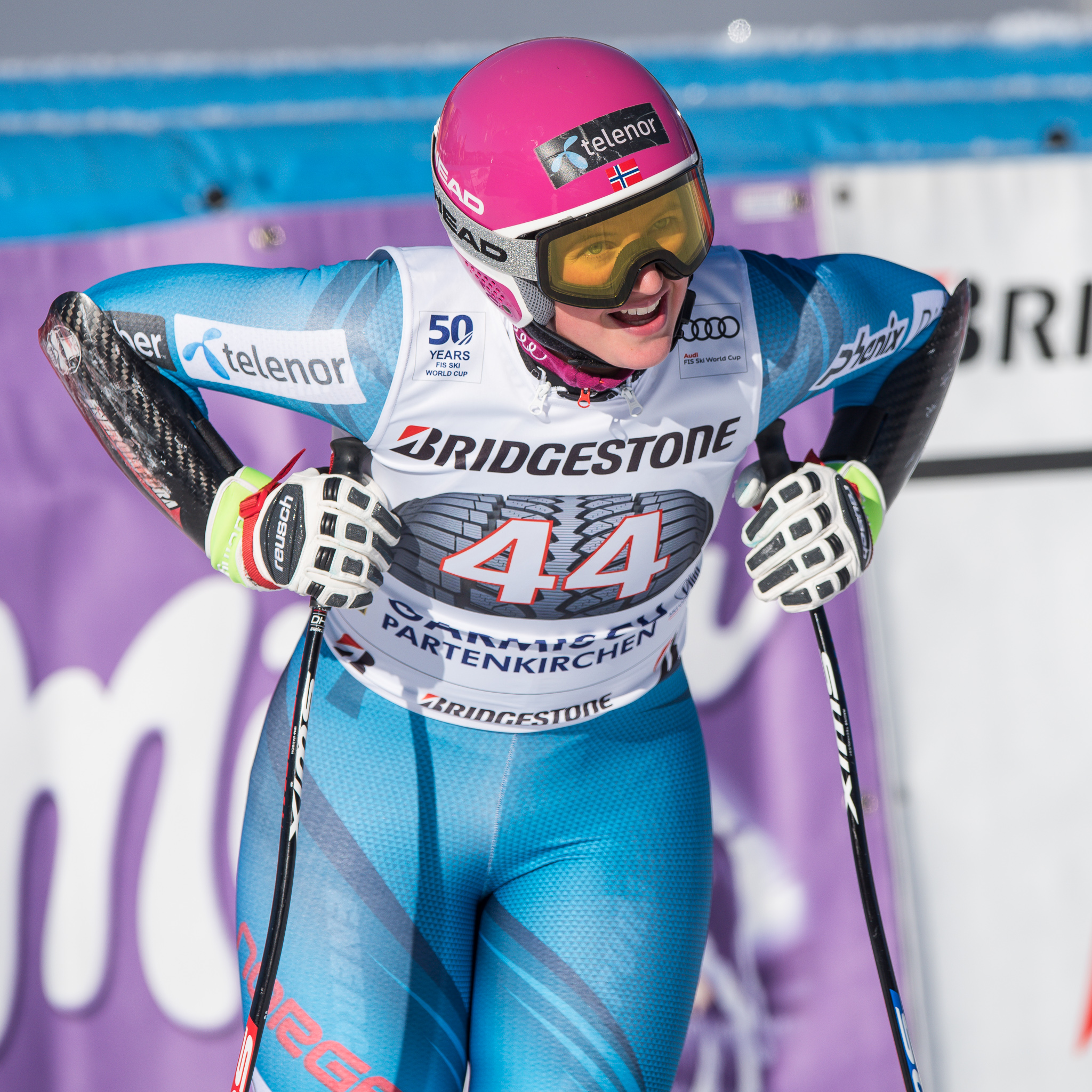
- Tviberg at Garmisch in January 2017

Personal information
- Full name: Maria Therese Tviberg
- Born: 7 April 1994 (age 32) Bergen, Norway
- Height: 174 cm (5 ft 9 in)

Skiing career
- Sport: Alpine skiing
- Club: Geilo IL
- Disciplines: Slalom, giant slalom
- World Cup debut: 24 January 2015 (age 20)

Olympics
- Teams: 1 – (2022)
- Medals: 1 (0 gold)

World Championships
- Teams: 3 – (2015, 2017, 2023)
- Medals: 2 (1 gold)

World Cup
- Seasons: 8 – (2015, 2017, 2019– 2024)
- Podiums: 0
- Overall titles: 0 – (40th in 2022)
- Discipline titles: 0 – (11th in AC, 2017)
Medal record
Women's alpine skiing
Representing Norway
Olympic Games
Bronze medal – third place	2022 Beijing	Team event
World Championships
Gold medal – first place	2023 Méribel	Parallel
Silver medal – second place	2023 Méribel	Team event
Junior World Championships
Silver medal – second place	2013 Quebec	Combined
Silver medal – second place	2015 Hafjell	Downhill

Maria Therese Tviberg (born 7 April 1994) is a retired Norwegian World Cup alpine ski racer and specializes in the technical events of slalom and giant slalom. She competed at the 2015 World Championships in Beaver Creek, USA, in the Super-G, Downhill, and Combined. On 28 November 2017, Tviberg was injured during a downhill training run at Lake Louise in Alberta, Canada. was airlifted by helicopter to a hospital, and missed the remainder of the season.

== World Cup results ==
=== Season standings ===
Season	Age	Overall	Slalom	Giant slalom	Super-G	Downhill	Combined	Parallel
2015	20	85	—	—	44	38	—	—N/a
2016	21	did not compete						
2017	22	49	—	—	28	31	11	—N/a
2018	23	injured						
2019	24	114	—	46	—	—	—	—N/a
2020	25	56	—	16	—	—	—	31
2021	26	63	30	43	—	—	—N/a	—
2022	27	40	24	18	—	—	—N/a	24
2023	28	37	20	22	—	—	—N/a	—N/a

Standings through 5 February 2023

=== Top ten finishes ===
- 0 podiums; 11 top tens (7 SL, 3 GS, 1 AC)

== World Championship results ==
Year	Age	Slalom	Giant slalom	Super-G	Downhill	Combined	Parallel	Team event
2015	20	—	—	25	27	DNF2	—N/a	—
2017	22	—	—	25	25	14	—N/a	—
2023	28	DNS2	19	—	—	—	1	2

== Olympic results ==
Year	Age	Slalom	Giant slalom	Super-G	Downhill	Combined	Team
2022	27	DNF1	12	—	—	—	3
