= 2022 Alpine Skiing World Cup – Women's parallel =

Alpine ski discipline year standings

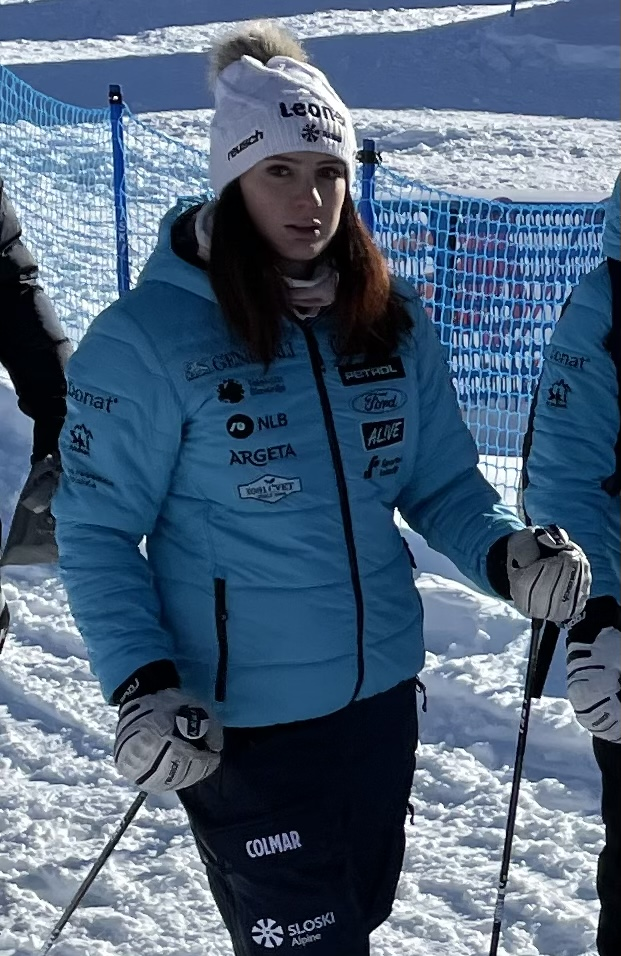
2022 Women's parallel World Cup: Andreja Slokar of Slovenia, season champion; 2022 Women's World Cup; Overall • Downhill • Super-G; Giant slalom • Slalom • Parallel
Previous: 2021	Next: 2023

The women's parallel competition in the 2022 FIS Alpine Skiing World Cup consisted of only 1 event, a parallel giant slalom, due to the continuing COVID-19 pandemic. The sole event was won by Andreja Slokar, who thus won the season championship. Because only one race was run, Slokar will not be awarded a crystal globe for winning this discipline. This specific championship includes both parallel giant slalom and parallel slalom races. At this time, individual parallel races are not included in the season finals.

The season was interrupted by the 2022 Winter Olympics in Beijing, China (at the Yanqing National Alpine Skiing Centre in Yanqing District) from 6–20 February 2022. The only parallel competition was a mixed team competition (2 men and 2 women per country), which was held on 20 February 2022.

As of 2025, this was the last season that parallel was contested as a World Cup event.

== Standings ==
#	Skier	13 Nov 2021; Lech/Zürs (Austria); PG	Total
1	(Slovenia) Andreja Slokar	100	100
2	(Norway) Thea Louise Stjernesund	80	80
3	(Norway) Kristin Lysdahl	60	60
4	(Italy) Marta Bassino	50	50
5	(Sweden) Sara Hector	45	45
6	(Norway) Marte Monsen	40	40
7	(Germany) Lena Dürr	36	36
8	(Slovenia) Tina Robnik	32	32
9	(Austria) Stephanie Brunner	29	29
10	(France) Coralie Frasse Sombet	26	26
11	(Poland) Maryna Gąsienica-Daniel	24	24
12	(Switzerland) Andrea Ellenberger	22	22
13	(Austria) Elisa Mörzinger	20	20
14	(Switzerland) Vanessa Kasper	18	18
15	(Switzerland) Lara Gut-Behrami	16	16
16	(Austria) Katharina Liensberger	15	15
17	(Switzerland) Simone Wild	14	14
18	(Germany) Andrea Filser	13	13
19	(Germany) Emma Aicher	12	12
20	(Austria) Katharina Truppe	11	11
21	(Sweden) Estelle Alphand	10	10
22	(France) Clara Direz	9	9
23	(Austria) Chiara Mair	8	8
24	(Norway) Maria Therese Tviberg	7	7
25	(Switzerland) Camille Rast	6	6
	References		

- Winner
- 2nd place
- 3rd place
- DNS = Did not start
- DNQ = Did not qualify
- Updated at 29 November 2021, after all events.

== See also ==
- 2022 Alpine Skiing World Cup – Women's summary rankings
- 2022 Alpine Skiing World Cup – Women's overall
- 2022 Alpine Skiing World Cup – Women's downhill
- 2022 Alpine Skiing World Cup – Women's super-G
- 2022 Alpine Skiing World Cup – Women's giant slalom
- 2022 Alpine Skiing World Cup – Women's slalom
- World Cup scoring system
