= 2021 Alpine Skiing World Cup – Women's parallel =

Alpine ski discipline year standings

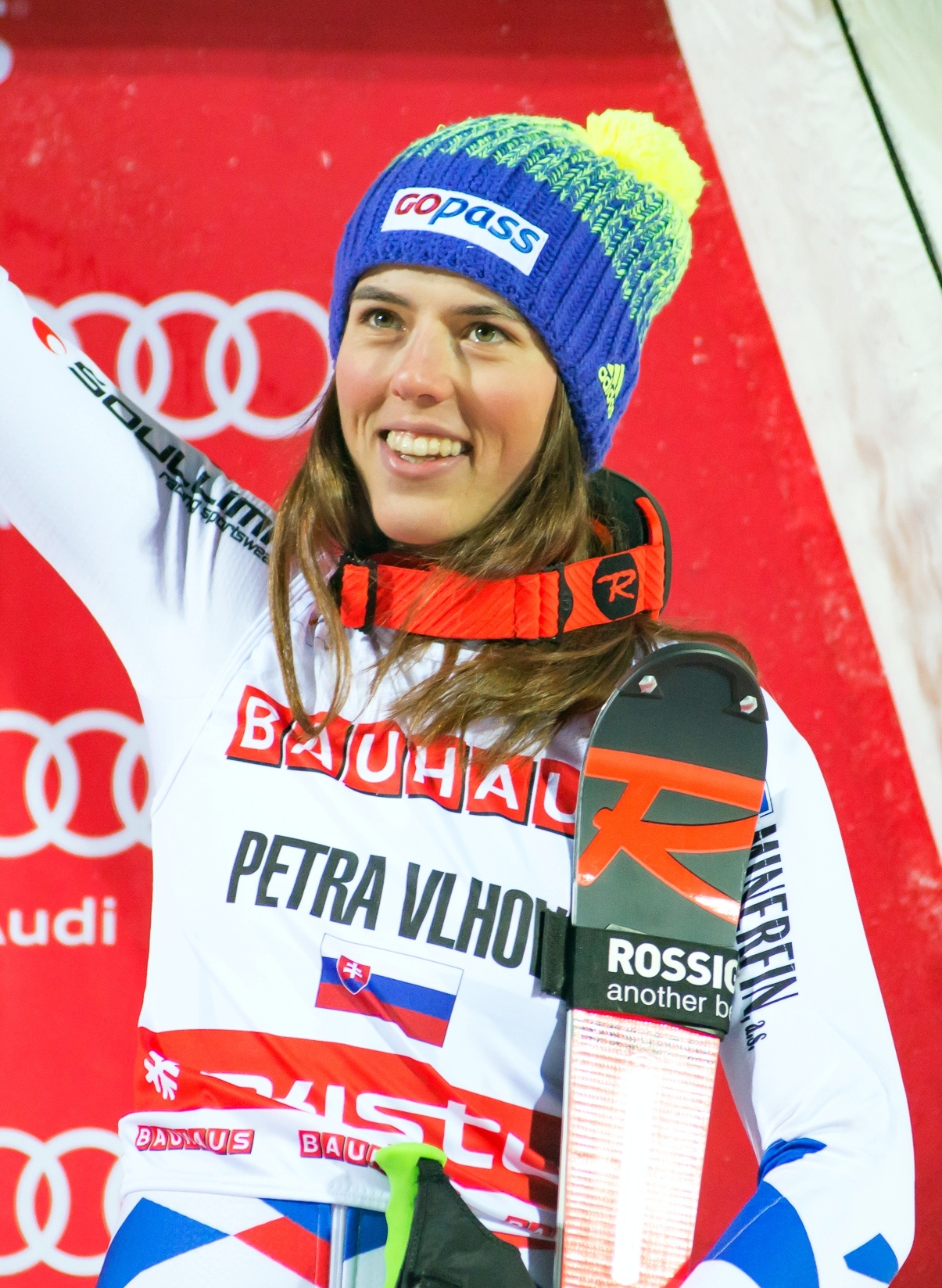
2021 Women's parallel World Cup: Petra Vlhová of Slovakia, season champion; 2021 Women's World Cup; Overall • Downhill • Super-G; Giant slalom • Slalom • Parallel
Previous: 2020	Next: 2022

The women's parallel competition in the 2021 FIS Alpine Skiing World Cup consisted of only 1 event, a parallel giant slalom, due to the COVID-19 pandemic. The tentative schedule had called for three parallel events, but the other two (scheduled for St. Moritz and Davos, Switzerland) were removed to limit the amount of travel during the pandemic.

The sole event was won by Petra Vlhová, who thus won the season championship, although a crystal globe was not awarded for it due to the limited events.

This specific championship includes both parallel giant slalom and parallel slalom races. At this time, parallel races are not included in the season finals, being held in 2021 in Lenzerheide, Switzerland.

The season was interrupted by the 2021 World Ski Championships, which were held from 8–21 February in Cortina d'Ampezzo, Italy. The women's parallel giant slalom was held on 16 February 2021.

== Standings ==
#	Skier	26 Nov 2020; Lech/Zürs (Austria); PG	Total
1	(Slovakia) Petra Vlhová	100	100
2	(United States) Paula Moltzan	80	80
3	(Switzerland) Lara Gut-Behrami	60	60
4	(Sweden) Sara Hector	50	50
5	(Italy) Marta Bassino	45	45
6	(Norway) Thea Louise Stjernesund	40	40
7	(Italy) Federica Brignone	36	36
8	(Austria) Elisa Mörzinger	32	32
9	(Poland) Maryna Gąsienica-Daniel	29	29
10	(Netherlands) Adriana Jelinkova	26	26
11	(Slovenia) Tina Robnik	24	24
12	(France) Coralie Frasse Sombet	22	22
13	(Austria) Katharina Truppe	20	20
14	(Austria) Franziska Gritsch	18	18
15	(Norway) Kristin Lysdahl	16	16
16	(Austria) Katharina Liensberger	15	15
17	(United Kingdom) Alex Tilley	14	14
18	(Switzerland) Andrea Ellenberger	13	13
19	(New Zealand) Alice Robinson	12	12
20	(Switzerland) Wendy Holdener	11	11
21	(Slovenia) Meta Hrovat	10	10
22	(Germany) Lena Dürr	9	9
23	(France) Joséphine Forni	8	8
24	(Switzerland) Jasmina Suter	7	7
25	(United States) A.J. Hurt	6	6
	References		

- Winner
- 2nd place
- 3rd place
- DNS = Did not start
- DNQ = Did not qualify
- Updated at 10 March 2021, after all events.

== See also ==
- 2021 Alpine Skiing World Cup – Women's summary rankings
- 2021 Alpine Skiing World Cup – Women's overall
- 2021 Alpine Skiing World Cup – Women's downhill
- 2021 Alpine Skiing World Cup – Women's super-G
- 2021 Alpine Skiing World Cup – Women's giant slalom
- 2021 Alpine Skiing World Cup – Women's slalom
- World Cup scoring system
