= FIS Alpine World Ski Championships 2021 – Women's parallel giant slalom =

Women's parallel giant slalom at the FIS Alpine World Ski Championships 2021
- Location: Cortina d'Ampezzo, Italy
- Date: 16 February
- Competitors: 52 from 23 nations

Medalists
gold medal	Marta Bassino	Italy
gold medal	Katharina Liensberger	Austria
bronze medal	Tessa Worley	France

Women's Parallel Giant Slalom
- Location: Lino Lacedelli; Cortina d'Ampezzo, Italy
- Vertical: 165 m (541 ft)
- Top elevation: 2,055 m (6,742 ft)
- Base elevation: 1,890 m (6,201 ft)

The Women's parallel giant slalom competition at the FIS Alpine World Ski Championships 2021 was held on 16 February 2021.

== Qualification ==
The qualification was started at 09:00.

Rank	Bib	Name	Country	Red course	Blue course	Notes
1	12	Wendy Holdener	Switzerland		32.69 (1)	Q
2	11	Meta Hrovat	Slovenia	32.78 (1)		Q
3	10	Tina Robnik	Slovenia		32.95 (2)	Q
4	14	Maryna Gąsienica-Daniel	Poland		33.00 (3)	Q
5	15	Katharina Liensberger	Austria	33.04 (2)		Q
6	13	Coralie Frasse Sombet	France	33.14 (3)		Q
7	29	Stephanie Brunner	Austria	33.33 (4)		Q
8	26	Andrea Filser	Germany		33.33 (4)	Q
9	3	Federica Brignone	Italy	33.35 (5)		Q
10	19	Estelle Alphand	Sweden	33.39 (6)		Q
11	4	Paula Moltzan	United States		33.39 (5)	Q
12	28	Tessa Worley	France		33.40 (6)	Q
13	31	Piera Hudson	New Zealand	33.53 (7)		Q
14	17	Nina O'Brien	United States	33.55 (8)		Q
15	9	Franziska Gritsch	Austria	33.56 (9)		
16	18	Alexandra Tilley	Great Britain		33.65 (7)	Q
17	2	Marta Bassino	Italy		33.68 (8)	Q
18	32	Lara Della Mea	Italy		33.69 (9)	
19	41	Emma Aicher	Germany	33.73 (10)		
20	5	Lara Gut-Behrami	Switzerland	33.80 (11)		
21	8	Kristin Lysdahl	Norway		33.83 (10)	
22	40	Jonna Luthman	Sweden		33.84 (11)	
23	44	Cassidy Gray	Canada		33.87 (12)	
24	30	Andreja Slokar	Slovenia		33.88 (13)	
25	37	Camille Rast	Switzerland	33.92 (12)		
26	34	Kristina Riis-Johannessen	Norway		33.92 (14)	
27	16	Lena Dürr	Germany		33.95 (15)	
28	23	A.J. Hurt	United States	33.99 (13)		
29	39	Neja Dvornik	Slovenia	34.01 (14)		
30	45	Charlotte Lingg	Liechtenstein	34.09 (15)		
31	20	Asa Ando	Japan		34.13 (16)	
32	22	Jasmina Suter	Switzerland		34.16 (17)	
33	6	Sara Hector	Sweden		34.16 (17)	
34	27	Charlie Guest	Great Britain	34.29 (16)		
35	21	Laura Pirovano	Italy	34.44 (17)		
36	24	Ramona Siebenhofer	Austria		34.58 (19)	
37	49	Francesca Baruzzi	Argentina	34.85 (18)		
38	33	Doriane Escané	France	34.90 (19)		
39	48	Erika Pykäläinen	Finland		34.95 (20)	
40	36	Riikka Honkanen	Finland		35.11 (21)	
41	7	Thea Louise Stjernesund	Norway	35.17 (20)		
42	52	Noa Szőllős	Israel		35.19 (22)	
43	35	Gabriela Capová	Czech Republic	36.05 (21)		
44	46	Kim Vanreusel	Belgium		36.15 (23)	
45	42	Maria Shkanova	Belarus		36.17 (24)	
46	51	Zazie Huml	Czech Republic	36.56 (22)		
–	1	Petra Vlhová	Slovakia	DNF		
–	25	Ekaterina Tkachenko	Russian Ski Federation	DNF		
–	38	Katie Hensien	United States		DNF	
–	43	Anastasia Gornostaeva	Russian Ski Federation	DNF		
–	47	Miho Mizutani	Japan	DNF		
–	50	Sarah Woodward	Great Britain		DNF	

== Elimination round ==
1/8 finals
1	(Switzerland) Wendy Holdener
16	(United States) Nina O'Brien	+0.19
8	(Austria) Stephanie Brunner	+0.14
9	(United States) Paula Moltzan
5	(Poland) Maryna Gąsienica-Daniel
12	(Sweden) Estelle Alphand	+0.09
4	(Austria) Katharina Liensberger
13	(United Kingdom) Alexandra Tilley	+0.77
3	(Slovenia) Tina Robnik
14	(New Zealand) Piera Hudson	+0.62
6	(France) Coralie Frasse Sombet	+0.56
11	(France) Tessa Worley
7	(Germany) Andrea Filser	+0.43
10	(Italy) Federica Brignone
2	(Slovenia) Meta Hrovat	+0.81
15	(Italy) Marta Bassino

Quarterfinals
1	(Switzerland) Wendy Holdener	+0.36
9	(United States) Paula Moltzan
5	(Poland) Maryna Gąsienica-Daniel	+0.45
4	(Austria) Katharina Liensberger
3	(Slovenia) Tina Robnik	+0.26
11	(France) Tessa Worley
10	(Italy) Federica Brignone	+0.12
15	(Italy) Marta Bassino

Semifinals
9	(United States) Paula Moltzan	+1.47
4	(Austria) Katharina Liensberger
11	(France) Tessa Worley	+0.00
15	(Italy) Marta Bassino

Final
4	(Austria) Katharina Liensberger	+0.00
15	(Italy) Marta Bassino
Third place
9	(United States) Paula Moltzan	+1.18
11	(France) Tessa Worley
