= Kim Vanreusel =

Belgian alpine skier (born 1998)

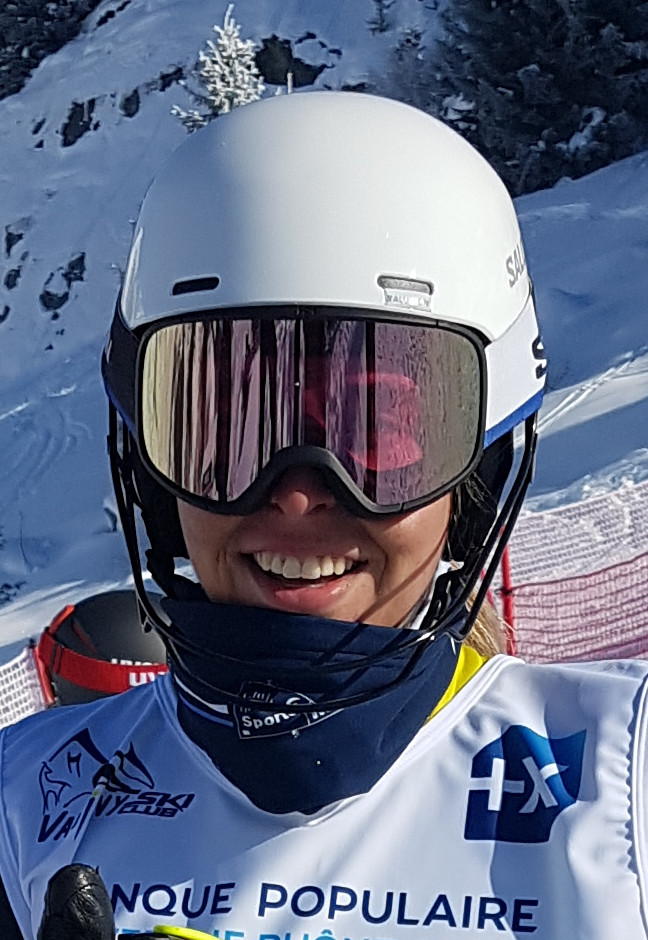
- Vanreusel in 2023

Personal information
- Born: 4 January 1998 (age 28) Antwerp, Belgium

Skiing career
- Country: Belgium
- Sport: Alpine skiing
- Club: Club de ski Val de Wanne
- Disciplines: Giant slalom, slalom
- World Cup debut: 11 November 2017 (age 19)

Olympics
- Teams: 2 – (2018, 2026)
- Medals: 0

World Championships
- Teams: 5 – (2017–2025)
- Medals: 0

World Cup
- Seasons: 8 – (2018, 2020–2026)
- Podiums: 0
- Overall titles: 0
- Discipline titles: 0

Kim Vanreusel (born 4 January 1998) is a Belgian World Cup alpine ski racer. She competed in all five individual events contested at the 2018 Winter Olympics and in the slalom at the 2026 Winter Olympics.

== World Championships results ==
Year
Year	Age	Slalom	Giant slalom	Super-G	Downhill	Combined	Team combined	Parallel	Team event
2017	19	42	54	—	—	—	—N/a	—N/a	9
2019	21	32	47	—	—	—	—N/a	—N/a	9
2021	23	29	DNF1	—	—	—	—N/a	DNQ	15
2023	25	DNF2	33	—	—	—	—N/a	—	12
2025	27	DNF1	35	—	—	—N/a	—	—N/a	—

== Olympic results ==
Year
Year	Age	Slalom	Giant slalom	Super-G	Downhill	Combined	Team combined
2018	20	40	39	40	30	DNF1	—N/a
2026	28	34	—	—	—	—N/a	—
