= 2022 Alpine Skiing World Cup – Women's overall =

Alpine ski discipline year standings

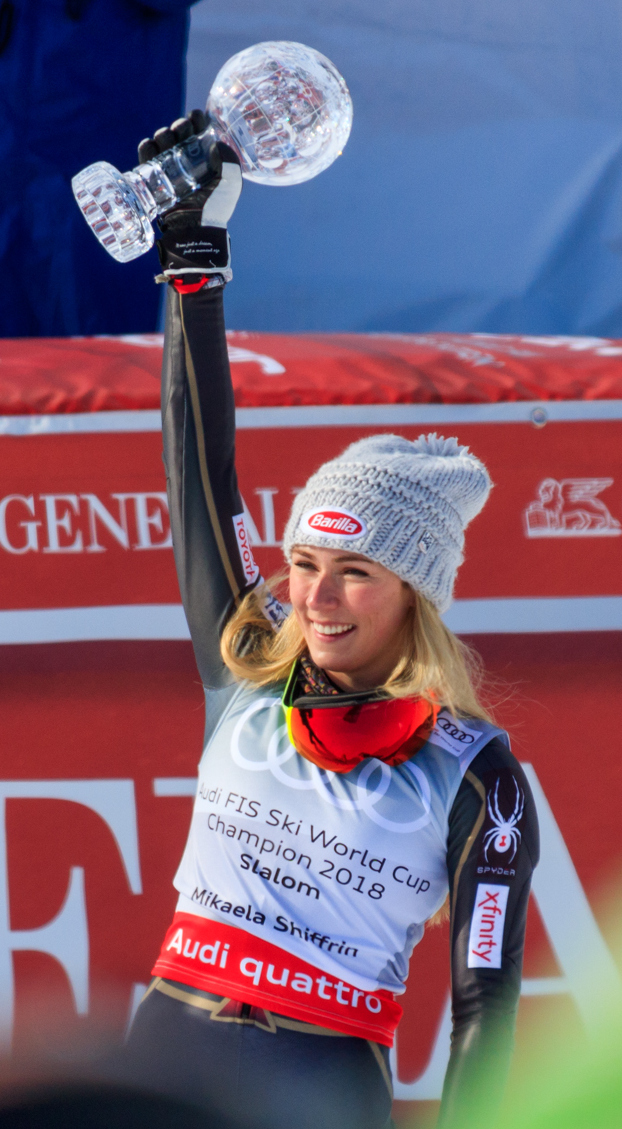
2022 women's overall World Cup: Mikaela Shiffrin of the United States, season champion for the fourth time; 2022 women's World Cup; Overall • downhill • super-g; giant slalom • slalom • parallel
Previous: 2021	Next: 2023

The women's overall in the 2022 FIS Alpine Skiing World Cup consisted of 37 events in 5 disciplines: downhill (DH), Super-G (SG), giant slalom (GS), slalom (SL), and parallel (PAR). The sixth discipline, Alpine combined (AC), had all of its events in the 2021–22 season cancelled due to the continuing schedule disruption cased by the COVID-19 pandemic, which also happened in 2020-21. In an adjustment that was partially motivated by the pandemic, each of the four main disciplines had nine races, while the parallel discipline had only one. The season did not have any cancellations.

The season was interrupted by the 2022 Winter Olympics in Beijing, China (at the Yanqing National Alpine Skiing Centre in Yanqing District) from 6–19 February 2022.

In the 35th event of the season, with just two events in the finals remaining, three-time overall champion Mikaela Shiffrin of the United States clinched her fourth championship, building an insurmountable 236-point lead over defending overall champion Petra Vlhová of Slovakia. Although Shiffrin had a huge lead early in the season, she then had a bout with COVID and also skipped several races both while preparing for and then immediately after the Winter Olympics, giving Vlhová a chance to catch up (of which she took advantage). However, Shiffrin re-established her lead in the first events in March. After Vlhová closed to 56 points, Shiffrin won the downhill at the World Cup finals, an event in which she rarely competes, to re-establish a triple-digit lead, and her second place in the next day's Super-G clinched Shiffrin's fourth overall title, drawing her even with Lindsey Vonn and behind only Annemarie Moser-Pröll, who won six, among women.

The last events of the season took place at the World Cup final, Wednesday, 16 March through Sunday, 20 March in the linked resorts of Courchevel and Méribel, France, which are located in Les Trois Vallées. Only the top 25 in each specific discipline for the season and the winner of the Junior World Championship in each discipline were eligible to compete in the final, with the exception that athletes who have scored at least 500 points in the overall classification were eligible to participate in any discipline, regardless of their standing in that discipline for the season.

== Standings ==
#	Skier	DH; 9 races	SG; 9 races	GS; 9 races	SL; 9 races	PAR; 1 race	Total
	(United States) Mikaela Shiffrin	105	380	507	501	0	1,493
2	(Slovakia) Petra Vlhová	22	26	491	770	0	1,309
3	(Italy) Federica Brignone	209	506	316	24	0	1,055
4	(Norway) Ragnhild Mowinckel	274	353	253	0	0	880
5	(Switzerland) Michelle Gisin	184	196	247	247	0	874
6	(Italy) Sofia Goggia	504	332	37	0	0	873
7	(Sweden) Sara Hector	0	0	540	175	45	782
8	(France) Tessa Worley	0	180	567	0	0	747
9	(Switzerland) Corinne Suter	407	277	13	0	0	697
10	(Italy) Marta Bassino	27	240	356	0	50	673
11	(Switzerland) Lara Gut-Behrami	208	286	154	0	16	664
12	(Austria) Ramona Siebenhofer	331	165	140	0	0	636
13	(Italy) Elena Curtoni	168	390	27	0	0	585
14	(Switzerland) Wendy Holdener	6	76	74	357	0	513
15	(Austria) Katharina Liensberger	0	0	104	392	15	511
16	(Austria) Mirjam Puchner	296	206	0	0	0	502
17	(Germany) Lena Dürr	0	0	0	437	36	473
18	(France) Romane Miradoli	149	275	20	0	0	444
19	(Czech Republic) Ester Ledecká	339	104	0	0	0	443
20	(Austria) Katharina Truppe	0	0	203	219	11	433
21	(Austria) Cornelia Hütter	221	178	0	0	0	399
	(Austria) Tamara Tippler	114	285	0	0	0	399
23	(Slovenia) Andreja Slokar	0	0	58	225	100	383
24	(Switzerland) Joana Hählen	219	159	0	0	0	378
25	(Slovenia) Ana Bucik	0	0	99	277	0	376
26	(Switzerland) Jasmine Flury	179	173	0	0	0	352
27	(Germany) Kira Weidle	224	119	0	0	0	343
28	(United States) Breezy Johnson	240	82	0	0	0	322
29	(Switzerland) Priska Nufer	257	47	0	0	0	304
30	(Norway) Mina Fürst Holtmann	0	0	114	173	0	287
31	(Austria) Christine Scheyer	237	47	0	0	0	284
32	(Austria) Ariane Rädler	114	163	0	0	0	277
33	(Poland) Maryna Gasienica-Daniel	0	23	219	0	24	266
34	(Italy) Nadia Delago	246	18	0	0	0	264
35	(Norway) Thea Louise Stjernesund	0	0	116	60	80	256
36	(Canada) Marie-Michèle Gagnon	177	71	0	0	0	248
37	(France) Laura Gauché	86	152	0	0	0	238
38	(Switzerland) Camille Rast	0	0	119	106	6	231
39	(United States) Paula Moltzan	0	0	101	122	0	223
40	(Norway) Maria Therese Tviberg	0	0	115	95	7	217
41	(Sweden) Anna Swenn-Larsson	0	0	0	208	0	208
42	(Austria) Katharina Huber	0	0	63	131	0	194
43	(France) Coralie Frasse Sombet	0	0	167	0	26	193
44	(New Zealand) Alice Robinson	0	133	44	0	0	177
45	(Canada) Ali Nullmeyer	0	0	0	175	0	175
46	(Austria) Stephanie Venier	129	41	0	0	0	170
47	(Austria) Nadine Fest	71	96	0	0	0	167
48	(Austria) Ricarda Haaser	1	38	127	0	0	166
49	(Canada) Valérie Grenier	0	0	159	0	0	159
50	(Austria) Elisabeth Reisinger	111	40	0	0	0	151
51	(Croatia) Leona Popović	0	0	0	146	0	146
52	(Canada) Laurence St. Germain	0	0	0	139	0	139
53	(Italy) Nicol Delago	94	44	0	0	0	138
	(Slovenia) Ilka Štuhec	138	0	0	0	0	138
55	(Slovenia) Meta Hrovat	0	0	110	21	0	131
56	(Austria) Katharina Gallhuber	0	0	0	122	3	125
57	(Czech Republic) Martina Dubovská	0	0	0	124	0	124

- Leader
- 2nd place
- 3rd place
- Updated at 20 March 2022, after all events

== See also ==
- 2022 Alpine Skiing World Cup – Women's summary rankings
- 2022 Alpine Skiing World Cup – Women's downhill
- 2022 Alpine Skiing World Cup – Women's super-G
- 2022 Alpine Skiing World Cup – Women's giant slalom
- 2022 Alpine Skiing World Cup – Women's slalom
- 2022 Alpine Skiing World Cup – Women's parallel
- 2022 Alpine Skiing World Cup – Men's overall
- World Cup scoring system
