= FIS Alpine World Ski Championships 2023 – Women's slalom =

FIS Alpine World Ski Championships 2023 at the Women's slalom
- Venue: Roc de Fer
- Location: Courchevel and Méribel, France
- Dates: 18 February
- Competitors: 120 from 51 nations
- Winning time: 1:43.15

Medalists
gold medal	Laurence St-Germain	Canada
silver medal	Mikaela Shiffrin	United States
bronze medal	Lena Dürr	Germany

The Women's slalom competition at the FIS Alpine World Ski Championships 2023 was held at Roc de Fer ski course in Méribel on 18 February 2023.

In a shocking result, Laurence St-Germain won gold, beating Shiffrin.

== Results ==
The first run was started at 10:00 and the second run at 13:30.

Rank	Bib	Name	Nation	Run 1	Rank	Run 2	Rank	Total	Diff
1st place, gold medalist(s)	18	Laurence St-Germain	Canada	53.15	3	50.00	6	1:43.15	
2nd place, silver medalist(s)	1	Mikaela Shiffrin	United States	52.54	1	51.18	29	1:43.72	+0.57
3rd place, bronze medalist(s)	6	Lena Dürr	Germany	53.46	4	50.38	16	1:43.84	+0.69
4	19	Mina Fürst Holtmann	Norway	54.03	10	49.83	4	1:43.86	+0.71
5	5	Petra Vlhová	Slovakia	53.53	5	50.47	18	1:44.00	+0.85
6	27	Aline Danioth	Switzerland	53.99	9	50.13	9	1:44.12	+0.97
7	14	Sara Hector	Sweden	54.12	11	50.15	11	1:44.27	+1.12
8	35	Lara Della Mea	Italy	54.86	26	49.48	1	1:44.34	+1.19
9	2	Ana Bucik	Slovenia	53.77	6	50.60	20	1:44.37	+1.22
10	12	Hanna Aronsson Elfman	Sweden	53.95	8	50.51	19	1:44.46	+1.31
11	23	Katharina Huber	Austria	54.41	15	50.06	8	1:44.47	+1.32
12	9	Ali Nullmeyer	Canada	54.47	18	50.01	7	1:44.48	+1.33
13	16	Thea Louise Stjernesund	Norway	54.51	20	49.98	5	1:44.49	+1.34
13	11	Franziska Gritsch	Austria	54.99	30	49.50	2	1:44.49	+1.34
15	24	Nastasia Noens	France	54.84	25	49.79	3	1:44.63	+1.48
16	42	Marie Lamure	France	54.50	19	50.29	14	1:44.79	+1.64
17	3	Leona Popović	Croatia	54.16	12	50.65	21	1:44.81	+1.66
18	15	Katharina Truppe	Austria	54.66	22	50.26	13	1:44.92	+1.77
19	30	Kristin Lysdahl	Norway	54.88	27	50.14	10	1:45.02	+1.87
20	13	Katharina Liensberger	Austria	54.24	14	50.81	26	1:45.05	+1.90
21	28	Neja Dvornik	Slovenia	54.43	16	50.68	24	1:45.11	+1.96
21	25	Emma Aicher	Germany	54.22	13	50.89	27	1:45.11	+1.96
23	32	Marta Rossetti	Italy	54.97	29	50.19	12	1:45.16	+2.01
24	22	Amelia Smart	Canada	54.44	17	50.75	25	1:45.19	+2.04
25	34	Chiara Pogneaux	France	54.93	28	50.32	15	1:45.25	+2.10
26	37	Katie Hensien	United States	54.83	24	50.43	17	1:45.26	+2.11
27	21	Camille Rast	Switzerland	54.62	21	50.66	23	1:45.28	+2.13
28	43	Asa Ando	Japan	55.04	31	50.65	21	1:45.69	+2.54
29	38	Dženifera Ģērmane	Latvia	54.82	23	51.19	31	1:46.01	+2.86
30	36	Beatrice Sola	Italy	55.08	32	51.02	28	1:46.10	+2.95
31	31	Charlie Guest	Great Britain	55.53	38	51.18	29	1:46.71	+3.56
32	29	Andrea Filser	Germany	55.45	37	51.62	32	1:47.07	+3.92
33	49	Kiara Derks	Netherlands	56.02	42	52.63	34	1:48.65	+5.50
34	52	Anja Oplotnik	Slovenia	56.50	45	52.99	35	1:49.49	+6.34
35	40	Anita Gulli	Italy	58.00	50	51.81	33	1:49.81	+6.66
36	53	Victoria Palla	Great Britain	57.00	48	53.42	36	1:50.42	+7.27
37	55	Noa Szőllős	Israel	58.40	51	53.66	37	1:52.06	+8.91
38	61	Liene Bondare	Latvia	57.83	49	54.82	38	1:52.65	+9.50
39	58	Gwyneth ten Raa	Luxembourg	58.49	52	55.10	39	1:53.59	+10.44
40	73	Mida Fah Jaiman	Thailand	59.24	57	55.16	40	1:54.40	+11.25
41	72	Mialitiana Clerc	Madagascar	59.25	58	55.54	41	1:54.79	+11.64
42	64	Szonja Hozmann	Hungary	59.23	56	55.70	42	1:54.93	+11.78
43	74	Maria Constantin	Romania	58.88	54	56.90	43	1:55.78	+12.63
	4	Wendy Holdener	Switzerland	52.73	2	Did not finish			
	8	Zrinka Ljutić	Croatia	53.83	7	Did not finish			
	33	Doriane Escané	France	55.09	33	Did not finish			
	26	Jessica Hilzinger	Germany	55.23	36	Did not finish			
	54	Adriana Jelinkova	Czech Republic	55.95	40	Did not finish			
	50	Kim Vanreusel	Belgium	55.97	41	Did not finish			
	44	Ava Sunshine	United States	56.04	43	Did not finish			
	48	Elese Sommerová	Czech Republic	56.49	44	Did not finish			
	47	Reece Bell	Great Britain	56.76	46	Did not finish			
	63	Kristiane Rør Madsen	Denmark	58.63	53	Did not finish			
	7	Anna Swenn-Larsson	Sweden	59.14	55	Did not finish			
	60	Mikayla Smyth	New Zealand	59.56	59	Did not finish			
	20	Maria Therese Tviberg	Norway	55.18	34	Did not start			
	10	Michelle Gisin	Switzerland	55.23	35	Did not start			
	17	Martina Dubovská	Czech Republic	55.65	39	Did not start			
	46	Nika Tomšič	Slovenia	56.89	47	Did not start			
	56	Petra Hromcová	Slovakia	59.75	60	Did not start			
	69	Luisa Bertani	Bulgaria	1:00.14	61	Did not qualify			
	67	Julia Zlatkova	Bulgaria	1:00.20	62	Did not qualify			
	62	Naya Van Puyvelde	Belgium	1:00.21	63	Did not qualify			
	68	Anastasiia Shepilenko	Ukraine	1:00.39	64	Did not qualify			
	59	Katla Björg Dagbjartsdóttir	Iceland	1:00.96	65	Did not qualify			
	79	Brigitta Junia	Hungary	1:01.92	66	Did not qualify			
	85	Manon Ouiass	Lebanon	1:02.81	67	Did not qualify			
	82	Elise Pellegrin	Malta	1:03.23	68	Did not qualify			
	76	Hanna Majtényi	Hungary	1:03.45	69	Did not qualify			
	80	Lirika Deva	Kosovo	1:03.63	70	Did not qualify			
	86	Maria Nikoleta Kaltsogianni	Greece	1:03.87	71	Did not qualify			
	95	Ioana Corlățeanu	Romania	1:04.53	72	Did not qualify			
	89	Samanta Līcīte	Latvia	1:04.87	73	Did not qualify			
	83	Tess Arbez	Ireland	1:04.92	74	Did not qualify			
	90	Diana Andreea Renţea	Romania	1:05.30	75	Did not qualify			
	87	Tīna Namsone	Latvia	1:05.59	76	Did not qualify			
	81	Nikolina Dragoljević	Bosnia and Herzegovina	1:07.47	77	Did not qualify			
	101	Zhang Dingyue	China	1:08.58	78	Did not qualify			
	88	Ariana Haben Ribeiro	Portugal	1:08.80	79	Did not qualify			
	98	Lee Wen-yi	Chinese Taipei	1:09.76	80	Did not qualify			
	110	Pan Yu	China	1:10.64	81	Did not qualify			
	122	Enxhi Sefaj	Kosovo	1:10.70	82	Did not qualify			
	96	Maryam Kiashemshaki	Iran	1:11.02	83	Did not qualify			
	99	Carlie Maria Iskandar	Lebanon	1:11.25	84	Did not qualify			
	107	Luo Mingxiu	China	1:11.61	85	Did not qualify			
	97	Marjan Kalhor	Iran	1:12.30	86	Did not qualify			
	118	Ma Yongqi	China	1:12.50	87	Did not qualify			
	78	Ornella Oettl Reyes	Peru	1:12.72	88	Did not qualify			
	112	Valeriya Kovaleva	Uzbekistan	1:13.50	89	Did not qualify			
	109	Sara Zeidan	Lebanon	1:15.26	90	Did not qualify			
	102	Zahra Alizadeh	Iran	1:15.53	91	Did not qualify			
	116	Arba Pupovci	Kosovo	1:16.14	92	Did not qualify			
	114	Chloe Amelia Elsa Cornu-Wong	Hong Kong	1:16.99	93	Did not qualify			
	100	Sadaf Saveh-Shemshaki	Iran	1:17.43	94	Did not qualify			
	120	Chiara Di Camillo	Albania	1:20.58	95	Did not qualify			
	108	Sandhya Sandhya	India	1:21.83	96	Did not qualify			
	113	Nicole Samaha	Lebanon	1:21.92	97	Did not qualify			
	106	Aanchal Thakur	India	1:22.55	98	Did not qualify			
	121	Celine Marti	Haiti	1:35.19	99	Did not qualify			
	39	Alexandra Tilley	Great Britain	Did not finish					
	41	Nina O'Brien	United States	Did not finish					
	45	Zita Tóth	Hungary	Did not finish					
	51	Erika Pykäläinen	Finland	Did not finish					
	57	Celine Sommerová	Czech Republic	Did not finish					
	66	Yuliia Makovetska	Ukraine	Did not finish					
	70	Ida Sofie Bunsov Brøns	Denmark	Did not finish					
	71	Maria-Eleni Tsiovolou	Greece	Did not finish					
	75	Joyce ten Raa	Luxembourg	Did not finish					
	77	Jana Atanasovska	North Macedonia	Did not finish					
	84	Maja Tadić	Bosnia and Herzegovina	Did not finish					
	91	Iva Nikolić	Serbia	Did not finish					
	92	Gabija Šinkūnaitė	Lithuania	Did not finish					
	93	Kiana Kryezu	Kosovo	Did not finish					
	94	Teodora Filipović	Bosnia and Herzegovina	Did not finish					
	103	Thaleia Armeni	Cyprus	Did not finish					
	104	Maria Aikaterina Papastathi	Greece	Did not finish					
	105	Evridiki Dimitrof	Greece	Did not finish					
	111	Rano Imonkulova	Uzbekistan	Did not finish					
	115	Olga Paliutkina	Kyrgyzstan	Did not finish					
	119	Albina Ivanova	Kyrgyzstan	Did not finish					
	65	Nino Tsiklauri	Georgia	Did not start					
	117	Ester Bako	Albania	Did not start					
