= FIS Alpine World Ski Championships 2023 – Women's parallel giant slalom =

FIS Alpine World Ski Championships 2023 at the Women's parallel giant slalom
- Venue: Roc de Fer
- Location: Courchevel and Méribel, France
- Dates: 14 February (qualification); 15 February
- Competitors: 41 from 18 nations

Medalists
gold medal	Maria Therese Tviberg	Norway
silver medal	Wendy Holdener	Switzerland
bronze medal	Thea Louise Stjernesund	Norway

The Women's parallel giant slalom competition at the FIS Alpine World Ski Championships 2023 was held at Roc de Fer ski course in Méribel on 14 and 15 February 2023.

== Qualification ==
The qualification was started on 14 February at 17:30.

Rank	Bib	Name	Country	Red course	Blue course	Notes
1	1	Thea Louise Stjernesund	Norway	33.40 (1)		Q
2	4	Sara Hector	Sweden		33.57 (1)	Q
3	3	Marta Bassino	Italy	33.69 (2)		Q
4	5	Lena Dürr	Germany	33.92 (3)		Q
5	17	Wendy Holdener	Switzerland	33.97 (4)		Q
6	12	Clara Direz	France		34.02 (2)	Q
6	7	Maryna Gąsienica-Daniel	Poland	34.02 (5)		Q
8	2	Kristin Lysdahl	Norway		34.09 (3)	Q
9	15	Franziska Gritsch	Austria	34.11 (6)		Q
10	8	Andrea Ellenberger	Switzerland		34.12 (4)	Q
11	6	Coralie Frasse Sombet	France		34.20 (5)	Q
12	16	Nina O'Brien	United States		34.25 (6)	Q
13	13	Maria Therese Tviberg	Norway	34.30 (7)		Q
14	11	Estelle Alphand	Sweden	34.31 (8)		Q
15	34	Marie Lamure	France		34.43 (7)	Q
16	14	Camille Rast	Switzerland		34.46 (8)	Q
17	25	Neja Dvornik	Slovenia	34.49 (9)		
18	35	Ava Sunshine	United States	34.51 (10)		
18	37	Adriana Jelinkova	Czech Republic	34.51 (10)		
20	9	Katharina Liensberger	Austria	34.52 (12)		
21	20	Ricarda Haaser	Austria		34.62 (9)	
22	19	Hanna Aronsson Elfman	Sweden	34.72 (13)		
23	23	Aline Danioth	Switzerland	34.93 (14)		
24	32	Katie Hensien	United States		35.12 (10)	
25	44	Kim Vanreusel	Belgium		35.21 (11)	
26	24	Asja Zenere	Italy		35.28 (12)	
27	28	Chiara Pogneaux	France		35.30 (13)	
28	21	Martina Dubovská	Czech Republic	35.38 (15)		
29	43	Rebeka Jančová	Slovakia	35.41 (16)		
30	42	Kiara Derks	Netherlands		35.61 (14)	
31	41	Zuzanna Czapska	Poland	35.64 (17)		
31	38	Nika Tomšič	Slovenia		35.64 (15)	
33	22	Katharina Huber	Austria		35.65 (16)	
34	30	Luisa Bertani	Bulgaria		35.84 (17)	
35	40	Noa Szőllős	Israel		36.71 (18)	
36	36	Erika Pykalainen	Finland		37.04 (19)	
	10	Andrea Filser	Germany		DNF	
	26	Jessica Hilzinger	Germany		DNF	
	27	Julia Scheib	Austria	DNF		
	39	Elese Sommerová	Czech Republic	DNF		
	45	Anastasiia Shepilenko	Ukraine	DNF		
	18	Paula Moltzan	United States		DNS	
	29	Lara Della Mea	Italy	DNS		
	31	Beatrice Sola	Italy	DNS		
	33	Magdalena Łuczak	Poland	DNS		

== Elimination round ==
The finals were started on 15 February at 12:00-

1/8 finals
1	(Norway) Thea Louise Stjernesund
16	(Switzerland) Camille Rast	+0.40
8	(Switzerland) Andrea Ellenberger	+0.22
9	(Poland) Maryna Gąsienica-Daniel
5	(Germany) Lena Dürr
12	(United States) Nina O'Brien	+0.05
4	(France) Clara Direz	DNF
13	(Norway) Maria Therese Tviberg
3	(Italy) Marta Bassino	+0.40
14	(France) Marie Lamure
6	(Norway) Kristin Lysdahl	+0.18
11	(Austria) Franziska Gritsch
7	(Switzerland) Wendy Holdener
10	(France) Coralie Frasse Sombet	+0.13
2	(Sweden) Sara Hector
15	(Sweden) Estelle Alphand	+0.89

Quarterfinals
1	(Norway) Thea Louise Stjernesund
9	(Poland) Maryna Gąsienica-Daniel	+0.33
5	(Germany) Lena Dürr	+0.11
13	(Norway) Maria Therese Tviberg
14	(France) Marie Lamure
11	(Austria) Franziska Gritsch	+0.24
7	(Switzerland) Wendy Holdener
2	(Sweden) Sara Hector	+0.37

Semifinals
1	(Norway) Thea Louise Stjernesund	+0.06
13	(Norway) Maria Therese Tviberg
14	(France) Marie Lamure	DNF
7	(Switzerland) Wendy Holdener

Final
13	(Norway) Maria Therese Tviberg
7	(Switzerland) Wendy Holdener	+0.67
Third place
1	(Norway) Thea Louise Stjernesund
14	(France) Marie Lamure	DNF
