= Kristin Lysdahl =

Norwegian alpine skier

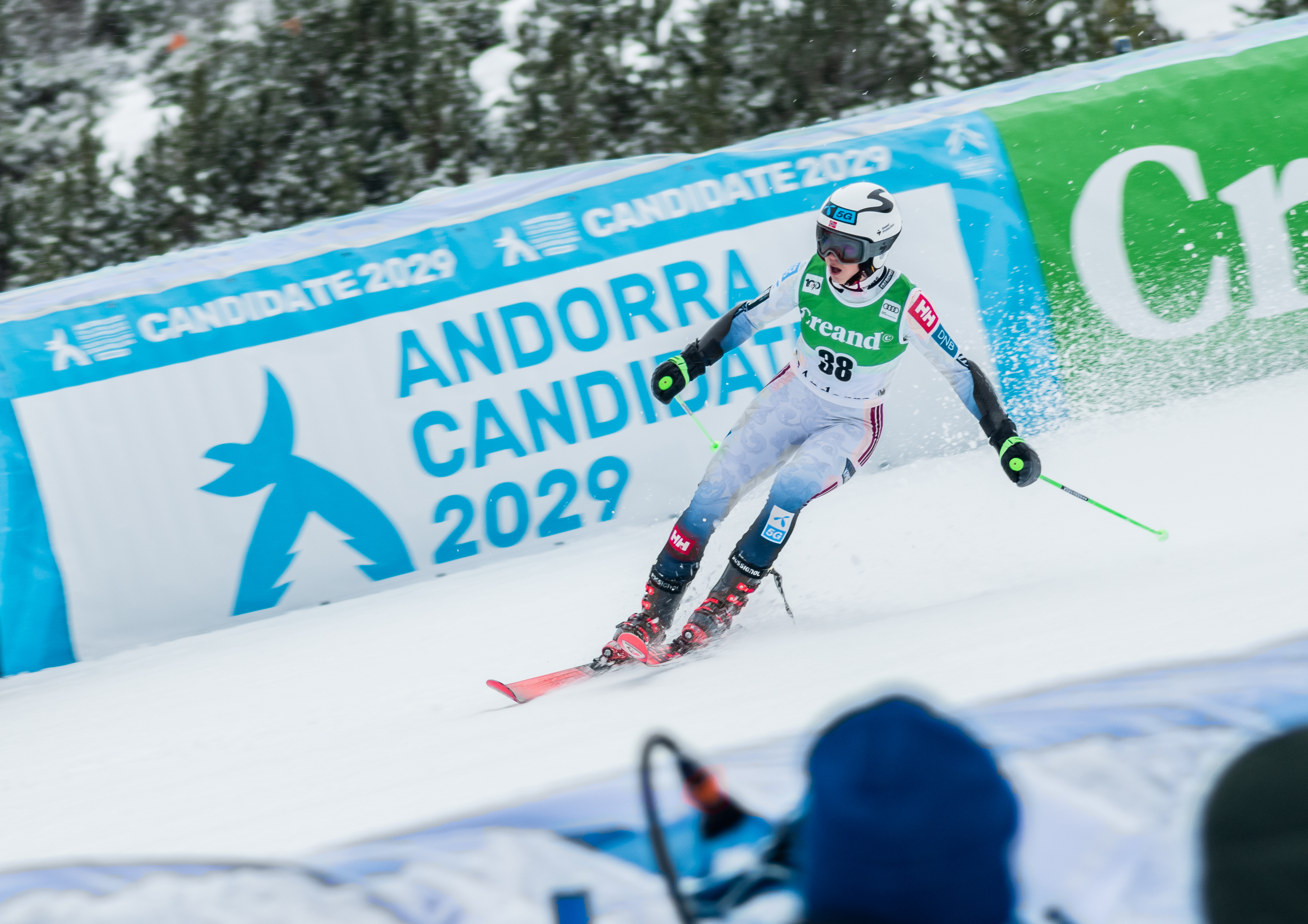
- Lysdahl in 2024

Personal information
- Born: 29 June 1996 (age 30) Bærum, Norway
- Height: 1.68 m (5 ft 6 in)

Skiing career
- Sport: Alpine skiing
- Club: Asker SK
- Disciplines: Giant slalom, Slalom, Combined, Downhill, Super-G
- World Cup debut: 27 December 2016 (age 19)

Olympics
- Teams: 1 – (2018)
- Medals: 1 (0 gold)

World Championships
- Teams: 4 – (2017–2023)
- Medals: 2 (1 gold)

World Cup
- Seasons: 9 – (2017–2025)
- Wins: 0
- Podiums: 1 – (1 PG)
- Overall titles: 0 – (20th in 2019)
- Discipline titles: 0 – (7th in SL, 2021)
Medal record
Women's alpine skiing
Representing Norway
Olympic Games
Bronze medal – third place	2018 Pyeongchang	Team event
World Championships
Gold medal – first place	2021 Cortina d’Ampezzo	Team event
Silver medal – second place	2023 Méribel	Team event

Kristin Lysdahl (born 29 June 1996) is a Norwegian World Cup alpine ski racer. She competes in all disciplines, but focuses on the technical events of Giant slalom and Slalom. She has competed in three World Championships and the 2018 Winter Olympics.

== Personal life ==
Lysdahl was born in Bærum on 29 June 1996.

== Career ==
Competing at the 2018 Winter Olympics, Lysdahl won a bronze medal in the mixed team competition, along with Nina Haver-Løseth, Maren Skjøld, Sebastian Foss Solevåg, Leif Kristian Nestvold-Haugen and Jonathan Nordbotten. She placed 18th in giant slalom and 25th in slalom at the 2018 Winter Olympics.

Lysdahl became national champion in super combination (separate downhill and slalom events) in 2017, and in slalom in 2019 (shared with Maren Skjøld).

== World Cup results ==
=== Season standings ===
Season	Age	Overall	Slalom	Giant slalom	Super-G	Downhill	Combined	Parallel
2017	20	98	—	37	—	—	—	—N/a
2018	21	60	52	24	—	—	—	—N/a
2019	22	20	10	16	—	—	—	—N/a
2020	23	35	13	40	—	—	—	7
2021	24	23	7	40	—	—	—N/a	15
2022	25	74	51	—	—	—	—N/a	3
2023	26	96	40	—	—	—	—N/a	—N/a
2024	27	65	37	37	—	—	—N/a	—N/a
2025	28	101	—	45	—	—	—N/a	—N/a

Standings through 27 March 2025

=== Race podiums ===
- 1 podium – (1 PG), 20 top tens

Season	Date	Location	Discipline	Place
2022	13 Nov 2021	Lech/Zürs, Austria	Parallel-G	3rd

== World Championship results ==
Year	Age	Slalom	Giant slalom	Super-G	Downhill	Combined	Parallel	Team event
2017	20	—	23	27	24	17	—N/a	5
2019	22	DNF2	20	—	—	—	—N/a	5
2021	24	7	16	—	—	—	BQLF	1
2023	26	19	—	—	—	—	13	2

== Olympic results ==
Year	Age	Slalom	Giant slalom	Super-G	Downhill	Combined	Team event
2018	21	25	18	—	—	—	3
