= FIS Alpine World Ski Championships 2023 – Women's giant slalom =

FIS Alpine World Ski Championships 2023 at the Women's giant slalom
- Venue: Roc de Fer
- Location: Méribel, France
- Dates: 16 February
- Competitors: 114 from 52 nations
- Winning time: 2:07.13

Medalists
gold medal	Mikaela Shiffrin	United States
silver medal	Federica Brignone	Italy
bronze medal	Ragnhild Mowinckel	Norway

Women's Giant Slalom
- Location: Roc de Fer; Méribel, France
- Vertical: 378 m (1,240 ft)
- Top elevation: 1,830 m (6,004 ft)
- Base elevation: 1,452 m (4,764 ft)

The Women's giant slalom competition at the FIS Alpine World Ski Championships 2023 was held at Roc de Fer ski course in Méribel on 16 February 2023.

== Results ==
The first run was started at 09:45 and the second run at 13:30.

Rank	Bib	Name	Nation	Run 1	Rank	Run 2	Rank	Total	Diff
1st place, gold medalist(s)	3	Mikaela Shiffrin	United States	1:02.54	1	1:04.59	12	2:07.13	
2nd place, silver medalist(s)	7	Federica Brignone	Italy	1:02.85	3	1:04.40	9	2:07.25	+0.12
3rd place, bronze medalist(s)	14	Ragnhild Mowinckel	Norway	1:03.25	5	1:04.10	5	2:07.35	+0.22
4	5	Lara Gut-Behrami	Switzerland	1:03.18	4	1:04.26	6	2:07.44	+0.31
5	6	Marta Bassino	Italy	1:04.00	13	1:03.93	3	2:07.93	+0.80
6	20	Mina Fürst Holtmann	Norway	1:03.36	6	1:04.69	17	2:08.05	+0.92
7	4	Petra Vlhová	Slovakia	1:03.54	9	1:04.52	10	2:08.06	+0.93
8	12	Thea Louise Stjernesund	Norway	1:04.04	14	1:04.35	8	2:08.39	+1.26
9	9	Coralie Frasse Sombet	France	1:03.78	10	1:04.67	16	2:08.45	+1.32
10	8	Maryna Gąsienica-Daniel	Poland	1:03.53	8	1:04.99	19	2:08.52	+1.39
11	25	Nina O'Brien	United States	1:04.70	21	1:03.86	2	2:08.56	+1.43
12	22	Franziska Gritsch	Austria	1:04.18	15	1:04.65	15	2:08.83	+1.70
13	2	Sara Hector	Sweden	1:03.50	7	1:05.43	24	2:08.93	+1.80
14	24	Camille Rast	Switzerland	1:03.95	12	1:05.17	22	2:09.12	+1.99
15	15	Alice Robinson	New Zealand	1:05.46	28	1:03.85	1	2:09.31	+2.18
16	30	Clara Direz	France	1:04.76	23	1:04.62	14	2:09.38	+2.25
17	36	Zrinka Ljutić	Croatia	1:04.86	24	1:04.54	11	2:09.40	+2.27
18	18	Wendy Holdener	Switzerland	1:04.18	15	1:05.27	23	2:09.45	+2.32
19	23	Maria Therese Tviberg	Norway	1:05.09	25	1:04.61	13	2:09.70	+2.57
20	10	Valérie Grenier	Canada	1:05.70	30	1:04.01	4	2:09.71	+2.58
21	32	Britt Richardson	Canada	1:04.72	22	1:05.05	20	2:09.77	+2.64
22	28	Asja Zenere	Italy	1:04.69	20	1:05.10	21	2:09.79	+2.66
23	41	Katie Hensien	United States	1:05.62	29	1:04.31	7	2:09.93	+2.80
24	19	Katharina Liensberger	Austria	1:05.22	26	1:04.88	18	2:10.10	+2.97
25	11	Ana Bucik	Slovenia	1:03.93	11	1:06.23	28	2:10.16	+3.03
26	27	Estelle Alphand	Sweden	1:04.39	17	1:05.86	27	2:10.25	+3.12
27	29	Neja Dvornik	Slovenia	1:04.66	19	1:05.72	26	2:10.38	+3.25
28	17	Michelle Gisin	Switzerland	1:05.43	27	1:05.47	25	2:10.90	+3.77
29	43	Adriana Jelinkova	Czech Republic	1:05.80	33	1:06.33	29	2:12.13	+5.00
30	42	Erika Pykäläinen	Finland	1:06.17	35	1:06.99	30	2:13.16	+6.03
31	39	Emma Aicher	Germany	1:05.75	32	1:07.46	31	2:13.21	+6.08
32	49	Rebeka Jančová	Slovakia	1:06.32	38	1:07.57	32	2:13.89	+6.76
33	50	Kim Vanreusel	Belgium	1:07.10	39	1:08.06	33	2:15.16	+8.03
34	51	Kiara Derks	Netherlands	1:07.55	41	1:08.37	34	2:15.92	+8.79
35	38	Luisa Bertani	Bulgaria	1:07.32	40	1:08.96	35	2:16.28	+9.15
36	48	Anastasiya Shepilenko	Ukraine	1:07.83	42	1:09.29	36	2:17.12	+9.99
37	53	Gwyneth ten Raa	Luxembourg	1:07.97	43	1:09.53	37	2:17.50	+10.37
38	52	Petra Hromcová	Slovakia	1:09.85	44	1:10.27	39	2:20.12	+12.99
39	58	Mialitiana Clerc	Madagascar	1:10.67	45	1:10.94	40	2:21.61	+14.48
40	56	Zita Tóth	Hungary	1:11.69	49	1:10.04	38	2:21.73	+14.60
41	67	Mida Fah Jaiman	Thailand	1:10.81	46	1:12.58	41	2:23.39	+16.26
42	59	Julia Zlatkova	Bulgaria	1:12.65	52	1:13.13	42	2:25.78	+18.65
43	63	Szonja Hozmann	Hungary	1:11.47	47	1:14.84	45	2:26.31	+19.18
44	70	Maria Constantin	Romania	1:12.78	53	1:14.09	43	2:26.87	+19.74
45	71	Maria-Eleni Tsiovolou	Greece	1:13.23	54	1:15.13	46	2:28.36	+21.23
46	57	Ida Sofie Bunsov Brøns	Denmark	1:13.72	55	1:14.78	44	2:28.50	+21.37
47	64	Diana Andreea Renţea	Romania	1:14.18	56	1:15.66	47	2:29.84	+22.71
48	73	Brigitta Junia	Hungary	1:14.98	58	1:16.20	49	2:31.18	+24.05
49	74	Hanna Majtényi	Hungary	1:15.30	59	1:16.19	48	2:31.49	+24.46
50	82	Ioana Corlățeanu	Romania	1:15.97	60	1:17.95	50	2:33.92	+26.79
51	75	Joyce ten Raa	Luxembourg	1:14.34	57	1:24.61	51	2:38.95	+31.82
	1	Tessa Worley	France	1:02.66	2	Did not finish			
	26	Julia Scheib	Austria	1:04.56	18	Did not finish			
	46	Romane Miradoli	France	1:05.73	31	Did not finish			
	34	Alex Tilley	Great Britain	1:06.16	34	Did not finish			
	45	Beatrice Sola	Italy	1:06.29	37	Did not finish			
	62	Ania Monica Caill	Romania	1:11.49	48	Did not finish			
	60	Yuliia Makovetska	Ukraine	1:11.99	51	Did not finish			
	40	Magdalena Łuczak	Poland	1:06.20	36	Did not start			
	54	Nino Tsiklauri	Georgia	1:11.89	50	Did not start			
	85	Frīda Saļņikova	Latvia	1:15.99	61	Did not qualify			
	76	Samanta Līcīte	Latvia	1:16.49	62	Did not qualify			
	65	Manon Ouiass	Lebanon	1:16.92	63	Did not qualify			
	61	Tess Arbez	Ireland	1:17.08	64	Did not qualify			
	93	Élise Pellegrin	Malta	1:17.25	65	Did not qualify			
	94	Maria Nikoleta Kaltsogianni	Greece	1:18.00	66	Did not qualify			
	79	Maja Tadić	Bosnia and Herzegovina	1:18.34	67	Did not qualify			
	109	Carlie Maria Iskandar	Lebanon	1:19.30	68	Did not qualify			
	78	Ariana Haben Ribeiro	Portugal	1:20.46	69	Did not qualify			
	84	Nikolina Dragoljević	Bosnia and Herzegovina	1:21.11	70	Did not qualify			
	80	Kiana Kryeziu	Kosovo	1:21.61	71	Did not qualify			
	88	Lee Wen-yi	Chinese Taipei	1:21.83	72	Did not qualify			
	103	Ester Bako	Albania	1:23.10	73	Did not qualify			
	87	Ma Yongqi	China	1:23.38	74	Did not qualify			
	101	Pan Yu	China	1:26.00	75	Did not qualify			
	92	Christina Tzimpa	Greece	1:26.05	76	Did not qualify			
	112	Olga Paliutkina	Kyrgyzstan	1:26.20	77	Did not qualify			
	100	Teodora Filipović	Bosnia and Herzegovina	1:26.41	78	Did not qualify			
	97	Maryam Kiashemshaki	Iran	1:26.75	79	Did not qualify			
	90	Sadaf Saveh-Shemshaki	Iran	1:27.01	80	Did not qualify			
	107	Sara Zeidan	Lebanon	1:27.02	81	Did not qualify			
	96	Marjan Kalhor	Iran	1:28.93	82	Did not qualify			
	108	Rano Imonkulova	Uzbekistan	1:29.24	83	Did not qualify			
	111	Chloe Cornu-Wong	Hong Kong	1:29.75	84	Did not qualify			
	105	Zahra Alizadeh	Iran	1:30.26	85	Did not qualify			
	104	Enxhi Sefaj	Kosovo	1:32.00	86	Did not qualify			
	102	Thaleia Armeni	Cyprus	1:32.04	87	Did not qualify			
	110	Chiara di Camillo	Albania	1:33.70	88	Did not qualify			
	95	Arba Pupovci	Kosovo	1:33.76	89	Did not qualify			
	106	Nicole Samaha	Lebanon	1:33.82	90	Did not qualify			
	91	Aanchal Thakur	India	1:34.25	91	Did not qualify			
	114	Sandhya Sandhya	India	1:45.23	92	Did not qualify			
	113	Celine Marti	Haiti	2:01.50	93	Did not qualify			
	13	Ricarda Haaser	Austria	Did not finish					
	16	Paula Moltzan	United States	Did not finish					
	21	Andrea Ellenberger	Switzerland	Did not finish					
	31	Kira Weidle	Germany	Did not finish					
	33	Jessica Hilzinger	Germany	Did not finish					
	35	Hilma Lövblom	Sweden	Did not finish					
	37	Hanna Aronsson Elfman	Sweden	Did not finish					
	44	Noa Szőllős	Israel	Did not finish					
	47	Zuzanna Czapska	Poland	Did not finish					
	66	Jana Atanasovska	North Macedonia	Did not finish					
	68	Katla Björg Dagbjartsdóttir	Iceland	Did not finish					
	69	Kristiane Rør Madsen	Denmark	Did not finish					
	72	Liene Bondare	Latvia	Did not finish					
	77	Ornella Oettl Reyes	Peru	Did not finish					
	81	Luo Mingxiu	China	Did not finish					
	83	Iva Nikolić	Serbia	Did not finish					
	86	Zhang Dingyue	China	Did not finish					
	89	Rafailia Palantza	Greece	Did not finish					
	98	Albina Ivanova	Kyrgyzstan	Did not finish					
	99	Valeriya Kovaleva	Uzbekistan	Did not finish					
	55	Sarah Schleper	Mexico	Disqualified					
