= 2021 Alpine Skiing World Cup – Women's overall =

Alpine ski discipline year standings

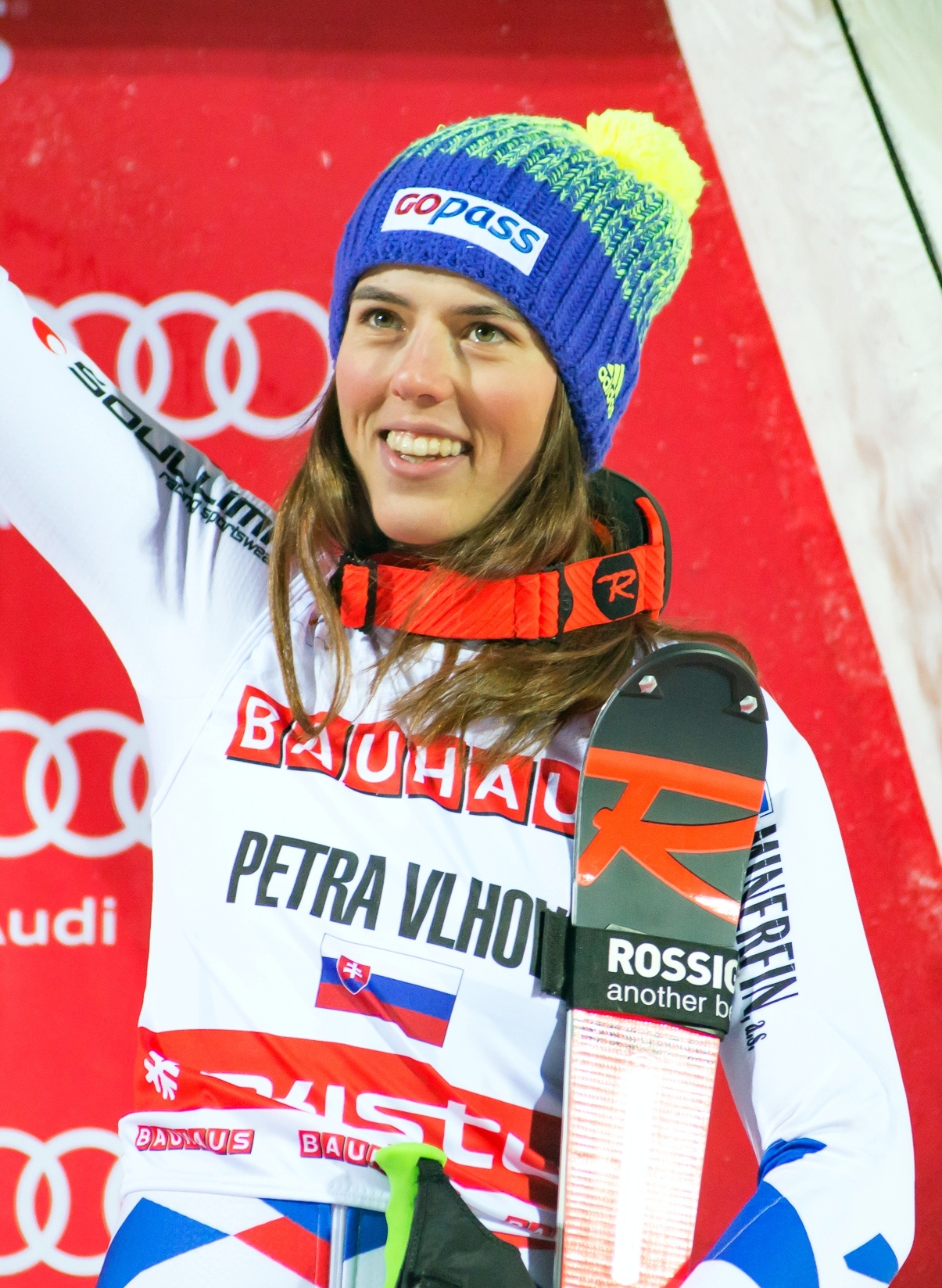
2021 Women's Overall World Cup: Petra Vlhová of Slovakia, season champion; 2021 Women's World Cup; Overall • Downhill • Super-G; Giant slalom • Slalom • Parallel
Previous: 2020	Next: 2022

The women's overall in the 2021 FIS Alpine Skiing World Cup involved 31 events in 5 disciplines: downhill (DH), Super-G (SG), giant slalom (GS), slalom (SL), and parallel (PAR). The sixth discipline, Alpine combined (AC), had all three of its events in the 2020–21 season cancelled, The tentative women's season schedule included 37 events (plus two team parallels, including one to take place at the season finals), but the final women's schedule cut the number of events to 34 (and only one team parallel) due to the continuing disruption cased by the COVID-19 pandemic. Among the changes were the elimination of the three Alpine combined races (Val d'Isére, St. Anton, Crans Montana) to eliminate the mixing of speed skiers and technical skiers in those events, as well as the elimination of two (St. Moritz, Davos) of the three parallels (and one of the team parallels (Lech/Zürs)) in favor of other races. Ultimately, only three of the races in this schedule -- one downhill, one Super-G, and one giant slalom -- were canceled during the season, as discussed later.

In addition to the disruption resulting from the continuing COVID-19 pandemic, the season was interrupted by the 2021 World Ski Championships, which were held from 8–21 February in Cortina d'Ampezzo, Italy.

The last four events of the season were scheduled to take place at the World Cup finals, scheduled for Wednesday, 17 March through Sunday, 21 March in Lenzerheide, Switzerland. Only the top 25 in each specific discipline for the season and the winner of the Junior World Championship are eligible to compete in the finals, with the exception that athletes who have scored at least 500 points in the overall classification are eligible to participate in any discipline, regardless of standing in that discipline for the season.

The season championship was a battle between the two skiers with the most victories on the season (six): the technical ace Petra Vlhová from Slovakia (four slaloms, two giant slaloms) and the speed ace Lara Gut-Behrami from Switzerland (four Super-Gs, two downhills). Heading into the finals, Vlhová had a 93-point lead over Gut-Behrami. Since Gut-Behrami no longer skies in the slalom discipline due to a series of injuries, she needed a strong performance in the two speed races scheduled during the finals, in which she had a predicted advantage over Vlhová, to make up the gap. However, on 17 March, the downhill final (the first event in the finals) had to be cancelled after three days of heavy snowfall. On 18 March, the Super-G final was also cancelled, eliminating both speed finals and providing a distinct edge to a technical skier like Vlhová. And then the bad weather moved out before the slalom finals, and in the that final, Vlhová placed sixth, which gave her 40 points, enough to clinch overall victory before the giant slalom.

== Standings ==
#	Skier	DH; 7 races	SG; 6 races	GS; 8 races	SL; 9 races	PAR; 1 race	Total
	(Slovakia) Petra Vlhová	164	158	342	652	100	1,416
2	(Switzerland) Lara Gut-Behrami	383	525	288	0	60	1,256
3	(Switzerland) Michelle Gisin	143	107	389	491	0	1,130
4	(United States) Mikaela Shiffrin	0	0	420	655	0	1,075
5	(Austria) Katharina Liensberger	0	0	198	690	15	903
6	(Italy) Marta Bassino	44	228	546	13	45	876
7	(Italy) Federica Brignone	96	323	372	40	36	867
8	(Switzerland) Corinne Suter	410	310	33	0	0	753
9	(Italy) Sofia Goggia	480	86	170	0	4	740
10	(Switzerland) Wendy Holdener	0	47	62	415	11	535
11	(Austria) Tamara Tippler	211	272	0	0	0	483
12	(France) Tessa Worley	0	88	391	0	0	479
13	(Czech Republic) Ester Ledecká	206	236	11	0	0	453
14	(Italy) Elena Curtoni	206	136	90	0	0	432
15	(Austria) Ramona Siebenhofer	194	8	173	0	3	378
16	(Sweden) Sara Hector	0	0	196	125	50	371
17	(United States) Breezy Johnson	330	37	0	0	0	367
18	(Norway) Kajsa Vickhoff Lie	179	182	0	0	0	361
19	(New Zealand) Alice Robinson	0	36	278	0	12	326
20	(Germany) Kira Weidle	265	51	0	0	0	316
21	(United States) Paula Moltzan	0	0	38	185	80	303
22	(Italy) Laura Pirovano	220	48	5	0	0	273
23	(Norway) Kristin Lysdahl	0	0	20	227	16	263
24	(Canada) Marie-Michèle Gagnon	128	125	0	0	0	253
25	(Slovenia) Meta Hrovat	0	0	234	8	10	252

- Leader
- 2nd place
- 3rd place
- Updated at 21 March 2021, after all events

== See also ==
- 2021 Alpine Skiing World Cup – Women's summary rankings
- 2021 Alpine Skiing World Cup – Women's downhill
- 2021 Alpine Skiing World Cup – Women's super-G
- 2021 Alpine Skiing World Cup – Women's giant slalom
- 2021 Alpine Skiing World Cup – Women's slalom
- 2021 Alpine Skiing World Cup – Women's parallel
- 2021 Alpine Skiing World Cup – Men's overall
- World Cup scoring system
