= 2021 Alpine Skiing World Cup – Women's super-G =

Alpine ski discipline year standings

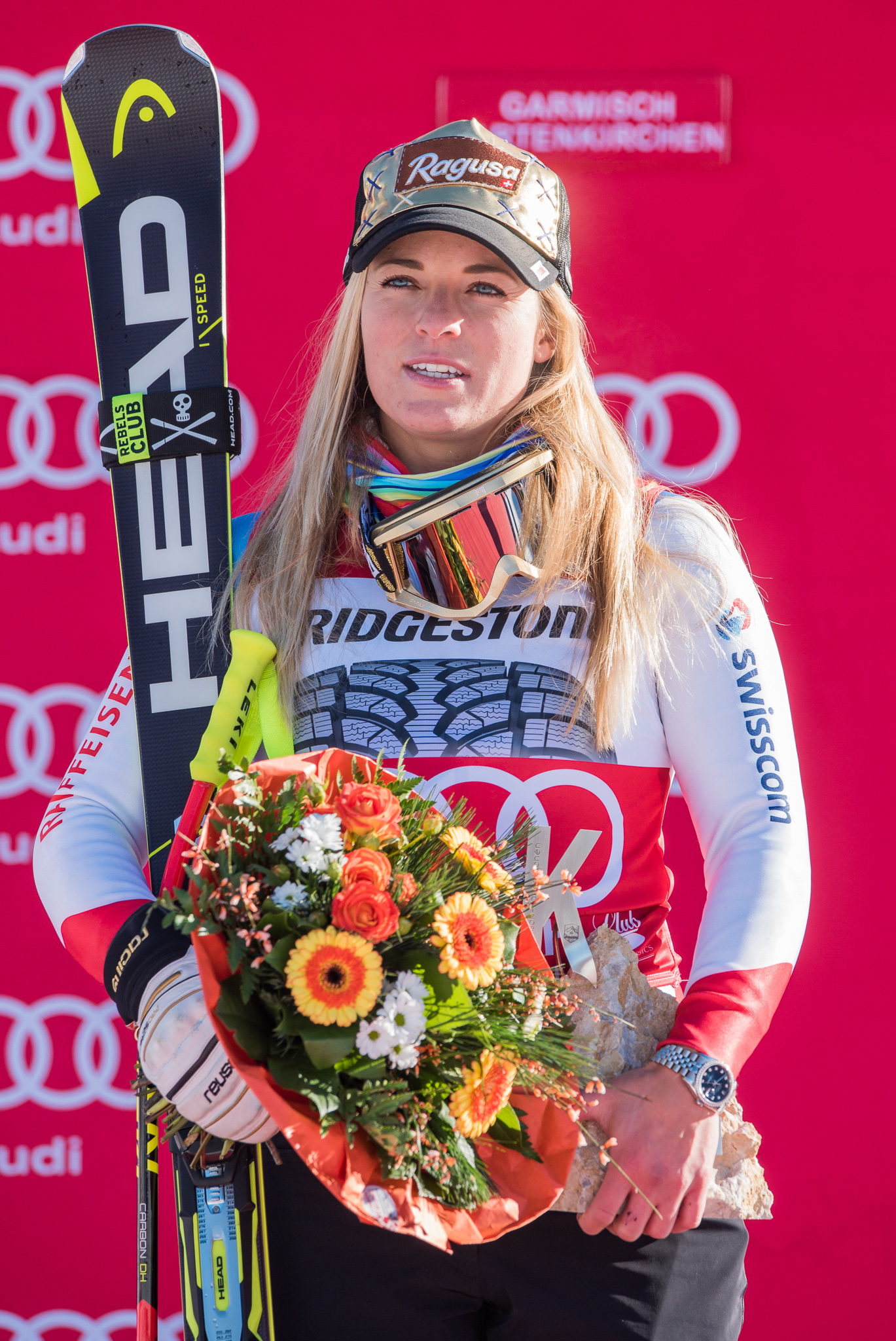
2021 Women's Super-G World Cup: Lara Gut-Behrami of Switzerland, season champion; 2021 Women's World Cup; Overall • downhill • super-G; giant slalom • slalom • parallel
Previous: 2020	Next: 2022

The women's super-G in the 2021 FIS Alpine Skiing World Cup consisted of 6 events, with one cancellation from the scheduled seven. Swiss skier Lara Gut-Behrami won four of the first five Super-Gs to establish an 195-point lead over Swiss teammate and defending discipline champion Corinne Suter with only two races to go, and she clinched the discipline title for 2021 after the sixth event, which turned out to be the last one for the season.

The season was interrupted by the 2021 World Ski Championships, which were held from 8–21 February in Cortina d'Ampezzo, Italy. The women's super-G was scheduled for 9 February 2021 but was cancelled due to fog and finally took place on 11 February 2021.

The final was scheduled for Thursday, 18 March in Lenzerheide, Switzerland. Only the top 25 of the specific ranking and the winner of the Junior World Championship were eligible, although athletes who had scored at least 500 points in the overall classification can participate in all specialties. Due to injuries, only 22 of the top 25 were scheduled to compete, joined by one 500-point skier (Wendy Holdener) and the 2021 junior champion in Super-G (Lena Wechner of Austria). However, a continuation of the bad weather that forced the cancellation of the downhill final led to cancellation of the super-G final as well.

== Standings ==
#	Skier	20 Dec 2020; Val d'Isère (France)	10 Jan 2021; St. Anton (Austria)	24 Jan 2021; Crans Montana (Switzerland)	30 Jan 2021; Garmisch-Partenkirchen (Germany)	1 Feb 2021; Garmisch-Partenkirchen (Germany)	28 Feb 2021; Val di Fassa (Italy)	18 Mar 2021; Lenzerheide (Switzerland)	Total
	(Switzerland) Lara Gut-Behrami	45	100	100	100	100	80	x	525
2	(Italy) Federica Brignone	60	45	60	22	36	100	x	323
3	(Switzerland) Corinne Suter	80	60	29	36	45	60	x	310
4	(Austria) Tamara Tippler	18	50	80	32	60	32	x	272
5	(Czech Republic) Ester Ledecká	100	40	16	40	40	DNS	x	236
6	(Italy) Marta Bassino	50	80	32	DNF	26	40	x	228
7	(Norway) Kajsa Vickhoff Lie	26	DNF	26	80	50	DNF	DNS	182
8	(Slovakia) Petra Vlhová	40	12	DNF	26	80	0	x	158
9	(Italy) Francesca Marsaglia	15	DNF	50	7	29	45	x	146
10	(Italy) Elena Curtoni	32	18	DNF	20	16	50	x	136
11	(Canada) Marie-Michèle Gagnon	12	DNF	20	60	22	11	x	125
12	(Austria) Christine Scheyer	DNS		45	45	DNS	22	x	112
13	(Switzerland) Michelle Gisin	29	32	2	DNS	24	20	x	107
14	(Switzerland) Priska Nufer	15	DNF	40	32	6	9	x	102
15	(Austria) Ricarda Haaser	5	24	36	14	18	DNS		97
16	(Norway) Ragnhild Mowinckel	20	24	11	1	0	36	x	92
17	(France) Tessa Worley	9	DNF	DNS	18	32	29	x	88
18	(Italy) Sofia Goggia	36	DNF	DNF	50	DNS			86
19	(France) Tiffany Gauthier	22	DNF	10	26	6	14	x	78
20	(Austria) Ariane Rädler	7	36	7	DNF	12	0	x	62
21	(Switzerland) Joana Hählen	2	2	24	12	15	5	x	60
22	(Austria) Stephanie Venier	6	29	DNF	0	3	15	x	53
23	(Germany) Kira Weidle	8	16	5	8	7	7	x	51
	(Switzerland) Jasmina Suter	13	DNF	8	13	14	3	x	51
25	(Austria) Mirjam Puchner	0	10	12	16	9	2	x	49
	References								

- Winner
- 2nd place
- 3rd place
- DNF = Did Not Finish
- DNS = Did Not Start
- Updated at 18 March 2021, after all events.

== See also ==
- 2021 Alpine Skiing World Cup – Women's summary rankings
- 2021 Alpine Skiing World Cup – Women's overall
- 2021 Alpine Skiing World Cup – Women's downhill
- 2021 Alpine Skiing World Cup – Women's giant slalom
- 2021 Alpine Skiing World Cup – Women's slalom
- 2021 Alpine Skiing World Cup – Women's parallel
- World Cup scoring system
