= Alexandra Tilley =

Scottish alpine skier

Alex Tilley
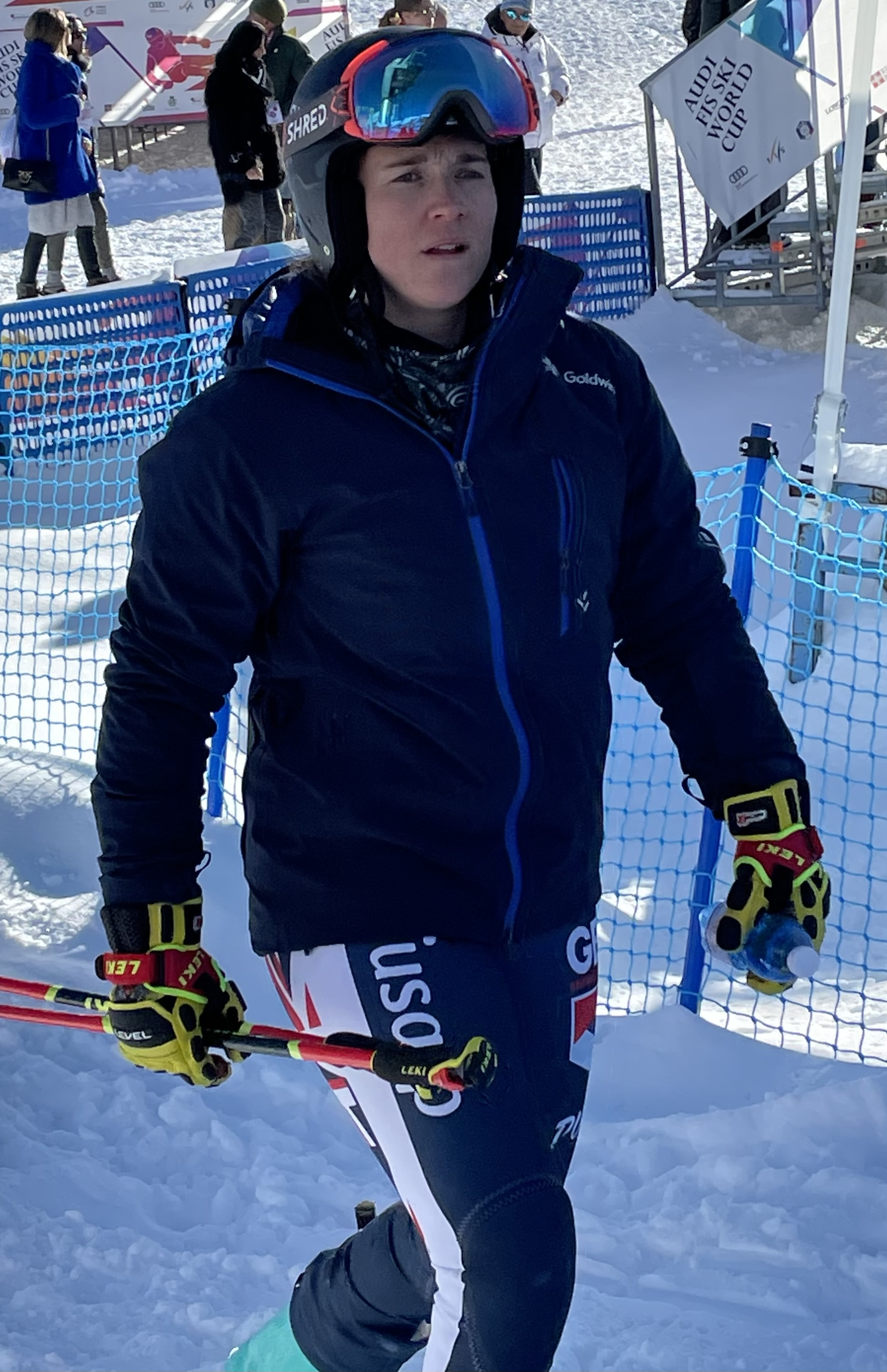

Personal information
- Born: 5 October 1993 (age 32) Torphins, Aberdeenshire, Scotland

Skiing career
- Sport: Alpine skiing ♀
- Club: Gordon Skiers
- Retired: 18 February 2023 (age 29)
- Disciplines: Slalom, giant slalom
- World Cup debut: 27 January 2013 (age 19)

Olympics
- Teams: 1 – (2018)

World Championships
- Teams: 4 – (2015–2021)

World Cup
- Seasons: 9 – (2013–2021)
- Overall titles: 0 – (79th in 2018, 2020)
- Discipline titles: 0 – (28th in GS, 2018)

Alexandra "Alex" Tilley (born 5 October 1993) is a Scottish retired alpine ski racer. She is from Torphins, Aberdeenshire, Scotland, and specialized in the technical disciplines of giant slalom and slalom.

She competed at the 2015 World Championships in Beaver Creek, US, in the giant slalom. She scored her first points in the Alpine Skiing World Cup when she finished 19th in a giant slalom in Lienz in December 2015. At the 2017 World Championships in St. Moritz, Switzerland, she finished 30th in the giant slalom and 25th in the slalom.

She competed in the 2018 and 2022 Winter Olympics in the slalom and giant slalom skiing events. She broke her ankle while training in November 2021.

== World Cup results ==
Season	Age	Overall	Slalom	Giant slalom	Parallel
2016	22	103	—	44	—N/a
2017	23	87	41	42	—N/a
2018	24	79	58	28	—N/a
2019	25	96	—	36	—N/a
2020	26	79	47	29	—
2021	27	95	—	54	17
2022	28	106	—	41	—

=== Results per discipline ===
Discipline	Starts	Top 30	Top 15	Top 5	Podiums	Best result		
Discipline	Starts	Top 30	Top 15	Top 5	Podiums	Date	Location	Place
Slalom	40	3	0	0	0	11 March 2017	Squaw Valley, United States	20th
Giant slalom	45	17	1	0	0	19 December 2017	Courchevel, France	13th
Super-G	0	0	0	0	0			
Downhill	0	0	0	0	0			
Combined	0	0	0	0	0			
Parallel event	2	2	0	0	0	26 November 2020	Lech-Zürs, Austria	17th
Total	87	23	1	0	0			

Standings through 29 January 2021

== World Championship results ==
Year
Year	Age	Slalom	Giant; Slalom	Super G	Downhill	Combined	Parallel	Team event
2015	21	24	35	—	—	—	—N/a	9
2017	23	25	30	—	—	—	—N/a	—
2019	25	—	DNF2	—	—	—	—N/a	9
2021	27	DNF1	17	DNF	—	—	15	12

== Olympic results ==
Year
Year	Age	Slalom	Giant; Slalom	Super G	Downhill	Combined	Team event
2018	24	DNF1	DNF1	—	—	—	5
2022	28	DNF1	22	—	—	—	—

== Other results ==
=== European Cup results ===
==== Season standings ====
Season	Age	Overall	Slalom	Giant slalom	Super-G	Downhill	Combined
2014	20	171	—	71	—	—	—
2015	21	112	—	43	—	—	—
2016	22	102	69	39	—	—	—
2017	23	104	45	—	—	—	—
2018	24	94	—	34	—	—	—
2019	25	119	—	47	—	—	—

==== Results per discipline ====
Discipline	EC starts	EC Top 30	EC Top 15	EC Top 5	EC Podium	Best result		
Discipline	EC starts	EC Top 30	EC Top 15	EC Top 5	EC Podium	Date	Location	Place
Slalom	15	2	1	0	0	16 December 2016	Andalo, Italy	6th
Giant slalom	22	7	6	0	0	22 January 2015; 7 December 2015; 3 December 2017	Zell am See, Austria; Trysil, Norway; Hafjell, Norway	6th
Super-G	3	0	0	0	0	13 January 2014	Innerkrems, Austria	105th
Downhill	0	0	0	0	0			
Combined	2	0	0	0	0	24 January 2014	Spital am Pyhrn, Austria	65th
Total	42	9	7	0	0			

- Standings through 29 January 2021
