= Tess Arbez =

Irish alpine skier (born 1997)

Personal information
- Born: 1 December 1997 (age 28) Saint-Julien-en-Genevois, France
- Height: 1.64 m (5 ft 5 in)

Skiing career
- Sport: Alpine skiing

Tess Arbez (born 1 December 1997) is an Irish alpine ski racer.

== Biography ==
She competed at the 2015 World Championships in Beaver Creek, United States, in the giant slalom and in the slalom. Tess Arbez also competed in four other FIS Alpine World Ski Championships: in St Moritz, Switzerland, in 2017; in Åre, Sweden, in 2019, in Cortina, Italy, in 2021 and Courchevel-Meribel in 2023. In 2018, she was the only female athlete competing for Team Ireland at the PyeongChang Winter Olympic Games. During the 2022 Winter Olympics in Beijing, she became the first Irishwoman to compete in a speed race at the Olympics ranking 42nd in the Super-G. She finished 48th in the slalom.
