= 2021 Alpine Skiing World Cup – Women's downhill =

Alpine ski discipline year standings

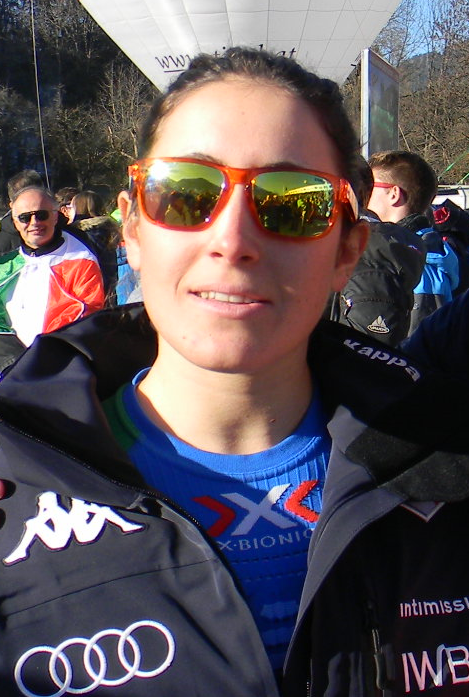
2021 Women's downhill World Cup: Sofia Goggia of Italy, season champion; 2021 Women's World Cup; Overall • downhill • super-G; giant slalom • slalom • parallel
Previous: 2020	Next: 2022

The women's downhill in the 2021 FIS Alpine Skiing World Cup consisted of seven events. The original schedule had called for eight downhills, but (as discussed below) the World Cup finals race was canceled.

2018 discipline champion Sofia Goggia of Italy, who had struggled with injuries since then, held the lead through midseason, and after the second downhill at Crans Montana, she had opened up a 195-point lead over Breezy Johnson of the United States, with everyone else over 200 points behind. However, she then broke a bone in her knee on 31 January and missed the next two events, providing two Swiss skiers (defending discipline champion Corinne Suter of Switzerland and 2016 overall champion Lara Gut-Behrami) with the opportunity to pass her at the season final with a great finish.

The season was interrupted by the 2021 World Ski Championships, which were held from 8–21 February in Cortina d'Ampezzo, Italy. The women's downhill took place on 13 February 2021.

The final was scheduled for Wednesday, 17 March in Lenzerheide, Switzerland. Tentatively, Goggia had planned to try to return for the finals, although her broken bone was still mending. However, three straight days of heavy snowfall, which prevented even a training run from being held, caused the downhill finals to be cancelled, and so Goggia won her second downhill crystal globe without needing to return (her first was in 2018).

== Standings ==
Rank	Name	8 Dec 2020; Val d'Isère (France)	19 Dec 2020; Val d'Isère (France)	9 Jan 2021; St. Anton (Austria)	22 Jan 2021; Crans Montana (Switzerland)	23 Jan 2021; Crans Montana (Switzerland)	26 Feb 2021; Val di Fassa (Italy)	27 Feb 2021; Val di Fassa (Italy)	17 Mar 2021; Lenzerheide (Switzerland)	Total
	(Italy) Sofia Goggia	80	100	100	100	100	DNS		x	480
2	(Switzerland) Corinne Suter	100	80	40	17	32	60	80	x	410
3	(Switzerland) Lara Gut-Behrami	32	24	32	15	80	100	100	x	383
4	(United States) Breezy Johnson	60	60	60	60	45	45	DNF	x	330
5	(Germany) Kira Weidle	24	45	26	45	15	50	60	x	265
6	(Italy) Laura Pirovano	18	14	45	16	50	32	45	x	220
7	(Austria) Tamara Tippler	36	11	80	24	14	22	24	x	211
8	(Italy) Elena Curtoni	26	16	32	22	60	24	26	x	206
	(Czech Republic) Ester Ledecká	40	36	50	80	DNF	DNS		x	206
10	(Austria) Ramona Siebenhofer	6	40	14	4	0	80	50	x	194
11	(Norway) Kajsa Vickhoff Lie	16	50	15	13	DNF	45	40	x	179
12	(Slovakia) Petra Vlhová	5	0	22	50	36	29	22	x	164
13	(Switzerland) Jasmine Flury	11	12	18	46	18	18	32	x	147
14	(Slovenia) Ilka Štuhec	50	36	40	0	4	5	11	x	145
15	(Switzerland) Michelle Gisin	12	29	11	0	26	29	36	x	143
16	(Canada) Marie-Michèle Gagnon	13	26	DNF	DNF	24	36	29	x	128
17	(Switzerland) Priska Nufer	20	20	7	36	18	11	13	x	125
18	(Austria) Mirjam Puchner	9	22	1	32	13	20	16	x	113
19	(Italy) Federica Brignone	DNF	DNS	16	29	29	14	8	x	96
20	(Italy) Nadia Delago	4	2	8	26	20	15	20	x	95
21	(Austria) Stephanie Venier	22	3	24	DNF	0	16	15	x	80
22	(Switzerland) Jasmina Suter	0	10	3	7	40	2	9	x	71
23	(Austria) Nina Ortlieb	45	18	DNF	DNS				x	63
24	(Norway) Ragnhild Mowinckel	29	6	0	0	5	6	12	x	58
25	(Italy) Francesca Marsaglia	10	7	12	DNF	12	10	6	x	57
	References									

- Winner
- 2nd place
- 3rd place
- DNF = Did Not Finish
- DNS = Did Not Start
- Updated at 17 March 2021, after all events.

== See also ==
- 2021 Alpine Skiing World Cup – Women's summary rankings
- 2021 Alpine Skiing World Cup – Women's overall
- 2021 Alpine Skiing World Cup – Women's super-G
- 2021 Alpine Skiing World Cup – Women's giant slalom
- 2021 Alpine Skiing World Cup – Women's slalom
- 2021 Alpine Skiing World Cup – Women's parallel
- World Cup scoring system
