= 2021 Alpine Skiing World Cup – Women's giant slalom =

Alpine ski discipline year standings

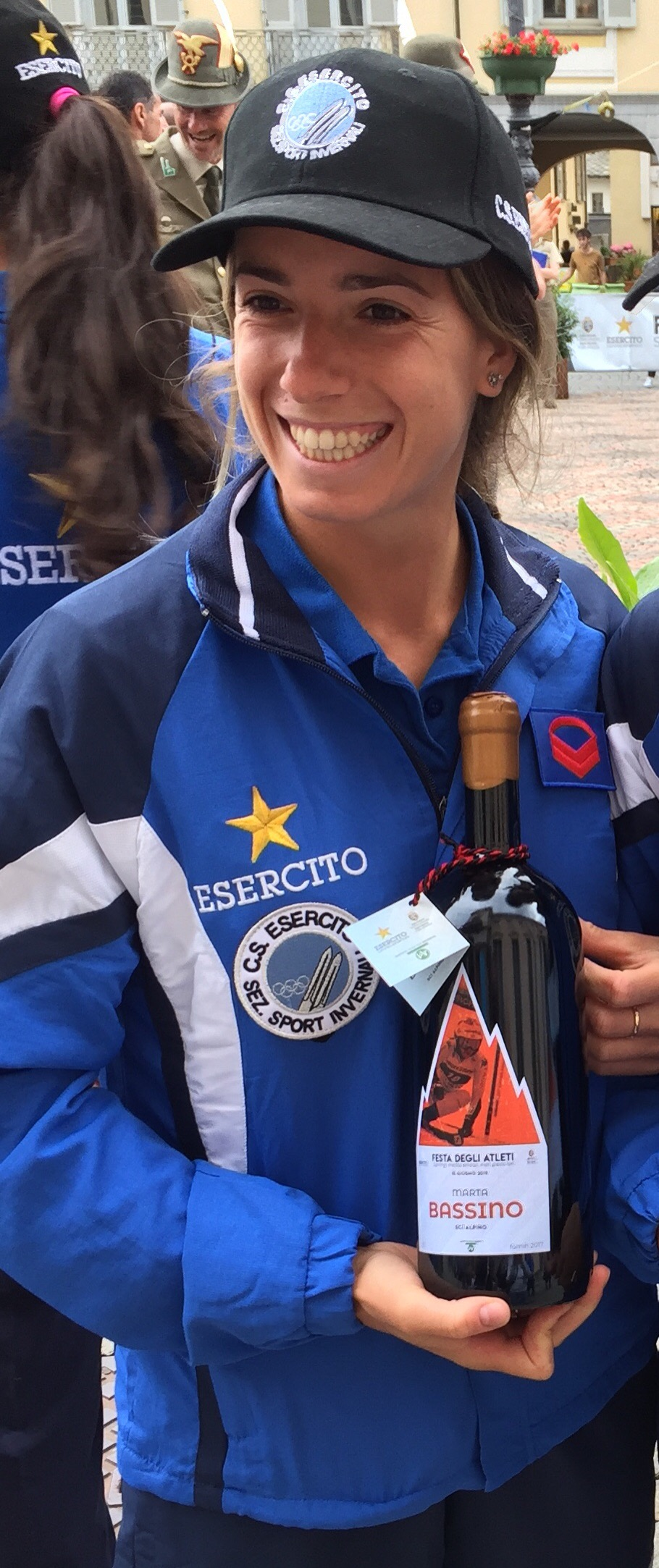
2021 Women's giant slalom World Cup: Marta Bassino of Italy, season champion; 2021 Women's World Cup; Overall • downhill • super-G; giant slalom • slalom • parallel
Previous: 2020	Next: 2022

The women's giant slalom in the 2021 FIS Alpine Skiing World Cup consisted of 8 events including the final in Lenzerheide, Switzerland. The original schedule had included nine events, but a race in Semmering had to be cancelled after the first run had already been completed when hurricane-force winds moved in and caused significant damage, including to the timing equipment.

Italian skier Marta Bassino won four of the first five events in the discipline to establish a lead of over 100 points, which remained consistent from there; she clinched the crystal globe for the season after the next-to-last event in Jasná, Slovakia, where she finished fourth.

The season was interrupted by the 2021 World Ski Championships, which were held from 8–21 February in Cortina d'Ampezzo, Italy. The women's giant slalom took place on 18 February 2021.

The final took place on Sunday, 21 March in Lenzerheide, Switzerland. Only the top 25 of the specific ranking and the winner of the Junior World Championship, plus athletes who have scored at least 500 points in the overall classification, were eligible.

== Standings ==
#	Skier	17 Oct 2020; Sölden (Austria)	12 Dec 2020; Courchevel (France)	14 Dec 2020; Courchevel (France)	28 Dec 2020; Semmering (Austria)	16 Jan 2021; Kranjska Gora (Slovenia)	17 Jan 2021; Kranjska Gora (Slovenia)	26 Jan 2021; Kronplatz (Italy)	07 Mar 2021; Jasná (Slovakia)	20 Mar 2021; Lenzerheide (Switzerland)	Total
	(Italy) Marta Bassino	100	100	DNF2	x	100	100	60	50	36	546
2	(United States) Mikaela Shiffrin	DNS	50	100	x	40	40	50	60	80	420
3	(France) Tessa Worley	29	22	60	x	80	45	100	26	29	391
4	(Switzerland) Michelle Gisin	50	32	50	x	60	80	40	32	45	389
5	(Italy) Federica Brignone	80	45	80	x	45	DNF2	32	40	50	372
6	(Slovakia) Petra Vlhová	60	60	DNF1	x	50	26	22	100	24	342
7	(Switzerland) Lara Gut-Behrami	32	29	36	x	32	50	80	29	DNF1	288
8	(New Zealand) Alice Robinson	22	DNF2	DNF1	x	18	29	29	80	100	278
9	(Slovenia) Meta Hrovat	40	DNF2	DNS	x	29	60	45	DNS	60	234
10	(Austria) Katharina Liensberger	DNF2	40	45	x	5	18	14	36	40	198
11	(Sweden) Sara Hector	18	80	26	x	3	DNQ	26	11	32	196
12	(Austria) Ramona Siebenhofer	12	7	20	x	36	22	15	45	16	173
13	(Italy) Sofia Goggia	40	13	29	x	16	36	36	DNS		170
14	(Poland) Maryna Gasienica-Daniel	DNQ	10	24	x	26	24	24	DNF2	26	134
15	(Austria) Stephanie Brunner	14	36	40	x	DNF1	DNF1	16	13	DNS	119
16	(Norway) Mina Fürst Holtmann	45	DNF1	DNF1	x	22	13	20	DNS		100
17	(United States) Nina O'Brien	16	12	DNQ	x	20	20	6	DNF2	22	96
18	(Italy) Elena Curtoni	DNS	14	18	x	15	7	9	7	20	90
19	(Norway) Ragnhild Mowinckel	DNS	11	5	x	13	14	13	24	-	80
20	(Austria) Katharina Truppe	16	24	22	x	4	DNQ	12	DNS		78
21	(Slovenia) Ana Bucik	10	15	9	x	DNQ	3	18	22	DNF1	77
22	(Switzerland) Wendy Holdener	5	DNF2	10	x	DNF1	32	DNF1	15	DNS	62
23	(Austria) Ricarda Haaser	DNF1	26	32	x	DNQ	DNF1	DNQ	DNS		58
24	(Canada) Valérie Grenier	6	20	DNQ	x	15	16	DNF1	DNF2	DNF2	57
25	(Netherlands) Adriana Jelinkova	DNQ	8	14	x	24	DNF1	DNS			46
	References										

- Winner
- 2nd place
- 3rd place
- DNS = Did not start
- DNF1 = Did Not Finish run 1
- DNQ = Did not qualify for run 2
- DNF = Did Not Finish run 2
- Updated at 21 March 2021, after all events.

== See also ==
- 2021 Alpine Skiing World Cup – Women's summary rankings
- 2021 Alpine Skiing World Cup – Women's overall
- 2021 Alpine Skiing World Cup – Women's downhill
- 2021 Alpine Skiing World Cup – Women's super-G
- 2021 Alpine Skiing World Cup – Women's slalom
- 2021 Alpine Skiing World Cup – Women's parallel
- World Cup scoring system
