= Tina Robnik =

Slovene alpine skier (born 1991)

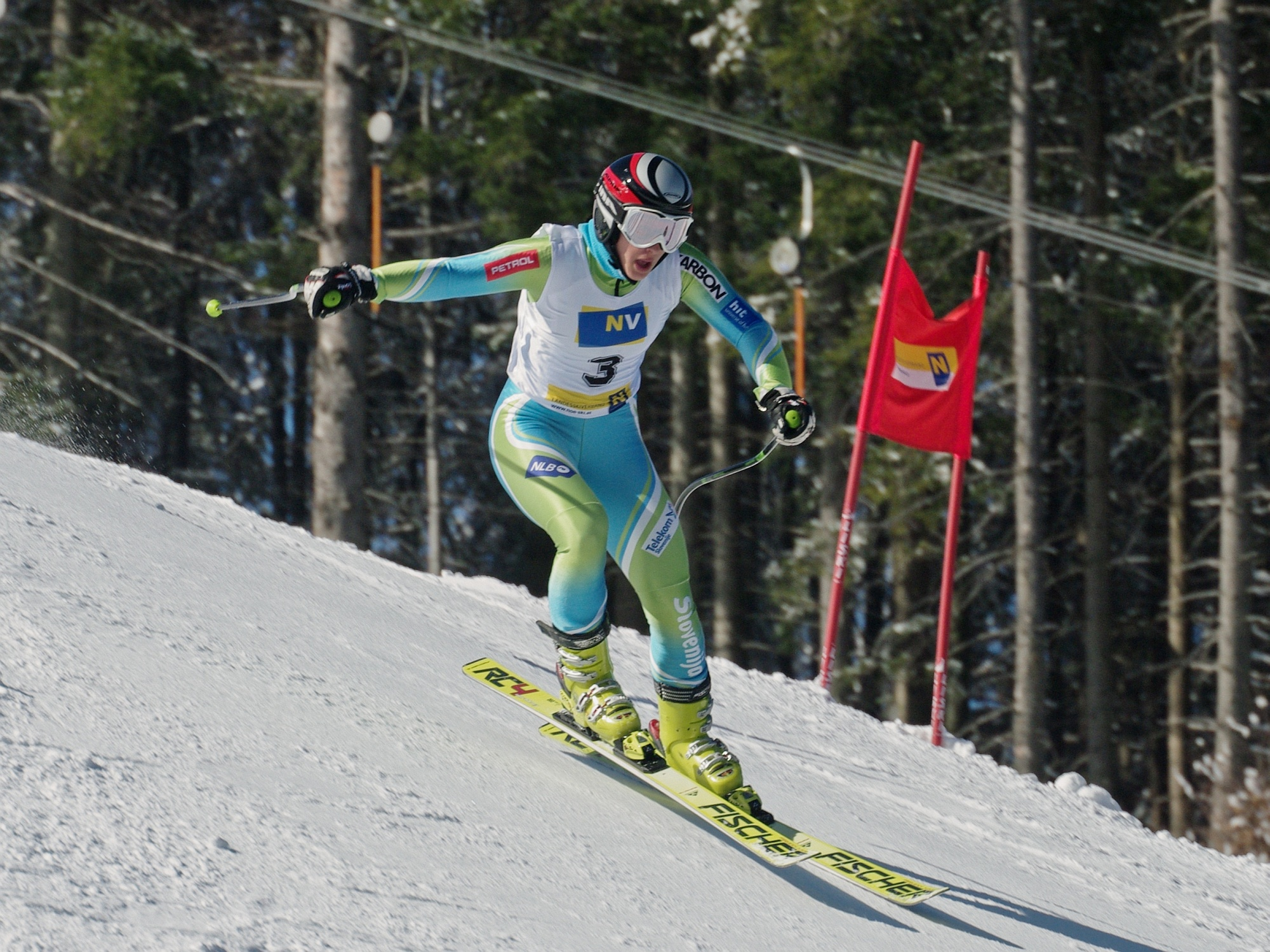
Robnik in 2010.

Tina Robnik (born 30 July 1991 in Celje) is a Slovenian alpine ski racer.

== World Cup results ==
=== Season standings ===
| Season | Age | Overall | Slalom | Giant Slalom | Super G | Downhill | Combined |
|---|---|---|---|---|---|---|---|
| 2016 | 25 | 96 | — | 38 | — | — | — |
| 2017 | 26 | 79 | — | 29 | — | — | — |
| 2018 | 27 | 55 | — | 15 | — | — | — |
| 2019 | 28 | unranked | 0 points | | | | |
| 2020 | 29 | 45 | — | 15 | — | — | — |
| 2021 | 30 | 65 | — | 28 | — | — | — |
| 2022 | 31 | 65 | — | 31 | — | — | — |
| 2023 | 32 | 121 | — | 49 | — | — | — |

- Standings through 19 March 2023

== World Championships results ==
| Year | Age | Giant slalom |
|---|---|---|
| 2013 | 22 | DSQ1 |
| 2017 | 26 | DNF2 |
| 2021 | 30 | 15 |
