= Meta Hrovat =

Slovenian alpine skier

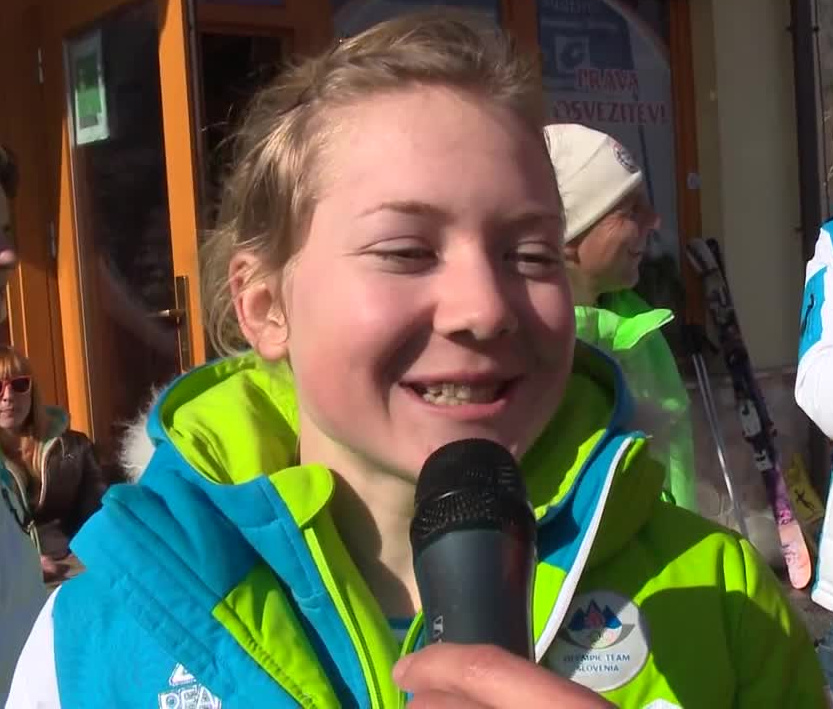
- February 2016

Personal information
- Born: 2 March 1998 (age 28) Ljubljana, Slovenia

Skiing career
- Sport: Alpine skiing
- Club: KRG-ASK Kranjska Gora
- Disciplines: Giant slalom, slalom
- World Cup debut: 28 December 2015 (age 17)

Olympics
- Teams: 1 – (2018)
- Medals: 0

World Championships
- Teams: 1 - (2021)

World Cup
- Seasons: 6 – (2016–2022)
- Wins: 0
- Podiums: 4 – (4 GS)
- Overall titles: 0 – (36th in 2019)
- Discipline titles: 0 – (11th in GS, 2018)
Medal record
Women's alpine skiing
Representing Slovenia
World Junior Ski Championships
Gold medal – first place	2019 Val di Fassa	Slalom
Gold medal – first place	2018 Davos	Slalom
Gold medal – first place	2016 Sochi	Team
Silver medal – second place	2018 Davos	Combined
Silver medal – second place	2017 Åre	Combined
Youth Olympic Games
Bronze medal – third place	2016 Lillehammer	Slalom
- Updated on 17 January 2021

Meta Hrovat (born 2 March 1998) is a Slovenian World Cup alpine ski racer. On 24 October 2022, she announced her retirement from alpine skiing. On 31 May 2023, she announced her comeback, switching to Head skis

== World Cup results ==
=== Season standings ===
Season	Age	Overall	Slalom	Giant Slalom	Super G	Downhill	Combined
2017	18	102	57	39	—	—	—
2018	19	50	55	11	—	—	—
2019	20	36	22	14	—	—	—
2020	21	25	23	9	—	—	—
2021	22	25	48	9	—	—	—
2022	23	55	41	20	—	—	—

=== Race podiums ===
- 4 podiums – (4 GS)

Season	Date	Location	Discipline	Position
2018	27 January 2018	Lenzerheide, Switzerland	Giant slalom	3rd
2020	15 February 2020	Kranjska Gora, Slovenia	Giant slalom	3rd
2021	17 January 2021	Kranjska Gora, Slovenia	Giant slalom	3rd
2021	21 March 2021	Lenzerheide, Switzerland	Giant slalom	3rd

== World Championship results ==
Year	Age	Slalom	Giant slalom	Super-G	Downhill	Combined
2021	22	DNF1	DNF2	28	–	DNF2

== Olympic results ==
Year
Year	Age	Slalom	Giant slalom	Super-G	Downhill	Combined
2018	19	21	14	—	—	—
2022	23	—	7	—	—	—
