= 2021 Alpine Skiing World Cup – Women's slalom =

Alpine ski discipline year standings

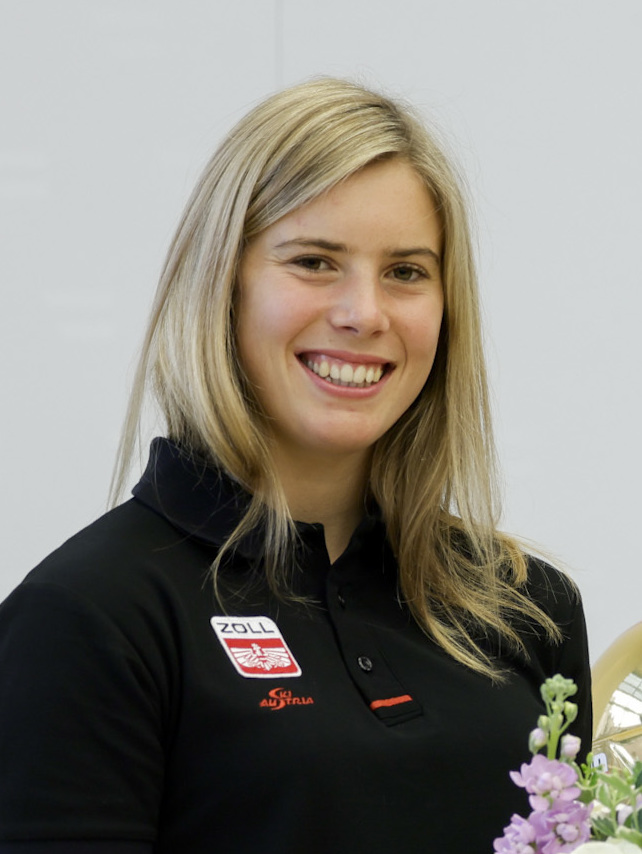
2021 Women's slalom World Cup: Katharina Liensberger of Austria, season champion; 2021 Women's World Cup; Overall • downhill • Super-G; Giant slalom • Slalom • Parallel
Previous: 2020	Next: 2022

The women's slalom in the 2021 FIS Alpine Skiing World Cup consisted of 9 events, as planned.

The battle for the season championship turned into a three-way contest between defending discipline champion Petra Vlhová from Slovakia, six-time discipline champion Mikaela Shiffrin from the US, and Austrian newcomer Katharina Liensberger, who (at 23) was only two years younger than her established rivals. Going into the finals in Lenzerheide, Switzerland, after wins by Vlhová and Liensberger in back-to-back slaloms in Åre, Sweden, Vhlová had a 22-point lead on Liensberger and a 37-point lead on Shiffrin, with everyone else at least 180 points behind. However, in the season final, Liensberger posted the fastest time in both heats to defeat Shiffrin, who finished second, and win both the race and the season championship for the discipline. Liensberger thus became the first Austrian woman to win this discipline since Marlies Schild in 2011.

The season was interrupted by the 2021 World Ski Championships, which were held from 8–21 February in Cortina d'Ampezzo, Italy. The women's slalom was held on 20 February 2021 (and was also won by Liensberger).

== Standings ==
#	Skier	21 Nov 2020; Levi (Finland)	22 Nov 2020; Levi (Finland)	29 Dec 2020; Semmering (Austria)	03 Jan 2021; Zagreb (Croatia)	12 Jan 2021; Flachau (Austria)	06 Mar 2021; Jasná (Slovakia)	12 Mar 2021; Åre (Sweden)	13 Mar 2021; Åre (Sweden)	20 Mar 2021; Lenzerheide (Switzerland)	Total
	(Austria) Katharina Liensberger	60	60	80	80	80	50	80	100	100	690
2	(United States) Mikaela Shiffrin	80	45	60	50	100	100	60	80	80	655
3	(Slovakia) Petra Vlhová	100	100	50	100	50	80	100	32	40	652
4	(Switzerland) Michelle Gisin	45	80	100	60	45	45	36	20	60	491
5	(Switzerland) Wendy Holdener	50	50	45	40	60	60	50	60	DNS	415
6	(Germany) Lena Dürr	14	10	20	32	24	22	45	50	18	235
7	(Norway) Kristin Lysdahl	10	14	36	36	15	DNQ	26	40	50	227
8	(Canada) Laurence St. Germain	40	32	10	12	36	26	24	24	24	224
9	(Austria) Chiara Mair	32	24	22	29	36	12	13	5	20	193
10	(Czech Republic) Martina Dubovská	22	26	9	14	14	32	20	22	29	188
11	(United States) Paula Moltzan	DNQ	8	DNQ	18	29	20	29	45	36	185
12	(Austria) Katharina Truppe	36	36	40	DNF1	26	DNS2	DNS			138
13	(Sweden) Sara Hector	DNS		20	DNF2	18	24	DNF2	18	45	125
	(Slovenia) Ana Bucik	15	15	DNQ	DNF1	13	40	36	6	0	125
15	(Austria) Franziska Gritsch	DNF1	40	DNF2	DNF2	DNQ	10	40	26	DNF1	116
16	(Canada) Erin Mielzynski	16	20	13	45	DNF1	7	DNF1	7	DNF1	108
	(Austria) Katharina Gallhuber	DNF1	9	5	24	DNQ	5	14	29	22	108
18	(Norway) Kristina Riis-Johannessen	9	13	14	20	DNQ	DNQ	15	36	0	107
19	(Slovenia) Andreja Slokar	DNS		DNF2	DNQ	8	29	16	12	32	97
20	(Italy) Irene Curtoni	24	32	7	15	DNF2	15	DNF2	DNF2	DSQ2	93
	(Switzerland) Camille Rast	DNF1	DNQ	DNQ	DNQ	40	14	10	13	16	93
22	(Austria) Katharina Huber	26	18	26	DNF2	22	DNF2	DNF1	DNQ	DNF2	92
23	(France) Nastasia Noens	5	DNQ	DNQ	22	6	11	11	8	26	89
24	(Norway) Mina Fürst Holtmann	18	22	DNQ	26	7	DNQ	DNS			73
25	(Switzerland) Melanie Meillard	29	DNF1	11	DNF1	20	DNF2	DNQ	DNS		60
	References										

- Winner
- 2nd place
- 3rd place
- DNS = Did not start
- DNF1 = Did Not Finish run 1
- DNQ = Did not qualify for run 2
- DNS2 = Did not start run 2
- DNF2 = Did Not Finish run 2
- DSQ1 = Disqualified run 1
- DSQ2 = Disqualified run 2
- Updated at 20 March 2021, after all events.

== See also ==
- 2021 Alpine Skiing World Cup – Women's summary rankings
- 2021 Alpine Skiing World Cup – Women's overall
- 2021 Alpine Skiing World Cup – Women's downhill
- 2021 Alpine Skiing World Cup – Women's super-G
- 2021 Alpine Skiing World Cup – Women's giant slalom
- 2021 Alpine Skiing World Cup – Women's parallel
- World Cup scoring system
