= FIS Alpine World Ski Championships 2021 – Women's super-G =

Women's super-G competition

Women's super-G at the FIS Alpine World Ski Championships 2021
- Location: Cortina d'Ampezzo, Italy
- Date: 11 February
- Competitors: 42 from 21 nations
- Winning time: 1:25.51

Medalists
gold medal	Lara Gut-Behrami	Switzerland
silver medal	Corinne Suter	Switzerland
bronze medal	Mikaela Shiffrin	United States

Women's Super-G
- Location: Olimpia delle Tofane; Cortina d'Ampezzo, Italy
- Vertical: 600 m (1,969 ft)
- Top elevation: 2,160 m (7,087 ft)
- Base elevation: 1,560 m (5,118 ft)
- Longest run: 2.150 km (1.336 mi)

The Women's super-G competition at the FIS Alpine World Ski Championships 2021 was scheduled to be held on 9 February but was postponed to 11 February 2021 due to fog.

== Results ==
The race started at 10:45 CET (UTC+1) under clear skies. The air temperature was −8 °C (18 °F) at the starting gate and −7 °C (19 °F) at the finish.

Rank	Bib	Name	Country	Time	Diff
1st place, gold medalist(s)	7	Lara Gut-Behrami	Switzerland	1:25.51	—
2nd place, silver medalist(s)	5	Corinne Suter	Switzerland	1:25.85	+0.34
3rd place, bronze medalist(s)	4	Mikaela Shiffrin	United States	1:25.98	+0.47
4	11	Ester Ledecká	Czech Republic	1:26.04	+0.53
5	13	Kajsa Vickhoff Lie	Norway	1:26.16	+0.65
6	12	Marie-Michèle Gagnon	Canada	1:26.29	+0.78
7	3	Tamara Tippler	Austria	1:26.38	+0.87
8	14	Michelle Gisin	Switzerland	1:26.40	+0.89
9	15	Petra Vlhová	Slovakia	1:26.41	+0.90
10	9	Federica Brignone	Italy	1:26.60	+1.09
11	1	Marta Bassino	Italy	1:26.70	+1.19
12	8	Ragnhild Mowinckel	Norway	1:26.74	+1.23
13	16	Tessa Worley	France	1:26.81	+1.30
13	10	Priska Nufer	Switzerland	1:26.81	+1.30
15	24	Breezy Johnson	United States	1:27.02	+1.51
16	6	Ariane Rädler	Austria	1:27.10	+1.59
17	18	Christine Scheyer	Austria	1:27.16	+1.65
18	17	Elena Curtoni	Italy	1:27.30	+1.79
19	29	Kira Weidle	Germany	1:27.44	+1.93
20	20	Stephanie Venier	Austria	1:27.54	+2.03
21	2	Tiffany Gauthier	France	1:27.71	+2.20
22	25	Isabella Wright	United States	1:27.80	+2.29
23	19	Francesca Marsaglia	Italy	1:27.98	+2.47
24	23	Maruša Ferk	Slovenia	1:28.15	+2.64
25	30	Ilka Štuhec	Slovenia	1:28.37	+2.86
26	26	Laura Gauché	France	1:28.38	+2.87
27	31	Maryna Gąsienica-Daniel	Poland	1:28.47	+2.96
28	43	Meta Hrovat	Slovenia	1:28.71	+3.20
29	33	AJ Hurt	United States	1:28.89	+3.38
30	21	Julia Pleshkova	Russian Ski Federation	1:29.10	+3.59
31	27	Estelle Alphand	Sweden	1:29.45	+3.94
32	39	Jacqueline Wiles	United States	1:29.47	+3.96
33	36	Nevena Ignjatović	Serbia	1:30.04	+4.53
34	22	Tifany Roux	France	1:30.16	+4.65
35	34	Lin Ivarsson	Sweden	1:30.22	+4.71
36	40	Francesca Baruzzi	Argentina	1:30.99	+5.48
37	38	Greta Small	Australia	1:31.00	+5.49
38	32	Elvedina Muzaferija	Bosnia and Herzegovina	1:31.54	+6.03
39	42	Anastasiya Shepilenko	Ukraine	1:32.98	+7.47
	28	Valérie Grenier	Canada	Did not finish	
	41	Alexandra Tilley	Great Britain	Did not finish	
	37	Sabrina Simader	Kenya	Disqualified	
	35	Ania Monica Caill	Romania	Did not start	
