= Coralie Frasse Sombet =

French alpine skier (born 1991)

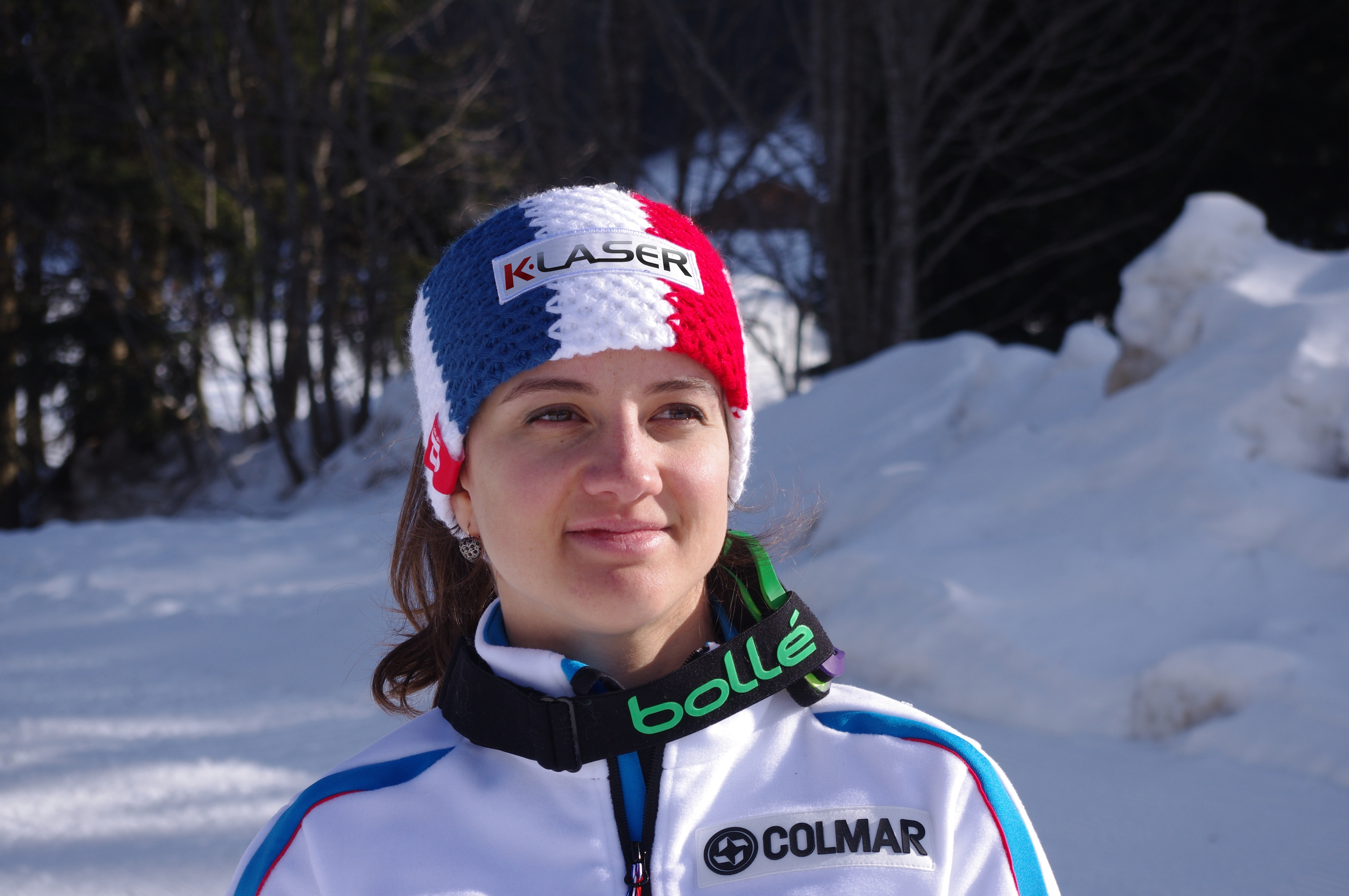
Coralie Frasse Sombet

Coralie Frasse Sombet (born 8 April 1991 in Saint-Martin-d'Hères) is a French alpine ski racer.
