= FIS Alpine World Ski Championships 2021 – Women's downhill =

Women's downhill at the FIS Alpine World Ski Championships 2021
- Location: Cortina d'Ampezzo, Italy
- Date: 13 February
- Competitors: 31 from 16 nations
- Winning time: 1:34.27

Medalists
gold medal	Corinne Suter	Switzerland
silver medal	Kira Weidle	Germany
bronze medal	Lara Gut-Behrami	Switzerland

Women's Downhill
- Location: Olimpia delle Tofane; Cortina d'Ampezzo, Italy
- Vertical: 760 m (2,493 ft)
- Top elevation: 2,320 m (7,612 ft)
- Base elevation: 1,560 m (5,118 ft)
- Longest run: 2.660 km (1.65 mi)

The Women's downhill competition at the FIS Alpine World Ski Championships 2021 was held on 13 February 2021.

Switzerland's Corinne Suter won the gold medal, Kira Weidle of Germany took the silver, and the bronze medalist was Lara Gut-Behrami of Switzerland.

The race course was 2.660 km (1.65 mi) in length, with a vertical drop of 760 m (2,493 ft) from a starting elevation of 2,320 m (7,612 ft) above sea level. Suter's winning time of 94.27 seconds yielded an average speed of 101.580 km/h (63.1 mph) and an average vertical descent rate of 8.062 m/s (26.5 ft/s).

== Results ==
The race started at 11:00 CET (UTC+1) under clear skies. The air temperature was −8 °C (18 °F) at the starting gate and −9 °C (16 °F) at the finish.

Rank	Bib	Name	Country	Time	Diff
1st place, gold medalist(s)	7	Corinne Suter	Switzerland	1:34.27	—
2nd place, silver medalist(s)	11	Kira Weidle	Germany	1:34.47	+0.20
3rd place, bronze medalist(s)	13	Lara Gut-Behrami	Switzerland	1:34.64	+0.37
4	9	Ester Ledecká	Czech Republic	1:34.71	+0.44
5	14	Ramona Siebenhofer	Austria	1:34.77	+0.50
5	8	Michelle Gisin	Switzerland	1:34.77	+0.50
7	15	Tamara Tippler	Austria	1:34.81	+0.54
8	19	Elena Curtoni	Italy	1:35.10	+0.83
9	5	Breezy Johnson	United States	1:35.17	+0.90
10	12	Ragnhild Mowinckel	Norway	1:35.26	+0.99
11	18	Mirjam Puchner	Austria	1:35.29	+1.02
12	3	Laura Pirovano	Italy	1:35.44	+1.17
13	16	Marie-Michèle Gagnon	Canada	1:35.49	+1.22
14	17	Ilka Štuhec	Slovenia	1:35.57	+1.30
15	4	Nadia Delago	Italy	1:35.69	+1.42
16	6	Kajsa Vickhoff Lie	Norway	1:35.70	+1.43
17	1	Francesca Marsaglia	Italy	1:35.81	+1.54
18	2	Jasmina Suter	Switzerland	1:36.00	+1.73
19	10	Christine Scheyer	Austria	1:36.26	+1.99
20	22	Laura Gauché	France	1:36.41	+2.14
21	27	Isabella Wright	United States	1:36.47	+2.20
22	21	Maruša Ferk	Slovenia	1:36.53	+2.26
23	20	Tiffany Gauthier	France	1:36.61	+2.34
24	29	Jacqueline Wiles	United States	1:37.01	+2.74
25	25	Elvedina Muzaferija	Bosnia and Herzegovina	1:37.13	+2.86
26	26	Laurenne Ross	United States	1:37.30	+3.03
27	24	Julia Pleshkova	Russian Ski Federation	1:37.53	+3.26
28	23	Greta Small	Australia	1:37.68	+3.41
29	30	Lin Ivarsson	Sweden	1:37.70	+3.43
30	28	Ania Monica Caill	Romania	1:39.04	+4.77
	31	Nevena Ignjatović	Serbia	DNF	
