= 2022–23 FIS Alpine Ski Nor-Am Cup =

Discipline	Men	Women
Overall	(United States) Isaiah Nelson	(United States) Mary Bocock
Downhill	(United States) Erik Arvidsson	(United States) Tricia Mangan (United States) Lauren Macuga
Super-G	(United States) Samuel Dupratt	(United States) Mary Bocock
Giant slalom	(Canada) Asher Jordan	(Canada) Cassidy Gray
Slalom	(Switzerland) Reto Schmidiger	(United States) Allie Resnick

Competition
Locations	7 venues	8 venues
Individual	24 events	25 events
Cancelled	2 events	1 event

The 2022–23 FIS Alpine Ski Nor-Am Cup is the fifty second consecutive Nor-Am Cup season, the second international level competition in alpine skiing.

== Men ==
=== Calendar ===
Stage	Date	Place	Discipline	Winner	Second	Third	Details
1	7 December 2022	(United States) Copper Mountain	Downhill	(United States) Sam Morse	(United States) Kyle Negomir	(United States) Erik Arvidsson	
2	8 December 2022	(United States) Copper Mountain	Downhill	(United States) Erik Arvidsson	(United States) Sam Morse	(United States) Kyle Negomir	
3	10 December 2022	(United States) Copper Mountain	Super-G	(United States) Kyle Negomir	(United States) Samuel Dupratt	(United States) Sam Morse	
4	10 December 2022	(United States) Copper Mountain	Super-G	(United States) Kyle Negomir	(United States) Samuel Dupratt	(United States) Erik Arvidsson	
5	12 December 2022	(United States) Beaver Creek	Giant slalom	(United States) Jacob Dilling	(United States) Jack Smith	(Norway) Gustav Rosberg Vøllo	
6	13 December 2022	(United States) Beaver Creek	Giant slalom	(United States) Cornelius Cooper	(Czech Republic) Filip Forejtek	(United States) Jimmy Krupka	
7	14 December 2022	(United States) Beaver Creek	Slalom	(United States) Jimmy Krupka	(Czech Republic) Filip Forejtek	(Canada) William St-Germain	
8	15 December 2022	(United States) Beaver Creek	Slalom	(Canada) Justin Alkier	(Czech Republic) Filip Forejtek	(United States) Jimmy Krupka	
9	3 January 2023	(United States) Burke Mountain	Slalom	(United States) Cooper Puckett	(United States) Isaiah Nelson	(Canada) Justin Alkier	
10	4 January 2023	(United States) Burke Mountain	Slalom	(United States) Isaiah Nelson	(Switzerland) Federico Toscano	(United States) Jay Poulter	
11	7 January 2023	(United States) Burke Mountain	Super-G	(United States) Isaiah Nelson	(United States) Jack Smith	(Canada) Raphaël Lessard	
12	7 January 2023	(United States) Burke Mountain	Super-G	(United States) Tristan Lane	(United States) Jack Smith	(Switzerland) Andri Moser	
13	23 February 2023	(Canada) Mont Ste. Marie	Giant slalom	(United States) Isaiah Nelson	(Lithuania) Andrej Drukarov	(Canada) Justin Alkier	
14	24 February 2023	(Canada) Camp Fortune	Slalom	(Switzerland) Reto Schmidiger	(Canada) Liam Wallace	(United States) Isaiah Nelson	
15	27 February 2023	(Canada) Tremblant	Giant slalom	(United States) Brian McLaughlin	(Canada) Liam Wallace	(United States) Isaiah Nelson	
16	1 March 2023	(Canada) Tremblant	Giant slalom	(United States) George Steffey	(Canada) Asher Jordan	(Canada) Liam Wallace	
17	2 March 2023	(Canada) Tremblant	Slalom	(Canada) Asher Jordan	(United States) Benjamin Ritchie	(United States) Jimmy Krupka	
18	2 March 2023	(Canada) Tremblant	Slalom	(Canada) Declan McCormack	(Switzerland) Tanguy Nef	(United Kingdom) Billy Major	
	4 March 2023	(United States) Burke Mountain	Giant slalom	cancelled			
19	5 March 2023	(United States) Burke Mountain	Giant slalom	(Canada) Asher Jordan	(Lithuania) Andrej Drukarov	(Denmark) Christian Borgnæs	
20	22 March 2023	(Canada) Whistler	Downhill	(United States) Erik Arvidsson	(United States) Kyle Negomir	(Canada) Jeffrey Read	
21	23 March 2023	(Canada) Whistler	Downhill	(United States) Jared Goldberg	(Canada) Broderick Thompson	(United States) Erik Arvidsson	
	25 March 2023	(Canada) Whistler	Super-G	cancelled			
22	26 March 2023	(Canada) Whistler	Super-G	(Canada) Jeffrey Read	(United States) Isaiah Nelson	(United States) Erik Arvidsson	
23	27 March 2023	(Canada) Whistler	Giant slalom	(United States) Isaiah Nelson	(Canada) Asher Jordan	(Canada) Liam Wallace	
24	28 March 2023	(Canada) Whistler	Slalom	(United States) Jett Seymour	(Switzerland) Reto Schmidiger	(United States) Benjamin Ritchie	

=== Rankings ===
==== Overall ====
Rank	after 24 of 24 races	Points
1	(United States) Isaiah Nelson	902
2	(United States) Jack Smith	542
3	(Canada) Asher Jordan	535
4	(Canada) Justin Alkier	529
5	(United States) Kyle Negomir	506

==== Downhill ====
Rank	after 4 of 4 races	Points
1	(United States) Erik Arvidsson	340
2	(United States) Kyle Negomir	270
3	(United States) Sam Morse	259
4	(United States) Wiley Maple	140
5	(United States) Jared Goldberg	136

==== Super-G ====
Rank	after 5 of 5 races	Points
1	(United States) Samuel Dupratt	278
2	(United States) Jack Smith	268
3	(United States) Kyle Negomir	236
4	(United States) Isaiah Nelson	230
5	(United States) Tristan Lane	218

==== Giant slalom ====
Rank	after 7 of 7 races	Points
1	(Canada) Asher Jordan	350
2	(United States) Isaiah Nelson	322
3	(Canada) Liam Wallace	295
4	(Lithuania) Andrej Drukarov	234
5	(Canada) Justin Alkier	210

==== Slalom ====
Rank	after 8 of 8 races	Points
1	(Switzerland) Reto Schmidiger	330
2	(United States) Isaiah Nelson	269
3	(Canada) Justin Alkier	256
4	(United States) Jimmy Krupka	242
5	(Canada) William St-Germain	224

== Women ==
=== Calendar ===
Stage	Date	Place	Discipline	Winner	Second	Third	Details
1	30 November 2022	(United States) Copper Mountain	Giant slalom	(Canada) Britt Richardson	(Canada) Cassidy Gray	(United States) AJ Hurt	
2	1 December 2022	(United States) Copper Mountain	Giant slalom	(Canada) Britt Richardson	(Sweden) Sara Rask	(United States) Kjersti Mortiz	
3	2 December 2022	(United States) Copper Mountain	Slalom	(United States) Allie Resnick	(United States) Zoe Zimmermann	(Canada) Kiki Alexander	
4	3 December 2022	(United States) Copper Mountain	Slalom	(Canada) Kiki Alexander	(Sweden) Sara Rask	(United States) Zoe Zimmermann	
5	7 December 2022	(United States) Copper Mountain	Downhill	(United States) Tricia Mangan	(United States) Allison Mollin	(United States) Cheyenne Brown	
6	8 December 2022	(United States) Copper Mountain	Downhill	(United States) Tricia Mangan	(United States) Lauren Macuga	(United States) Haley Cutler	
7	9 December 2022	(United States) Copper Mountain	Super-G	(Canada) Kiki Alexander	(Canada) Sarah Bennett	(United States) Mary Bocock	
8	9 December 2022	(United States) Copper Mountain	Super-G	(Canada) Kiki Alexander	(Canada) Sarah Bennett	(United States) Haley Cutler	
9	3 January 2023	(United States) Stratton	Slalom	(Sweden) Sara Rask	(Germany) Nora Brand	(United States) Allie Resnick	
10	4 January 2023	(United States) Stratton	Slalom	(Germany) Nora Brand	(Sweden) Sara Rask	(United Kingdom) Reece Bell	
11	8 January 2023	(United States) Burke Mountain	Super-G	(United States) Tricia Mangan	(United States) Tatum Grosdidier	(United States) Mary Bocock	
12	8 January 2023	(United States) Burke Mountain	Super-G	(United States) Mary Bocock	(United States) Tatum Grosdidier	(United States) Haley Cutler	
13	23 February 2023	(Canada) Camp Fortune	Slalom	(United States) Nina O'Brien	(United States) Zoe Zimmermann	(United States) Lila Lapanja	
14	24 February 2023	(Canada) Mont Ste. Marie	Giant slalom	(United States) Nina O'Brien	(Czech Republic) Adriana Jelinkova	(United States) Katie Hensien	
15	27 February 2023	(Canada) Georgian Peaks	Giant slalom	(Canada) Cassidy Gray	(United States) Katie Hensien	(Canada) Britt Richardson	
16	28 February 2023	(Canada) Georgian Peaks	Giant slalom	(Canada) Cassidy Gray	(United States) Nina O'Brien	(Canada) Britt Richardson	
17	1 March 2023	(Canada) Osler Bluff	Slalom	(Canada) Ali Nullmeyer	(Australia) Madison Hoffman	(United States) Katie Hensien	
18	2 March 2023	(Canada) Osler Bluff	Slalom	(United States) Katie Hensien	(Australia) Madison Hoffman	(United States) Zoe Zimmermann	
19	5 March 2023	(United States) Stratton	Giant slalom	(United States) Mary Bocock	(Canada) Cassidy Gray	(United States) Elisabeth Bocock	
20	6 March 2023	(United States) Stratton	Giant slalom	(Australia) Madison Hoffman	(United States) Mary Bocock	(United States) Elisabeth Bocock	
21	22 March 2023	(Canada) Whistler	Downhill	(United States) Lauren Macuga	(Canada) Cassidy Gray	(Canada) Britt Richardson	
22	23 March 2023	(Canada) Whistler	Downhill	(United States) Lauren Macuga	(United States) Tricia Mangan	(United States) Mary Bocock	
	25 March 2023	(Canada) Whistler	Super-G	cancelled			
23	26 March 2023	(Canada) Whistler	Super-G	(United States) Mary Bocock	(United States) Lauren Macuga	(United States) Tricia Mangan	
24	27 March 2023	(Canada) Whistler	Giant slalom	(Canada) Britt Richardson	(Australia) Madison Hoffman	(United States) Allie Resnick	
25	28 March 2023	(Canada) Whistler	Slalom	(United States) Lila Lapanja	(United States) Liv Moritz	(United States) Dasha Romanov	

=== Rankings ===
==== Overall ====
Rank	after 25 of 25 races	Points
1	(United States) Mary Bocock	883
2	(Canada) Cassidy Gray	876
3	(United States) Dasha Romanov	720
4	(Canada) Britt Richardson	715
5	(United States) Allie Resnick	631

==== Downhill ====
Rank	after 4 of 4 races	Points
1	(United States) Tricia Mangan	280
1	(United States) Lauren Macuga	280
3	(United States) Haley Cutler	196
4	(United States) Cheyenne Brown	172
5	(Canada) Skylar Sheppard	146

==== Super-G ====
Rank	after 5 of 5 races	Points
1	(United States) Mary Bocock	320
2	(United States) Tricia Mangan	250
3	(United States) Tatum Grosdidier	213
4	(Canada) Kiki Alexander	200
5	(United States) Haley Cutler	200

==== Giant slalom ====
Rank	after 8 of 8 races	Points
1	(Canada) Cassidy Gray	505
2	(Canada) Britt Richardson	501
3	(United States) Mary Bocock	398
4	(Australia) Madison Hoffman	327
5	(United States) Elisabeth Bocock	242

==== Slalom ====
Rank	after 8 of 8 races	Points
1	(United States) Allie Resnick	401
2	(United States) Zoe Zimmermann	375
3	(Sweden) Sara Rask	310
4	(Germany) Nora Brand	281
5	(United States) Lila Lapanja	250
