= Delia Durrer =

Swiss alpine skier (born 2002)

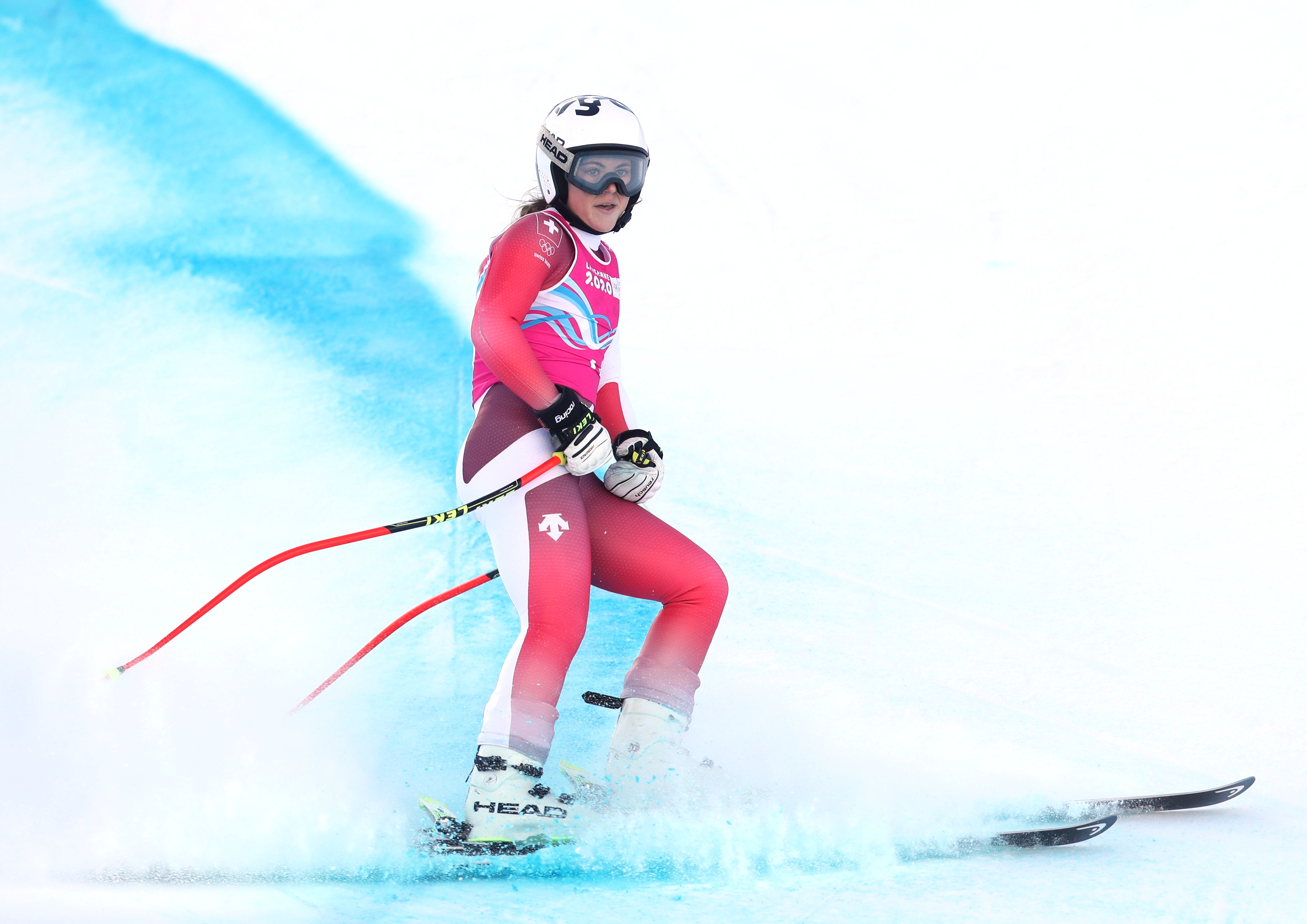
- Durrer at the 2020 Winter Youth Olympics

Personal information
- Born: 14 November 2002 (age 23) Oberdorf, Nidwalden, Switzerland
- Height: 1.64 m (5 ft 5 in)

Skiing career
- Country: Switzerland
- Sport: Alpine skiing ♀
- Club: Beckenried-Klewenalp
- Disciplines: Downhill, Super-G
- World Cup debut: 26 February 2021 (age 18)

Olympics
- Teams: 1 – (2026)
- Medals: 0

World Championships
- Teams: 0

World Cup
- Seasons: 5 – (2022–2026)
- Podiums: 0
- Overall titles: 0 – (64th in 2024)
- Discipline titles: 0 – (26th in DH, 2024)
Medal record
Women's alpine skiing
Representing Switzerland
World Junior Championships
Bronze medal – third place	2022 Panorama	Team parallel

Delia Carmen Durrer (born 14 November 2002) is a Swiss World Cup alpine ski racer and specializes in the speed events of downhill and super-G. She represented Switzerland at the 2026 Winter Olympics. During her brief career, her best World Cup result is thirteenth in a downhill at Lake Louise, Canada.

== World Cup results ==
=== Season standings ===
Season
Season	Age	Overall	Slalom	Giant slalom	Super-G	Downhill
2022	19	128	—	—	54	—
2023	20	79	—	—	47	28
2024	21	64	—	—	30	26
2025	22	77	—	—	43	31
2026	23	88	—	—	40	29

Standings through 31 January 2026

=== Top twenty finishes ===
- 0 podiums, 10 top twenties

Season
Season	Date	Location	Discipline	Place
2023	2 Dec 2022	Lake Louise, Canada	Downhill	20th
2023	3 Dec 2022	Lake Louise, Canada	Downhill	13th
2024	9 Dec 2022	St. Moritz, Switzerland	Downhill	19th
2024	16 Dec 2023	Val d'Isère, France	Downhill	15th
2024	13 Jan 2024	Altenmarkt-Zauchensee, Austria	Downhill	19th
2024	14 Jan 2024	Altenmarkt-Zauchensee, Austria	Super-G	20th
2024	3 Mar 2024	Kvitfjell, Norway	Super-G	20th
2025	18 Jan 2025	Cortina d'Ampezzo, Italy	Downhill	19th
2025	28 Feb 2025	Kvitfjell, Norway	Downhill	20th
2026	20 Dec 2025	Val d'Isère, France	Downhill	18th

== Olympic results ==
Year
Year	Age	Slalom	Giant slalom	Super-G	Downhill	Team combined
2026	23	—	—	17	—	DNF2
