= Clara Direz =

French alpine skier (born 1995)

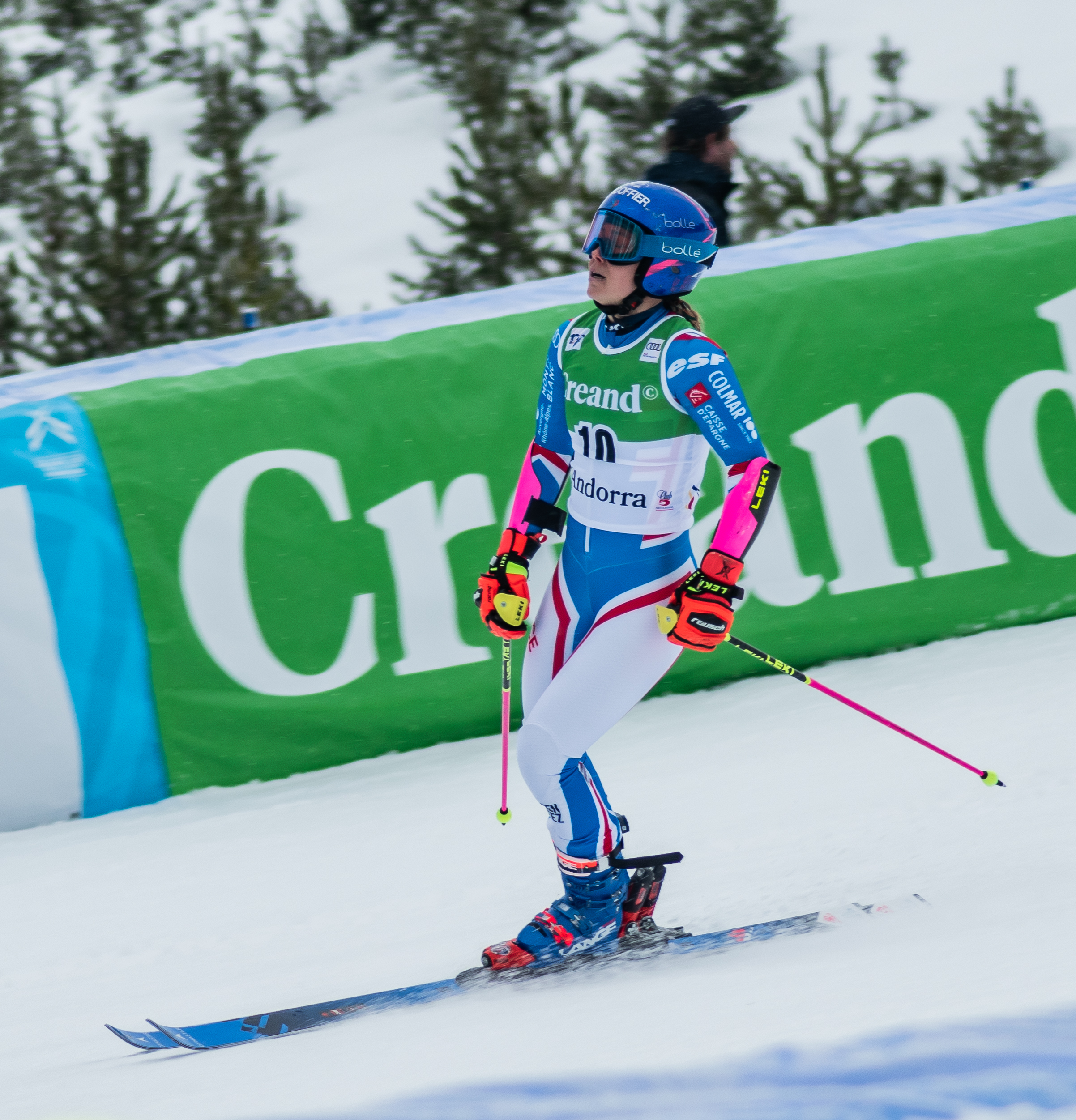
- Direz in 2024

Personal information
- Born: 5 April 1995 (age 31) Sallanches, France
- Height: 166 cm (5 ft 5 in)
- Weight: 59 kg (130 lb)

Skiing career
- Country: France
- Sport: Alpine skiing
- Disciplines: Giant slalom
- World Cup debut: 26 January 2013 (aged 17)

Olympics
- Teams: 2 – (2022, 2026)
- Medals: 0

World Championships
- Teams: 3 – (2019, 2023, 2025)
- Medals: 0

World Cup
- Seasons: 13 – (2013–2020, 2022–2026)
- Wins: 1 – (1 PG)
- Podiums: 1 – (1 PG)
- Overall titles: 0 – (36th in 2020)
- Discipline titles: 0 – (2nd in PAR, 2020)

Clara Direz (born 5 April 1995) is a French World Cup alpine ski racer, a giant slalom specialist.

== Career ==
In January 2013, Direz made her World Cup debut in the giant slalom at Maribor, Slovenia. In January 2020, she scored her first World Cup win and achieved her first podium in the Parallel giant slalom in Sestriere, Italy.

== World Cup results ==
=== Season standings ===
Season
Season	Age	Overall	Slalom	Giant slalom	Super-G	Downhill	Combined	Parallel
2016	20	102	—	42	—	—	—	—N/a
2017	21	no World Cup points earned						—N/a
2018	22	128	—	54	—	—	—	—N/a
2019	23	101	—	39	—	—	—	—N/a
2020	24	36	—	18	—	—	—	2nd place, silver medalist(s)
2021	25	injured – did not compete						
2022	26	91	—	40	—	—	—N/a	—
2023	27	96	—	41	—	—	—N/a	—N/a
2024	28	46	—	16	—	—	—N/a	—N/a
2025	29	95	—	38	—	—	—N/a	—N/a
2026	30	70	—	26	—	—	—N/a	—N/a

=== Top-ten results ===
- 1 win (1 PG)
- 1 podium (1 PG), 7 top tens

Season
Season	Date	Location	Discipline	Place
2020	28 December 2019	Lienz, Austria	Giant slalom	7th
2020	19 January 2020	Sestriere, Italy	Parallel-G	1st
2024	2 December 2023	Tremblant, Canada	Giant slalom	4th
2024	9 March 2024	Åre, Sweden	Giant slalom	7th
2024	17 March 2024	Saalbach, Austria	Giant slalom	9th
2026	6 December 2025	Tremblant, Canada	Giant slalom	5th

== World Championships results ==
Year
Year	Age	Slalom	Giant slalom	Super-G	Downhill	Combined	Team combined	Parallel	Team event
2019	23	—	8	—	—	—	—N/a	—N/a	—
2023	27	—	—	—	—	—	—N/a	—	7
2025	29	—	—	—	—	—N/a	—	—N/a	8

== Olympic results ==
Year
Year	Age	Slalom	Giant slalom	Super-G	Downhill	Combined	Team combined
2022	26	—	19	—	—	—	—N/a
2026	30	—	DNF1	—	—	—N/a	—
