= Kajsa Vickhoff Lie =

Norwegian alpine skier (born 1998)

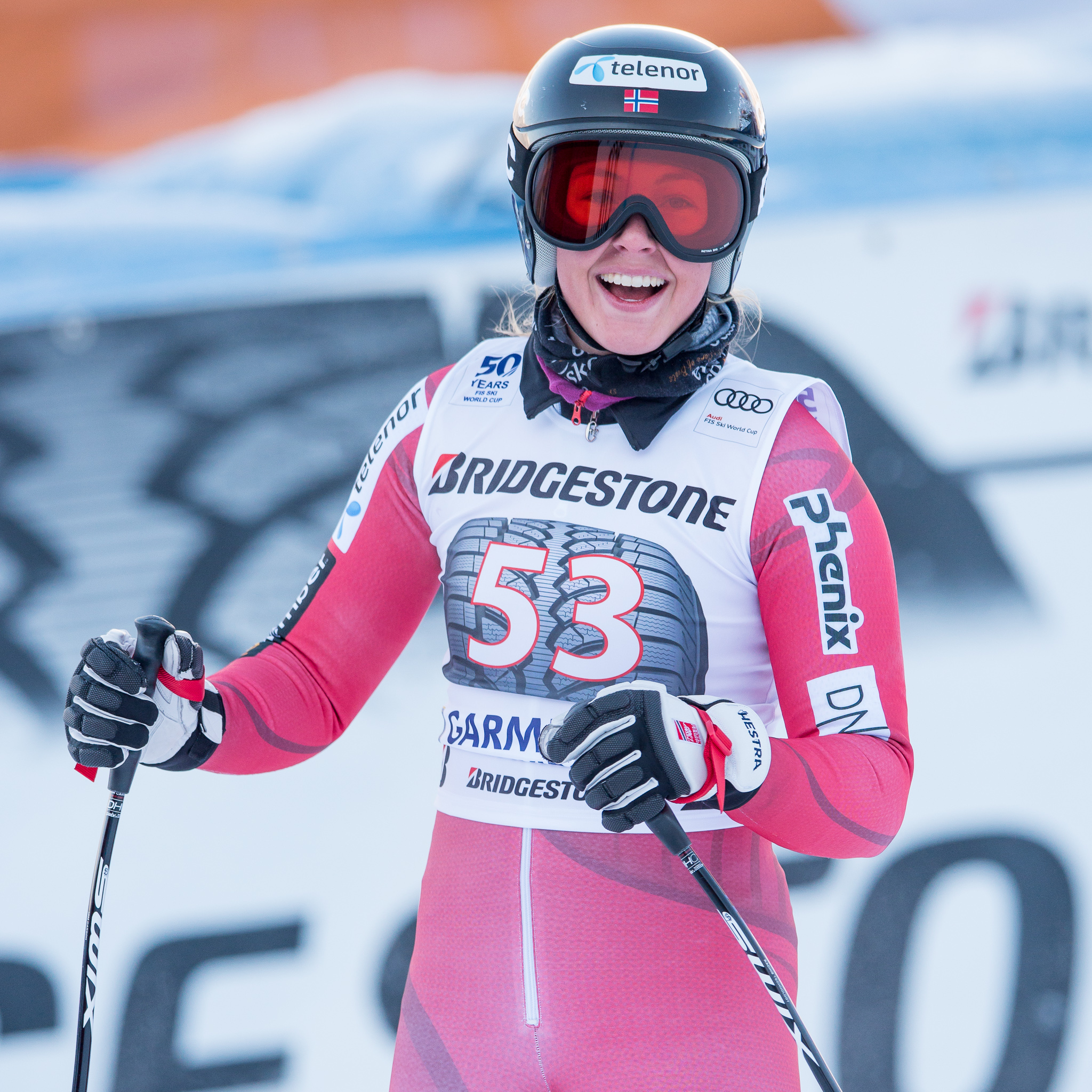
- At Garmisch-Partenkirchen in 2017

Personal information
- Born: 20 June 1998 (age 28)
- Height: 1.67 m (5 ft 6 in)

Skiing career
- Country: Norway
- Sport: Alpine skiing
- Club: Bærums SK
- Disciplines: Super-G, Downhill, Combined
- World Cup debut: 21 January 2017 (age 18)

Olympics
- Teams: 1 – (2026)
- Medals: 0

World Championships
- Teams: 4 – (2019–2025)
- Medals: 2 (0 gold)

World Cup
- Seasons: 8 – (2017–2021, 2023–2026)
- Wins: 1 – (1 DH)
- Podiums: 11 – (4 DH, 7 SG)
- Overall titles: 0 – (14th in 2024, 2025, 2026)
- Discipline titles: 0 – (4th in SG, 2025 and 2026)
Medal record
Women's alpine skiing
Representing Norway
World Cup race podiums
Event	1st	2nd	3rd
Super-G	0	5	2
Downhill	1	3	0
Total	1	8	2
World Championships
Bronze medal – third place	2023 Méribel	Super-G
Bronze medal – third place	2025 Saalbach	Super-G
Junior World Championships
Gold medal – first place	2018 Davos	Downhill
Gold medal – first place	2018 Davos	Super-G
Silver medal – second place	2018 Davos	Team

Kajsa Vickhoff Lie (born 20 June 1998) is a Norwegian World Cup alpine ski racer, representing the club Bærums SK. She specializes in the speed events of downhill and super-G.

== Career ==
Vickhoff Lie made her World Cup debut at age 18 in January 2017, and has competed in four World Championships in 2019, 2021, 2023 and 2025.

She won gold medals in downhill and super-G at the Junior World Championships at Davos in 2018.

Vickhoff Lie was airlifted to hospital after suffering a left leg injury during the women's super-G World Cup race at Val di Fassa, Italy on 28 February 2021. She was thrown off the course after catching an edge and landed awkwardly in the safety nets.

In February 2023, Vickhoff Lie won her first world championships medal, taking bronze in super-G at Méribel, France. Her first World Cup victory came a few weeks later in a downhill at Kvitfjell, Norway. That victory was the first ever for the Norwegian women's team in a World Cup downhill.

In January 2025, Vickhoff Lie placed second in a downhill world cup race in Cortina, Italy. On 26 January 2025 she placed second in a Super-G world cup race in Garmisch-Patenkirchen.

At consecutive World Championships, Vickhoff Lie shared the bronze medal in super-G; with Cornelia Hütter (Austria) in 2023 and Lauren Macuga (USA) in 2025.

== World Cup results ==
=== Season standings ===
Season
Season	Age	Overall	Slalom	Giant slalom	Super-G	Downhill	Combined
2018	19	92	—	—	46	48	23
2019	20	48	—	—	15	40	15
2020	21	46	—	—	20	32	—
2021	22	18	—	—	7	11	—N/a
2022	23	Injured, out for season					—N/a
2023	24	26	—	—	21	8	—N/a
2024	25	14	—	34	5	16	—N/a
2025	26	14	—	27	4	11	—N/a
2026	27	14	—	39	4	10	—N/a

=== Race podiums ===
- 1 win – (1 DH)
- 11 podiums – (4 DH, 7 SG), 39 top tens

Season
Season	Date	Location	Discipline	Place
2021	30 January 2021	Garmisch-Partenkirchen, Germany	Super-G	2nd
2023	21 January 2023	Cortina d'Ampezzo, Italy	Downhill	2nd
2023	4 March 2023	Kvitfjell, Norway	Downhill	1st
2024	17 December 2023	Val d'Isère, France	Super-G	2nd
2024	12 January 2024	Altenmarkt-Zauchensee, Austria	Super-G	2nd
2024	22 March 2024	Saalbach-Hinterglemm, Austria	Super-G	3rd
2025	18 January 2025	Cortina d'Ampezzo, Italy	Downhill	2nd
2025	26 January 2025	Garmisch-Partenkirchen, Germany	Super-G	2nd
2026	10 January 2026	Altenmarkt-Zauchensee, Austria	Downhill	2nd
2026	1 March 2026	Soldeu, Andorra	Super-G	3rd
2026	8 March 2026	Val di Fassa, Italy	Super-G	2nd

== World Championship results ==
Year
Year	Age	Slalom	Giant slalom	Super-G	Downhill	Combined	Team combined
2019	20	—	—	13	19	7	—N/a
2021	22	—	—	5	16	DNF2	—N/a
2023	24	—	—	3	15	DNF1	—N/a
2025	26	—	16	3	14	—N/a	DNF2

== Olympic results ==
Year
Year	Age	Slalom	Giant slalom	Super-G	Downhill	Team combined
2026	27	—	DNF2	5	7	11
