= Britt Richardson =

Canadian alpine skier (born 2003)

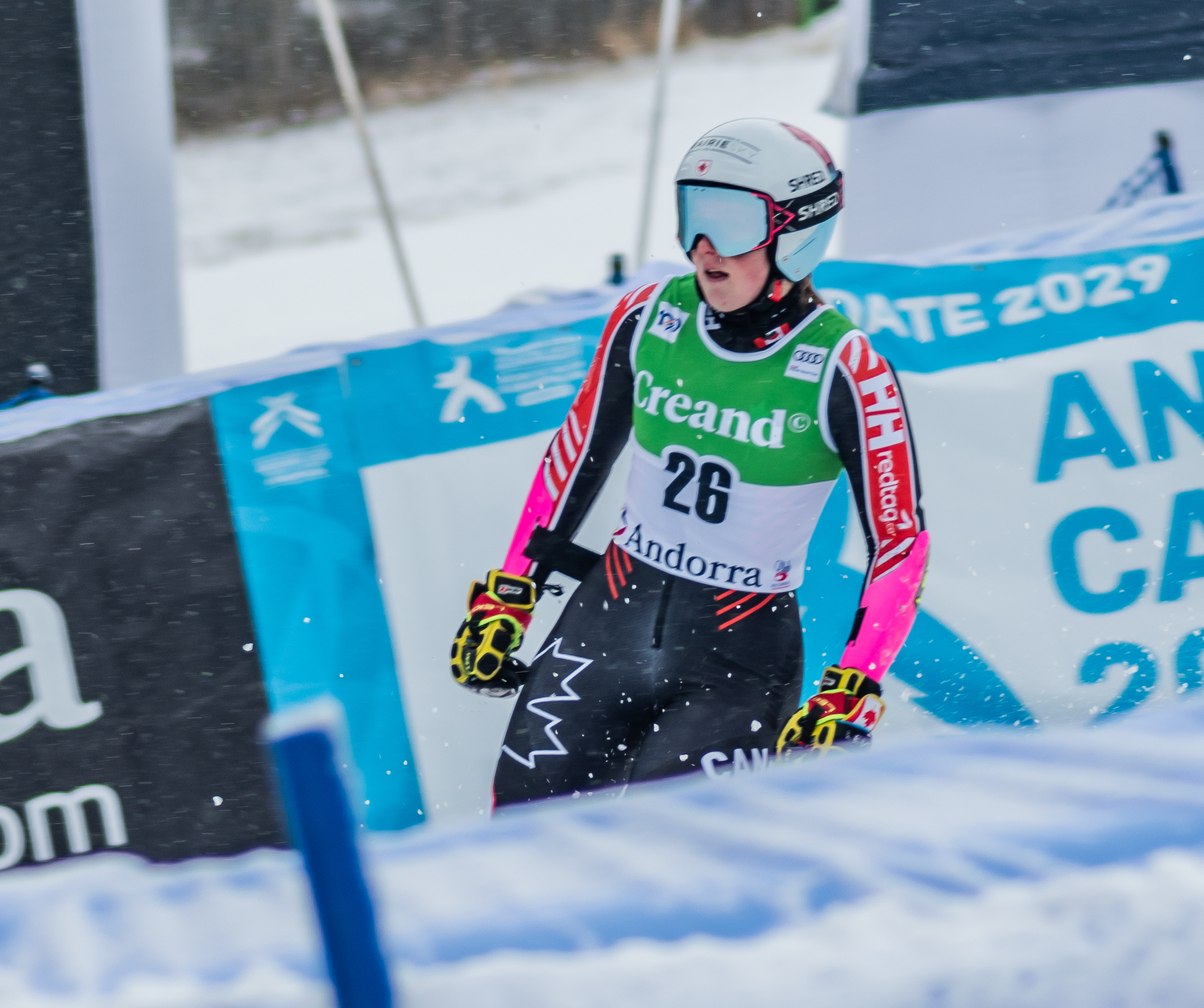
- At Soldeu in February 2024

Personal information
- Born: 25 May 2003 (age 23) Canmore, Alberta, Canada

Skiing career
- Country: Canada
- Sport: Alpine skiing
- Club: Calgary Alpine
- Disciplines: Giant slalom
- World Cup debut: October 23, 2021 (age 18)

Olympics
- Teams: 1 – (2026)
- Medals: 0

World Championships
- Teams: 2 – (2023, 2025)
- Medals: 1 (0 gold)

World Cup
- Seasons: 5 – (2022–2026)
- Podiums: 0
- Overall titles: 0 – (47th in 2026)
- Discipline titles: 0 – (15th in GS, 2026)
Medal record
Women's alpine skiing
Representing Canada
International competitions
Event	1st	2nd	3rd
World Championships	0	0	1
World Junior Championships	1	0	0
World Championships
Bronze medal – third place	2023 Méribel	Team event
World Junior Championships
Gold medal – first place	2024 Port du Soleil	Giant slalom

Britt Richardson (born 25 May 2003) is a Canadian World Cup alpine ski racer who specializes in giant slalom.

== Career ==
At age 19, Richardson won a bronze medal at the 2023 World Championships in the team event; the following year, she won the gold medal in giant slalom at the 2024 Junior World Championships.

During the 2024 World Cup season, Richardson had five top twenty finishes in giant slalom, and was 26th in the giant slalom standings.

She entered the 2024–25 season off a year that saw her crack the top 30 eight times, including a 15th-place finish at Mt. Tremblant.

At the 2025 World Championships, she was tenth in the giant slalom.

== World Cup results ==
=== Season standings ===
Season
Season	Age	Overall	Slalom	Giant slalom	Super-G	Downhill	Parallel
2022	18	114	—	48	—	—	—
2023	19	110	—	44	—	—	—N/a
2024	20	66	—	26	—	—	—N/a
2025	21	57	—	21	—	—	—N/a
2026	22	47	—	15	—	—	—N/a

=== Top-ten results ===
- 0 podiums, 2 top tens

Season
Season	Date	Location	Discipline	Place
2025	21 January 2025	Kronplatz, Italy	Giant slalom	7th
2026	24 January 2026	(Czech Republic) Špindlerův Mlýn, Czech Republic	Giant slalom	9th

== World Championship results ==
Year
Year	Age	Slalom	Giant slalom	Super-G	Downhill	Combined	Team combined	Parallel	Team event
2023	19	—	21	—	—	—	—N/a	—	3
2025	21	—	10	—	—	—N/a	—	—N/a	—

== Olympic results ==
Year
Year	Age	Slalom	Giant slalom	Super-G	Downhill	Team combined
2026	22	—	26	—	—	—
