= Tricia Mangan =

American alpine skier (born 1997)

Personal information
- Full name: Patricia Mangan
- Born: March 7, 1997 (age 29) Buffalo, New York, United States
- Height: 5 ft 8 in (173 cm)

Skiing career
- Country: United States
- Sport: Alpine skiing
- Club: HoliMont Snowsports
- Disciplines: Downhill, super-G, combined
- World Cup debut: 26 November 2016 (age 19)

Olympics
- Teams: 2 – (2018, 2022)
- Medals: 0

World Championships
- Teams: 1 – (2023)
- Medals: 0

World Cup
- Seasons: 9 – (2017–2019, 2021–2026)
- Podiums: 0
- Overall titles: 0 – (102nd in 2023 & 2025)
- Discipline titles: 0 – (31st in AC, 2018)

Patricia Mangan (born March 7, 1997) is an American World Cup alpine skier. She represented the United States at the 2018 and 2022 Winter Olympics.

== Siblings ==
Mangan has a brother, Andrew Mangan, who is a notable U.S. pararower. Andrew has competed internationally in pararowing events, representing the United States in adaptive sports competitions.

== World Cup results ==
=== Season standings ===
Season
Season	Age	Overall	Slalom	Giant slalom	Super-G	Downhill	Combined
2018	20	114	—	—	—	—	31
2019	21	no World Cup points earned					
2020	22	did not participate					
2021	23	no World Cup points earned					—N/a
2022	24	no World Cup points earned					—N/a
2023	25	102	—	—	—	39	—N/a
2024	26	103	—	—	45	47	—N/a
2025	27	102	—	—	40	—	—N/a
2026	28	88	—	—	25	—	—N/a

Standings through 31 January 2026

=== Top twenty finishes ===
- 0 podiums, 3 top twenties

Season
Season	Date	Location	Discipline	Place
2018	26 January 2018	Lenzerheide, Switzerland	Combined	19th
2023	16 December 2022	St. Moritz, Switzerland	Downhill	17th
2026	31 January 2026	Crans-Montana, Switzerland	Super-G	19th

== World Championships results ==
Year
Year	Age	Slalom	Giant slalom	Super-G	Downhill	Combined	Parallel	Team event
2023	25	—	—	DNF	23	DNF1	—	—

== Olympic results ==
Year
Year	Age	Slalom	Giant slalom	Super-G	Downhill	Combined	Team event
2018	20	—	DNF1	—	—	—	9
2022	24	—	—	—	—	11	—
