= FIS Alpine World Ski Championships 2025 – Women's giant slalom =

Women's giant slalom at the FIS Alpine World Ski Championships 2025
- Venue: Skicircus Saalbach-Hinterglemm/Leogang
- Location: Saalbach-Hinterglemm, Austria
- Dates: 13 February
- Competitors: 108 from 51 nations
- Winning time: 2:22.71

Medalists
gold medal	Federica Brignone	Italy
silver medal	Alice Robinson	New Zealand
bronze medal	Paula Moltzan	United States

Women's Giant Slalom
- Location: Schneekristall/Zwolfer; Saalbach, Austria
- Vertical: 398 m (1,306 ft)
- Top elevation: 1,459 m (4,787 ft)
- Base elevation: 1,061 m (3,481 ft)

The Women's giant slalom competition at the FIS Alpine World Ski Championships 2025 was held on Thursday, 13 February 2025.

== Results ==
The first run was started at 09:45 and the second run at 13:15.

Rank	Bib	Name	Nation	Run 1	Rank	Run 2	Rank	Total	Diff
1st place, gold medalist(s)	4	Federica Brignone	Italy	1:10.44	1	1:12.27	1	2:22.71	—
2nd place, silver medalist(s)	5	Alice Robinson	New Zealand	1:11.11	2	1:12.50	2	2:23.61	+0.90
3rd place, bronze medalist(s)	7	Paula Moltzan	United States	1:11.68	3	1:13.65	15	2:25.33	+2.62
4	1	Thea Louise Stjernesund	Norway	1:12.22	6	1:13.12	9	2:25.34	+2.63
5	6	Lara Gut-Behrami	Switzerland	1:11.84	4	1:13.55	13	2:25.39	+2.68
6	2	Sara Hector	Sweden	1:11.87	5	1:13.72	19	2:25.59	+2.88
7	11	Lara Colturi	Albania	1:12.92	9	1:13.29	10	2:26.21	+3.50
8	3	Zrinka Ljutić	Croatia	1:12.67	8	1:13.58	14	2:26.25	+3.54
9	20	Lena Dürr	Germany	1:12.33	7	1:13.94	22	2:26.27	+3.56
10	25	Britt Richardson	Canada	1:14.05	18	1:12.55	4	2:26.60	+3.89
11	12	Camille Rast	Switzerland	1:13.76	13	1:13.05	8	2:26.81	+4.10
12	18	Katharina Liensberger	Austria	1:13.37	12	1:13.89	21	2:27.26	+4.55
13	14	AJ Hurt	United States	1:13.77	15	1:13.54	12	2:27.31	+4.60
14	16	Valérie Grenier	Canada	1:14.52	20	1:12.85	7	2:27.37	+4.66
15	24	Maryna Gąsienica-Daniel	Poland	1:14.84	24	1:12.55	4	2:27.39	+4.68
16	19	Kajsa Vickhoff Lie	Norway	1:13.81	16	1:13.67	18	2:27.48	+4.77
17	15	Mina Fürst Holtmann	Norway	1:13.76	13	1:13.74	20	2:27.50	+4.79
18	21	Stephanie Brunner	Austria	1:14.90	25	1:12.63	6	2:27.53	+4.82
19	10	Nina O'Brien	United States	1:13.35	11	1:14.27	24	2:27.62	+4.91
20	29	Estelle Alphand	Sweden	1:15.20	28	1:12.51	3	2:27.71	+5.00
21	23	Neja Dvornik	Slovenia	1:14.75	21	1:13.65	15	2:28.40	+5.69
22	27	Katie Hensien	United States	1:14.81	23	1:13.66	17	2:28.47	+5.76
23	35	Emma Aicher	Germany	1:15.16	27	1:13.34	11	2:28.50	+5.79
24	26	Ana Bucik	Slovenia	1:14.77	22	1:13.99	23	2:28.76	+6.05
25	17	Wendy Holdener	Switzerland	1:14.00	17	1:14.80	26	2:28.80	+6.09
26	28	Michelle Gisin	Switzerland	1:15.14	26	1:14.78	25	2:29.92	+7.21
27	31	Magdalena Łuczak	Poland	1:15.80	32	1:15.24	29	2:31.04	+8.33
28	43	Katharina Truppe	Austria	1:16.21	34	1:14.97	28	2:31.18	+8.47
29	41	Lisa Nyberg	Sweden	1:16.32	35	1:14.94	27	2:31.26	+8.55
30	36	Hanna Aronsson Elfman	Sweden	1:15.92	33	1:16.61	31	2:32.53	+9.82
31	40	Fabiana Dorigo	Germany	1:16.36	36	1:16.30	30	2:32.66	+9.95
32	47	Rebeka Jančová	Slovakia	1:17.65	37	1:17.44	32	2:35.09	+12.38
33	48	Anina Zurbriggen	Bulgaria	1:18.32	40	1:18.32	33	2:36.64	+13.93
34	53	Molly Butler	United Kingdom	1:18.22	39	1:19.11	34	2:37.33	+14.62
35	46	Kim Vanreusel	Belgium	1:18.10	38	1:19.50	35	2:37.60	+14.89
36	49	Gwyneth ten Raa	Luxembourg	1:19.25	42	1:20.19	36	2:39.44	+16.73
37	52	Sarah Schleper	Mexico	1:19.00	41	1:21.38	41	2:40.38	+17.67
38	45	Giselle Gorringe	United Kingdom	1:19.84	46	1:21.16	40	2:40.38	+17.67
39	54	Lois Jackson	United Kingdom	1:20.48	47	1:20.62	37	2:40.38	+17.67
40	67	Abi Bruce	United Kingdom	1:20.48	47	1:20.99	39	2:40.38	+17.67
41	61	Zita Tóth	Hungary	1:20.92	50	1:20.97	38	2:40.38	+17.67
42	64	Aruwin Salehhuddin	Malaysia	1:25.05	55	1:23.98	42	2:40.38	+17.67
43	79	Esma Alić	Bosnia and Herzegovina	1:24.88	53	1:24.18	43	2:40.38	+17.67
44	57	Dora Ljutić	Croatia	1:22.40	51	1:27.37	47	2:40.38	+17.67
45	77	Nuunu Chemnitz Berthelsen	Denmark	1:25.74	56	1:25.87	44	2:51.61	+28.90
46	75	Mialitiana Clerc	Madagascar	1:24.79	52	1:26.97	46	2:51.76	+29.05
47	65	Joyce ten Raa	Luxembourg	1:26.91	58	1:26.22	45	2:53.13	+30.42
48	82	Nikolina Dragoljević	Bosnia and Herzegovina	1:28.34	59	1:29.42	48	2:57.76	+35.05
	74	Lili Polányi	Hungary	1:26.38	57	Did not finish			
	68	Hanna Majtényi	Hungary	1:25.02	54	Did not finish			
	60	Clara-Marie Holmer Vorre	Denmark	1:19.65	45	Did not finish			
	59	Hófi Dóra Friðgeirsdóttir	Iceland	1:19.54	44	Did not finish			
	51	Anastasiia Shepilenko	Ukraine	1:20.53	49	Did not finish			
	62	Noa Szőllős	Israel	1:19.49	43	Did not finish			
	39	Charlotte Lingg	Liechtenstein	1:15.41	30	Did not finish			
	34	Francesca Baruzzi	Argentina	1:15.30	29	Did not finish			
	22	Clara Direz	France	1:14.16	19	Did not finish			
	9	Julia Scheib	Austria	1:12.94	10	Did not finish			
	88	Bernadett Balogh Lőrinc	Romania	1:28.91	60	Disqualified			
	30	Lara Della Mea	Italy	1:15.45	31	Did not start			
	87	Maria Nikoleta Kaltsogianni	Greece	1:30.49	61	Did not qualify			
	83	Ioana Corlățeanu	Romania	1:30.61	62	Did not qualify			
	81	Lirika Deva	Kosovo	1:30.72	63	Did not qualify			
	86	Andrea Loizidou	Cyprus	1:34.61	64	Did not qualify			
	89	Manon Chad	Lebanon	1:35.42	65	Did not qualify			
	91	Albina Ivanova	Kyrgyzstan	1:36.35	66	Did not qualify			
	95	Melina Gounaris	Greece	1:37.33	67	Did not qualify			
	97	Olga Paliutkina	Kyrgyzstan	1:37.44	68	Did not qualify			
	99	Zahra Alizadeh	Iran	1:37.67	69	Did not qualify			
	93	Valeriya Kovaleva	Uzbekistan	1:39.21	70	Did not qualify			
	90	Sabina Rejepova	Uzbekistan	1:39.63	71	Did not qualify			
	100	Atena Kiashemshaki	Iran	1:41.09	72	Did not qualify			
	98	Sarah Stephan	Lebanon	1:42.36	73	Did not qualify			
	104	Aanchal Thakur	India	1:44.44	74	Did not qualify			
	103	Arba Pupovci	Kosovo	1:45.22	75	Did not qualify			
	101	Christa Rahme	Lebanon	1:53.96	76	Did not qualify			
	107	Debora Timalsina	Nepal	2:16.44	77	Did not qualify			
	106	Celine Marti	Haiti	2:24.02	78	Did not qualify			
	109	Sandhya Sandhya	India	Did not finish					
	108	Kseniya Grigoreva	Uzbekistan	Did not finish					
	96	Eloise King	Hong Kong	Did not finish					
	94	Evridiki Dimitrof	Greece	Did not finish					
	85	Kiana Sakkal	Lebanon	Did not finish					
	80	Ina Likić	Bosnia and Herzegovina	Did not finish					
	78	Dóra Körtvélyessy	Hungary	Did not finish					
	76	Ariana Haben Ribeiro	Portugal	Did not finish					
	73	Maria Constantin	Romania	Did not finish					
	72	Maria-Eleni Tsiovolou	Greece	Did not finish					
	71	Kiana Kryeziu	Kosovo	Did not finish					
	70	Ceren Reyhan Yıldırım	Turkey	Did not finish					
	69	Nino Tsiklauri	Georgia	Did not finish					
	66	Yuliia Makovetska	Ukraine	Did not finish					
	63	Matilde Schwencke	Chile	Did not finish					
	62	Noa Rabou	Netherlands	Did not finish					
	58	Elvedina Muzaferija	Bosnia and Herzegovina	Did not finish					
	56	Noa Blok	Netherlands	Did not finish					
	55	Phoebe Heaydon	Australia	Did not finish					
	50	Kiara Derks	Netherlands	Did not finish					
	42	Madeleine Sylvester-Davik	Norway	Did not finish					
	38	Clarisse Brèche	France	Did not finish					
	37	Erika Pykäläinen	Finland	Did not finish					
	32	Cassidy Gray	Canada	Did not finish					
	13	Marta Bassino	Italy	Did not finish					
	8	Sofia Goggia	Italy	Did not finish					
	105	Tanuja Thakur	India	Disqualified					
	102	Mahsa Yarkhah	Iran	Disqualified					
	92	Sadaf Savehshemshaki	Iran	Disqualified					
	84	Lee Wen-yi	Chinese Taipei	Disqualified					
	33	Adriana Jelinkova	Czech Republic	Did not start					
