= 2024 Alpine Skiing World Cup – Women's overall =

Alpine ski discipline year standings

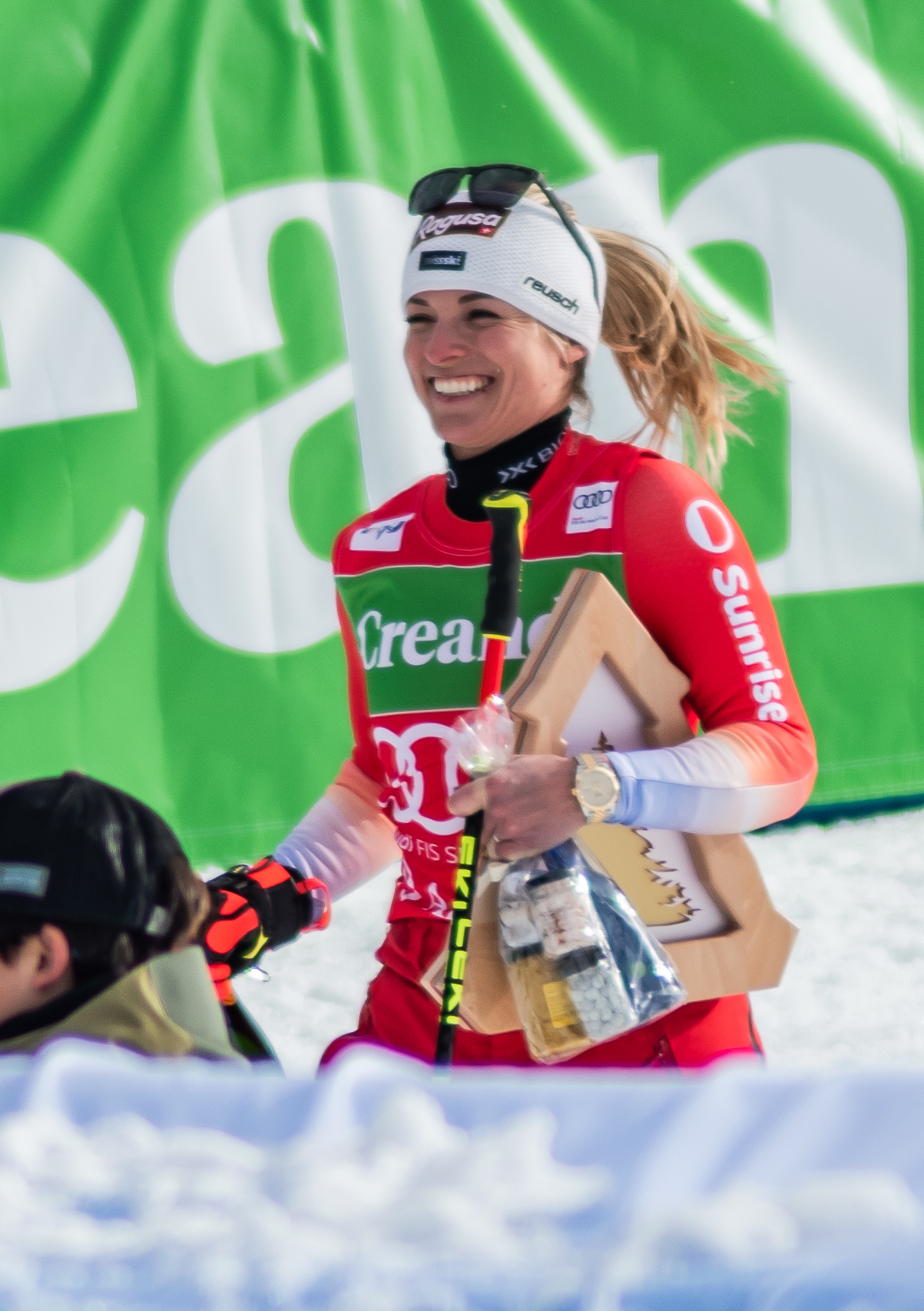
2024 Women's Overall World Cup: Lara Gut-Behrami of Switzerland, overall champion for the second time; 2024 Women's World Cup; Overall • Downhill • Super-G; Giant slalom • Slalom
Previous: 2023	Next: 2025

The women's overall competition in the 2024 FIS Alpine Skiing World Cup consisted of 39 events in four disciplines: downhill (DH) (8 races), super-G (SG) (9 races), giant slalom (GS) (11 races), and slalom (SL) (11 races). The schedule initially was planned to consist of 45 events, but two downhills on the Matterhorn in mid-November 2023 were cancelled due to high winds and not rescheduled. As noted below in the season summary, four more speed races scheduled for February were also cancelled, reducing the total number of season events to 39 (with 4 downhills and 2 super-Gs having been cancelled).

After an injury to two-time defending champion (and five-time overall champion) Mikaela Shiffrin, the season championship became a battle between 2016 overall champion Lara Gut-Behrami of Switzerland and 2020 overall champion Federica Brignone of Italy, which went down to the technical races at the finals in Saalbach-Hinterglemm, Austria before Gut-Behrami triumphed for her second overall title, eight years after her first. In addition, Gut-Behrami also won the super-G and giant slalom disciplines and was leading in the downhill discipline going into the last race of the finals, giving her the chance to tie the women's record of four titles in one season, held jointly by Americans Shiffrin (2019) and Lindsey Vonn (2010 and 2012) and Slovenian Tina Maze (2013) -- although only Shiffrin did it without a championship in the combined discipline, which Gut-Behrami was also trying to do. However, in that last race, Gut-Behrami lost the downhill discipline title to Cornelia Hütter of Austria, which nevertheless left her with three titles, including a discipline record-tying fifth in super-G.

As is the case every fourth year, there were no other major FIS events (world championships or Olympics) taking place during this season. The fifth and sixth existing disciplines, parallel (PAR) and Alpine combined (AC), were eliminated from future World Cup schedules due to a lack of participation or interest in staging these events, and a new event that had been contemplated on the tentative schedule for the season, a team combined (which had been planned for 16 February 2024 at Crans Montana), was also eliminated and replaced with an additional downhill. Thus, for the second straight season, only the four major disciplines were contested.

== Season summary ==
=== The early season: former overall champions come to the fore ===
The first three races to be held during the season were all technical events (a giant slalom and two slaloms) and saw three former overall champions (and the top three finishers from 2023) emerge victorious: 2016 champion (and 2023 runner-up) Lara Gut-Behrami of Switzerland; 2021 champion (and 2023 third place) Petra Vlhová of Slovakia; and two-time defending champion (and five-time overall champion) Mikaela Shiffrin of the United States. The next two technical events (in the US, a giant slalom and a slalom) were won by Gut-Behrami and Shiffrin (her record 90th win overall), enabling Shiffrin to open an 84-point lead for the season over Vlhová. The following two races, both giant slaloms, which ended the North American portion of the season, were both won by 2020 champion Federica Brignone, moving her into fourth place overall—which meant that the only four former women's overall champions still active occupied the top four places for the season.

The speed events (downhill and super-G) did not begin until the eighth event of the season, with three races in St. Moritz, Switzerland. The first race was easily won by three-time defending downhill champion Sofia Goggia, who triumphed by almost a second over the field. The win moved Goggia into sixth place in the season. However, Shiffrin beat Goggia in the next event, a downhill, and moved into a 195-point lead for the season over Brignone, who was third.

The next two races were speed races at Val d'Isère; Shiffrin skipped the downhill, and Brignone won the super-G, which Shiffrin failed to finish, moving Brignone to within 63 points of Shiffrin's lead. However, the last race before Christmas was another slalom, and Shiffrin's runner-up finish moved her overall lead back over 140 points. And then the final two races of 2023, both at Lienz, were a giant slalom and a slalom, both won by Shiffrin after huge first runs, which gave her 93 total World Cup victories and stretched her lead for the season over Brignone to 263 points and over Vlhova to 328 points.

=== Middle season: the last two overall champions are injured ===
The new year started in the rain and fog of Kranjska Gora, Slovenia, where Shiffrin struggled on the soft snow conditions, but her overall lead remained at over 200 points. Shiffrin then missed a three-race weekend (two super-Gs and a downhill) at Zauchensee due to personal illness. However, as the races had three different winners (Sofia Goggia in the downhill and Cornelia Hütter and Gut-Behrami in the super-Gs), the closest competitor to Shiffrin remained Brignone at 140 points behind. Shiffrin then recovered in time for the weeknight slalom in Flachau, which she won to increase her lead to 227 points over runner-up Vlhová and also tie Ingemar Stenmark's record for career podiums in one discipline (81, also in slalom.

The next race (a giant slalom at Jasná) took place about 17 km south of Vlhová's hometown, but unfortunately featured Vlhová suffering a season-ending injury near the beginning of her opening run, which made Gut-Behrami (320 points behind) and Brignone (322 points behind) into Shiffrin's closest active pursuers. Shiffrin then won the slalom the next day to all but clinch the season championship in that discipline—and break Stenmark's record for career podiums in one discipline.

However, in the very next race of the season, a downhill at Cortina d'Ampezzo, Italy, Shiffrin herself sprained a couple of ligaments, including her left MCL, in a crash that took her into the safety netting around the course; although she did not sustain season-ending ligament damage, she immediately cancelled her three planned appearances in the following week of racing and was unclear when she would return after that. In keeping with the season, both downhills there were won by different racers; five different women have won the five downhills to this point of the season, while Gut-Behrami, who moved into third in the discipline after Brignone crashed immediately after Shiffrin, also moved into the runner-up spot overall, 295 points behind Shiffrin. The plethora of crashes and serious injuries (including several other season-ending injuries) at this point in the season was contributing to a movement to require World Cup skiers to wear cut-proof underwear, described by one source as "made of resistant polyethylene substances that are said to be stronger than steel or Kevlar on a per-weight basis", to prevent cuts from their ski edges during such crashes. In the final race of the weekend, four-time super-G discipline champion Gut-Behrami took advantage of Shiffrin's absence by winning her second straight super-G to close to within 195 points of Shiffrin.

=== The stretch run: the two prior overall champions battle for the lead ===
Two days later, with Shiffrin still out, Gut-Behrami also won a giant slalom in nearby Kronplatz, which not only moved her into sixth place for all-time World Cup victories among women with 42, but also cut down Shiffrin's overall lead to 95 points. The following two races, a downhill and a super-G scheduled for the first week of February in Garmisch-Partenkirchen, Germany, were then cancelled due to warm weather, giving Shiffrin and the other injured skiers another week to recover. However, even the time off didn't affect the proliferation of injuries, with Goggia, who was again leading the downhill discipline, requiring immediate surgery after breaking two bones in her right leg while doing giant slalom training in Italy, putting her on the sidelines for the rest of the season as well. At the next race, a giant slalom in Soldeu, Andorra, Gut-Behrami won again, coming from ninth after the first run to edge Alice Robinson by one-one-hundredth of a second to accomplish two goals: (1) taking the overall lead from Shiffrin (by 5 points); and (2) virtually clinching her first career discipline title in giant slalom (with a 135-point lead over Brignone with just two races to go, and no one else still in contention). One commentator noted that Shiffrin had won her first overall championship in 2017 when Gut-Behrami, who was leading, was injured in February and missed the rest of the season, and Shiffrin came from behind to win; the question still was whether this year would be the reverse. And Gut-Behrami had won her only championship the year before, in 2016, when the same thing happened to overall leader Lindsey Vonn, ending her season—ironically at Soldeu.

In the next race, the first of two downhills at Crans Montana, Switzerland on 16 February, Gut-Behrami won again, in front of the home crowd, and stretched her lead over Shiffin to 105 points. At about the same time, Shiffrin issued a statement saying that she didn't plan to return until the giant slalom and slalom at Åre, Sweden, on 9–10 March, the week before the World Cup finals. When Gut-Behrami placed third the next day, she took over the season lead in the downhill discipline as well, giving her the current lead in every discipline except slalom as well as the overall lead. With a sixth-place finish in the third race, a super-G, Gut-Behrami's lead over Shiffrin grew to 205 points, while Brignone, who was second, closed to within 81 points of Shiffrin. Heavy snowfall in Val di Fassa, Italy prompted cancellation of both super-Gs scheduled there at the end of February, leaving only eight races in the season.

At the beginning of March, two speed races were held in Kvitfjell, but heavy snowfall wiped out both practice runs for the downhill, forcing back-to-back super-Gs to be held. Gut-behrami won the first race and was second the next day behind Brignone in a race delayed repeatedly by fog, moving Brignone past the still-absent Shiffrin into second place by 59 points, but still behind Gut-Behrami by 326 points. Shiffrin then announced that she would return for no more than three of the remaining six races in the season, meaning that she would not be able to catch Gut-Behrami, whom she congratulated for her "stunning" season, including five victories during Shiffrin's absence. That left Brignone as the only remaining threat to Gut-Behrami, and she rose to the occasion: in the next race, a giant slalom at Åre, Brignone rallied from over a second down after the first run to post the fastest time on the second run and win, which allowed her to close within 286 points. The next day, Shiffrin finally returned from her injury (after missing eleven races in total) and posted the fastest time on each leg of the slalom at Are, not only winning the race by over a second but also clinching her record-tying eighth victory in the discipline.

== Finals ==
The last events of the season are scheduled for the World Cup finals at Saalbach-Hinterglemm, Austria. This season, for the first time, the finals will take place over two weekends—16-17 March 2024 for the technical events and 22–24 March 2024 for the speed events—with the last race for the women (the downhill) taking place on Saturday, 23 March. Only the top 25 in each discipline and the winner of the Junior World Championship in each discipline are eligible to compete in the finals, with the exception that any skier who has scored at least 500 points in the overall classification is eligible to participate in any discipline, regardless of her standing in that discipline for the season.

After only 8 races, on 8 December, Shiffrin had reached the 500-point milestone for the season; by 27 January 2024 (24 races), eight skiers (Shiffrin, Vhlová, Gut-Behrami, Brignone, Goggia, Sara Hector (Sweden), Hütter, and Michelle Gisin (Switzerland)) had already reached that standard. Ultimately, heading into the finals after 35 races, 14 skiers had scored at least 500 points in all disciplines: the eight already named plus Marta Bassino (Italy), Stephanie Venier (Austria), Ragnhild Mowinckel (Norway), Alice Robinson (New Zealand). Zrinka Ljutić (Croatia), and Lena Dürr (Germany). At that point, the only skiers with points in all four disciplines were Brignone, Shiffrin, Gisin, and Emma Aicher (Germany).

In the first race in the new finals format, Shiffrin, who had already clinched the slalom discipline championship, won the slalom final for her 97th total World Cup victory (and 60th victory in slalom) in her final race of the season. In the next race, giant slalom, Brignone began the day 282 points behind Gut-Behrami with only a maximum of 300 points left. Because of the special scoring rules for the finals, the only way for Brignone to win at least a share of the season title involved two steps: (1) Brignone winning all three of the remaining finals (worth 300 points), and (2) Gut-Behrami not finishing higher than 14th in any one race (worth 18 points) and not finishing in the top 15 in the other two (worth 0 points), giving both women a season total of 1,672 points. Brignone lived up to her part of the challenge, winning the first race by almost a second and a half. However, Gut-Behrami finished that final in 10th (worth 26 points), giving her the overall season championship (208 points ahead and only 200 points remaining). Similarly, in Super-G, Brignone needed to finish at least second, with Gut-Behrami not finishing in the top eight, in order to come from behind in that discipline, and she did finish second . . . but Gut-Behrami finished seventh to hang on to that discipline title as well.

However, in the last women's race at finals (downhill), Gut-Behrami's chance of winning four season titles (overall, super-G, giant slalom, and downhill) ended when she finished almost two seconds behind Cornelia Hütter, who began the race in fourth place in the season rankings, which surprisingly gave Hütter the downhill discipline crown.

== Standings ==
#	Skier	DH; 8 races	SG; 9 races	GS; 11 races	SL; 11 races	Total
	(Switzerland) Lara Gut-Behrami	369	576	771	0	1,716
2	(Italy) Federica Brignone	281	546	750	4	1,581
3	(United States) Mikaela Shiffrin	100	50	429	830	1,409
4	(Sweden) Sara Hector	0	0	583	339	922
5	(Austria) Cornelia Hütter	397	516	0	0	913
6	(Slovakia) Petra Vlhová	0	0	297	505	802
7	(Italy) Sofia Goggia	350	237	205	0	792
8	(Switzerland) Michelle Gisin	116	163	88	418	785
9	(Italy) Marta Bassino	236	244	259	0	739
10	(Austria) Stephanie Venier	346	380	0	0	726
11	(Norway) Ragnhild Mowinckel	200	247	217	0	664
12	(New Zealand) Alice Robinson	23	135	492	0	650
13	(Croatia) Zrinka Ljutić	0	0	239	321	560
14	(Norway) Kajsa Vickhoff Lie	162	337	45	0	544
15	(Austria) Mirjam Puchner	251	278	0	0	529
16	(Germany) Lena Dürr	0	0	9	508	517
17	(United States) Paula Moltzan	0	0	236	237	473
18	(Austria) Katharina Liensberger	0	0	122	325	447
19	(Canada) Valérie Grenier	60	42	327	0	429
20	(Switzerland) Camille Rast	0	0	122	290	412
21	(Sweden) Anna Swenn-Larsson	0	0	0	395	395
22	(Germany) Kira Weidle	163	221	0	0	384
23	(Czech Republic) Ester Ledecká	87	287	0	0	374
24	(Norway) Mina Fürst Holtmann	0	0	193	179	372
25	(Norway) Thea Louise Stjernesund	0	0	307	62	369
26	(Switzerland) Jasmine Flury	275	92	0	0	367
27	(Italy) Laura Pirovano	216	149	0	0	365
28	(Austria) Ariane Rädler	211	151	0	0	362
29	(Slovenia) Ilka Štuhec	242	60	0	0	302
30	(France) Laura Gauché	161	132	0	0	293
31	(Austria) Katharina Huber	0	0	0	272	272
32	(United States) AJ Hurt	0	0	202	66	268
33	(Austria) Franziska Gritsch	0	30	161	72	263
34	(France) Romane Miradoli	47	215	0	0	262
35	(Canada) Ali Nullmeyer	0	0	0	246	246
36	(Austria) Christina Ager	148	78	0	0	226
	(Austria) Julia Scheib	0	0	226	0	226
38	(Switzerland) Mélanie Meillard	0	0	37	187	224
39	(Switzerland) Joana Hählen	125	94	0	0	219
40	(Italy) Nicol Delago	198	20	0	0	218
41	(Austria) Katharina Truppe	0	0	15	200	215
42	(Slovenia) Neja Dvornik	0	0	55	159	214
43	(United States) Lauren Macuga	42	168	0	0	210
44	(Switzerland) Priska Nufer	148	56	0	0	204
45	(Albania) Lara Colturi	0	0	115	86	201
46	(France) Clara Direz	0	0	198	0	198
47	(United States) Jacqueline Wiles	184	10	0	0	194
48	(Germany) Emma Aicher	55	52	31	53	191
49	(Austria) Stephanie Brunner	0	8	176	3	187
50	(Croatia) Leona Popović	0	0	0	183	183
51	(Italy) Roberta Melesi	7	98	63	0	168
52	(Slovenia) Ana Bucik	0	0	85	79	164
53	(Austria) Katharina Gallhuber	0	0	0	162	162
54	(Bosnia and Herzegovina) Elvedina Muzaferija	69	82	0	0	151
55	(Switzerland) Corinne Suter	53	96	0	0	149
56	(Latvia) Dženifera Ģērmane	0	0	0	145	145
57	(Switzerland) Wendy Holdener	0	0	21	114	135
58	(Poland) Maryna Gasienica-Daniel	0	30	95	0	125
59	(Austria) Ricarda Haaser	6	27	90	0	123
60	(Italy) Martina Peterlini	0	0	0	116	116
61	(Slovenia) Andreja Slokar	0	0	0	114	114
62	(Czech Republic) Martina Dubovská	0	0	0	113	113
63	(France) Chiara Pogneaux	0	0	0	110	110
64	(Switzerland) Delia Durrer	57	48	0	0	105
65	(Norway) Kristin Lysdahl	0	0	36	51	87
66	(Canada) Britt Richardson	0	0	85	0	85
	(Switzerland) Jasmina Suter	4	70	11	0	85
68	(Canada) Laurence St. Germain	0	0	0	84	84
69	(Italy) Teresa Runggaldier	50	32	0	0	82
70	(Switzerland) Nicole Good	0	0	0	79	79
	(United States) Isabella Wright	51	28	0	0	79
72	(Austria) Christine Scheyer	50	24	0	0	74
73	(Italy) Marta Rossetti	0	0	0	67	67
74	(Canada) Amelia Smart	0	0	0	64	64
75	(Austria) Elizabeth Kappaurer	0	0	63	0	63
76	(France) Marie Lamure	0	0	0	60	60
	(Italy) Elisa Platino	0	0	60	0	60
	(Switzerland) Simone Wild	0	0	60	0	60
79	(Poland) Magdalena Luczak	0	0	52	0	52
	(Sweden) Cornelia Öhlund	0	0	0	52	52
81	(Italy) Lara Della Mea	0	0	7	37	44
	(France) Karen Smadja-Clément	11	33	0	0	44
83	(Sweden) Estelle Alphand	0	0	16	27	43
84	(Austria) Michaela Heider	0	42	0	0	42
	(Italy) Asja Zenere	0	0	42	0	42
86	(Sweden) Hanna Aronsson Elfman	0	0	0	40	40
87	(France) Marion Chevrier	0	0	0	39	39
	(Italy) Nadia Delago	36	3	0	0	39
89	(Switzerland) Stephanie Jenal	14	22	0	0	36
90	(Canada) Cassidy Gray	0	2	33	0	35
91	(Switzerland) Elena Stoffel	0	0	0	34	34
92	(Austria) Marie-Therese Sporer	0	0	0	33	33
	(Norway) Bianca Bakke Westhoff	0	0	0	33	33
94	(Switzerland) Noémie Kolly	13	15	0	0	28
95	(Austria) Lena Wechner	3	24	0	0	27
96	(Norway) Andrine Mårstøl	0	0	0	26	26
97	(Austria) Sabrina Maier	20	4	0	0	24
	(Norway) Maria Therese Tviberg	0	0	0	24	24
99	(France) Camille Cerutti	0	23	0	0	23
100	(Sweden) Lisa Nyberg	0	0	22	0	22
101	(France) Clarisse Brèche	0	0	0	21	21
	(Austria) Nadine Fest	2	19	0	0	21
103	(United States) Tricia Mangan	3	17	0	0	20
104	(United States) Keely Cashman	12	7	0	0	19
	(Austria) Michelle Niederwieser	17	2	0	0	19
106	(Italy) Vicky Bernardi	3	13	0	0	16
	(Germany) Jessica Hilzinger	0	0	0	16	16
108	(Sweden) Lisa Hörnblad	1	13	0	0	14
109	(France) Caitlin McFarlane	0	0	8	5	13
	(Italy) Vera Tschurtschenthaler	0	0	0	13	13
111	(Sweden) Hilma Lövblom	0	0	12	0	12
112	(Austria) Lisa Hörhager	0	0	0	10	10
	(Italy) Lucrezia Lorenzi	0	0	0	10	10
	(Austria) Emily Schöpf	10	0	0	0	10
115	(Czech Republic) Adriana Jelinkova	0	0	9	0	9
116	(Canada) Stefanie Fleckenstein	7	0	0	0	7
117	(Australia) Madison Hoffman	0	0	0	6	6
	(Norway) Marte Monsen	0	0	6	0	6
	(Switzerland) Juliana Suter	1	5	0	0	6
120	(Japan) Asa Ando	0	0	0	4	4
	(United States) Lila Lapanja	0	0	0	4	4
122	(Austria) Elisabeth Reisinger	0	3	0	0	3
123	(Liechtenstein) Charlotte Lingg	0	0	0	2	2
124	(Finland) Erika Pykalainen	0	0	1	0	1
	(Italy) Sara Thaler	0	1	0	0	1

- Leader
- 2nd place
- 3rd place
- did not compete in this discipline
- Updated on 23 March 2024, after all events.

== See also ==
- 2024 Alpine Skiing World Cup – Women's summary rankings
- 2024 Alpine Skiing World Cup – Women's downhill
- 2024 Alpine Skiing World Cup – Women's super-G
- 2024 Alpine Skiing World Cup – Women's giant slalom
- 2024 Alpine Skiing World Cup – Women's slalom
- 2024 Alpine Skiing World Cup – Men's overall
- World Cup scoring system
