= Cassidy Gray =

Canadian alpine skier (born 2001)

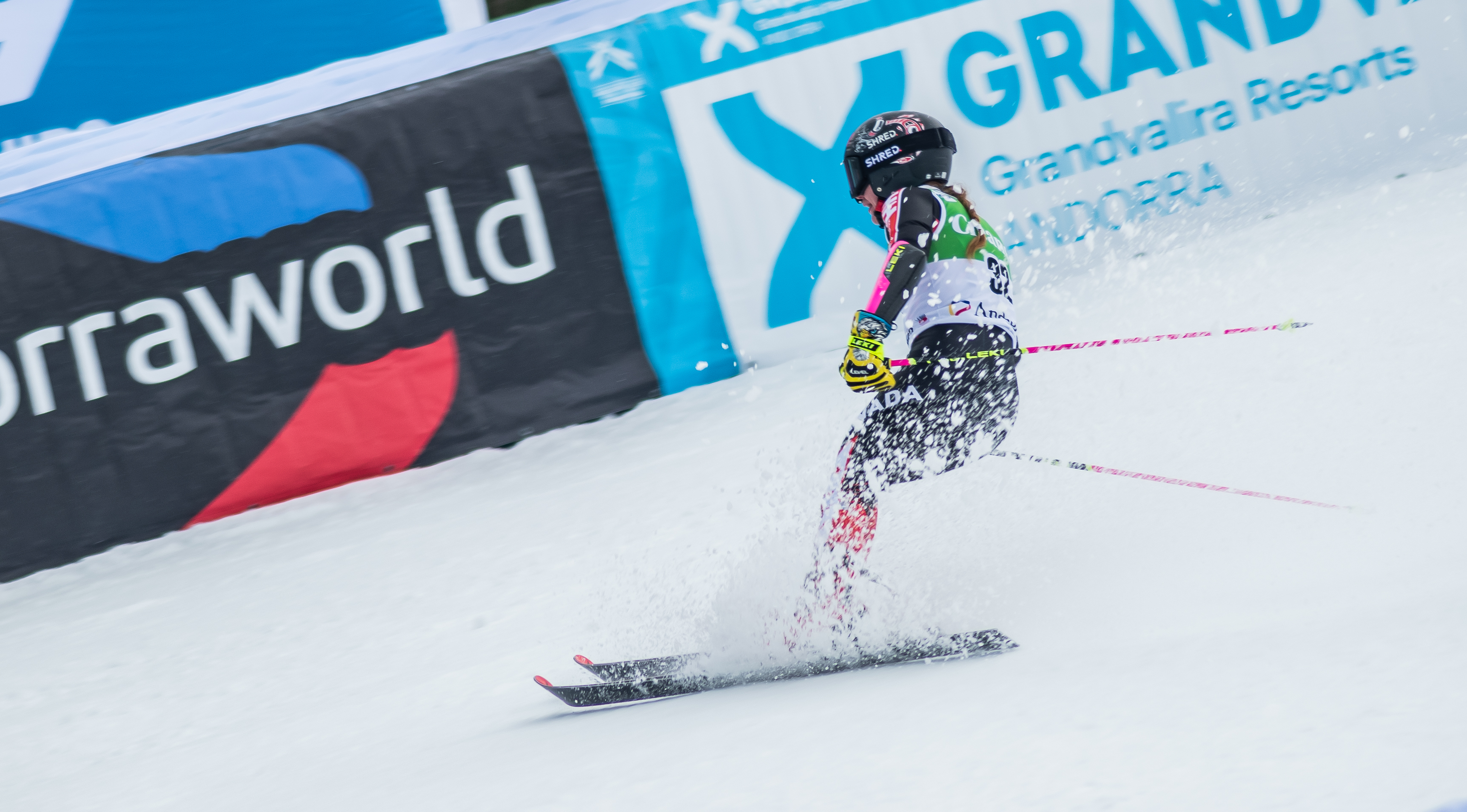
- Gray in 2024

Personal information
- Born: 25 January 2001 (age 25) Invermere, British Columbia, Canada

Skiing career
- Country: Canada
- Sport: Alpine skiing
- Club: PANO
- Disciplines: Giant slalom, super-G, downhill
- World Cup debut: 16 January 2021 (age 19)

Olympics
- Teams: 2 – (2022, 2026)
- Medals: 0

World Championships
- Teams: 2 – (2021, 2025)
- Medals: 0

World Cup
- Seasons: 6 – (2021–2026)
- Podiums: 0
- Overall titles: 0 – (90th in 2024)
- Discipline titles: 0 – (38th in GS, 2024)
Medal record
World Junior Championships
| Gold medal – first place | 2022 Panorama | Team parallel |

Cassidy Gray (born 25 January 2001) is a Canadian alpine skier. She competed in the 2022 and 2026 Olympics.

== Career ==
Gray has been part of the national team since 2021.

Gray made her World Cup debut in January 2021 with a 26th-place finish in the giant slalom event at the Kranjska Gora stop. At Gray's first World Championships in 2021, Gray finished in 23rd in the giant slalom event.

Gray designed a helmet with a Shuswap artist to honour first nations people while racing.

On 21 January 2022, Gray was named to Canada's 2022 Olympic team.

== World Cup results ==
=== Season standings ===
Season
| Season | Age | Overall | Slalom | Giant slalom | Super-G | Downhill |
| 2021 | 20 | 114 | — | 52 | — | — |
| 2022 | 21 | No World Cup points earned | | | | |
| 2023 | 22 | No World Cup points earned | | | | |
| 2024 | 23 | 90 | — | 38 | 57 | — |
| 2025 | 24 | 104 | — | 46 | — | — |
| 2026 | 25 | 83 | — | 34 | — | — |

Standings through 31 January 2026

== World Championships results ==
Year
| Year | Age | Slalom | Giant slalom | Super-G | Downhill | Combined | Team combined | Parallel | Team event |
| 2021 | 20 | — | 23 | — | — | — | —N/a | DNQ | 7 |
| 2025 | 24 | — | DNF1 | 20 | 25 | —N/a | 19 | —N/a | — |

== Olympic results ==
Year
| Year | Age | Slalom | Giant slalom | Super-G | Downhill | Combined | Team combined | Team event |
| 2022 | 21 | — | DNF1 | — | — | — | —N/a | 9 |
| 2026 | 25 | — | DNF1 | DNF | — | —N/a | DSQ2 | —N/a |
