= Ricarda Haaser =

Austrian alpine skier (born 1993)

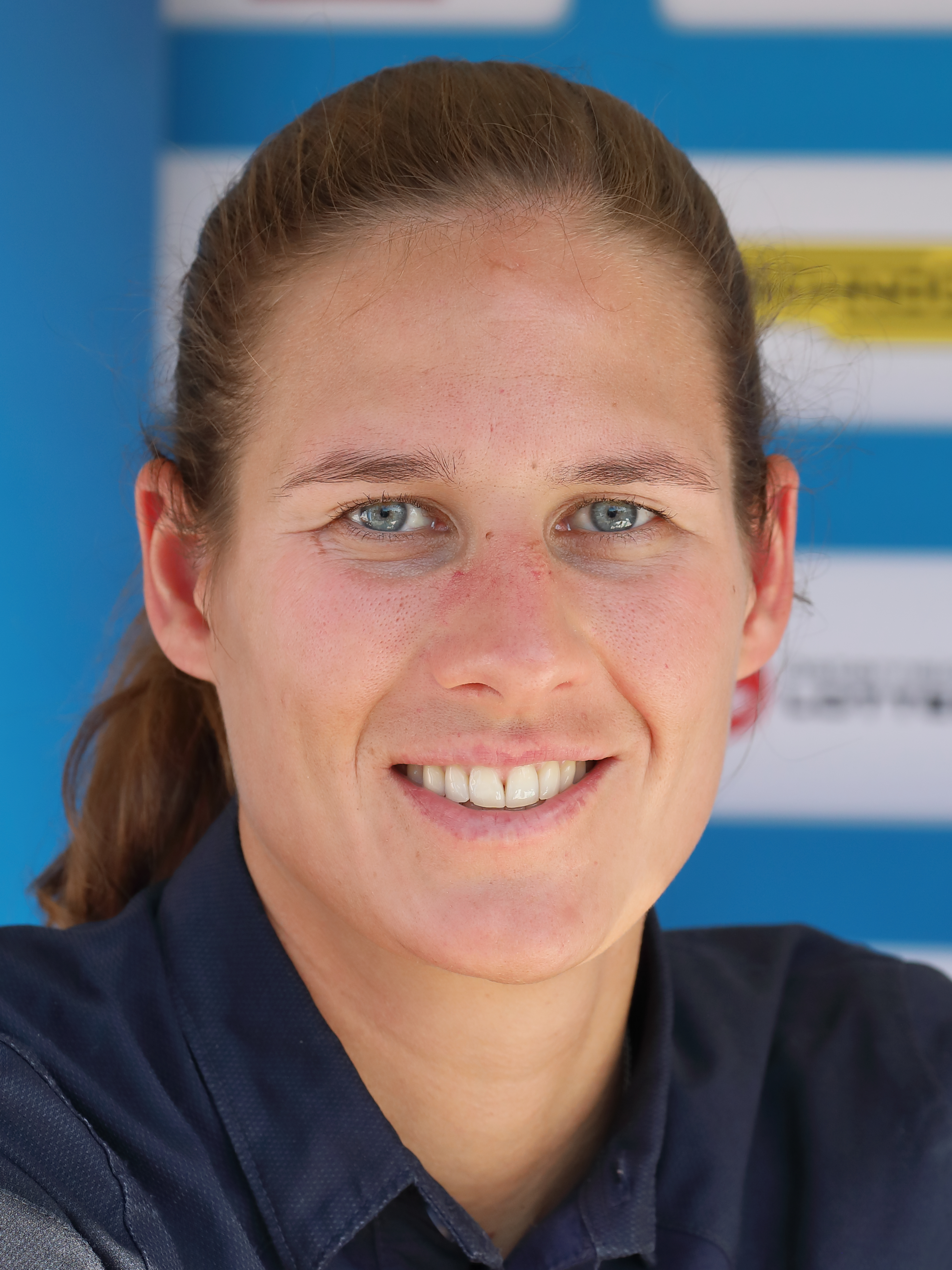
- Ricarda Haaser in September 2024

Personal information
- Born: 10 September 1993 (age 32) Innsbruck, Austria
- Height: 1.73 m (5 ft 8 in)

Skiing career
- Country: Austria
- Sport: Alpine skiing ♀
- Club: SV Achensee - Tirol
- Disciplines: Giant slalom, super-G, combined
- World Cup debut: 16 November 2013 (age 20)

Olympics
- Teams: 1 – (2018)
- Medals: 0

World Championships
- Teams: 3 – (2017, 2019, 2023)
- Medals: 1 (0 gold)

World Cup
- Seasons: 13 – (2014–2026)
- Podiums: 0
- Overall titles: 0 – (24th in 2019)
- Discipline titles: 0 – (10th in GS, 2019)
Medal record
Women's alpine skiing
Representing Austria
International alpine ski competitions
Event	1st	2nd	3rd
World Championships	0	0	1
Total	0	0	1
World Championships
Bronze medal – third place	2023 Méribel	Combined

Ricarda Haaser (born 10 September 1993) is an Austrian alpine ski racer who competed at the 2018 Winter Olympics.

At the World Championships in 2023, she took the bronze medal in the combined; her younger brother Raphael won the bronze in the men's combined the next day.

== World Cup results ==
=== Season standings ===
Season
Season	Age	Overall	Slalom	Giant slalom	Super-G	Downhill	Combined	Parallel
2016	22	80	—	49	46	—	19	—N/a
2017	23	31	33	27	18	35	14	—N/a
2018	24	31	30	14	27	—	18	—N/a
2019	25	24	—	10	41	20	12	—N/a
2020	26	64	—	30	38	41	23	—
2021	27	31	—	23	15	28	—N/a	30
2022	28	48	—	15	38	49	—N/a	—
2023	29	48	—	15	40	—	—N/a	—N/a
2024	30	59	—	24	38	45	—N/a	—N/a
2025	31	35	—	23	20	27	—N/a	—N/a
2026	32	72	—	37	36	35	—N/a	—N/a

=== Top five finishes ===
- 0 podiums, 6 top fives, 24 top tens

Season
Season	Date	Location	Discipline	Place
2017	26 February 2017	Crans-Montana, Switzerland	Combined	5th
2018	20 December 2017	Courchevel, France	Parallel slalom	5th
2018	9 March 2018	Ofterschwang, Germany	Giant slalom	4th
2022	11 March 2022	Åre, Sweden	Giant slalom	5th
2025	14 December 2024	Beaver Creek, United States	Downhill	5th
2025	19 January 2025	Cortina d'Ampezzo, Italy	Super-G	5th

== World Championship results ==
Year
Year	Age	Slalom	Giant slalom	Super-G	Downhill	Combined	Team event
2017	23	—	—	—	—	9	—
2019	25	—	15	—	—	DNF2	—
2023	29	—	DNF1	—	—	3	

== Olympic results ==
Year
Year	Age	Slalom	Giant slalom	Super-G	Downhill	Combined	Team event
2018	24	—	17	—	—	13	—
