= 2025 Alpine Skiing World Cup – Women's giant slalom =

Alpine ski discipline year standings

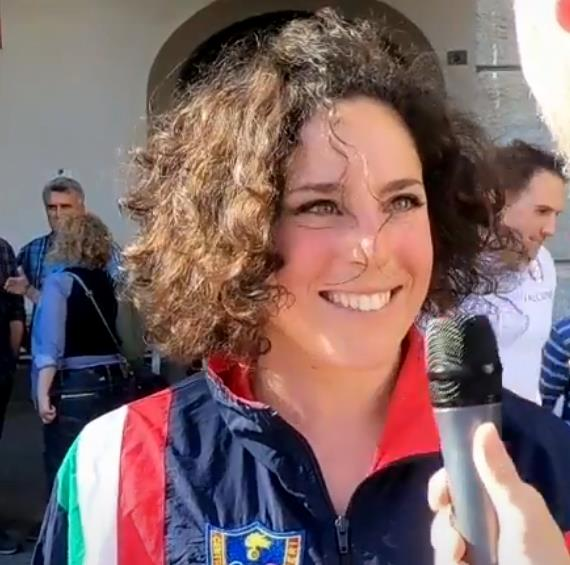
2025 Women's Giant Slalom World Cup: Federica Brignone of Italy, discipline champion for the second time; 2025 Women's World Cup; Overall • Downhill • Super-G; Giant slalom • Slalom
| Previous: 2024 | Next: 2026 |

The women's giant slalom in the 2025 FIS Alpine Skiing World Cup consisted of nine events, including the final. The discipline originally contained ten events, but two were cancelled in Canada in December and only one of them was able to be rescheduled, as discussed below. As it does every year, the season opened in Sölden, Austria on 26 October 2024. Defending champion Lara Gut-Behrami of Switzerland returned but found several challengers, including 2020 discipline champion Federica Brignone of Italy, Sweden's Sara Hector, and Alice Robinson of New Zealand. Ultimately, Brignone placed second at finals to move past Robinson for her second crystal globe in this discipline, five years after her first.

The season was interrupted for the FIS Alpine World Ski Championships 2025, this time in Saalbach, Austria during 4–16 February 2025. The championship in women's giant slalom took place on Thursday, 13 February and was dominated by Brignone, who won by almost a second over Robinson, who in turn was over a second and a half ahead of bronze medalist Paula Moltzan of the U.S.

== Season summary ==
The first giant slalom of the season, scheduled as usual on the Rettenbach glacier in Sölden, Austria in October, was won by 2024 discipline runner-up (and 2020 discipline champion) Federica Brignone, who rallied from third place after the opening run with the seventh-fastest time in the second run to overtake both of the racers ahead of her. With the victory, Brignone, who is 34, became the oldest woman ever to win a World Cup race, surpassing Elizabeth Görgl of Austria, who won her last race on the World Cup circuit in December 2014 at 33, two months before turning 34. Because this was the first race of the season, neither defending champion Lara Gut-Behrami of Switzerland nor perennial contender Petra Vlhová of Slovakia had recovered from prior-season surgeries sufficiently to be able to compete, although Gut-Behrami entered the race but did not start. Before the end of November, the third and fourth giant slaloms of the season, scheduled at Tremblant, Quebec, Canada, were cancelled due to lack of snow, pending rescheduling.

Immediately thereafter, in the second giant slalom of the year at Mikaela Shiffrin's "home" course in Killington, Vermont, United States, Shiffrin was trying for her 100th World Cup victory, having won number 99 in her last race. As in Sölden, she held the lead going into the second run. However, while still in the lead shortly after the midpoint of the course, she suffered a hard crash into the fencing, which resulted in her being stretchered off the course; the crash handed the win to Sara Hector of Sweden, who thus took over the overall lead in the discipline for the season. After the cancellations (which still had not been rescheduled as of the end of December), the next giant slalom, held after Christmas in Semmering (Austria), came down to a second-run battle between Brignone and Gut-Behrami, which was decided when Gut-Behrami hooked a gate with her arm, causing her to drop all the way to ninth and handing the victory to Brignone, who edged ahead of Hector by 4 points in the season standings.

The first giant slalom of 2025 took place in Kranjska Gora, Slovenia, just after New Years Day, and Hector was able to win again and reclaim the season lead after Brignone fell during her first run, with New Zealand's Alice Robinson moving into a tie with Brignone for second. During the next week, one of the giant slaloms cancelled at Tremblant in December 2024 was awarded to Sestriere on 21 February, the day prior to the giant slalom already scheduled there. And still in Italy, Alice Robinson of New Zealand won the giant slalom held at Kronplatz, in a race where Hector, Brignone and Goggia all failed to finish, and she edged out Hector by four points for the season lead in the discipline.

At the world championships, Shiffrin (the winningest skier in women's World Cup history in the giant slalom, with 22 victories) decided that she still had not recovered mentally from the crash in Killington and chose not to defend her 2023 world championship in the discipline. In her absence, Brignone and Robinson dominated the race, with Brignone posting the fastest and Robinson (the first Alpine skiing world medalist from New Zealand) the second-fastest time in each heat,. After the worlds, in the first of two races in Sestriere, Italy, Brignone and Robinson repeated their success at worlds, with Brignone, who had been sick with the flu since worlds, prevailing by four-tenths of a second, with the rest of the field over a second behind Robinson. The next day, Brignone dominated again, winning her fourth GS of the season to move into second, just 40 points behind Robinson with only two races remaining, while a still-recovering Shiffrin missed qualifying for the second run for the first time in 12 years (since October 2012 at Sölden). Next, in Åre, Sweden, the giant slalom was once again won by Brignone for her third straight win in the discipline (fourth straight, counting worlds), with Robinson once again second, decreasing Robinson's lead to just 20 points (520 to 500) with only the finals remaining.

== Finals ==
The World Cup final in the discipline was held on Tuesday, 25 March in Sun Valley, Idaho, United States. Only the top 25 skiers in the World Cup giant slalom discipline and the winner of the Junior World Championship in the discipline (Giorgia Collomb of Italy), plus any skiers who have scored at least 500 points in the World Cup overall classification for the season, are eligible to compete in the final, and only the top 15 earn World Cup points. Only Robinson and Brignone were still in contention for the discipline's season title. Four skiers with 500+ overall points who were not otherwise eligible (Kajsa Vickhoff Lie of Norway, Katharina Liensberger of Austria, Emma Aicher of Germany, and Lauren Macuga of the United States) entered the race through points, while one eligible skier (Ricarda Haaser of Austria) missed the race due to injury, leaving a starting field of 29 (including Collomb). Robinson failed to finish the first run, so all Brignore needed to do to win the discipline championship was finish in the top 12; however, she posted the fastest time in the second run and finished second behind Gut-Behrami (who had previously won the super-G during finals) in the race, easily clinching the crystal globe.

== Standings ==
| | Venue | 26 Oct 2024; Sölden | 30 Nov 2024; Killington | 7 Dec 2024; Tremblant | 8 Dec 2024; Tremblant | 28 Dec 2024; Semmering | 4 Jan 2025; Kranjska Gora | 21 Jan 2025; Kronplatz | 13 Feb 2025; Saalbach WC | 21 Feb 2025; Sestriere R# | 22 Feb 2025; Sestriere | 8 Mar 2025; Åre | 25 Mar 2025; Sun Valley | |
| # | Skier | (Austria) | (United States) | (Canada) | (Canada) | (Austria) | (Slovenia) | (Italy) | (Austria) | (Italy) | (Italy) | (Sweden) | (United States) | Total |
| | (Italy) Federica Brignone | 100 | DNF2 | xx | | 100 | DNF1 | DNF2 | ① | 100 | 100 | 100 | 80 | 580 |
| 2 | (New Zealand) Alice Robinson | 80 | DNF1 | xx | | 60 | 60 | 100 | ② | 80 | 60 | 80 | DNF1 | 520 |
| 3 | (Sweden) Sara Hector | 16 | 100 | xx | | 80 | 100 | DNF2 | ⑥ | 45 | 20 | 26 | 60 | 447 |
| 4 | (Norway) Thea Louise Stjernesund | 40 | 50 | xx | | 26 | 36 | 40 | ④ | 60 | 29 | 50 | 50 | 381 |
| 5 | (Albania) Lara Colturi | 15 | 29 | xx | | 24 | 80 | 50 | ⑦ | 36 | 40 | 60 | 45 | 379 |
| 6 | (Switzerland) Lara Gut-Behrami | DNS | 20 | xx | | 29 | 40 | 80 | ⑤ | DNF1 | 80 | 29 | 100 | 378 |
| 7 | (United States) Paula Moltzan | 24 | 45 | xx | | 45 | DNQ | 60 | ③ | 40 | 32 | 40 | DNF1 | 286 |
| 8 | (Croatia) Zrinka Ljutić | 13 | 80 | xx | | 32 | 22 | 45 | ⑧ | 50 | 22 | 11 | DNF1 | 275 |
| 9 | (Austria) Julia Scheib | 60 | DNF1 | xx | | 40 | 50 | DNF1 | DNF2 | 29 | 45 | 36 | DNS | 260 |
| 10 | (Switzerland) Camille Rast | 22 | 60 | xx | | 14 | 32 | 29 | ⑪ | 29 | 26 | 32 | DNF2 | 244 |
| 11 | (United States) Nina O'Brien | 36 | 40 | xx | | 16 | 24 | 26 | ⑲ | 32 | DNF2 | 24 | 22 | 220 |
| 12 | (Canada) Valérie Grenier | DNS | 29 | xx | | 50 | DNQ | 32 | ⑭ | 18 | DNF2 | 45 | DNF1 | 174 |
| 13 | (Slovenia) Neja Dvornik | DNQ | 36 | xx | | 15 | 32 | 15 | ㉑ | 5 | 11 | 10 | 40 | 164 |
| 14 | (United States) AJ Hurt | DNS | | xx | | 4 | 26 | 20 | ⑬ | 22 | 36 | 12 | 32 | 152 |
| 15 | (Switzerland) Wendy Holdener | 6 | 22 | xx | | 10 | 13 | 16 | ㉕ | 11 | 14 | 15 | 36 | 143 |
| 16 | (Norway) Mina Fürst Holtmann | 29 | DNF1 | xx | | 12 | DNQ | 11 | ⑰ | 7 | 24 | 20 | 24 | 127 |
| 17 | (Italy) Sofia Goggia | DNS | | xx | | DNS | 45 | DNF1 | DNF1 | 20 | 50 | DSQ2 | DNF2 | 115 |
| 18 | (Poland) Maryna Gąsienica-Daniel | 6 | 24 | xx | | 20 | DNQ | 13 | ⑮ | 10 | 12 | 8 | 20 | 113 |
| 19 | (Sweden) Estelle Alphand | 8 | 16 | xx | | 6 | 15 | DNQ | ⑳ | 13 | 10 | 13 | 29 | 110 |
| 20 | (Austria) Stephanie Brunner | 18 | DNF1 | xx | | DNF1 | 14 | 18 | ⑱ | 14 | 18 | DNF2 | 26 | 108 |
| 21 | (Canada) Britt Richardson | 14 | 4 | xx | | 8 | DNF1 | 36 | ⑩ | 24 | DNF2 | 16 | DSQ1 | 102 |
| 22 | (United States) Katie Hensien | 50 | 20 | xx | | 3 | 4 | 10 | ㉒ | 10 | DNF1 | DNF1 | DSQ1 | 97 |
| 23 | (Austria) Ricarda Haaser | DNF2 | 32 | xx | | 22 | 18 | 12 | DNS | | | | | 84 |
| 24 | (Slovenia) Ana Bucik Jogan | 10 | 14 | xx | | 20 | 10 | 6 | ㉔ | 15 | 7 | DNQ | 0 | 82 |
| 25 | (Germany) Lena Dürr | 26 | DNQ | xx | | 9 | 6 | 9 | ⑨ | DNS | 16 | 9 | 0 | 75 |
| 26 | (Italy) Marta Bassino | 20 | DNQ | xx | | 36 | DNQ | DNS1 | DNF1 | 13 | DNF2 | DSQ1 | NE | 69 |
| 27 | (Norway) Kajsa Vickhoff Lie | DNS | | xx | | 13 | 16 | 24 | ⑯ | DNF1 | 9 | DNS | DNF1 | 62 |
| 28 | (Sweden) Lisa Nyberg | DNQ | DNQ | xx | | DNQ | 20 | DNQ | ㉙ | DNQ | 15 | 22 | NE | 57 |
| 29 | (Austria) Katharina Liensberger | 32 | DNF1 | xx | | DNQ | DNQ | DNS | ⑫ | 16 | 6 | DNQ | DSQ1 | 54 |
| 30 | (United States) Mikaela Shiffrin | 45 | DNF2 | xx | | DNS | | | | 6 | DNQ | DNF1 | NE | 51 |
| 31 | (Italy) Asja Zenere | 11 | 13 | xx | | DNQ | 9 | 7 | DNS | 8 | DNQ | DNF1 | NE | 48 |
| 32 | (Italy) Lara Della Mea | DNS | 5 | xx | | DNQ | 12 | 24 | DNS2 | DNQ | DNQ | DNF1 | NE | 41 |
| 33 | (United States) Elisabeth Bocock | DNS | 8 | xx | | DNF1 | DNF1 | DNS | | DNF2 | 8 | 18 | NE | 34 |
| 34 | (Italy) Giorgia Collomb | DNQ | 12 | xx | | DNQ | DNQ | DNQ | DNS | DNQ | DNF1 | DNS | 18 | 30 |
| 35 | (Italy) Ilaria Ghisalberti | DNQ | 10 | xx | | 0 | 8 | 8 | DNS | DNQ | DNQ | DNQ | NE | 26 |
| | (Norway) Madeleine Sylvester-Davik | DNS | | xx | | DNQ | 11 | DNQ | DNF1 | DNQ | DNF1 | 15 | NE | 26 |
| 37 | (France) Clara Direz | 12 | DNF2 | xx | | 5 | DNQ | 3 | DNF2 | 5 | DNF1 | DNF1 | NE | 25 |
| | (Austria) Franziska Gritsch | 4 | DNQ | xx | | 2 | DNQ | 14 | DNS | DNQ | DNQ | 5 | NE | 25 |
| 39 | (Switzerland) Michelle Gisin | 9 | 7 | xx | | DNS | 5 | DNQ | ㉖ | DNS | | | NE | 20 |
| | (Switzerland) Vanessa Kasper | DNS | DNF1 | xx | | DNQ | DNQ | 4 | DNS | 3 | 13 | DNQ | NE | 20 |
| 41 | (Germany) Emma Aicher | DNQ | 12 | xx | | DNF2 | 7 | DNQ | ㉓ | DNQ | DNS | DNQ | DNF2 | 19 |
| | (Switzerland) Simone Wild | 3 | 9 | xx | | 7 | DNQ | DNQ | DNS | | | | NE | 19 |
| 43 | (United States) Lauren Macuga | DNS | | | | | | | | | | | 16 | 16 |
| 44 | (France) Clarisse Brèche | DNS | 15 | xx | | DNQ | DNQ | DNQ | DNF1 | DNS | | | NE | 15 |
| 45 | (Norway) Kristin Lysdahl | DNQ | 7 | xx | | DNF1 | DNS | | | DNQ | DNQ | 7 | NE | 14 |
| 46 | (Canada) Cassidy Gray | DNF2 | DNQ | xx | | 11 | DNQ | DNQ | DNF1 | DNF1 | DNQ | DNF2 | NE | 11 |
| 47 | (Germany) Fabiana Dorigo | 7 | DNQ | xx | | DNQ | DNQ | DNF1 | ㉛ | DNF1 | DNQ | DNQ | NE | 7 |
| | (Italy) Roberta Melesi | DNQ | DNQ | xx | | DNQ | 3 | DNQ | DNS | DNF1 | DNS | 4 | NE | 7 |
| 49 | (Sweden) Hilma Lövblom | DNQ | DNF1 | xx | | DNQ | DNQ | DNF1 | DNS | DNQ | DNQ | 6 | NE | 6 |
| 50 | (Poland) Magdalena Luczak | DNS | DNF1 | xx | | DNQ | DNQ | 5 | ㉗ | DNS | | | NE | 5 |
| | (France) Doriane Escané | DNS | | | | | | DNQ | DNS | DNQ | 5 | DNQ | NE | 5 |
| 52 | (Austria) Victoria Olivier | DNS | | xx | | DNQ | 2 | DNQ | DNS | | | | NE | 2 |
| 53 | (Argentina) Francesca Baruzzi Farriol | DNQ | DNQ | xx | | DNQ | 1 | DNQ | DNF2 | DNQ | DNQ | DNQ | NE | 1 |
| | References | | | | | | | | | | | | | |

=== Legend ===
- Winner (100 points)
- 2nd place (80 points)
- 3rd place (60 points)
- DNQ = Did not qualify for run 2
- DNF1 = Did not finish run 1
- DSQ1 = Disqualified run 1
- DNF2 = Did not finish run 2
- DSQ2 = Disqualified run 2
- DNS2 = Did not start run 2
- Did not start (DNS)
- Not eligible for finals (NE)
- Race canceled (x)
- FIS non-World Cup race (World Championships)
- R# = Rescheduled (make-up) race
- Updated at 25 March 2025, after all events.

== See also ==
- 2025 Alpine Skiing World Cup – Women's summary rankings
- 2025 Alpine Skiing World Cup – Women's overall
- 2025 Alpine Skiing World Cup – Women's downhill
- 2025 Alpine Skiing World Cup – Women's super-G
- 2025 Alpine Skiing World Cup – Women's slalom
- World Cup scoring system
