= 2024 Alpine Skiing World Cup – Women's super-G =

Alpine ski discipline year standings

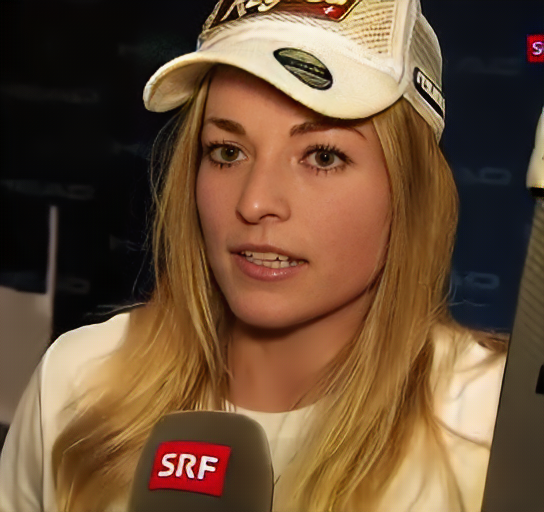
2024 Women's Super-G World Cup: Lara Gut-Behrami of Switzerland, discipline champion for the fifth time; 2024 Women's World Cup; Overall • Downhill • Super-G; Giant slalom • Slalom
Previous: 2023	Next: 2025

The women's super-G in the 2024 FIS Alpine Skiing World Cup consisted of nine events, including the final. One super-G on 10 December in St. Moritz was canceled, but it was rescheduled as a second super-G in Zauchensee on 12 January. As discussed in the season summary below, three more cancellations took place during February, reducing the season to eight races, but one downhill was then converted to a super-G to produce the final total of nine.

== Season summary ==
The first event in this discipline, which did not take place until 8 December 2023 in St. Moritz, Switzerland, was easily won by three-time defending downhill champion Sofia Goggia, who triumphed by almost a second over the field. The follow-up race on the same slope was canceled due to continuing heavy snowfall.

In the next event, 2022 discipline champion Federica Brignone of Italy notched her third victory of the season in a race that only 32 of the 57 starters were actually able to complete, a result that kept Goggia in first place for the season. However, the two races after that, both in the Austrian resort of Altenmarkt-Zauchensee in mid-January, were won first by Cornelia Hütter of Austria and then by four-time (2014, '16, '21, '23) discipline champion Lara Gut-Behrami of Switzerland (her 20th career win in the discipline, placing her second all-time among women), with Hütter second, moving Hütter and Gut-Behrami into the top two positions in the discipline for the season.

Two weeks later in Cortina d'Ampezzo, Gut-Behrami won her second straight super-G (her sixth win at Cortina -- and her 41st victory overall), and, when Hütter failed to finish, Gut-Behrami grabbed the season lead in the discipline by just 10 points, but with Brignone and Goggia also still within 85 points of the lead. However, the super-G scheduled for the first week of February in Garmisch-Partenkirchen was then cancelled due to warm weather. However, even the time off didn't affect the proliferation of injuries, with Goggia requiring immediate surgery after breaking two bones in her right leg while doing giant slalom training in Italy, putting her on the sidelines for the rest of the season, while 2019 discipline champion Mikaela Shiffrin was still out after her crash in Cortina.

The last month of the season contained four super-Gs before the finals. In the first, in Crans Montana, Switzerland, downhill specialist Stephanie Venier of Austria, who had finished second behind Gut-Behrami at Cortina, upset the field to record her first super-G win, with Brignone second, Hütter fifth, and Gut-Behrami sixth, reducing Gut-Behrami's lead over Hütter to just five points, and also moving Brignone within 34 and Venier within 94 in the discipline. However, heavy snowfall in Val di Fassa, Italy prompted cancellation of both super-Gs scheduled there at the end of February, leaving only two races in the season. But, when the next-to-last downhill of the season, in Kvitfjell, had both planned training runs, on 29 February and 1 March, cancelled by heavy snowfall, the downhill could not be run (as at least one training run prior to the race is required); instead, the race was converted to a super-G to replace one of the canceled races in that discipline, creating back-to-back super Gs on 2 and 3 March. Gut-Behrami won the first race and was second the next day behind Brignone in a race delayed repeatedly by fog, allowing Gut-Behrami to open a 69-point lead over Hütter and a 74-point lead over Brignone, with just the finals remaining.

== Finals ==
The World Cup final was held Friday, 22 March 2023 in Saalbach, Austria. Only the top 25 skiers in the World Cup Super-G discipline and the winner of the Junior World Championship in the discipline, plus any skiers who have scored at least 500 points in the World Cup overall classification for the season, were eligible to compete in the final, and only the top 15 earned World Cup points. However, shortly after winning the Junior World Championship, 20-year-old Swiss skier Malorie Blanc required season-ending surgery to repair a tear of her anterior cruciate ligament, forcing her to join past discipline champions Corinne Suter and Shiffrin, plus Goggia and fellow Swiss speed skiers Joana Hählen and Jasmine Flury, on the sidelines for the final. Also, no 500-point skiers who were not otherwise eligible chose to compete, leaving the race with a field of 21 starters.

Because of her huge lead going into the final, all Gut-Behrami needed to do was place no worse than 8th to clinch the season crown, and she actually placed seventh, thus winning her fifth super-G season title to tie Katja Seizinger and her former rival Lindsey Vonn for most titles in the discipline; meanwhile, versatile Czech snowboarder and Alpine skier Ester Ledecká won the race, her first Alpine win since missing the entire 2022-23 Alpine season due to injury.

== Standings ==
	Venue	8 Dec 2023; St. Moritz	10 Dec 2023; St. Moritz	17 Dec 2023; Val d'Isère	12 Jan 2024; Zauchensee	14 Jan 2024; Zauchensee	28 Jan 2024; Cortina d'Ampezzo	4 Feb 2024; Garmisch	18 Feb 2024; Crans Montana	24 Feb 2024; Val di Fassa	25 Feb 2024; Val di Fassa	2 Mar 2024; Kvitfjell	3 Mar 2024; Kvitfjell	22 Mar 2024; Saalbach	
#	Skier	(Switzerland)	(Switzerland)	(France)	(Austria)	(Austria)	(Italy)	(Germany)	(Switzerland)	(Italy)	(Italy)	(Norway)	(Norway)	(Austria)	Total
	(Switzerland) Lara Gut-Behrami	60	x	DNF	60	100	100	x	40	x		100	80	36	576
2	(Italy) Federica Brignone	45	x	100	50	22	29	x	80	x		40	100	80	546
3	(Austria) Cornelia Hütter	80	x	50	100	80	DNF	x	45	x		80	36	45	516
4	(Austria) Stephanie Venier	40	x	DNS	32	14	80	x	100	x		24	40	50	380
5	(Norway) Kajsa Vickhoff Lie	13	x	80	80	18	DNF	x	36	x		DNF	50	60	337
6	(Czech Republic) Ester Ledecká	8	x	DNF	13	24	DNS	x	32	x		50	60	100	287
7	(Austria) Mirjam Puchner	26	x	20	36	60	36	x	20	x		60	4	16	278
8	(Norway) Ragnhild Mowinckel	29	x	22	16	50	50	x	DNF	x		22	26	32	247
9	(Italy) Marta Bassino	36	x	DNF	45	2	40	x	60	x		16	16	29	244
10	(Italy) Sofia Goggia	100	x	60	DNF	32	45	x	DNS						237
11	(Germany) Kira Weidle	5	x	29	18	0	26	x	29	x		50	24	40	221
12	(France) Romane Miradoli	DNS	x	13	5	29	60	x	50	x		14	22	22	215
13	(United States) Lauren Macuga	1	x	14	0	26	16	x	12	x		36	45	18	168
14	(Switzerland) Michelle Gisin	11	x	45	16	45	DNS	x	8	x		0	18	20	163
15	(Austria) Ariane Rädler	16	x	15	40	0	DNF	x	22	x		DNF	32	26	151
16	(Italy) Laura Pirovano	15	x	36	7	12	22	x	24	x		0	9	24	149
17	(New Zealand) Alice Robinson	24	x	DNF	6	10	32	x	16	x		18	29	0	135
18	(France) Laura Gauché	22	x	DNF	12	36	24	x	26	x		12	DNF	DNF	132
19	(Italy) Roberta Melesi	2	x	10	2	40	DNF	x	20	x		11	13	0	98
20	(Switzerland) Corinne Suter	32	x	24	20	20	DNS								96
21	(Switzerland) Joana Hählen	20	x	40	29	5	DNS								94
22	(Switzerland) Jasmine Flury	14	x	32	26	DNF	20	x	DNS						92
23	(Bosnia and Herzegovina) Elvedina Muzaferija	DNF	x	0	0	DNF	18	x	15	x		29	20	DNF	82
24	(Austria) Christina Ager	12	x	18	9	0	9	x	3	x		26	1	0	78
25	(Switzerland) Jasmina Suter	0	x	9	3	15	12	x	10	x		6	15	0	70
26	(Slovenia) Ilka Štuhec	0	x	16	0	0	DNF	x	0	x		32	12	NE	60
27	(Switzerland) Priska Nufer	5	x	6	14	7	8	x	6	x		2	8	NE	56
28	(Germany) Emma Aicher	DNF	x	26	DNF	0	DNS	x	4	x		8	14	NE	52
29	(United States) Mikaela Shiffrin	50	x	DNF	DNS										50
30	(Switzerland) Delia Durrer	10	x	DNF	0	11	6	x	DSQ	x		10	11	NE	48
31	(Canada) Valérie Grenier	18	x	DNF	24	DNF	DNF	DNS						NE	42
	(Austria) Michaela Heider	DSQ	x	11	9	6	DNS	x	13	x		3	DNF	NE	42
33	(France) Karen Smadja-Clément	0	x	DNF	0	0	7	x	11	x		15	DNF	NE	33
34	(Italy) Teresa Runggaldier	0	x	7	0	0	DNF	x	0	x		20	5	NE	32
35	(Austria) Franziska Gritsch	DNF	x	DNS	4	16	DNS	x	DNF	x		DSQ	10	NE	30
	(Poland) Maryna Gąsienica-Daniel	9	x	DNF	11	0	DNS	x	DNF	x		7	3	NE	30
37	(United States) Isabella Wright	DNF	x	DNF	1	0	0	x	14	x		13	DNF	NE	28
38	(Austria) Ricarda Haaser	DNS	x	DNS		DNF	14	x	7	x		DNF	6	NE	27
39	(Austria) Christine Scheyer	DNF	x	2	DNS	13	4	x	5	x		DNF	0	NE	24
	(Austria) Lena Wechner	DNS	x	13	DNF	4	DNF	x	0	x		4	3	NE	24
41	(France) Camille Cerutti	0	x	3	0	9	10	x	1	x		0	0	NE	23
42	(Switzerland) Stephanie Jenal	DNS	x	DNS	22	0	DNF	x	DNF	x		0	0	NE	22
43	(Italy) Nicol Delago	0	x	1	0	3	11	x	0	x		5	0	NE	20
44	(Austria) Nadine Fest	6	x	DNF	DNF	DNS	1	x	3	x		9	0	NE	19
45	(United States) Tricia Mangan	0	x	DNF	DNF	DNF	DNF	x	10	x		0	7	NE	17
46	(Switzerland) Noémie Kolly	DNS	x	DNS			15	x	DNF	x		0	DNS	NE	15
47	(Italy) Vicky Bernardi	DNS	x	DNS		0	13	x	DNF	x		DNS		NE	13
	(Sweden) Lisa Hörnblad	DNF	x	0	0	8	5	x	DNF	x		DNF	DNS	NE	13
49	(United States) Jacqueline Wiles	DNS	x	DNF	10	DNF	0	x	0	x		0	0	NE	10
50	(Austria) Stephanie Brunner	DNS	x	8	0	DNS		x	DNS					NE	8
51	(United States) Keely Cashman	7	x	DNF	0	0	0	x	DNS	x		0	DNS	NE	7
52	(Switzerland) Juliana Suter	DNF	x	5	DNS									NE	5
53	(Austria) Sabrina Maier	DNF	x	4	0	DNF	DNS	x	0	DNS		DNF	DNS	NE	4
54	(Italy) Nadia Delago	0	x	DNF	0	DNF	3	x	0	x		DNF	DNS	NE	3
	(Austria) Elisabeth Reisinger	3	x	DNS				x	DNS					NE	3
56	(Canada) Cassidy Gray	DNF	x	DNS		DNF	2	x	DNS	x	DNS			NE	2
	(Austria) Michelle Niederwieser	0	x	DNF	0	2	DNS	x	DNS					NE	2
58	(Italy) Sara Thaler	DNS	x	DNS								1	DNS	NE	1
	References														

=== Legend ===
- Winner (100 points)
- 2nd place (80 points)
- 3rd place (60 points)
- DNF = Did not finish
- DSQ = Disqualified
- Did not start (DNS)
- Not eligible for finals (NE)
- Race canceled (x)
- Updated at 22 March 2024, after all events.

== See also ==
- 2024 Alpine Skiing World Cup – Women's summary rankings
- 2024 Alpine Skiing World Cup – Women's overall
- 2024 Alpine Skiing World Cup – Women's downhill
- 2024 Alpine Skiing World Cup – Women's giant slalom
- 2024 Alpine Skiing World Cup – Women's slalom
- World Cup scoring system
