= 2023 Alpine Skiing World Cup – Women's giant slalom =

Alpine ski discipline year standings

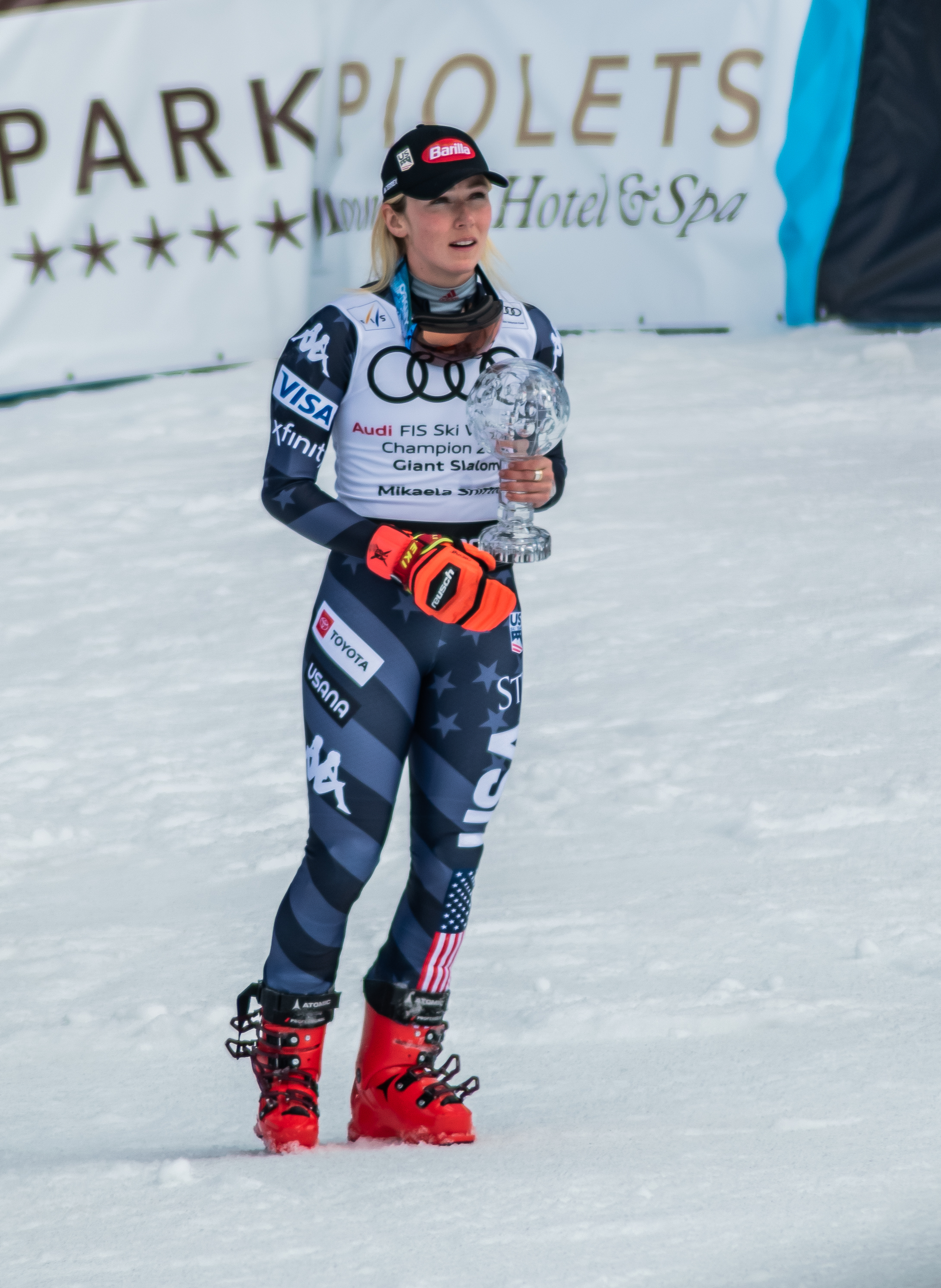
2023 Women's Giant slalom World Cup: Mikaela Shiffrin of the United States, season champion; 2023 Women's World Cup; Overall • Downhill • Super-G; Giant slalom • Slalom
Previous: 2022	Next: 2024

The women's giant slalom in the 2023 FIS Alpine Skiing World Cup included ten events, including the final. The season was scheduled to open in Sölden, Austria on 22 October 2022, but the race was cancelled due to bad weather and rescheduled to Semmering, Austria on 27 December.

The season was interrupted by the 2023 World Ski Championships in the linked resorts of Courchevel and Méribel, France from 6–19 February 2023. Although the Alpine skiing branch of the International Ski Federation (FIS) conducts both the World Cup and the World Championships, the World Championships are organized by nation (a maximum of four skiers is generally permitted per nation), and (after 1970) the results count only for World Championship medals, not for World Cup points. Accordingly, the results in the World Championship are highlighted in blue and shown in this table by ordinal position only in each discipline. The women's giant slalom was held in Méribel on 16 February.

== Season summary ==
After six races, 2021 discipline champion Marta Bassino of Italy, who had podiumed in five of them (one win, two seconds, and two thirds), held a slim lead over 2019 discipline champion Mikaela Shiffrin of the United States, who had three wins, in the season standings. However, Shiffrin's victory in the seventh race (her fourth win) not only propelled her into the discipline lead for the season but also broke Lindsey Vonn's all-time women's record for World Cup victories, as it was Shiffrin's 83rd overall win. Shiffrin's later victory in Åre, Sweden (her sixth giant slalom win of the season) gave her the season championship with one race remaining and also enabled her to tie two records: Ingemar Stenmark's all-time overall record of 86 World Cup wins, and Vreni Schneider's all-time women's record of 20 giant slalom victories.

Shiffrin then broke Schneider's women's record for giant slalom victories by winning the finals, her seventh World Cup victory in the discipline for the season and her 21st career victory in the discipline (but still trailing Stenmark, who had 46, as well as three other men: Marcel Hirscher (31), Ted Ligety (24), and Michael von Grünigen (23)). Also, Switzerland's Lara Gut-Behrami, who finished fourth, moved past Bassino, who finished sixth, into second place in the discipline for the season.

The World Cup finals took place on Sunday, 19 March 2023 in Soldeu, Andorra, which previously hosted the finals in 2019. Only the top 25 skiers in the World Cup giant slalom discipline and the winner of the Junior World Championship, plus any skiers who have scored at least 500 points in the World Cup overall classification for the season, were eligible to compete in the final, and only the top 15 earned World Cup points.

== Standings ==
	Venue	26 Nov 2022; Killington	10 Dec 2022; Sestriere	27 Dec 2022; Semmering	28 Dec 2022; Semmering	7 Jan 2023; Kranjska Gora	8 Jan 2023; Kranjska Gora	24 Jan 2023; Kronplatz	25 Jan 2023; Kronplatz	16 Feb 2023; Méribel WC	10 Mar 2023; Åre	19 Mar 2023; Soldeu	
#	Skier	(United States)	(Italy)	(Austria)	(Austria)	(Slovenia)	(Slovenia)	(Italy)	(Italy)	(France)	(Sweden)	(Andorra)	Total
	(United States) Mikaela Shiffrin	20	40	100	100	40	100	100	100	①	100	100	800
2	(Switzerland) Lara Gut-Behrami	100	36	36	80	45	60	80	45	④	DNF1	50	532
3	(Italy) Marta Bassino	80	100	60	60	80	45	26	DNF2	⑤	24	40	515
4	(Slovakia) Petra Vlhová	50	60	80	36	60	50	50	50	⑦	50	DNF1	486
5	(Italy) Federica Brignone	29	50	45	50	50	80	60	32	②	80	DNF1	476
6	(Sweden) Sara Hector	60	80	32	DSQ2	29	32	40	60	⑬	60	DNF1	393
7	(Canada) Valérie Grenier	DNF1	22	DSQ1	45	100	40	29	18	⑳	40	60	354
8	(France) Tessa Worley	36	45	50	26	4	13	45	40	DNF2	45	24	328
9	(Norway) Ragnhild Mowinckel	40	29	40	22	15	14	24	80	③	18	29	311
10	(Norway) Thea Louise Stjernesund	26	10	16	6	24	11	15	16	⑧	32	80	236
11	(United States) Paula Moltzan	13	32	26	29	12	29	DNF2	36	DNF1	16	16	209
12	(New Zealand) Alice Robinson	18	15	29	DNF1	12	DNF2	32	29	⑮	36	36	207
13	(Poland) Maryna Gąsienica-Daniel	32	DNF1	DNF1	40	20	10	36	DNF1	⑩	29	32	199
14	(Slovenia) Ana Bucik	DNF2	20	18	18	32	26	18	DNF1	㉕	14	0	146
15	(Austria) Ricarda Haaser	16	12	14	32	18	DNF1	11	15	DNF1	DNS	20	138
16	(Norway) Mina Fürst Holtmann	DNF1	DNF1	5	20	26	36	DNF2	4	⑥	DNF1	45	136
17	(Switzerland) Wendy Holdener	15	26	8	16	16	8	DNS		⑱	22	18	129
18	(Austria) Franziska Gritsch	11	14	7	9	22	16	10	9	⑫	DNF2	22	120
19	(France) Coralie Frasse Sombet	DNF1	16	24	14	40	DNQ	7	DNQ	⑨	DNF2	0	101
20	(Austria) Katharina Liensberger	45	4	20	12	10	DNQ	DNQ	3	㉔	DNQ	0	94
	(Norway) Maria Therese Tviberg	DNQ	DNF2	6	24	14	24	DNF1	DNF2	⑲	DNF1	26	94
22	(Switzerland) Andrea Ellenberger	12	11	11	15	6	22	5	11	DNF1	DNQ	0	93
23	(Austria) Stephanie Brunner	DNS	DNF2	13	11	13	18	DNF2	DNQ	DNS	29	0	84
24	(Austria) Julia Scheib	DNS		DNQ	DNQ	DNF1	20	22	24	DNF2	13	DNF1	79
25	(Sweden) Estelle Alphand	5	8	DNF1	DNS	DNQ	5	20	13	㉖	20	0	71
26	(United States) Nina O'Brien	8	DNQ	DNF1	DNQ	DNF1	6	13	26	⑪	15	DNF1	68
27	(Austria) Ramona Siebenhofer	22	14	10	DSQ1	2	DNQ	8	DNQ	DNS	8	NE	64
28	(Switzerland) Michelle Gisin	6	7	22	5	DNF2	3	9	DNQ	㉘	9	0	61
29	(Austria) Elisabeth Kappaurer	DNF1	18	DNF1	13	DNQ	DNQ	16	8	DNS	5	NE	60
30	(Albania) Lara Colturi	14	DNQ	DNF1	11	DNQ	DNQ	14	14	DNS		NE	53
31	(Switzerland) Camille Rast	10	9	4	4	7	9	DNQ	5	⑭	DNQ	NE	48
32	(Italy) Asja Zenere	DNS	24	DNQ	7	3	DNQ	DNQ	12	㉒	DNS	NE	46
33	(Switzerland) Simone Wild	3	5	12	8	DNQ	4	DNF1	10	DNS	DNQ	NE	42
34	(Italy) Roberta Melesi	24	3	DNQ	DNQ	DNF1	DNQ	DNQ	DNF1	DNS	11	NE	38
35	(Austria) Katharina Truppe	9	6	15	DNF2	DNQ	DNQ	DNQ	DNQ	DNS	7	NE	37
36	(Italy) Elisa Platino	DNS	DNQ	DNQ	DNQ	8	15	DNQ	DNQ	DNS	12	NE	35
37	(Sweden) Hilma Lövblom	DNS	DNQ	DNF1	DNF1	DNQ	DNQ	DNQ	20	DNF1	6	NE	26
38	(Slovenia) Neja Dvornik	DNQ	DNQ	DNF1	DNS	DNQ	DNQ	DNQ	22	㉗	DNQ	NE	22
	(Austria) Elisa Mörzinger	DNQ	DNQ	3	DNQ	DNQ	DNQ	12	7	DNS	DNF1	NE	22
40	(France) Clara Direz	DNF2	DNF1	9	DNQ	9	DNQ	DNQ	DNQ	⑯	DNF1	NE	18
	(Croatia) Zrinka Ljutić	DNQ	DNS	DNQ	DNQ	DNF1	12	DNF2	6	⑰	DNF2	NE	18
42	(Sweden) Lisa Nyberg	DNQ	DNQ	DNQ	DNQ	DNQ	DNQ	6	DNQ	DNS	10	NE	16
43	(Austria) Katharina Huber	7	DNQ	1	DNF1	DNQ	DNQ	DNS				NE	8
44	(Canada) Britt Richardson	DNQ	DNS	DNQ	DNQ	DNQ	7	DNF1	DNQ	㉑	DNS	NE	7
45	(Austria) Nina Astner	DNQ	DNQ	DNQ	DNQ	5	DNQ	DNQ	DNQ	DNS	DNQ	NE	5
46	(United States) Katie Hensien	4	DNF1	DNF1	DNQ	DNQ	DNQ	DNQ	DNQ	㉓	DNQ	NE	4
47	(France) Romane Miradoli	DNS	DNQ	3	DNS					DNF2	DNS	NE	3
	(Switzerland) Corinne Suter	DNS		DNQ	3	DNS						NE	3
49	(Slovenia) Tina Robnik	DNS		DNQ	DNF1	DNQ	2	DNQ	DNQ	DNS		NE	2
	References												

=== Legend ===
- Winner (100 points)
- 2nd place (80 points)
- 3rd place (60 points)
- DNQ = Did not qualify for run 2
- DNF1 = Did Not Finish run 1
- DSQ1 = Disqualified run 1
- DNF2 = Did Not Finish run 2
- DSQ2 = Disqualified run 2
- DNS2 = Did not start run 2
- Did not start (DNS)
- Not Eligible for finals (NE)
- Race canceled (x)
- FIS non-World Cup race (World Championships)
- Updated at 19 March 2023, after all events.

== See also ==
- 2023 Alpine Skiing World Cup – Women's summary rankings
- 2023 Alpine Skiing World Cup – Women's overall
- 2023 Alpine Skiing World Cup – Women's downhill
- 2023 Alpine Skiing World Cup – Women's super-G
- 2023 Alpine Skiing World Cup – Women's slalom
- World Cup scoring system
