= 2024 Alpine Skiing World Cup – Women's downhill =

Alpine ski discipline year standings

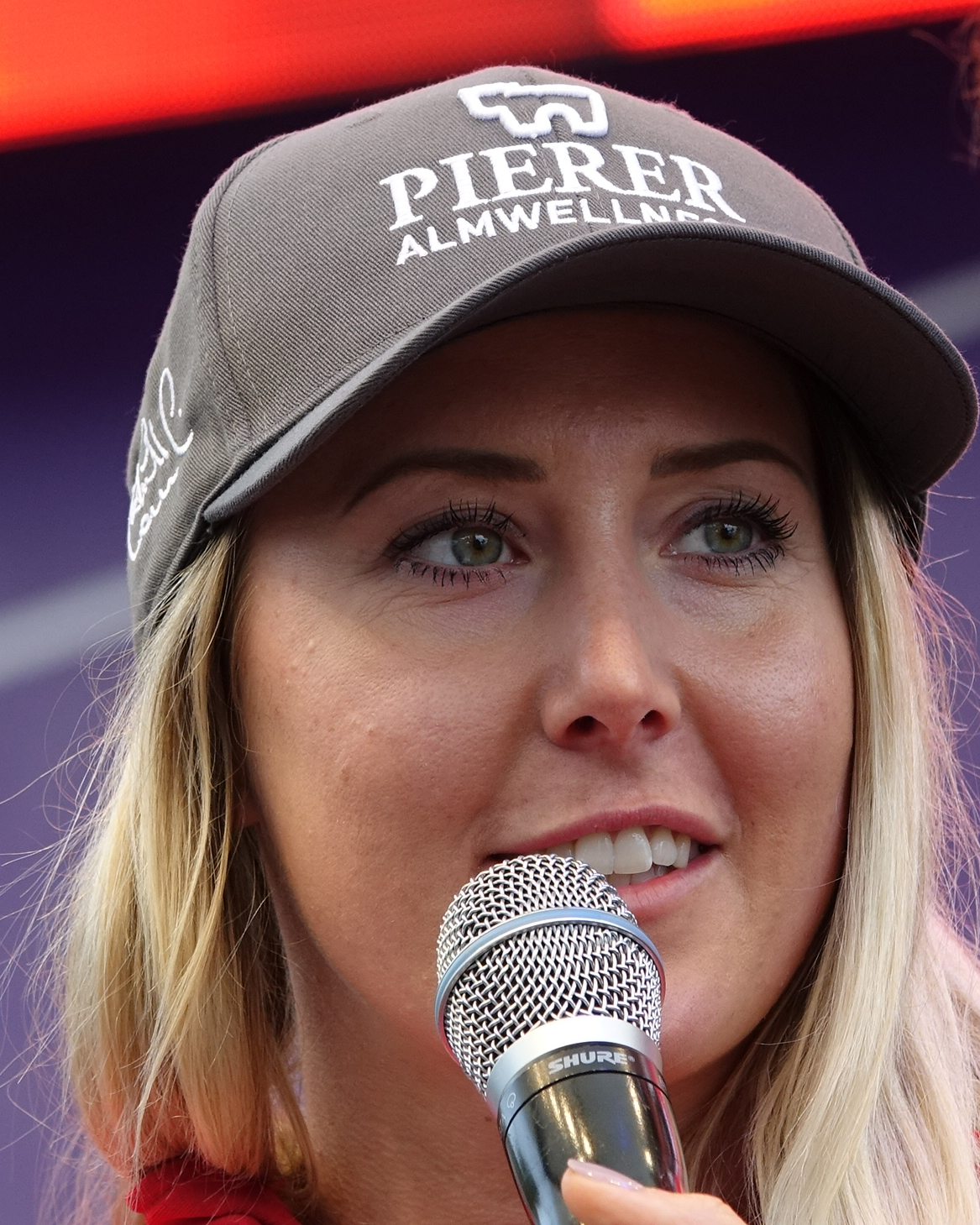
2024 Women's Downhill World Cup: Cornelia "Conny" Hütter of Austria, season champion; 2024 Women's World Cup; Overall • Downhill • Super-G; Giant slalom • Slalom
Previous: 2023	Next: 2025

The women's downhill in the 2024 FIS Alpine Skiing World Cup consisted of eight events, including the final. The tentative schedule called for eleven events, but a new event, the team combined, which was scheduled for 16 February 2024 in Crans Montana, was cancelled and converted into an additional downhill on the final schedule, increasing the planned schedule to twelve. However, as discussed below in the season summary, cancellations reduced that number during the season. The season champion was Cornelia Hütter of Austria, ending a string of three straight season triumphs by Sofia Goggia of Italy, who was injured just after the midpoint of the season but still finished third.

== Season summary ==
The first two downhills of the season were scheduled for 18 and 19 November 2023 on the "Gran Becca" course on the Matterhorn, which crosses an international border between the start (Zermatt, in Switzerland) and the finish (Cervinia, in Italy); the course name comes from the local dialect in Valtournenche, in which the Matterhorn is called “Gran Becca”, meaning “big peak”. However, the first downhill of the season was cancelled due to high winds on the Matterhorn, and its rescheduling or replacement was not planned. The scheduled race the next day also was cancelled due to high winds, and its rescheduling or replacement was also not planned, thus reducing the season to ten events.

As a result, the first downhill was held in St. Moritz, Switzerland on 9 December, and visibility deteriorated so badly during the break after the first 30 skiers that the remainder of the race was canceled after 35 skiers; three of the five after the break failed to finish. However, the race was official since the 30 skiers had already gone, and it resulted in an upset victory for two-time defending overall champion Mikaela Shiffrin of the U.S. (only her fourth downhill win of her all-time record 91 total victories). However, Shiffrin only competed in one of the next four downhills, in Cortina, in which she crashed and was injured, and those four downhills were won by four different skiers from four different countries: Jasmine Flury of Switzerland; three-time defending discipline champion Sofia Goggia of Italy; Stephanie Venier of Austria; and Ragnhild Mowinckel of Norway. The wide distribution of results left Goggia in the overall lead at the halfway point of the season, with an 89-point lead over Venier with four races to go.

The following downhill, scheduled for the first week of February in Garmisch-Partenkirchen, Germany, was then cancelled due to warm weather, giving the many injured skiers on the World Cup circuit another week to recover. However, even the time off didn't affect the proliferation of injuries, with discipline leader Goggia requiring immediate surgery after breaking two bones in her right leg while doing giant slalom training in Italy, putting her on the sidelines for the rest of the season along with Swiss skiers Joana Hählen and Corinne Suter and Canadian skier Valérie Grenier, while Shiffrin also was still out after her crash in Cortina. In the first race back after Goggia's injury, at Crans Montana in Switzerland, Swiss star Lara Gut-Behrami became the sixth different winner in six races for the season, and her victory moved her to within 41 points of Goggia's season lead. and three other racers -- Venier, Flury, and Cornelia Hütter of Austria -- closed to within 100 points. The next day, a seventh different winner, Marta Bassino of Italy, took advantage of an early start time on a melting course to claim the top step of the podium ahead of Brignone and Gut-Behrami; however, Gut-Behrami took over the season lead in the discipline (with just two races to go), giving her the current lead in three of the four disciplines as well as the overall lead.

The next-to-last downhill of the season, in Kvitfjell, was scheduled for 2 March, but both planned training runs, on 29 February and 1 March, were cancelled by heavy snowfall, which meant the downhill could not be run (as at least one training run prior to the race is required); instead, the race was converted to a super-G to replace one of the two races in that discipline cancelled the prior week.

== Finals ==
The World Cup finals in women's downhill were held on Saturday, 23 March 2024 in Saalbach-Hinterglemm, Austria. For the first time since the finals began in 1993, the downhill was the last event of the finals instead of the first, with the women's race being held on Saturday and the men's on Sunday. Only the top 25 skiers in the World Cup downhill discipline and the winner of the Junior World Championship in the discipline (Victoria Olivier of Austria), plus any skiers who had scored at least 500 points in the World Cup overall classification for the season, were eligible to compete in the discipline final, and only the top 15 earned World Cup points. Due to injuries, six qualified skiers (Goggia, Shiffrin, Flury, Hählen, Grenier, and Laura Gauché of France) missed the finals, and one non-qualified skier with 500 points (Alice Robinson) opted to compete, so the final consisted of 21 racers.

Gut-Behrami carried a lead of 68 points over Venier and 72 points over Hütter into the final, so she only needed to tie for eighth (worth 32 points) to clinch the season title. Hütter, skiing twelfth, moved into first by half a second, but Gut-Behrami, skiing just two racers later, played it too safe and was almost two seconds behind (which was not in the top 15), giving Hütter only the second downhill win of her career (about six-and-one-half years after her first, at Lake Louise in 2017) and the discipline crown for the season.

== Standings ==
	Venue	18 Nov 2023; Zermatt/Cervinia	19 Nov 2023; Zermatt/Cervinia	9 Dec 2023; St. Moritz	16 Dec 2023; Val d'Isère	13 Jan 2024; Zauchensee	26 Jan 2024; Cortina d'Ampezzo	27 Jan 2024; Cortina d'Ampezzo	3 Feb 2024; Garmisch	16 Feb 2024; Crans Montana	17 Feb 2024; Crans Montana	2 Mar 2024; Kvitfjell	23 Mar 2024; Saalbach	
#	Skier	(Switzerland) (Italy)	(Switzerland) (Italy)	(Switzerland)	(France)	(Austria)	(Italy)	(Italy)	(Germany)	(Switzerland)	(Switzerland)	(Norway)	(Austria)	Total
	(Austria) Cornelia Hütter	x		50	60	15	32	36	x	80	24	x	100	397
2	(Switzerland) Lara Gut-Behrami	x		20	24	40	80	45	x	100	60	x	0	369
3	(Italy) Sofia Goggia	x		80	50	100	60	60	x	DNS				350
4	(Austria) Stephanie Venier	x		36	DNS	80	100	45	x	26	14	x	45	346
5	(Italy) Federica Brignone	x		60	32	18	DNF	22	x	40	80	x	29	281
6	(Switzerland) Jasmine Flury	x		13	100	24	22	24	x	80	12	x	DNS	275
7	(Austria) Mirjam Puchner	x		45	26	60	29	20	x	16	15	x	40	251
8	(Slovenia) Ilka Štuhec	x		18	45	22	10	12	x	29	26	x	80	242
9	(Italy) Marta Bassino	x		26	12	0	24	29	x	45	100	x	0	236
10	(Italy) Laura Pirovano	x		7	14	20	40	18	x	50	45	x	22	216
11	(Austria) Ariane Rädler	x		15	36	36	11	15	x	32	40	x	26	211
12	(Norway) Ragnhild Mowinckel	x		2	18	6	16	100	x	22	36	x	0	200
13	(Italy) Nicol Delago	x		11	11	60	12	13	x	15	16	x	60	198
14	(United States) Jacqueline Wiles	x		DNS	6	18	20	80	x	20	20	x	20	184
15	(Germany) Kira Weidle	x		29	20	45	15	DNF	x	9	13	x	32	163
16	(Norway) Kajsa Vickhoff Lie	x		16	22	DNF	36	32	x	24	32	x	0	162
17	(France) Laura Gauché	x		8	9	29	18	50	x	18	29	x	DNS	161
18	(Austria) Christina Ager	x		10	3	6	60	14	x	0	5	x	50	148
	(Switzerland) Priska Nufer	x		14	40	26	DNF	16	x	36	0	x	16	148
20	(Switzerland) Joana Hählen	x		6	80	13	26	DNF	DNS					125
21	(Switzerland) Michelle Gisin	x		32	11	32	DNF	DNS	x	5	0	x	36	116
22	(United States) Mikaela Shiffrin	x		100	DNS		DNF	DNS						100
23	(Czech Republic) Ester Ledecká	x		9	15	7	DNS	DNF	x	14	18	x	24	87
24	(Bosnia and Herzegovina) Elvedina Muzaferija	x		DNF	0	0	0	6	x	13	50	x	0	69
25	(Canada) Valérie Grenier	x		DNS			60	DNF	DNS					60
26	(Switzerland) Delia Durrer	x		12	16	12	2	10	x	3	2	x	NE	57
27	(Germany) Emma Aicher	x		40	7	DNF	DNF	DNS	x	8	DNF	x	NE	55
28	(Switzerland) Corinne Suter	x		24	29	DNF	DNF	DNS					NE	53
29	(United States) Isabella Wright	x		22	2	14	13	DNF	x	DNF	DNF	x	NE	51
30	(Italy) Teresa Runggaldier	x		DNS	0	0	5	11	x	10	24	x	NE	50
	(Austria) Christine Scheyer	x		4	13	11	9	DNF	x	2	11	x	NE	50
32	(France) Romane Miradoli	x		DNS		0	0	26	x	12	9	x	NE	47
33	(United States) Lauren Macuga	x		DNS	0	0	15	8	x	11	8	x	NE	42
34	(Italy) Nadia Delago	x		5	5	9	8	9	x	0	0	x	NE	36
35	(New Zealand) Alice Robinson	x		DNS	0	DNS			x	1	4	x	18	23
36	(Austria) Sabrina Maier	x		0	0	10	DNF	DNS	x	6	4	x	NE	20
37	(Austria) Michelle Niederwieser	x		DNS	8	8	1	DNF	x	DNS		x	NE	17
38	(Switzerland) Stephanie Jenal	x		DNS		4	DNF	3	x	0	7	x	NE	14
39	(Switzerland) Noémie Kolly	x		DNS		DNF	DNS		x	7	6	x	NE	13
40	(United States) Keely Cashman	x		DNS	1	0	4	7	x	DNS		x	NE	12
41	(France) Karen Clément	x		DNS	0	DNF	0	6	x	4	1	x	NE	11
42	(Austria) Emily Schöpf	x		DNS	0	0	DNS		x	0	10	x	NE	10
43	(Canada) Stefanie Fleckenstein	x		3	4	DNS						x	NE	7
	(Italy) Roberta Melesi	x		DNS			7	DNS	x	0	DNS	x	NE	7
45	(Austria) Ricarda Haaser	x		DNS			6	DNS	x	0	0	x	NE	6
46	(Switzerland) Jasmina Suter	x		DNS	0	DNS	0	4	x	0	0	x	NE	4
47	(Italy) Vicky Bernardi	x		DNS		3	DNS		x	0	0	x	NE	3
	(United States) Tricia Mangan	x		DNS	DNF	DNF	3	0	x	DNF	0	x	NE	3
	(Austria) Lena Wechner	x		DNS	0	2	DNF	1	x	DNS	0	x	NE	3
50	(Austria) Nadine Fest	x		DNF	0	DNS	DNF	2	x	0	0	x	NE	2
51	(Sweden) Lisa Hörnblad	x		DNS	0	1	DNF	0	x	0	0	x	NE	1
	(Switzerland) Juliana Suter	x		1	DNS								NE	1
	References													

=== Legend ===
- Winner (100 points)
- 2nd place (80 points)
- 3rd place (60 points)
- DNF = Did not finish
- DSQ = Disqualified
- Did not start (DNS)
- Not eligible for finals (NE)
- Race canceled (x)
- Updated on 23 March 2024, after all events.

== See also ==
- 2024 Alpine Skiing World Cup – Women's summary rankings
- 2024 Alpine Skiing World Cup – Women's overall
- 2024 Alpine Skiing World Cup – Women's super-G
- 2024 Alpine Skiing World Cup – Women's giant slalom
- 2024 Alpine Skiing World Cup – Women's slalom
- World Cup scoring system
