= Katie Hensien =

American alpine skier (born 1999)

Personal information
- Born: December 1, 1999 (age 26) Redmond, Washington
- Height: 5 ft 4 in (163 cm)

Skiing career
- Sport: Alpine skiing ♀
- Club: Rowmark Ski Academy
- Disciplines: Slalom, Giant slalom
- World Cup debut: November 26, 2017

Olympics
- Teams: 1 – (2022)

World Championships
- Teams: 3 – (2021, 2023, 2025)
- Medals: 1 (1 gold)

World Cup
- Seasons: 9 – (2018–2023, 2025–2026)
Medal record
Women's alpine skiing
Representing the United States
World Championships
Gold medal – first place	2023 Méribel	Team event

Katie Hensien (born December 1, 1999) is an American alpine ski racer specializing in giant slalom, super-G, and downhill.

== Biography ==
Hensien is from Redmond, Washington, and grew up skiing at Crystal Mountain. In 2014, her family moved to Park City, Utah so that she could pursue skiing at Rowland Hall.

Hensien attended the University of Denver, where she was a member of the Denver Pioneers ski team. In 2022, she was named the National Women's Alpine Skier of the Year by the United State Collegiate Ski Coaches Association.

Hensien has raced with the United States Ski Team at the FIS Alpine World Ski Championships since 2021. At the 2023 World Championships in Courchevel and Méribel, she won gold as a member of the mixed parallel team.

At the 2022 Winter Olympics, Hensien finished twenty sixth in the slalom.

Hensien qualified for the 2026 Winter Olympics. However, in November, 2025, she suffered a fractured tibia while training in Levi, Finland which caused her to withdraw from the competition.
