= AJ Hurt =

American alpine skier (born 2000)

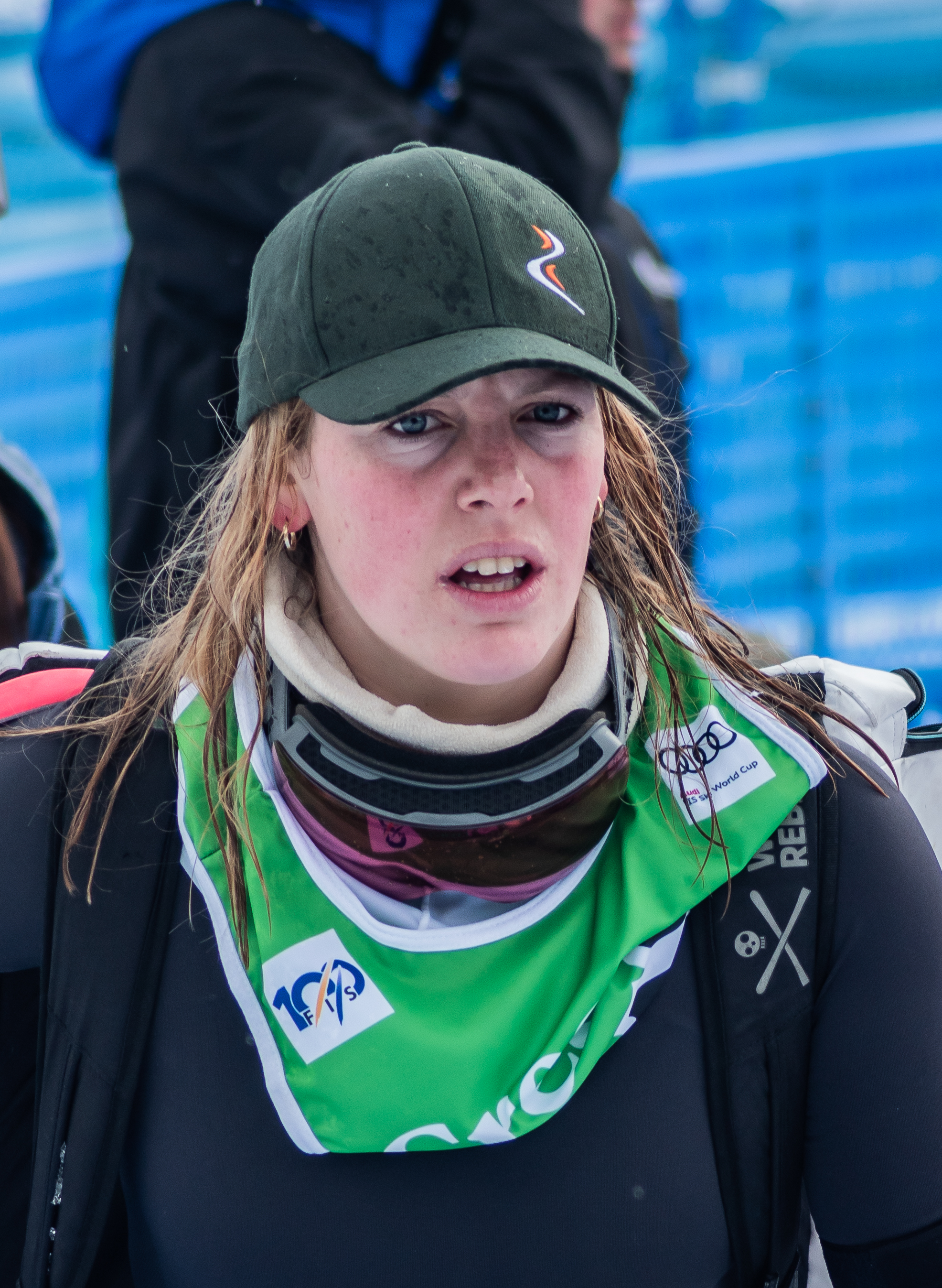
- At Soldeu in 2024

Personal information
- Full name: Amelia Josephine Hurt
- Born: December 5, 2000 (age 25) Truckee, California, U.S.

Skiing career
- Country: United States
- Sport: Alpine skiing
- Club: Palisades Tahoe
- Disciplines: Slalom, Giant slalom, Super-G, Combined
- World Cup debut: November 25, 2017 (age 16)

Olympics
- Teams: 2 – (2022, 2026)
- Medals: 0

World Championships
- Teams: 2 – (2021, 2025)
- Medals: 0

World Cup
- Seasons: 9 – (2018–2026)
- Wins: 0
- Podiums: 2 – (1 GS, 1 SL)
- Overall titles: 0 – (32nd in 2024)
- Discipline titles: 0 – (14th in GS, 2025)

Amelia Josephine Hurt (born December 5, 2000) is an American World Cup alpine ski racer. She made her World Cup debut in November 2017 in Killington, Vermont, and competed for the U.S. at the World Championships in 2021 and the Winter Olympics in 2022 and 2026.

== World Cup results ==
=== Season standings ===
Season
Season	Age	Overall	Slalom	Giant slalom	Super-G	Downhill	Parallel
2021	20	82	55	37	56	—	25
2022	21	89	—	37	—	—	26
2023	22	no World Cup points earned					—N/a
2024	23	32	31	15	—	—	—N/a
2025	24	43	29	14	—	—	—N/a
2026	25	51	30	22	—	—	—N/a
2027	26	13	—	13	—	—	—N/a

Standings through October 26, 2026

=== Top-ten results ===
- 0 wins
- 2 podiums (1 GS, 1 SL), 9 top tens

Season
Season	Date	Location	Discipline	Place
2024	December 3, 2023	Tremblant, Canada	Giant slalom	9th
2024	January 7, 2024	Kranjska Gora, Slovenia	Slalom	3rd
2024	January 20, 2024	Jasná, Slovakia	Giant slalom	7th
2024	February 10, 2024	Soldeu, Andorra	Giant slalom	3rd
2025	January 4, 2025	Kranjska Gora, Slovenia	Giant slalom	10th
2025	February 22, 2025	Sestriere, Italy	Giant slalom	7th
2025	March 25, 2025	Sun Valley, United States	Giant slalom	8th
2026	January 24, 2026	Špindlerův Mlýn, Czech Republic	Giant slalom	8th
2026	March 14, 2026	(Sweden) Åre, Czech Republic	Giant slalom	9th

== World Championship results ==
Year
Year	Age	Slalom	Giant slalom	Super-G	Downhill	Combined	Team combined	Parallel	Team event
2021	20	DNF2	DNF1	29	—	DNF2	—N/a	28	—
2025	24	19	13	—	—	—N/a	16	—N/a	—

== Olympic results ==
Year
Year	Age	Slalom	Giant slalom	Super-G	Downhill	Combined	Team combined	Team event
2022	21	34	DNF1	—	—	—	—N/a	—
2026	25	19	DNF1	—	—	—N/a	15	—N/a

== United States Championships ==
- United States giant slalom champion in 2018
- United States slalom champion in 2020
- United States combined champion in 2018
