= Franziska Gritsch =

Austrian alpine skier (born 1997)

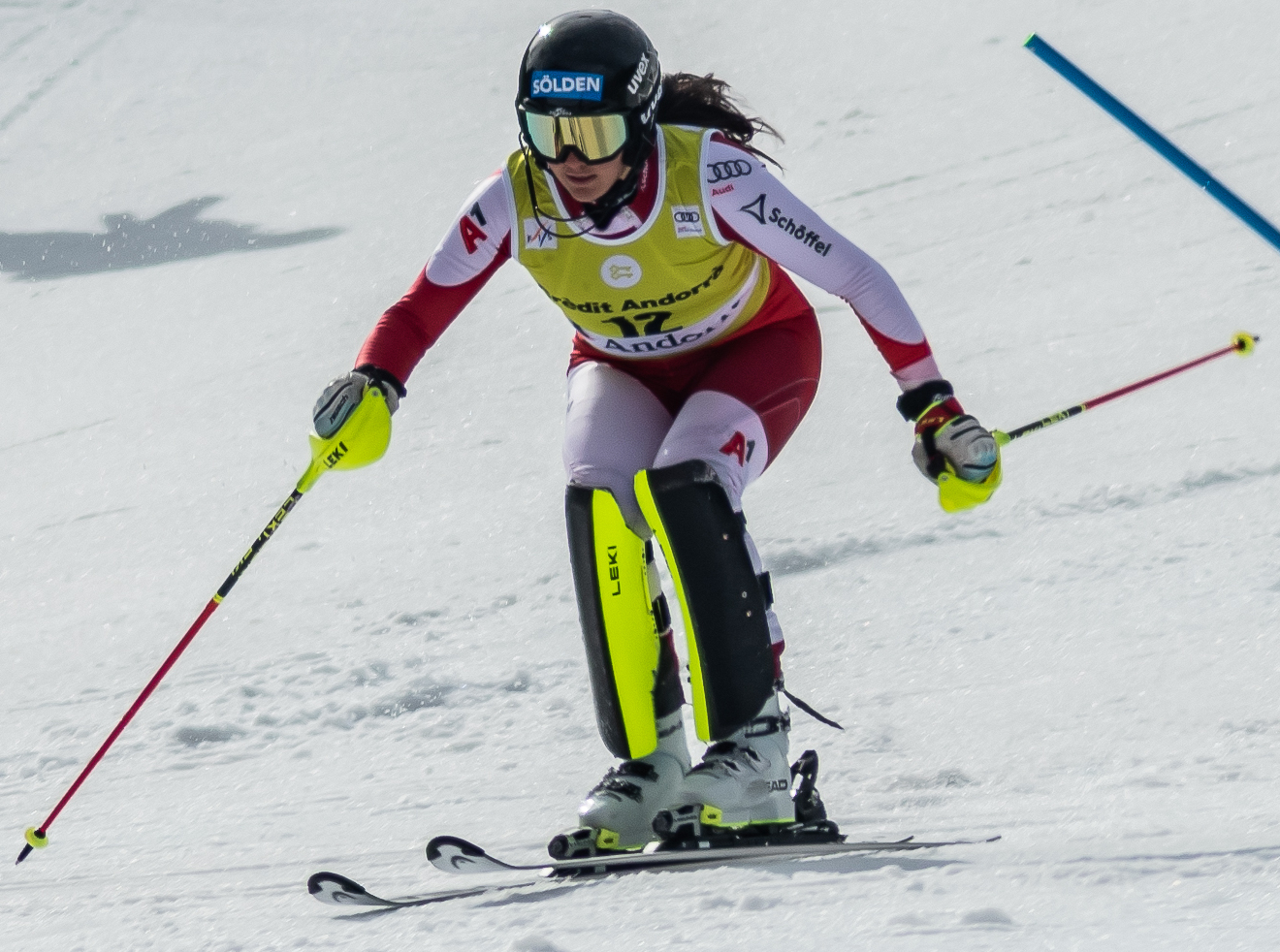

Personal information
- Born: 15 March 1997 (age 29) Innsbruck, Austria
- Height: 1.69 m (5 ft 7 in)

Skiing career
- Country: Austria
- Sport: Alpine skiing
- Club: SC Sölden
- Disciplines: Slalom, giant slalom, super-G, combined
- World Cup debut: 28 December 2017 (age 20)

World Championships
- Teams: 3 − (2019, 2021, 2023)
- Medals: 1 (0 gold)

World Cup
- Seasons: 9 − (2018-2026)
- Wins: 0
- Podiums: 3 – (1 SG, 1 AC, 1 PSL)
- Overall titles: 0 – (26th in 2020)
- Discipline titles: 0 – (4th in AC, 2020)
Medal record
Women's alpine skiing
Representing Austria
World Championships
Silver medal – second place	2019 Åre	Team event

Franziska Gritsch (born 15 March 1997) is an Austrian World Cup alpine ski racer and specializes in the technical events of slalom and giant slalom. She competed in three World Championships, winning a silver medal in the team event in 2019.

== World Cup results ==
=== Season standings ===
Season
Season	Age	Overall	Slalom	Giant slalom	Super G	Downhill	Combined	Parallel
2019	21	73	36	—	—	—	14	—N/a
2020	22	26	22	21	—	—	4	8
2021	23	37	15	26	—	—	—N/a	14
2022	24	69	40	32	—	—	—N/a	29
2023	25	23	13	18	23	48	—N/a	—N/a
2024	26	33	29	19	35	—	—N/a	—N/a
2025	27	68	30	37	—	—	—N/a	—N/a
2026	28	77	46	32	—	—	—N/a	—N/a
2027	29	9	—	9	—	—	—N/a	—N/a

Standings through 26 October 2026

=== Race podiums ===
- 0 wins
- 3 podiums (1 SG, 1 AC, 1 PS); 17 top tens

Season
Season	Date	Location	Discipline	Place
2020	15 December 2019	St. Moritz, Switzerland	Parallel slalom	3rd
2020	23 February 2020	Crans-Montana, Switzerland	Combined	2nd
2023	5 March 2023	Kvitfjell, Norway	Super-G	3rd

== World Championship results ==
Year
Year	Age	Slalom	Giant slalom	Super G	Downhill	Combined	Parallel	Team event
2019	21	—	—	—	—	8	—N/a	2
2021	23	11	DNF1	—	—	11	—	—
2023	25	13	12	—	—	5	7	4
