= 2027 Alpine Skiing World Cup – Women's overall =

Alpine ski discipline year standings

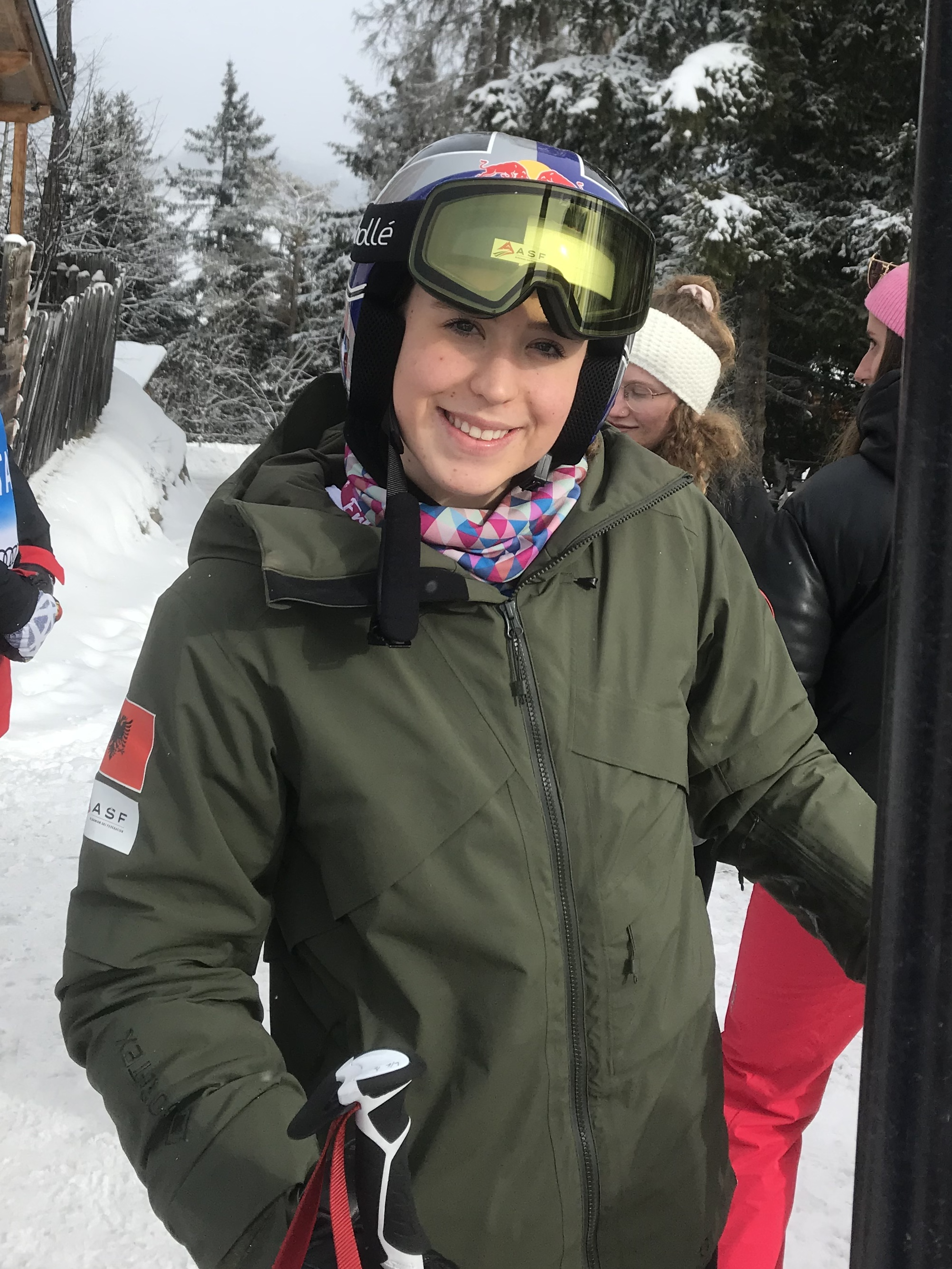
2027 Women's Overall World Cup: Lara Colturi of Albania, current leader; 2027 Women's World Cup; Overall • Downhill • Super-G; Giant slalom • Slalom
Previous: 2026	Next: 2028

The women's overall competition in the 2027 FIS Alpine Skiing World Cup is scheduled to consist of 40 events in four disciplines: downhill (DH) (9 races), super-G (SG) (9 races), giant slalom (GS) (12 races), and slalom (SL) (10 races). A tentative schedule was circulated on 7 May 2026 following the FIS Alpine Spring Meeting in Portorož, Slovenia. The schedule was released on 17 July 2026 and features events at 20 different resorts, beginning with the traditional opener: a giant slalom on the Rettenbach ski course, located on the Rettenbach glacier in Sölden, Austria, on 24 October 2026. The World Cup Finals in all events for the season will be held in Sun Valley, Idaho (U.S.) from 20 to 25 March 2027.

The schedule is subject to amendment or revision during the season, although the only amendments likely to be made to it would be caused either by adverse weather or by issues with the facilities in Narvik, Norway (scheduled for 12–13 March, the last weekend before finals). And, on 19 October 2026, the Narvik organizing committee indeed decided to withdraw from holding the scheduled downhill and super-G, requiring rescheduling, although the committee remained committed to having all needed facilities in Narvik ready in time to host the FIS Alpine World Ski Championships in 2029, for which this was intended as a warm-up. On 29 October 2026, the races were moved to the Kvitfjell course in Norway that just hosted last year's World Cup finals.

Defending champion Mikaela Shiffrin of the U.S. narrowly defeated Emma Aicher of Germany, the only competitor to compete in every discipline during the 2026 season, to win her women's-record-tying sixth overall victory. However, for the current season, Shiffrin has announced that she is planning to change her focus from slalom (in which she has won the discipline championship 9 times, including last year) to giant slalom (an event where she had suffered from PTSD after a life-threatening injury during a race in November 2024, despite the fact that she won the discipline championship in both 2019 and 2023) and super-G (in which she won the discipline championship in 2019 but hasn't won a race since December 2022), which means that she will compete in fewer slaloms during the season (including skipping the first two slaloms).

As is the case every odd-numbered year, the FIS Alpine World Ski Championships will take place, this time in Crans Montana, Switzerland during 1–14 February 2027.

== Season summary ==
=== The opening months (Oct. 2026 to Christmas) ===
in increasingly foggy and dark conditions at the season-opening giant slalom at Sölden (Austria), Shiffrin's teammate and longtime rival Paula Moltzan edged out Albania's Lara Colturi by one one-hundredth of a second to record her first career World Cup victory (in her 149th start), thus becoming (at 32) the oldest woman to become a first-time winner on the World Cup circuit. Three weeks later, in the slalom at Levi (Finland), German's all-event skier Emma Aicher (who was third at Sölden) drew the first starting time and then led after both legs to win, not only ending a 14-race string of Levi slaloms won by either Shiffrin (not competing) or Slovakia's Petra Vlhová (who finished 16th) but also earning her first-ever slalom victory (to join five wins in speed events) on the day after her 23rd birthday. Colturi, on the day before her 20th birthday, again finished second, moving herself and Aicher into a tie for the overall lead. But the next week, in Gurgl (AUT), Colturi celebrated her birthday more fully by overtaking Anna Swenn Larsson of Sweden on her second run to record her first World Cup victory, thus taking over first place for the season overall.

== Finals ==
The finals in all disciplines will be held from 20 to 25 March 2027 in Sun Valley, Idaho, U.S. Only the top 25 skiers in each World Cup discipline and the winner of the 2027 FIS Junior World Championships in the discipline, plus any skiers who have scored at least 500 points in the World Cup overall classification for the season, will be eligible to compete in the final, and only the top 15 finishers will earn World Cup points.

== Standings ==
#	Skier	DH; 0 races	SG; 0 races	GS; 1 race	SL; 2 races	Total
1	(Albania) Lara Colturi	0	0	80	180	260
2	(Germany) Emma Aicher	0	0	60	132	192
3	(Sweden) Sara Hector	0	0	50	100	150
4	(United States) Paula Moltzan	0	0	100	20	120
5	(Croatia) Zrinka Ljutić	0	0	24	86	110
6	(Switzerland) Camille Rast	0	0	40	69	109
7	(Sweden) Anna Swenn Larsson	0	0	0	105	105
8	(United States) AJ Hurt	0	0	20	66	86
9	(France) Marion Chevrier	0	0	0	64	64
10	(Sweden) Hanna Aronsson Elfman	0	0	12	49	61
11	(Austria) Katharina Truppe	0	0	0	60	60
12	(Italy) Lara Della Mea	0	0	13	40	53
13	(Latvia) Dženifera Ģērmane	0	0	0	48	48
14	(Italy) Asja Zenere	0	0	45	0	45
15	(Germany) Lena Dürr	0	0	9	35	44
16	(France) Marie Lamure	0	0	0	43	43
17	(Switzerland) Wendy Holdener	0	0	11	26	37
18	(United States) Mikaela Shiffrin	0	0	36	0	36
19	(Austria) Franziska Gritsch	0	0	29	6	35
20	(Australia) Madison Hoffman	0	0	0	32	32
	(New Zealand) Alice Robinson	0	0	32	0	32
22	(Switzerland) Aline Höpli	0	0	0	30	30
23	(Poland) Maryna Gąsienica-Daniel	0	0	29	0	29
	(Austria) Katharina Huber	0	0	0	29	29
25	(Slovenia) Neja Dvornik	0	0	1	27	28
26	(Slovakia) Petra Vlhová	0	0	8	15	23
	(France) Caitlin McFarlane	0	0	0	23	23
28	(Sweden) Estelle Alphand	0	0	22	0	22
29	(Liechtenstein) Charlotte Lingg	0	0	0	19	19
30	(United States) Elisabeth Bocock	0	0	18	0	18
31	(Sweden) Hilma Lövblom	0	0	16	0	16
	(Switzerland) Selina Egloff	0	0	0	16	16
33	(United States) Nina O'Brien	0	0	15	0	15
	(Norway) Mina Fürst Holtmann	0	0	15	0	15
	(United States) Katie Hensien	0	0	0	15	15
36	(Switzerland) Eliane Christen	0	0	0	14	14
37	(Italy) Beatrice Sola	0	0	0	12	12
38	(Czech Republic) Martina Dubovská	0	0	0	11	11
	(Norway) Thea Louise Stjernesund	0	0	11	0	11
40	(Sweden) Cornelia Öhlund	0	0	0	10	10
41	(Canada) Laurence St-Germain	0	0	0	9	9
42	(Austria) Valentina Rings-Wanner	0	0	0	8	8
	(United States) Liv Moritz	0	0	0	8	8
44	(Switzerland) Simone Wild	0	0	7	0	7
	(Italy) Martina Peterlini	0	0	0	7	7
46	(Switzerland) Stefanie Grob	0	0	6	0	6
47	(Germany) Kira Weidle-Winkelmann	0	0	5	0	5
48	(Canada) Britt Richardson	0	0	4	0	4
49	(Switzerland) Vanessa Kasper	0	0	3	0	3
50	(Italy) Alice Pazzaglia	0	0	2	0	2
51	(Italy) Sofia Goggia	0	0	0	0	0
	(Italy) Laura Pirovano	0	0	0	0	0
	(Austria) Julia Scheib	0	0	0	0	0
	(Austria) Cornelia Hütter	0	0	0	0	0
	(United States) Lindsey Vonn	0	0	0	0	0
	(Norway) Kajsa Vickhoff Lie	0	0	0	0	0
	(United States) Breezy Johnson	0	0	0	0	0
	(Switzerland) Corinne Suter	0	0	0	0	0
	(France) Romane Miradoli	0	0	0	0	0
	(Canada) Valérie Grenier	0	0	0	0	0
	(Austria) Ariane Rädler	0	0	0	0	0
	(Italy) Elena Curtoni	0	0	0	0	0
	(Austria) Nina Ortlieb	0	0	0	0	0
	(Switzerland) Malorie Blanc	0	0	0	0	0
	(Italy) Nicol Delago	0	0	0	0	0
	(United States) Jacqueline Wiles	0	0	0	0	0
	(United States) Keely Cashman	0	0	0	0	0
	(Austria) Katharina Liensberger	0	0	0	0	0
	(France) Laura Gauché	0	0	0	0	0
	(Italy) Roberta Melesi	0	0	0	0	0
	(Austria) Stephanie Brunner	0	0	0	0	0
	(France) Camille Cerutti	0	0	0	0	0
	(Austria) Magdalena Egger	0	0	0	0	0
	(Norway) Marte Monsen	0	0	0	0	0
	(Switzerland) Mélanie Meillard	0	0	0	0	0
	(Austria) Katharina Gallhuber	0	0	0	0	0
	(Italy) Nadia Delago	0	0	0	0	0
	(United States) Allison Mollin	0	0	0	0	0
	(Italy) Federica Brignone	0	0	0	0	0
	(Switzerland) Janine Schmitt	0	0	0	0	0
	(Austria) Nadine Fest	0	0	0	0	0
	(Austria) Nina Astner	0	0	0	0	0
	(United States) Mary Bocock	0	0	0	0	0
	(Switzerland) Jasmine Flury	0	0	0	0	0
	(Switzerland) Sue Piller	0	0	0	0	0
	(Austria) Ricarda Haaser	0	0	0	0	0
	(Austria) Lisa Hörhager	0	0	0	0	0
	(Italy) Anna Trocker	0	0	0	0	0
	(Switzerland) Jasmina Suter	0	0	0	0	0
	(Norway) Madeleine Sylvester-Davik	0	0	0	0	0
	(Austria) Natalie Falch	0	0	0	0	0
	(United States) Isabella Wright	0	0	0	0	0
	(United States) Tricia Mangan	0	0	0	0	0
	(United States) Haley Cutler	0	0	0	0	0
	(Italy) Ilaria Ghisalberti	0	0	0	0	0
	(Canada) Cassidy Gray	0	0	0	0	0
	(Switzerland) Delia Durrer	0	0	0	0	0
	(Italy) Emilia Mondinelli	0	0	0	0	0
	(Switzerland) Anuk Brändli	0	0	0	0	0
	(Norway) Bianca Bakke Westhoff	0	0	0	0	0
	(France) Doriane Escané	0	0	0	0	0
	(Germany) Fabiana Dorigo	0	0	0	0	0
	(Canada) Amelia Smart	0	0	0	0	0
	(Switzerland) Priska Ming-Nufer	0	0	0	0	0
	(Switzerland) Aline Danioth	0	0	0	0	0
	(Finland) Erika Pykalainen	0	0	0	0	0
	(Italy) Sara Allemand	0	0	0	0	0
	(Switzerland) Dania Allenbach	0	0	0	0	0
	(Sweden) Sophie Nyberg	0	0	0	0	0
	(Italy) Giulia Valleriani	0	0	0	0	0
	(Italy) Sara Thaler	0	0	0	0	0
	(Austria) Lena Wechner	0	0	0	0	0
	(Bosnia and Herzegovina) Elvedina Muzaferija	0	0	0	0	0
	(Andorra) Carla Mijares Ruf	0	0	0	0	0
	(Switzerland) Nicole Good	0	0	0	0	0
	(Canada) Ali Nullmeyer	0	0	0	0	0
	(Canada) Justine Lamontagne	0	0	0	0	0
	(Austria) Victoria Olivier	0	0	0	0	0
	(Germany) Jessica Hilzinger	0	0	0	0	0
	(Japan) Chisaki Maeda	0	0	0	0	0
	(Croatia) Leona Popović	0	0	0	0	0
	(Switzerland) Jasmin Mathis	0	0	0	0	0
	(Italy) Giorgia Collomb	0	0	0	0	0
	(Slovenia) Nika Tomšič	0	0	0	0	0
	(Andorra) Cande Moreno	0	0	0	0	0
	(France) Garance Meyer	0	0	0	0	0
	(Germany) Jana Fritz	0	0	0	0	0
	(Austria) Emily Schöpf	0	0	0	0	0
	(Austria) Viktoria Bürgler	0	0	0	0	0
	(Sweden) Moa Landström	0	0	0	0	0
	(Hungary) Zita Tóth	0	0	0	0	0
	(Norway) Inni Holm Wembstad	0	0	0	0	0
	(Finland) Rosa Pohjolainen	0	0	0	0	0
	(Austria) Carmen Spielberger	0	0	0	0	0
	(Israel) Noa Szőllős	0	0	0	0	0
	(Austria) Leonie Raich	0	0	0	0	0
	(Austria) Lisa Grill	0	0	0	0	0
	(Austria) Leonie Zegg	0	0	0	0	0

- Leader
- 2nd place
- 3rd place
- does not compete in this discipline
- Updated on 21 November 2026, after 3 of 40 races.

== See also ==
- 2027 Alpine Skiing World Cup – Women's summary rankings
- 2027 Alpine Skiing World Cup – Women's downhill
- 2027 Alpine Skiing World Cup – Women's super-G
- 2027 Alpine Skiing World Cup – Women's giant slalom
- 2027 Alpine Skiing World Cup – Women's slalom
- 2027 Alpine Skiing World Cup – Men's overall
- World Cup scoring system
