= 2027 Alpine Skiing World Cup – Women's giant slalom =

Alpine ski discipline year standings

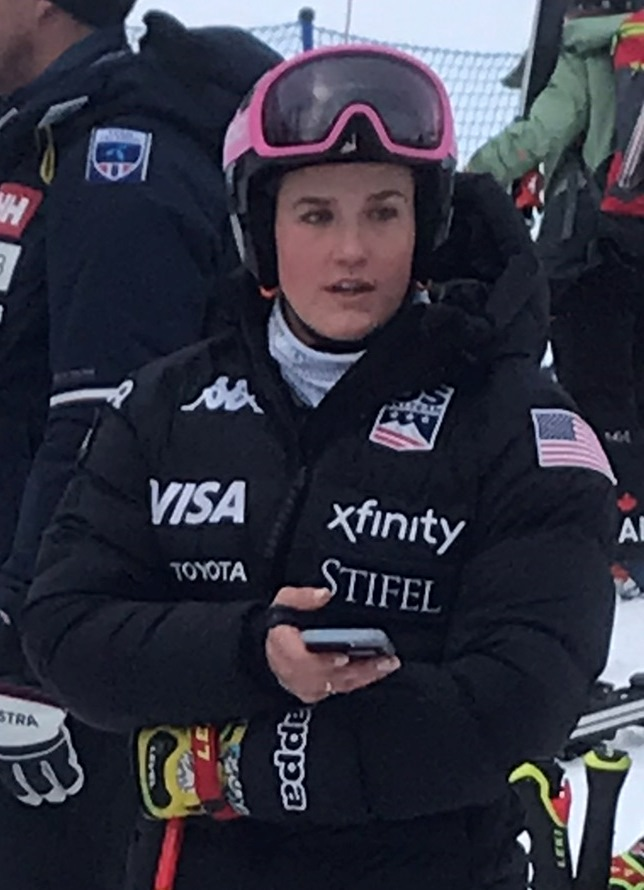
2027 Women's Giant Slalom World Cup: Paula Moltzan of the U.S., current leader; 2027 Women's World Cup; Overall • Downhill • Super-G; Giant slalom • Slalom
Previous: 2026	Next: 2028

The women's giant slalom in the 2027 FIS Alpine Skiing World Cup is scheduled to consist of twelve events, including the final. As per the tentative schedule released on 7 May and the official schedule released on 17 July 2026, the season was scheduled to begin with the traditional opener: a giant slalom on the Rettenbach ski course, located on the Rettenbach glacier in Sölden, Austria, on 24 October 2026. The next three giant slaloms were planned to take place in North America in late November and early December, including a return to Michaela Shiffrin's boarding school course at Killington, Vermont (after skipping it last year die to renovations). The remainder of the races are scheduled to be held in Europe, until the tour returns to North America for the World Cup finals.

Last season, Austria's Julia Scheib broke through at 27 years old for her first five World Cup victories, all in this discipline, to clinch the season title prior to finals.

The season is scheduled to be interrupted for the biennial FIS Alpine World Ski Championships 2027, scheduled for 1–14 February 2027 on the Mont Lachaux course in Crans Montana, Switzerland. The championship in women's giant slalom is scheduled to be held on Thursday, 11 February.

== Season summary ==
After the first heat of the first race at Sölden, Mikaela Shiffrin of the U.S. (seeking her 111th World Cup victory) held a narrow lead over Sara Hector of Sweden. However, increasingly foggy and dark conditions near the end of the overcast and freezing day led to the top four racers all failing to podium after the second heat, while Shiffrin's teammate and longtime rival Paula Moltzan, who had achieved her best World Cup finish at Sölden last year with a second, edged out Albania's Lara Colturi by one one-hundredth of a second to record her first career World Cup victory (in her 149th start), thus becoming (at 32) the oldest woman to become a first-time winner.

== Finals ==
The finals in women's giant slalom are scheduled to take place on Monday, 23 March 2027 on the Greyhawk ski course at Sun Valley, Idaho, U.S. Only the top 25 skiers in the World Cup giant slalom discipline and the winner of the 2027 FIS Junior World Championships in the discipline, plus any skiers who have scored at least 500 points in the World Cup overall classification for the season, will be eligible to compete in the final, and only the top 15 will earn World Cup points.

== Standings ==
	Venue	24 Oct 2026; Sölden	28 Nov 2026; Killington	5 Dec 2026; Tremblant	6 Dec 2026; Tremblant	20 Dec 2026; St. Moritz	28 Dec 2026; Gosau	4 Jan 2027; Flachau	19 Jan 2027; Kronplatz	23 Jan 2027; Jasná	29 Jan 2027; Kranjska Gora	11 Feb 2027; Crans Montana WC	6 Mar 2027; Soldeu	23 Mar 2027; Sun Valley	
#	Skier	(Austria)	(United States)	(Canada)	(Canada)	(Switzerland)	(Austria)	(Austria)	(Italy)	(Slovakia)	(Slovenia)	(Switzerland)	(Andorra)	(United States)	Total
1	(United States) Paula Moltzan	100													100
2	(Albania) Lara Colturi	80													80
3	(Germany) Emma Aicher	60													60
4	(Sweden) Sara Hector	50													50
5	(Italy) Asja Zenere	45													45
6	(Switzerland) Camille Rast	40													40
7	(United States) Mikaela Shiffrin	36													36
8	(New Zealand) Alice Robinson	32													32
9	(Austria) Franziska Gritsch	29													29
	(Poland) Maryna Gąsienica-Daniel	29													29
11	(Croatia) Zrinka Ljutić	24													24
12	(Sweden) Estelle Alphand	22													22
13	(United States) AJ Hurt	20													20
14	(United States) Elisabeth Bocock	18													18
15	(Sweden) Hilma Lövblom	16													16
16	(United States) Nina O'Brien	15													15
	(Norway) Mina Fürst Holtmann	15													15
18	(Italy) Lara Della Mea	13													13
19	(Sweden) Hanna Aronsson Elfman	12													12
20	(Norway) Thea Louise Stjernesund	11													11
	(Switzerland) Wendy Holdener	11													11
22	(Germany) Lena Dürr	9													9
23	(Slovakia) Petra Vlhová	8													8
24	(Switzerland) Simone Wild	7													7
25	(Switzerland) Stefanie Grob	6													6
26	(Germany) Kira Weidle-Winkelmann	5													5
27	(Canada) Britt Richardson	4													4
28	(Switzerland) Vanessa Kasper	3													3
29	(Italy) Alice Pazzaglia	2													2
30	(Slovenia) Neja Dvornik	1													1
31	(Austria) Stephanie Brunner	DNQ													0
	(Austria) Nina Astner	DNS													0
	(Switzerland) Sue Piller	DNQ													0
	(Austria) Katharina Liensberger	DNS													0
	(Norway) Madeleine Sylvester-Davik	DNQ													0
	(Austria) Julia Scheib	DNF1													0
	(Italy) Federica Brignone	DNS													0
	(Canada) Valérie Grenier	DNS													0
	(Italy) Sofia Goggia	DNS													0
	(Italy) Ilaria Ghisalberti	DNQ													0
	(Canada) Cassidy Gray	DNQ													0
	(Austria) Ricarda Haaser	DNQ													0
	(Italy) Anna Trocker	DNQ													0
	(Norway) Kajsa Vickhoff Lie	DNS													0
	(Germany) Fabiana Dorigo	DNQ													0
	(United States) Katie Hensien	DNQ													0
	(France) Doriane Escané	DNQ													0
	(Finland) Erika Pykalainen	DNS													0
	(Switzerland) Dania Allenbach	DNQ													0
	(Sweden) Sophie Nyberg	DNQ													0
	(Austria) Lisa Hörhager	DNS													0
	(Austria) Victoria Olivier	DNQ													0
	(Italy) Laura Pirovano	DNQ													0
	(Italy) Giorgia Collomb	DNQ													0
	(Germany) Jana Fritz	DNQ													0
	(Austria) Viktoria Bürgler	DNS													0
	(Canada) Justine Lamontagne	DNQ													0
	(France) Camille Cerutti	DNS													0
	References														

=== Legend ===
- Winner (100 points)
- 2nd place (80 points)
- 3rd place (60 points)
- DNQ = Did not qualify for run 2
- DNF1 = Did not finish run 1
- DSQ1 = Disqualified run 1
- DNF2 = Did not finish run 2
- DSQ2 = Disqualified run 2
- DNS2 = Did not start run 2
- Did not start (DNS)
- Not eligible for finals (NE)
- Race canceled (x)
- FIS non-World Cup race (Olympics)
- R# = Rescheduled (make-up) race
- Updated on 24 October 2026, after 1 race.

== See also ==
- 2027 Alpine Skiing World Cup – Women's summary rankings
- 2027 Alpine Skiing World Cup – Women's overall
- 2027 Alpine Skiing World Cup – Women's downhill
- 2027 Alpine Skiing World Cup – Women's super-G
- 2027 Alpine Skiing World Cup – Women's slalom
- World Cup scoring system
