= Lara Colturi =

Italian-Albanian alpine skier (born 2006)

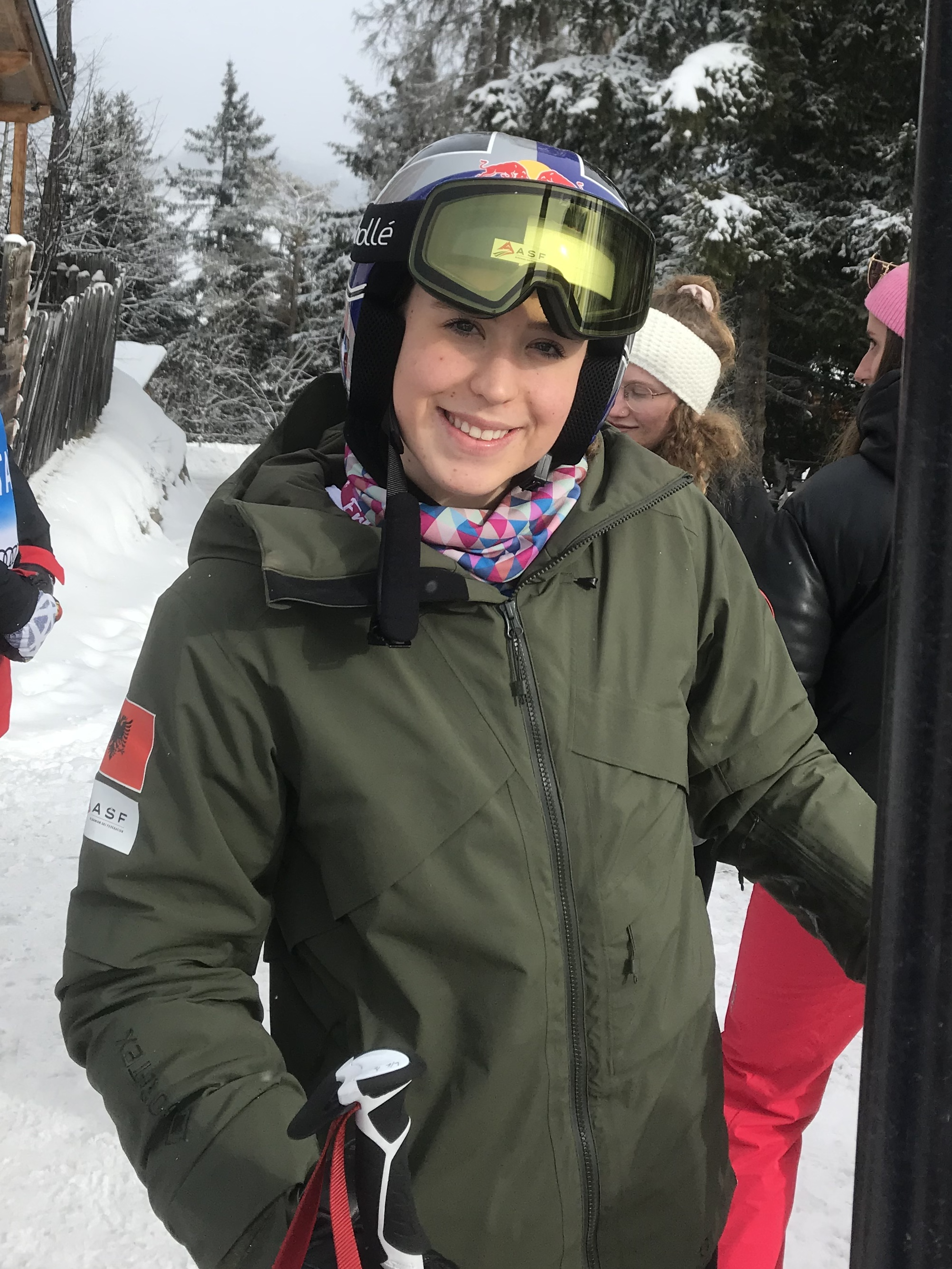
- Colturi in 2023

Personal information
- Born: 15 November 2006 (age 20) Turin, Italy

Skiing career
- Country: Albania
- Sport: Alpine skiing
- Club: Golden Team Ceccarelli
- Disciplines: Slalom; Giant slalom Super-G
- World Cup debut: 19 November 2022 (age 16)

Olympics
- Teams: 1 – (2026)
- Medals: 0

World Championships
- Teams: 1 – (2025)
- Medals: 0

World Cup
- Seasons: 5 – (2023–2027)
- Wins: 1 – (1 SL)
- Podiums: 10 – (7 SL, 3 GS)
- Overall titles: 0 – (8th in 2025)
- Discipline titles: 0 – (5th in GS, 2025)
Medal record
Women's alpine skiing
Representing Albania
World Cup race podiums
Event	1st	2nd	3rd
Slalom	1	4	2
Giant slalom	0	2	1
Total	1	6	3
South American Cup race podiums
Event	1st	2nd	3rd
Slalom	2	0	0
Giant slalom	3	0	0
Super-G	0	2	0
Combined	1	0	0
Total	6	2	0
International competitions
Event	1st	2nd	3rd
Junior World Championships	1	0	2
Junior World Championships
Gold medal – first place	2023 St. Anton	Super-G
Bronze medal – third place	2023 St. Anton	Giant slalom
Bronze medal – third place	2024 Port du Soleil	Giant slalom

Lara Colturi (born 15 November 2006) is an Italian-born Albanian World Cup alpine ski racer who specializes in the technical events of slalom and giant slalom. She won the 2022 FIS Alpine Ski South American Cup.

== Biography ==
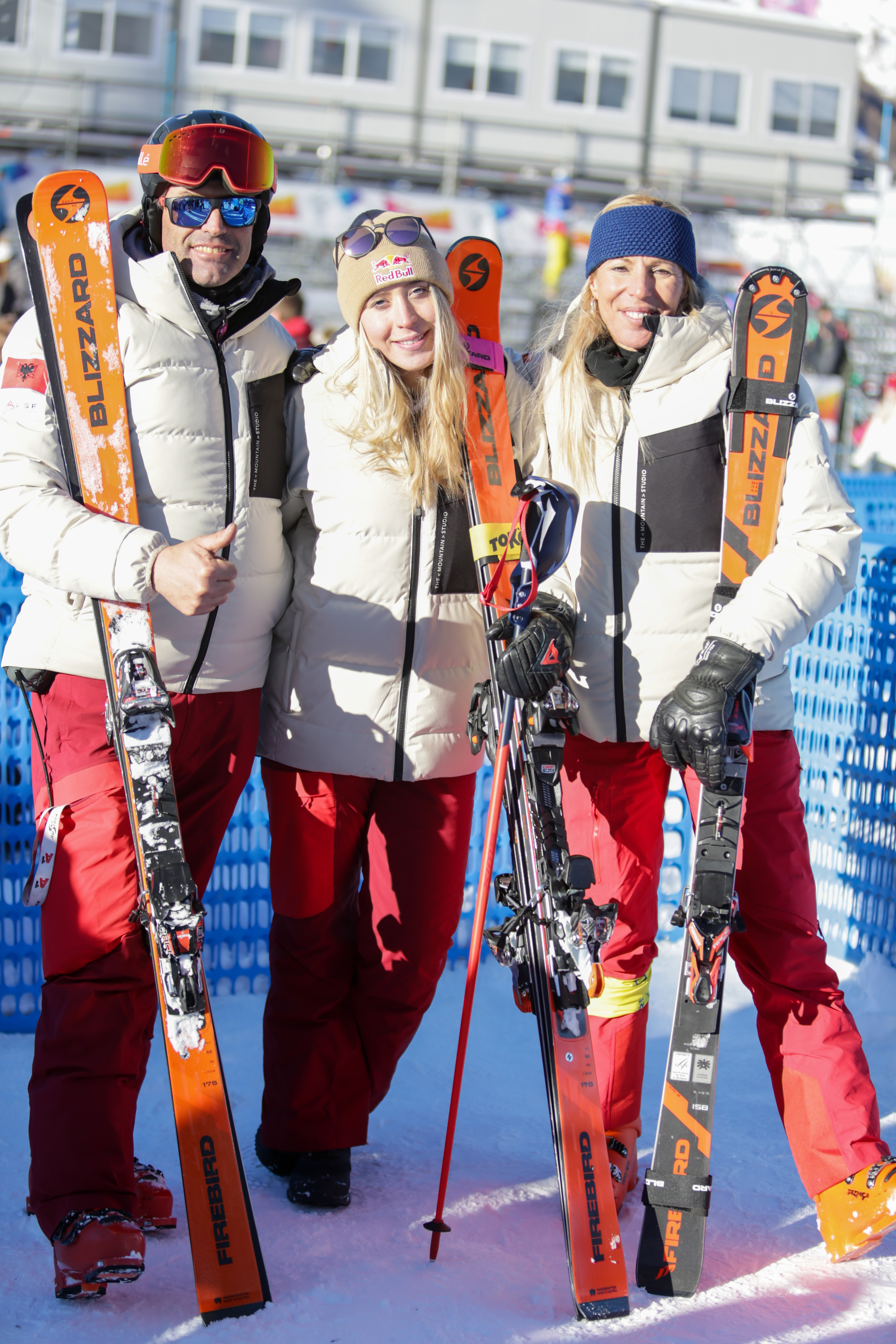
Colturi with her parents.

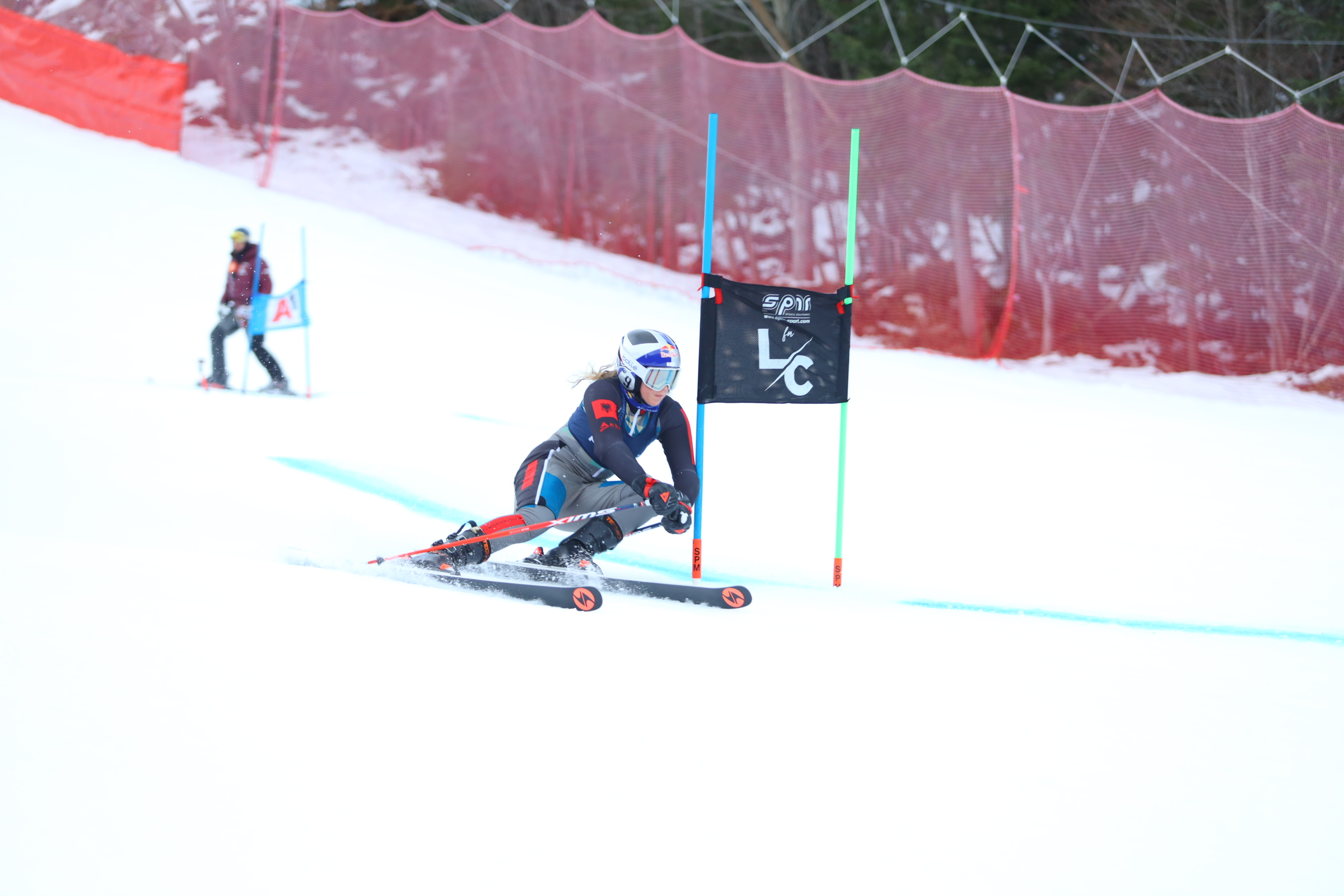
Colturi in action in January 2023.

Lara Colturi is the daughter of former Olympic champion Daniela Ceccarelli and ski coach Alessandro Colturi. She was born in Turin and grew up in Cesana Torinese in the Susa Valley. She has one younger brother, Yuri.

Her mother started consulting for the Albanian Ski Federation in 2020, and became Technical Director of their women's alpine team the following season. In May 2022, Colturi received an FIS affiliation with the ASF and she began to represent Albania internationally.

Colturi won the overall, slalom, giant slalom, and alpine combined at the South American Alpine Ski Cup titles.

On 19 November 2022, during the 2023 Alpine Ski World Cup, Colturi made her World Cup debut in the slalom in Levi, Finland, missing qualifications for the second heat. She finished 17th the following week in the giant slalom, earning her first points in the Alpine Ski World Cup.

Colturi became the third-youngest gold medalist at Junior World Championships 2023, when she won the super-G in St. Anton, Austria.

On 7 February 2023, Colturi tore the cruciate ligament in her right knee while training. Less than nine months later, she returned to World Cup ski racing in Sölden on 28 October.

== Personal life ==
Colturi has been in a relationship with French motorcycle racer Mathias Michaud, who competes in the French Superbike Championship.

== World Cup results ==
=== Season standings ===
Season
Season	Age	Overall	Slalom	Giant slalom	Super-G	Downhill	Longines Rising; Ski Star
2023 (Note: 2023 season interrupted due to injury February 7th)	16	78	50	30	—	—	4
2024	17	45	25	22	—	—	2
2025	18	8	10	5	—	—	2
2026	19	15	7	12	—	—	1
2027	20	1	1	2	—	—	1

Standings through 21 November 2026

=== Race podiums ===
- 1 win – (1 SL)
- 10 podiums – (7 SL, 3 GS); 23 top tens

Season
Season	Date	Location	Discipline	Place
2025	23 November 2024	Gurgl, Austria	Slalom	2nd
2025	4 January 2025	Kranjska Gora, Slovenia	Giant slalom	2nd
2025	8 March 2025	Åre, Sweden	Giant slalom	3rd
2026	15 November 2025	Levi, Finland	Slalom	2nd
2026	23 November 2025	Gurgl, Austria	Slalom	2nd
2026	30 November 2025	Copper Mountain, United States	Slalom	3rd
2026	28 December 2025	Semmering, Austria	Slalom	3rd
2027	24 October 2026	Sölden, Austria	Giant slalom	2nd
2027	14 November 2026	Levi, Finland	Slalom	2nd
2027	21 November 2026	Gurgl, Austria	Slalom	1st

== World Championship results ==
Year
Year	Age	Slalom	Giant slalom	Super-G	Downhill	Team combined	Team event
2025	18	DNF1	7	—	—	—	—

== Olympic results ==
Year
Year	Age	Slalom	Giant slalom	Super-G	Downhill	Team combined
2026	19	10	16	—	—	—

== South American Cup results ==
Colturi has won an overall South American Cup and three specialty standings.

- FIS Alpine Ski South American Cup
  - Overall: 2022
  - Slalom: 2022
  - Giant slalom: 2022
  - Combined: 2022

== Notes ==
Olympic Games
Preceded by Zelimkhan Abakarov; Kaltra Meca	Flagbearer for Albania; Milano Cortina 2026 with Denni Xhepa	Succeeded by Incumbent
