= Zrinka Ljutić =

Croatian alpine skier (born 2004)

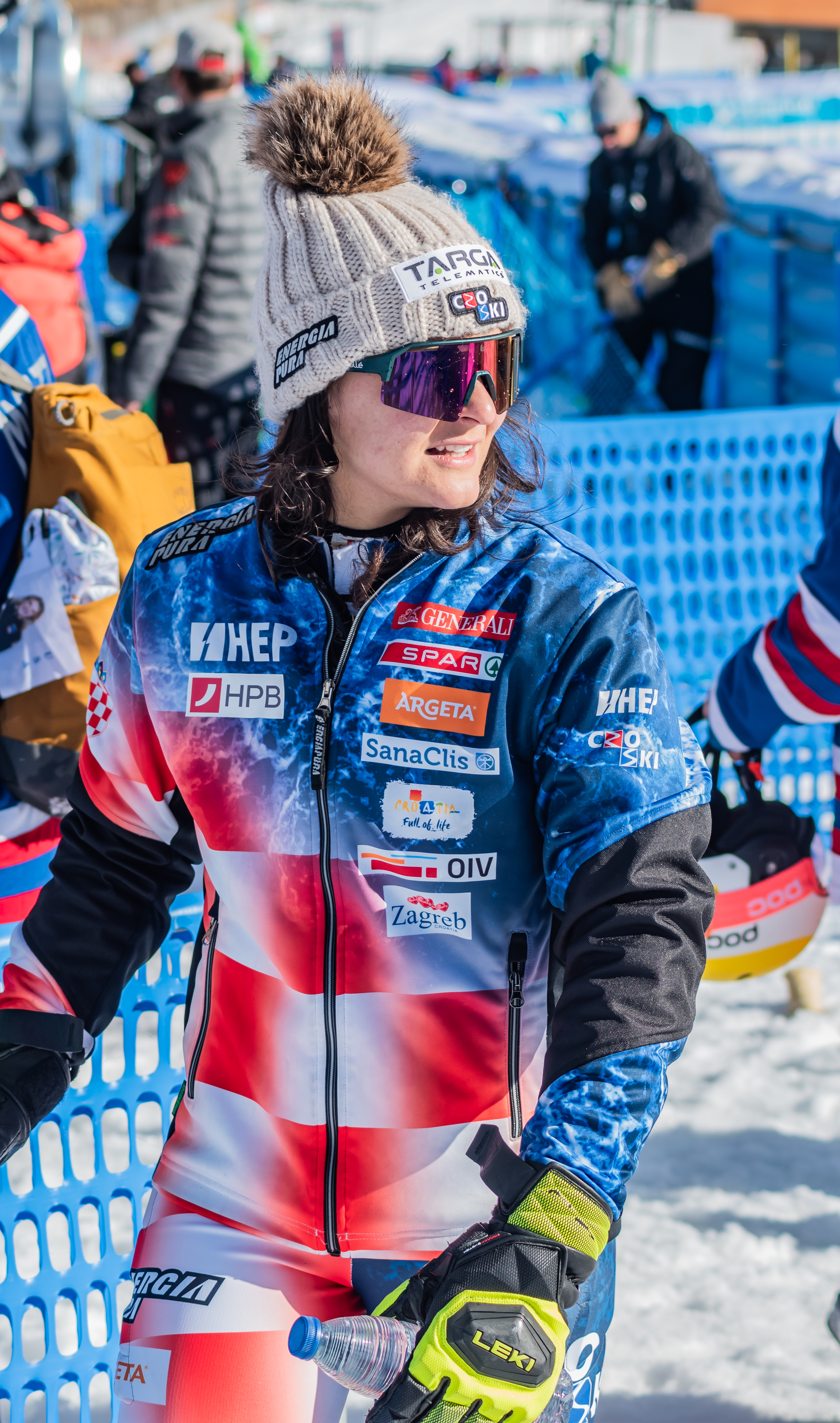
- Ljutić in 2024

Personal information
- Born: 26 January 2004 (age 22) Zagreb, Croatia

Skiing career
- Country: Croatia
- Sport: Alpine skiing
- Club: HSK Žuti mačak
- Disciplines: Slalom, giant slalom
- World Cup debut: 29 December 2020 (age 16)

Olympics
- Teams: 2 – (2022, 2026)
- Medals: 0

World Championships
- Teams: 2 – (2023, 2025)
- Medals: 0

World Cup
- Seasons: 6 – (2021–2026)
- Wins: 3 – (3 SL)
- Podiums: 10 – (8 SL, 2 GS)
- Overall titles: 0 – (4th in 2025)
- Discipline titles: 1 – (SL, 2025)
Medal record
Women's alpine skiing
Representing Croatia
World Junior Championships
Gold medal – first place	2022 Panorama	Slalom
Bronze medal – third place	2022 Panorama	Giant slalom

Zrinka Ljutić (born 26 January 2004) is a Croatian World Cup alpine ski racer who specializes in the technical events of slalom and giant slalom. She made her World Cup debut at age 16 in December 2020 and competed at the 2022 and 2026 Winter Olympics.

In the 2022 World Cup season, Ljutić earned her first World Cup points and finished thirtieth in the slalom standings. Ljutić achieved a breakthrough in the 2025 season, scoring her first World Cup win in a slalom in Semmering in December 2024 before taking two more victories and going on to be crowned World Cup slalom champion.

== World Cup results ==
=== Season titles ===
- 1 title (1 Slalom)

Season	Discipline
2025	Slalom

=== Season standings ===
Season
Season	Age	Overall	Slalom	Giant slalom	Super-G	Downhill	Parallel
2022	18	81	30	—	—	—	—
2023	19	41	12	40	—	—	—N/a
2024	20	13	8	10	—	—	—N/a
2025	21	4	1st place, gold medalist(s)	8	—	—	—N/a
2026	22	27	23	9	—	—	—N/a
2027	23	4	4	11	—	—	—N/a

Standings through 16 November 2026

=== Race podiums ===
- 3 wins – (3 SL)
- 10 podiums – (8 SL, 2 GS); 36 top tens (22 SL, 13 GS)

Season
Season	Date	Location	Discipline	Place
2023	29 January 2023	(Czech Republic) Špindlerův Mlýn, Czech Republic	Slalom	3rd
2024	21 January 2024	Jasná, Slovakia	Slalom	2nd
2024	11 February 2024	Soldeu, Andorra	Slalom	2nd
2024	10 March 2024	Åre, Sweden	Slalom	2nd
2025	30 November 2024	Killington, United States	Giant slalom	2nd
2025	29 December 2024	Semmering, Austria	Slalom	1st
2025	5 January 2025	Kranjska Gora, Slovenia	Slalom	1st
2025	30 January 2025	Courchevel, France	Slalom	1st
2025	23 February 2025	Sestriere, Italy	Slalom	2nd
2026	6 December 2025	Tremblant, Canada	Giant slalom	2nd

== World Championship results ==
Year
Year	Age	Slalom	Giant slalom	Super-G	Downhill	Combined	Team combined	Parallel	Team event
2023	19	DNF2	17	—	—	—	—N/a	—	—
2025	21	9	8	—	—	—N/a	—	—N/a	—

== Olympic Games ==
Year
Year	Age	Slalom	Giant slalom	Super-G	Downhill	Combined	Team combined	Team event
2022	18	25	28	—	—	—	—N/a	—
2026	22	26	17	—	—	—N/a	—	—N/a

== Personal life ==
Her mother, Martina, is from Varaždin, while her father, Amir, was born in Bosnia and Herzegovina. She is Roman Catholic.
