= 2027 Alpine Skiing World Cup – Women's slalom =

Alpine ski discipline year standings

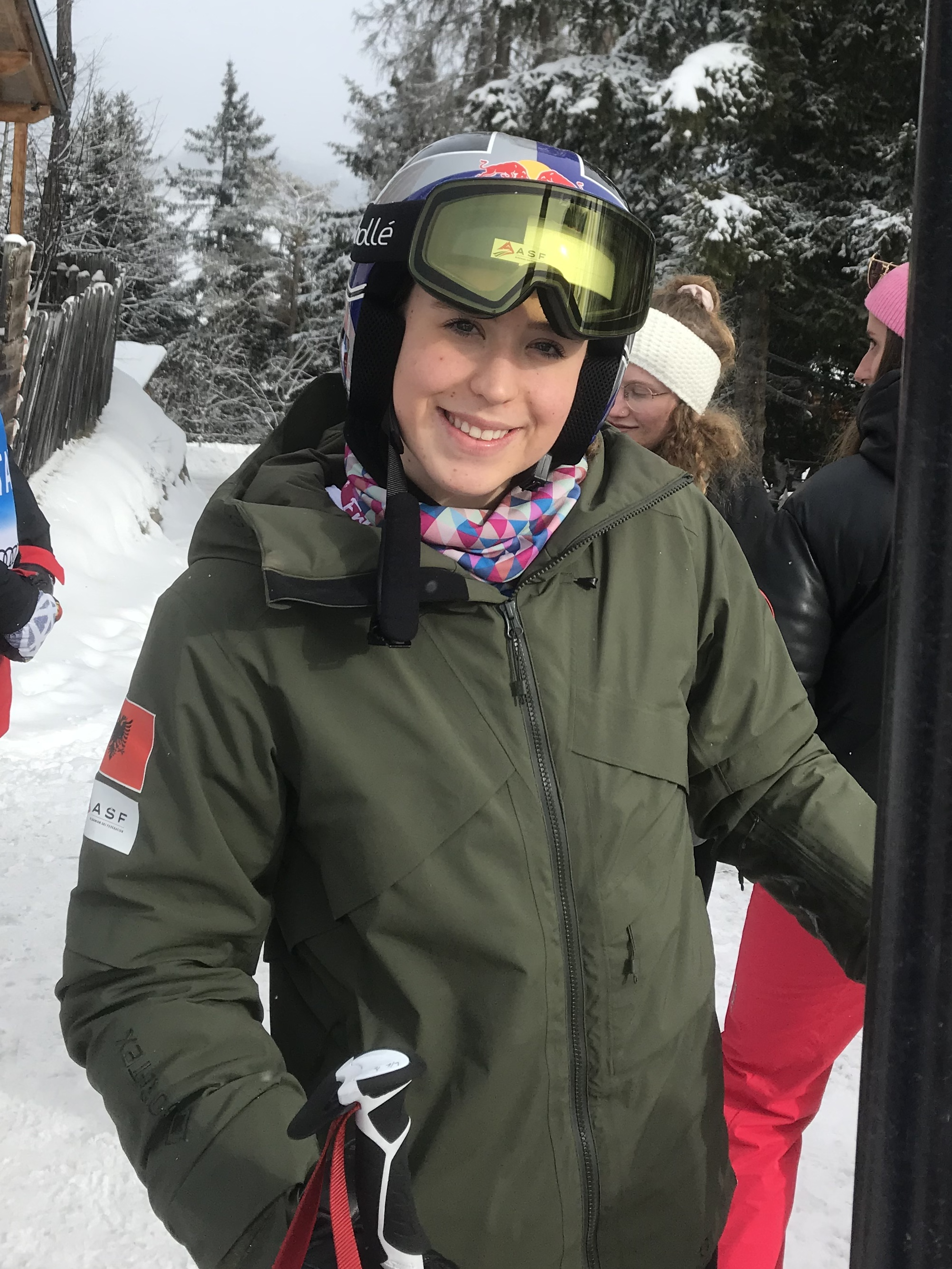
2027 Women's Slalom World Cup: Lara Colturi of Albania, current leader; 2027 Women's World Cup; Overall • Downhill • Super-G; Giant slalom • Slalom
Previous: 2026	Next: 2028

The women's slalom in the 2027 FIS Alpine Skiing World Cup is scheduled to consist of ten events, including the final. The season will begin with the traditional "reindeer" opening race in Levi, Finland on 14 November 2025, followed by a race the next week in Gurgl, Austria. After a year away, the women then return to Killington (USA) the next week, after which the remainder of the races will held in Europe until the final, including the first-ever World Cup race in Gosau (Dachstein West, Austria).. The finals, however, will return to North America.

The season champion for the ninth time in the discipline in 2026 was Mikaela Shiffrin of the U.S., who dominated by winning nine of the ten races held during the season, usually by striking margins (earning 980 points of a possible 1,000), and who clinched the season title before the end of January. However, before the start of this season, Shiffrin announced her intention to focus more on giant slalom and the speed disciplines during the season, thus skipping the two slaloms before Killington.

As is the case every odd-numbered year, the FIS Alpine World Ski Championships will take place, this time in Crans Montana, Switzerland during 1–14 February 2027.

== Season summary ==
In the season-opening slalom at Levi, German's all-event skier Emma Aicher drew the first starting time and then led after both legs to win, not only ending a 14-race string of Levi slaloms won by either Shiffrin (not competing) or Slovakia's Petra Vlhová (who finished 16th) but also earning her first-ever slalom victory (to join five wins in speed events) on the day after her 23rd birthday. The next week, in Gurgl (AUT), Lara Colturi of Albania, who had finished second to Aicher the week before, overtook Anna Swenn Larsson of Sweden on her second run to record her first World Cup victory and take over first place for the season both in the discipline and overall.

== Finals ==
The finals in women's slalom are scheduled to take place on Wednesday, 25 March 2027 in Sun Valley, Idaho, U.S. Only the top 25 skiers in each World Cup discipline and the winner of the 2027 FIS Junior World Championships in the discipline, plus any skiers who have scored at least 500 points in the World Cup overall classification for the season, will be eligible to compete in the final, and only the top 15 finishers will earn World Cup points.

== Standings ==
	Venue	14 Nov 2026; Levi	21 Nov 2026; Gurgl	29 Nov 2026; Killington	22 Dec 2026; Courchevel	29 Dec 2026; Gosau	5 Jan 2027; Flachau	24 Jan 2027; Jasná	30 Jan 2027; Kranjska Gora	13 Feb 2027; Crans Montana WC	7 Mar 2027; Soldeu	25 Mar 2027; Sun Valley	
#	Skier	(Finland)	(Austria)	(United States)	(France)	(Austria)	(Austria)	(Slovakia)	(Slovenia)	(Switzerland)	(Andorra)	(United States)	Total
1	(Albania) Lara Colturi	80	100										180
2	(Germany) Emma Aicher	100	32										132
3	(Sweden) Anna Swenn-Larsson	45	60										105
4	(Sweden) Sara Hector	20	80										100
5	(Croatia) Zrinka Ljutić	50	36										86
6	(Switzerland) Camille Rast	24	45										69
7	(United States) AJ Hurt	16	50										66
8	(France) Marion Chevrier	40	24										64
9	(Austria) Katharina Truppe	60	DNF2										60
10	(Sweden) Hanna Aronsson Elfman	4	45										49
11	(Latvia) Dženifera Ģērmane	22	26										48
12	(France) Marie Lamure	36	7										43
13	(Italy) Lara Della Mea	11	29										40
14	(Germany) Lena Dürr	13	22										35
15	(Australia) Madison Hoffman	32	DNQ										32
16	(Switzerland) Aline Höpli	18	12										30
17	(Austria) Katharina Huber	29	DNQ										29
18	(Slovenia) Neja Dvornik	14	13										27
19	(Switzerland) Wendy Holdener	26	DNF1										26
20	(France) Caitlin McFarlane	5	18										23
21	(United States) Paula Moltzan	DNF1	20										20
22	(Liechtenstein) Charlotte Lingg	10	9										19
23	(Switzerland) Selina Egloff	DNQ	16										16
24	(United States) Katie Hensien	DNQ	15										0
	(Slovakia) Petra Vlhová	15	DNS										15
26	(Switzerland) Eliane Christen	DNQ	14										14
27	(Italy) Beatrice Sola	12	DNS										12
28	(Czech Republic) Martina Dubovská	DNF2	11										11
29	(Sweden) Cornelia Öhlund	DNF2	10										10
30	(Canada) Laurence St-Germain	9	DNQ										9
31	(United States) Liv Moritz	DNQ	8										0
	(Austria) Valentina Rings-Wanner	8	DNQ										8
33	(Italy) Martina Peterlini	7	DNQ										7
34	(Austria) Franziska Gritsch	6	DNQ										6
35	(United States) Mikaela Shiffrin	DNS											0
	(United States) Nina O'Brien	DNF2	DNF2										0
	(Switzerland) Mélanie Meillard	DNS											0
	(Austria) Katharina Liensberger	DNS											0
	(Slovenia) Andreja Slokar	DNF1	DNQ										0
	(Austria) Katharina Gallhuber	DNS											0
	(Austria) Lisa Hörhager	DNQ	DNQ										0
	(Austria) Natalie Falch	DNQ	DNF2										0
	(Italy) Marta Rosetti	DNQ	DNQ										0
	(France) Clarisse Brèche	DNF1	DNQ										0
	(Italy) Emilia Mondinelli	DNF1	DNF2										0
	(Switzerland) Anuk Brändli	DNQ	DNS										0
	(Sweden) Estelle Alphand	DNS											0
	(Norway) Bianca Bakke Westhoff	DNQ	DNS										0
	(Italy) Anna Trocker	DNF1	DNF1										0
	(Norway) Thea Louise Stjernesund	DNS											0
	(Canada) Amelia Smart	DNQ	DNS										0
	(Switzerland) Aline Danioth	DNQ	DNQ										0
	(Norway) Mina Fürst Holtmann	DNF1	DNF1										0
	(Italy) Giulia Valleriani	DNQ	DNF2										0
	(Andorra) Carla Mijares Ruf	DNF1	DNQ										0
	(Switzerland) Nicole Good	DNQ	DNQ										0
	(Canada) Ali Nullmeyer	DNS	DNS										0
	(Germany) Jessica Hilzinger	DNQ	DNQ										0
	(Japan) Chisaki Maeda	DNF1	DNQ										0
	(Croatia) Leona Popović	DNS	DNQ										0
	(France) Doriane Escané	DNQ	DNQ										0
	(Slovenia) Nika Tomšič	DNQ	DNF2										0
	(Sweden) Moa Landström	DNF1	DNS										0
	(Hungary) Zita Tóth	DNQ	DNS										0
	(Canada) Justine Lamontagne	DNQ	DNF1										0
	(Finland) Rosa Pohjolainen	DNF1	DNS										0
	(Israel) Noa Szőllős	DNQ	DNS										0
	(Austria) Leonie Raich	DNF1	DNS										0
	(United States) Elisabeth Bocock	DNF1	DNS										0
	References												

=== Legend ===
- Winner (100 points)
- 2nd place (80 points)
- 3rd place (60 points)
- DNQ = Did not qualify for run 2
- DNF1 = Did not finish run 1
- DSQ1 = Disqualified run 1
- DNF2 = Did not finish run 2
- DSQ2 = Disqualified run 2
- DNS2 = Did not start run 2
- Did not start (DNS)
- Not eligible for finals (NE)
- Race canceled (x)
- FIS non-World Cup race (Olympics)
- R# = Rescheduled (make-up) race
- Updated on 21 November 2026, after two events.

== See also ==
- 2027 Alpine Skiing World Cup – Women's summary rankings
- 2027 Alpine Skiing World Cup – Women's overall
- 2027 Alpine Skiing World Cup – Women's downhill
- 2027 Alpine Skiing World Cup – Women's super-G
- 2027 Alpine Skiing World Cup – Women's giant slalom
- World Cup scoring system
