= FIS Alpine World Ski Championships 2021 – Women's giant slalom =

Women's giant slalom at the FIS Alpine World Ski Championships 2021
- Location: Cortina d'Ampezzo, Italy
- Date: 18 February
- Competitors: 98 from 43 nations
- Winning time: 2:30.66

Medalists
gold medal	Lara Gut-Behrami	Switzerland
silver medal	Mikaela Shiffrin	United States
bronze medal	Katharina Liensberger	Austria

Women's Giant Slalom
- Location: Olimpia delle Tofane; Cortina d'Ampezzo, Italy
- Vertical: 400 m (1,312 ft)
- Top elevation: 1,960 m (6,430 ft)
- Base elevation: 1,560 m (5,118 ft)

The Women's giant slalom competition at the FIS Alpine World Ski Championships 2021 was held on 18 February 2021.

== Results ==
The first run was started at 10:00 and the second run at 13:30.

Rank	Bib	Name	Nation	Run 1	Rank	Run 2	Rank	Total	Diff
1st place, gold medalist(s)	5	Lara Gut-Behrami	Switzerland	1:13.30	3	1:17.36	2	2:30.66	
2nd place, silver medalist(s)	7	Mikaela Shiffrin	United States	1:13.22	1	1:17.46	4	2:30.68	+0.02
3rd place, bronze medalist(s)	10	Katharina Liensberger	Austria	1:13.48	4	1:17.27	1	2:30.75	+0.09
4	13	Alice Robinson	New Zealand	1:13.73	6	1:17.66	5	2:31.39	+0.73
5	12	Ramona Siebenhofer	Austria	1:14.53	14	1:17.39	3	2:31.92	+1.26
6	18	Maryna Gąsienica-Daniel	Poland	1:13.79	7	1:18.40	12	2:32.19	+1.53
7	6	Tessa Worley	France	1:14.14	9	1:18.16	8	2:32.30	+1.64
8	14	Wendy Holdener	Switzerland	1:14.47	13	1:17.87	6	2:32.34	+1.68
9	17	Ragnhild Mowinckel	Norway	1:13.97	8	1:18.39	11	2:32.36	+1.70
10	19	Nina O'Brien	United States	1:13.24	2	1:19.22	18	2:32.46	+1.80
11	1	Michelle Gisin	Switzerland	1:13.56	5	1:18.91	15	2:32.47	+1.81
12	3	Petra Vlhová	Slovakia	1:14.39	11	1:18.17	9	2:32.56	+1.90
13	2	Marta Bassino	Italy	1:14.76	15	1:18.18	10	2:32.94	+2.28
14	23	Coralie Frasse Sombet	France	1:15.63	22	1:17.88	7	2:33.51	+2.85
15	24	Tina Robnik	Slovenia	1:15.06	16	1:18.95	16	2:34.01	+3.35
16	26	Kristin Lysdahl	Norway	1:14.45	12	1:19.65	22	2:34.10	+3.44
17	28	Alex Tilley	Great Britain	1:15.30	19	1:19.42	19	2:34.72	+4.06
18	32	Corinne Suter	Switzerland	1:15.26	18	1:19.54	21	2:34.80	+4.14
19	39	Magdalena Łuczak	Poland	1:16.29	25	1:18.79	13	2:35.08	+4.42
20	30	Andrea Filser	Germany	1:16.30	26	1:18.79	13	2:35.09	+4.43
21	31	Neja Dvornik	Slovenia	1:16.38	27	1:19.18	17	2:35.56	+4.90
22	9	Mina Fürst Holtmann	Norway	1:16.08	23	1:19.91	24	2:35.99	+5.33
23	40	Cassidy Gray	Canada	1:16.83	29	1:19.43	20	2:36.26	+5.60
24	25	Estelle Alphand	Sweden	1:15.53	21	1:20.85	27	2:36.38	+5.72
25	41	Leona Popović	Croatia	1:16.82	28	1:19.71	23	2:36.53	+5.87
26	45	Laura Pirovano	Italy	1:17.12	30	1:20.05	25	2:37.17	+6.51
27	43	Charlotte Lingg	Liechtenstein	1:17.75	36	1:20.58	26	2:38.33	+7.67
28	35	Doriane Escané	France	1:17.29	31	1:21.59	29	2:38.88	+8.22
29	44	Erika Pykäläinen	Finland	1:17.61	34	1:21.37	28	2:38.98	+8.32
30	46	Francesca Baruzzi	Argentina	1:17.41	33	1:23.07	30	2:40.48	+9.82
31	47	Ekaterina Tkachenko	Russian Ski Federation	1:18.54	38	1:23.42	31	2:41.96	+11.30
32	51	Noa Szőllős	Israel	1:19.24	39	1:24.90	33	2:44.14	+13.48
33	53	Nino Tsiklauri	Georgia	1:19.37	40	1:25.19	34	2:44.56	+13.90
34	75	Katla Björg Dagbjartsdóttir	Iceland	1:20.71	41	1:24.14	32	2:44.85	+14.19
35	58	Hólmfríður Dóra Friðgeirsdóttir	Iceland	1:22.39	43	1:26.98	35	2:49.37	+18.71
36	57	Anastasiya Shepilenko	Ukraine	1:21.36	42	1:28.18	38	2:49.54	+18.88
37	61	Eva Vukadinova	Bulgaria	1:22.73	44	1:27.20	36	2:49.93	+19.27
38	60	Tess Arbez	Ireland	1:24.28	46	1:27.66	37	2:51.94	+21.28
39	68	Maria-Eleni Tsiovolou	Greece	1:23.80	45	1:28.21	39	2:52.01	+21.35
40	71	Kateryna Pyrozhko	Ukraine	1:24.92	47	1:30.60	41	2:55.52	+24.86
41	54	Sarah Schleper	Mexico	1:26.77	51	1:29.47	40	2:56.24	+25.58
42	72	Maria Ioana Constantin	Romania	1:25.80	49	1:31.38	42	2:57.18	+26.52
43	62	Hanna Majtényi	Hungary	1:25.86	50	1:31.44	43	2:57.30	+26.64
44	80	Nikolina Dragoljević	Bosnia and Herzegovina	1:28.58	53	1:35.81	45	3:04.39	+33.73
45	90	Carlie Maria Iskandar	Lebanon	1:32.98	57	1:35.02	44	3:08.00	+37.34
46	81	Atefeh Ahmadi	Iran	1:31.65	55	1:38.68	46	3:10.33	+39.67
47	89	Georgia Epiphaniou	Cyprus	1:32.75	56	1:39.38	47	3:12.13	+41.47
48	74	Helēna Ērenpreisa	Latvia	1:34.02	58	1:39.74	48	3:13.76	+43.10
49	64	Katalin Dorultán	Hungary	1:35.39	60	1:40.53	49	3:15.92	+45.26
50	79	Karlīna Hedviga Grāmatniece	Latvia	1:34.28	59	1:45.64	50	3:19.92	+49.26
	8	Sara Hector	Sweden	1:15.46	20	Did not finish			
	11	Meta Hrovat	Slovenia	1:14.34	10	Did not finish			
	15	Stephanie Brunner	Austria	1:15.17	17	Did not finish			
	37	Riikka Honkanen	Finland	1:17.86	37	Did not finish			
	42	Núria Pau	Spain	1:16.16	24	Did not finish			
	66	Sigríður Dröfn Auðunsdóttir	Iceland	1:25.27	48	Did not finish			
	67	Kateryna Shepilenko	Ukraine	1:27.78	52	Did not finish			
	73	Tetiana Knopova	Ukraine	1:29.76	54	Did not finish			
	16	Elena Curtoni	Italy	1:17.33	32	Did not start			
	29	Thea Louise Stjernesund	Norway	1:17.63	35	Did not start			
	88	Thaleia Armeni	Cyprus	1:35.51	61	Did not qualify			
	91	Emīlija Anna Škapare	Latvia	1:36.04	62	Did not qualify			
	87	Forough Abbasi	Iran	1:36.80	63	Did not qualify			
	82	Karolina Photiades	Cyprus	1:38.16	64	Did not qualify			
	92	Naya Kurdi	Lebanon	1:38.46	65	Did not qualify			
	99	Anastasia Ferenidou	Greece	1:39.97	66	Did not qualify			
	85	Maria Abou Jaoude	Lebanon	1:41.37	67	Did not qualify			
	95	Tamara Popović	Montenegro	1:44.63	68	Did not qualify			
	97	Aanchal Thakur	India	2:08.23	69	Did not qualify			
	98	Celine Marti	Haiti	2:16.60	70	Did not qualify			
	4	Federica Brignone	Italy	Did not finish					
	20	Ana Bucik	Slovenia	Did not finish					
	21	Franziska Gritsch	Austria	Did not finish					
	22	Valérie Grenier	Canada	Did not finish					
	27	Paula Moltzan	United States	Did not finish					
	33	AJ Hurt	United States	Did not finish					
	34	Piera Hudson	New Zealand	Did not finish					
	36	Asa Ando	Japan	Did not finish					
	38	Andrea Komšić	Croatia	Did not finish					
	48	Miho Mizutani	Japan	Did not finish					
	49	Kim Vanreusel	Belgium	Did not finish					
	50	Dženifera Ģērmane	Latvia	Did not finish					
	52	Zita Tóth	Hungary	Did not finish					
	55	Petra Hromcová	Slovakia	Did not finish					
	56	Sara Roggeman	Belgium	Did not finish					
	63	Axelle Mollin	Belgium	Did not finish					
	65	Maria Shkanova	Belarus	Did not finish					
	69	Maja Tadić	Bosnia and Herzegovina	Did not finish					
	70	Esma Alić	Bosnia and Herzegovina	Did not finish					
	76	Jelena Vujičić	Montenegro	Did not finish					
	78	Manon Ouaiss	Lebanon	Did not finish					
	83	Fani Marmarelli	Greece	Did not finish					
	84	Sadaf Saveh Shemshaki	Iran	Did not finish					
	86	Ariadni Oettli	Greece	Did not finish					
	93	Fiona Rusta	Kosovo	Did not finish					
	94	Ornella Oettl Reyes	Peru	Did not finish					
	96	Marjan Kalhor	Iran	Did not finish					
	77	Hjördís Birna Ingvadóttir	Iceland	Disqualified					
	59	Vanina Guerillot	Portugal	Did not start					
