= FIS Alpine World Ski Championships 2021 – Women's alpine combined =

Women's alpine combined at the FIS Alpine World Ski Championships 2021
- Location: Cortina d'Ampezzo, Italy
- Date: 15 February 2021
- Competitors: 33 from 17 nations
- Winning time: 2:07.22

Medalists
gold medal	Mikaela Shiffrin	United States
silver medal	Petra Vlhová	Slovakia
bronze medal	Michelle Gisin	Switzerland

Women's Combined (Super-G)
- Location: Olimpia delle Tofane; Cortina d'Ampezzo, Italy
- Vertical: 600 m (1,969 ft)
- Top elevation: 2,160 m (7,087 ft)
- Base elevation: 1,560 m (5,118 ft)
- Longest run: 2.150 km (1.34 mi)

Women's Combined (Slalom)
- Location: Olimpia delle Tofane; Cortina d'Ampezzo, Italy
- Vertical: 180 m (591 ft)
- Top elevation: 1,740 m (5,709 ft)
- Base elevation: 1,560 m (5,118 ft)

The Women's alpine combined competition at the FIS Alpine World Ski Championships 2021 was scheduled for 8 February, but due to heavy snow that day it was postponed a full week to 15 February 2021.

== Results ==
The super-G was started at 09:45, and the slalom at 14:10.

Rank	Bib	Name	Country	Super-G	Rank	Slalom	Rank	Total	Diff
1st place, gold medalist(s)	28	Mikaela Shiffrin	United States	1:22.17	3	45.05	1	2:07.22	—
2nd place, silver medalist(s)	26	Petra Vlhová	Slovakia	1:22.51	7	45.57	2	2:08.08	+0.86
3rd place, bronze medalist(s)	15	Michelle Gisin	Switzerland	1:22.37	5	45.74	3	2:08.11	+0.89
4	17	Elena Curtoni	Italy	1:22.12	2	47.45	5	2:09.57	+2.35
5	13	Ramona Siebenhofer	Austria	1:23.18	15	46.85	4	2:10.03	+2.81
6	3	Marta Bassino	Italy	1:23.01	12	47.75	7	2:10.76	+3.54
7	4	Laura Gauché	France	1:23.29	16	47.57	6	2:10.86	+3.64
8	5	Ester Ledecká	Czech Republic	1:22.27	4	49.07	10	2:11.34	+4.12
9	1	Ragnhild Mowinckel	Norway	1:22.58	8	49.57	13	2:12.15	+4.93
10	19	Maruša Ferk	Slovenia	1:22.78	9	49.48	12	2:12.26	+5.04
11	11	Franziska Gritsch	Austria	1:23.49	20	49.13	11	2:12.62	+5.40
12	31	Maryna Gąsienica-Daniel	Poland	1:24.20	23	48.83	9	2:13.03	+5.81
13	24	Katharina Huber	Austria	1:26.08	30	48.30	8	2:14.38	+7.16
14	33	Isabella Wright	United States	1:23.44	18	51.18	14	2:14.62	+7.40
15	21	Greta Small	Australia	1:24.76	25	51.41	15	2:16.17	+8.95
16	25	Elvedina Muzaferija	Bosnia and Herzegovina	1:24.80	26	51.41	15	2:16.21	+8.99
	7	Federica Brignone	Italy	1:22.11	1	Did not finish			
	23	Kajsa Vickhoff Lie	Norway	1:22.43	6	Did not finish			
	16	Jasmina Suter	Switzerland	1:22.78	9	Did not finish			
	20	Marie-Michèle Gagnon	Canada	1:22.79	11	Did not finish			
	10	Valérie Grenier	Canada	1:23.02	13	Did not finish			
	9	Wendy Holdener	Switzerland	1:23.08	14	Did not finish			
	22	Meta Hrovat	Slovenia	1:23.39	17	Did not finish			
	6	Priska Nufer	Switzerland	1:23.47	19	Did not finish			
	8	Ariane Rädler	Austria	1:23.51	21	Did not finish			
	30	Estelle Alphand	Sweden	1:24.05	22	Did not finish			
	32	AJ Hurt	United States	1:24.71	24	Did not finish			
	18	Nevena Ignjatović	Serbia	1:25.05	27	Did not finish			
	14	Tifany Roux	France	1:25.55	28	Did not finish			
	29	Francesca Baruzzi	Argentina	1:25.92	29	Did not finish			
	2	Nadia Delago	Italy	Did not finish					
	12	Breezy Johnson	United States	Did not finish					
	34	Noa Szőllős	Israel	Did not finish					
	27	Julia Pleshkova	Russian Ski Federation	Did not start					
