= 2024 Alpine Skiing World Cup – Women's giant slalom =

Alpine ski discipline year standings

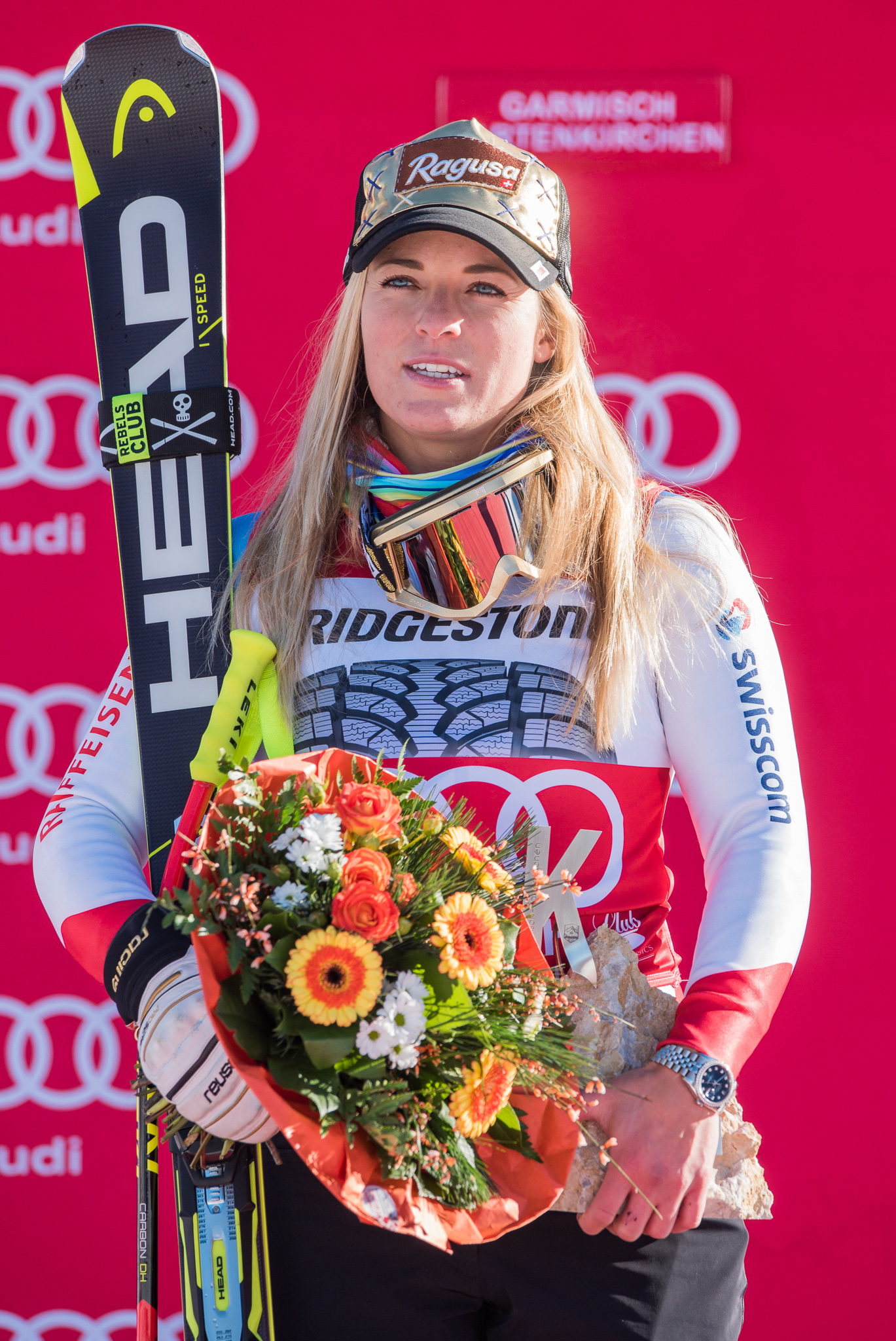
2024 Women's Giant Slalom World Cup: Lara Gut-Behrami of Switzerland, season champion; 2024 Women's World Cup; Overall • Downhill • Super-G; Giant slalom • Slalom
Previous: 2023	Next: 2025

The women's giant slalom in the 2024 FIS Alpine Skiing World Cup included eleven events, including the final. The season opened in Sölden, Austria on 28 October 2023. After an injury to defending champion Mikaela Shiffrin of the United States, the season championship became a battle between Lara Gut-Behrami of Switzerland and Federica Brignone of Italy, which went down to the last race of the season at the finals in Saalbach-Hinterglemm, Austria before Gut-Behrami triumphed.

== Season summary ==
The opening race in Sölden was won by Gut-Behrami, who finished in second place in the discipline last season (her best-ever season finish in the GS discipline). Gut-Behrami followed up that victory by winning the second race in Killington as well. However, both of the next two races in Tremblant, Canada (Quebec) were won by 2020 discipline champion Brignone, who thus moved into second, narrowly behind Gut-Behrami, for the season, with defending discipline champion Shiffrin in third for both races and for the season.

Back in Europe after Christmas, Shiffrin won the giant slalom at Lienz for her 92nd career victory overall, with Brignone second and Gut-Behrami sixth, moving Brignone into the discipline lead by 35 points over her Swiss rival and 80 points over the American, with everyone else over 150 points behind. However, the first post-Christmas race in Kranjska Gora, Slovenia took place in pouring rain and slushy conditions and was won in an upset by Valérie Grenier of Canada, with Gut-Behrami gaining twenty points on Brignone and closing to just 15 points behind. The next race went into the Low Tatras of Slovakia, about 17km south of the hometown of former overall season champion and current discipline contender Petra Vlhová, but unfortunately featured Vlhová suffering a season-ending injury near the beginning of her opening run. Despite that, the race was won convincingly by Sweden's Sara Hector, with only Shiffrin and New Zealand's Alice Robinson finishing within four seconds of her combined time; meanwhile, sixth-place Gut-Behrami grabbed the overall discipline lead by 25 points over Brignone, who also failed to finish her first run.

With Shiffrin also out with an ligament sprain (which turned out to be serious enough that she never returned during the season), Gut-Behrami then blew out the field in Kronplatz, winning her third giant slalom of the season by over a second over Hector and Robinson and opening an 85-point lead over Brignone with only three events remaining. At the next race, a giant slalom in Soldeu, Andorra, Gut-Behrami won again, coming from ninth after the first run to edge Alice Robinson by one-one-hundredth of a second to virtually clinch her first career discipline title in giant slalom, with a 135-point lead over Brignone with just two races to go, and no one else still in contention. However, in the penultimate race at Åre, Brignone rallied from over a second down after the first run with the fastest time on the second run to win the race and remain alive for the championship at 95 points behind Gut-Behrami with just the finals remaining.

== Finals ==
The World Cup finals in the discipline took place on Sunday, 17 March 2024 in Saalbach-Hinterglemm, Austria. Only the top 25 skiers in the World Cup giant slalom discipline and the winner of the Junior World Championship in the discipline, plus any skiers who have scored at least 500 points in the World Cup overall classification for the season, were eligible to compete in the final, and only the top 15 earned World Cup points. In this race, the winner of the women's giant slalom Junior World Championship (Britt Richardson) was already eligible as one of the top 25 skiers in the discipline for the season (tied for 25th), and two skiers with at least 500 points who weren't otherwise eligible chose to compete (Michelle Gisin and Lena Dürr). Due to injuries, four qualifiers (Shiffrin, Vhlová, Grenier, and Sofia Goggia) did not compete, leaving a field of 24 skiers.

Because of the special scoring rules for the finals, the only way for Brignone to win the season title over Gut-Behrami involved two steps: (1) Brignone winning the final (worth 100 points), and (2) Gut-Behrami not finishing in the top 15 in the final (worth 0 points), giving Brignone a 5-point victory. Brignone lived up to her part of the challenge, winning the race almost a second and a half composite over Alice Robinson. However, skiing cautiously, Gut-Behrami finished the final in 10th (worth 26 points), giving her both her first discipline championship in giant slalom (by 21 points) and the overall season championship (208 points ahead and only 200 points remaining).

== Standings ==
	Venue	28 Oct 2023; Sölden	25 Nov 2023; Killington	2 Dec 2023; Tremblant	3 Dec 2023; Tremblant	28 Dec 2023; Lienz	6 Jan 2024; Kranjska Gora	20 Jan 2024; Jasná	30 Jan 2024; Kronplatz	10 Feb 2024; Soldeu	9 Mar 2024; Åre	17 Mar 2024; Saalbach	
#	Skier	(Austria)	(United States)	(Canada)	(Canada)	(Austria)	(Slovenia)	(Slovakia)	(Italy)	(Andorra)	(Sweden)	(Austria)	Total
	(Switzerland) Lara Gut-Behrami	100	100	45	80	40	80	40	100	100	60	26	771
2	(Italy) Federica Brignone	80	40	100	100	80	60	DNF1	40	50	100	100	750
3	(Sweden) Sara Hector	50	50	50	22	60	40	100	80	29	80	22	583
4	(New Zealand) Alice Robinson	29	80	22	DNF1	29	32	60	80	80	DNF1	80	492
5	(United States) Mikaela Shiffrin	40	60	60	60	100	29	80	DNS				429
6	(Canada) Valérie Grenier	36	45	32	40	50	100	24	DNS				327
7	(Norway) Thea Louise Stjernesund	4	7	29	6	11	45	45	10	45	45	60	307
8	(Slovakia) Petra Vlhová	60	26	80	45	36	50	DNF1	DNS				297
9	(Italy) Marta Bassino	45	DNF2	40	32	DNF1	26	DNQ	26	40	50	DNF2	259
10	(Croatia) Zrinka Ljutić	18	20	18	36	26	9	50	36	26	DNF2	0	239
11	(United States) Paula Moltzan	24	32	20	16	15	DNF2	15	24	24	26	40	236
12	(Austria) Julia Scheib	DNF1	36	11	DNF1	45	DNF2	DNQ	29	20	40	45	226
13	(Norway) Ragnhild Mowinckel	DSQ1	14	12	5	20	10	32	50	22	20	32	217
14	(Italy) Sofia Goggia	15	29	36	26	32	22	DNS	45	DNS			205
15	(United States) AJ Hurt	DNQ	12	DNF1	29	24	13	36	4	60	24	0	202
16	(France) Clara Direz	11	4	26	50	DNF2	24	9	9	DNF1	36	29	198
17	(Norway) Mina Fürst Holtmann	32	15	DNF1	9	18	8	7	DNF2	36	32	36	193
18	(Austria) Stephanie Brunner	18	11	15	20	DNQ	20	DNF1	12	8	22	50	176
19	(Austria) Franziska Gritsch	26	16	24	14	12	36	DNQ	DNQ	4	29	0	161
20	(Austria) Katharina Liensberger	8	24	15	24	DNQ	18	DNQ	6	7	DNF1	20	122
	(Switzerland) Camille Rast	2	DNQ	DNQ	DNQ	18	DNQ	29	32	16	9	16	122
22	(Albania) Lara Colturi	DNQ	22	DNQ	DNQ	9	6	20	22	DSQ2	12	24	115
23	(Poland) Maryna Gąsienica-Daniel	20	3	10	DNF1	22	15	DNQ	7	13	5	DNF2	95
24	(Austria) Ricarda Haaser	DNS	5	DNF2	DNQ	DNQ	15	DNF2	20	32	18	DNF2	90
25	(Switzerland) Michelle Gisin	12	18	DNQ	8	7	11	DNQ	DNS		14	18	88
26	(Slovenia) Ana Bucik	24	10	DNF1	4	8	DNF2	10	16	10	3	0	85
	(Canada) Britt Richardson	7	9	16	DNF1	DNF1	12	DNF1	13	18	10	0	85
28	(Austria) Elisabeth Kappaurer	13	DNF1	5	18	DNQ	DNQ	DNQ	14	DNF2	13	NE	63
	(Italy) Roberta Melesi	DNQ	DNQ	13	10	14	DNQ	DNQ	18	DNQ	8	NE	63
30	(Italy) Elisa Platino	DNQ	DNQ	DNF2	11	6	5	16	5	15	2	NE	60
	(Switzerland) Simone Wild	11	6	9	DNQ	DNS		14	11	5	4	NE	60
32	(Slovenia) Neja Dvornik	DNF1	DNQ	DNQ	DNQ	13	DNQ	13	DNQ	14	15	NE	55
33	(Poland) Magdalena Luczak	1	14	DNQ	3	11	7	4	DNF2	12	DNS	NE	52
34	(Norway) Kajsa Vickhoff Lie	DNS						26	8	11	DNF1	NE	45
35	(Italy) Asja Zenere	3	DNQ	DNQ	DNQ	6	DNF1	12	15	DNF1	6	NE	42
36	(Switzerland) Mélanie Meillard	14	DNQ	DNF1	DNQ	3	DNQ	20	DNQ	DNQ	DNS	NE	37
37	(Norway) Kristin Lysdahl	DNQ	DNQ	6	13	DNQ	DNQ	DNQ	DNQ	6	11	NE	36
38	(Canada) Cassidy Gray	DNQ	DNQ	7	7	DNQ	DNF2	DNQ	DNQ	3	16	NE	33
39	(Germany) Emma Aicher	DNQ	DNQ	DNF1	15	DNQ	16	DNF1	DNS	DNQ	DNQ	NE	31
40	(Sweden) Lisa Nyberg	DNQ	DNQ	DNQ	DNQ	DNQ	DNQ	22	DNQ	DNQ	DNQ	NE	22
41	(Switzerland) Wendy Holdener	9	8	4	DNQ	DNS						NE	21
42	(Sweden) Estelle Alphand	5	2	DNQ	DNQ	DNQ	DNQ	DNF1	DNQ	9	DNQ	NE	16
43	(Austria) Katharina Truppe	7	DNQ	8	DNQ	DNQ	DNQ	DNQ	DNQ	DNQ	DNQ	NE	15
44	(Sweden) Hilma Lövblom	DNF1	DNQ	DNQ	12	DNF1	DNQ	DNQ	DNF1	DNQ	DNQ	NE	12
45	(Switzerland) Jasmina Suter	DNS						11	DNQ	DNQ	DNF1	NE	11
46	(Czech Republic) Adriana Jelinkova	DNQ	DNQ	DNQ	2	4	DNQ	3	DNQ	DNQ	DNQ	NE	9
	(Germany) Lena Dürr	DNS						2	DNS		7	0	9
48	(France) Caitlin McFarlane	DNS				DNQ	DNQ	8	DNQ	DNQ	DNS	NE	8
49	(Italy) Lara Della Mea	DNS				2	DNQ	5	DNQ	DNF1	DNF1	NE	7
50	(Norway) Marte Monsen	DNS				DNQ	DNQ	6	DNQ	DNS	DNQ	NE	6
51	(Finland) Erika Pykalainen	DNQ	DNF1	DNQ	1	DNQ	DNQ	DNQ	DNQ	DNF1	DNS	NE	1
	References												

=== Legend ===
- Winner (100 points)
- 2nd place (80 points)
- 3rd place (60 points)
- DNQ = Did not qualify for run 2
- DNF1 = Did not finish run 1
- DSQ1 = Disqualified run 1
- DNF2 = Did not finish run 2
- DSQ2 = Disqualified run 2
- DNS2 = Did not start run 2
- Did not start (DNS)
- Not eligible for finals (NE)
- Race canceled (x)
- Updated at 17 March 2024, after all events.

== See also ==
- 2024 Alpine Skiing World Cup – Women's summary rankings
- 2024 Alpine Skiing World Cup – Women's overall
- 2024 Alpine Skiing World Cup – Women's downhill
- 2024 Alpine Skiing World Cup – Women's super-G
- 2024 Alpine Skiing World Cup – Women's slalom
- World Cup scoring system
