= FIS Alpine World Ski Championships 2019 – Nations team event =

Nations team event at the FIS Alpine World Ski Championships 2019
- Venue: Åre ski resort
- Location: Åre, Sweden
- Dates: 12 February
- Competitors: 96 from 16 nations
- Teams: 16

Medalists
gold medal	Aline Danioth; Andrea Ellenberger; Wendy Holdener; Sandro Simonet; Daniel Yule; Ramon Zenhäusern	Switzerland
silver medal	Franziska Gritsch; Christian Hirschbühl; Katharina Liensberger; Michael Matt; Marco Schwarz; Katharina Truppe	Austria
bronze medal	Marta Bassino; Irene Curtoni; Lara Della Mea; Simon Maurberger; Riccardo Tonetti; Alex Vinatzer	Italy

Nations Team Event
- Location: Olympia; Åre, Sweden
- Vertical: 82 m (269 ft)
- Top elevation: 478 m (1,568 ft)
- Base elevation: 396 m (1,299 ft)

The Nations team event competition at the FIS Alpine World Ski Championships 2019 was held on 12 February 2019.

== FIS Overall Nations Cup standings ==
The participating nations were seeded according to the overall nations cup standings prior to the World Championships.

Rank	Country	Points
1	Austria	8895
2	Switzerland	5422
3	France	4093
4	Italy	3926
5	Norway	3890
6	United States	2874
7	Germany	2102
8	Sweden	1747
9	Slovenia	1339
10	Slovakia	1078
11	Canada	1037
12	Liechtenstein	370
13	Great Britain	282
14	Croatia	249
15	Czech Republic	150
16	Russia	117
17	Bulgaria	95
18	Finland	31
19	Poland	28
20	Japan	17
21	Belgium	13
22	South Korea	11
23	New Zealand	5
—	Argentina	0

== Bracket ==
In case of a tie, the single times of the fastest men and women would determine the winning team.

Round of 16
Austria	4
Argentina	0
Slovenia	2
Slovakia	2
Norway	4
Czech Republic	0
Italy	3
Finland	1
France	3
Russia	1
Germany	3
Great Britain	1
Sweden	3
Canada	1
Switzerland	4
Belgium	0

Quarterfinals
Austria	4
Slovakia	0
Norway	1
Italy	3
France	1
Germany	3
Sweden	2
Switzerland	2

Semifinals
Austria	2
Italy	2
Germany	2
Switzerland	2

Final
Austria	2
Switzerland	2
Third place
Italy	3
Germany	1
