= Doriane Escané =

French alpine skier (born 1999)

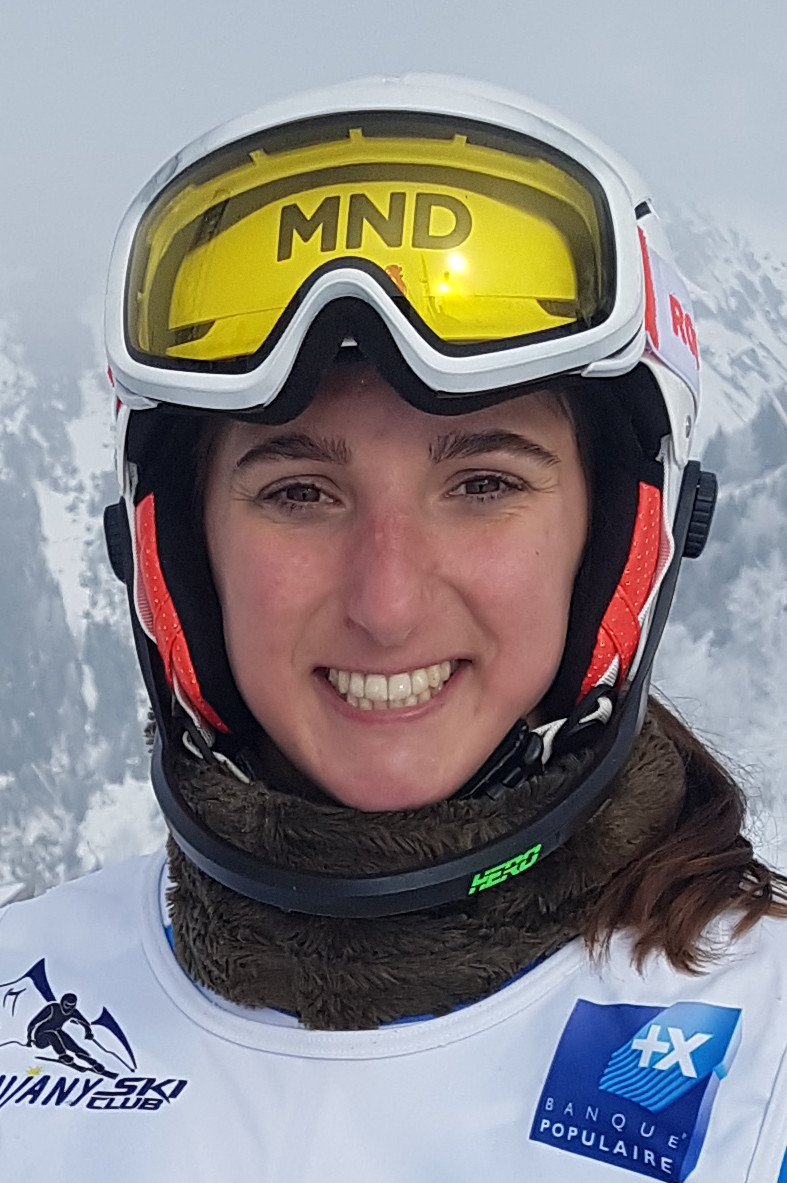
- Escané in 2023

Personal information
- Born: 8 January 1999 (age 27) Perpignan, Pyrénées-Orientales, France

Skiing career
- Country: France
- Sport: Alpine skiing
- Disciplines: slalom, giant slalom

Olympics
- Teams: 1 – (2026)
- Medals: 0

World Championships
- Teams: 3 – (2019, 2021, 2023)
- Medals: 0

Doriane Escané (born 8 January 1999 in Perpignan) is a French alpine skier. She competed for France at the 2026 Winter Olympics.

Escané competes in giant slalom and slalom races, and she has achieved several top three finishes in giant slalom at the Europa Cup; however, her career has been interrupted by knee injuries. She expressed disappointment with her 22nd-place finish in the giant slalom race at the Olympics.

== World Championship results ==
Year
Year	Age	Slalom	Giant slalom	Parallel giant slalom	Team event
2019	20	—	—	—	5
2021	22	DNF	28	38	–
2023	24	DNF	—	—	–

== Olympics results ==
Year
Year	Age	Slalom	Giant slalom
2026	27	DNF	22
