= 2026–27 FIS Alpine Ski World Cup =

International skiing competition

Discipline	Men	Women
Overall	(Brazil) Lucas Pinheiro Braathen	(Albania) Lara Colturi
Giant slalom	(Brazil) Lucas Pinheiro Braathen	(United States) Paula Moltzan
Slalom	(Norway) Timon Haugan	(Albania) Lara Colturi
Nations Cup	Norway	Sweden
- Nations Cup Overall: Switzerland

Competition
Edition	61st	61st
Individual	43	40

The 2026–27 FIS Alpine Ski World Cup is the current 61st season of the World Cup, the highest level of international alpine skiing competition for both men and women, organised by International Ski Federation (FIS).

Highlight of the season will be FIS Alpine World Ski Championships in Crans-Montana, Switzerland, held between 1 and 14 February 2027.

There are 12 giant slaloms for women scheduled in this season, which is World Cup all-time record, both men and women.

The season sees a slight re-distribution of prize money for all Top 30 competitors, with rounded numbers (the second season in a row in euros (€).

== Men ==
The number of races in the World Cup history

Total	DH	SG	GS	SL	AC	PS	PG	CE	K.O.	Winners
2001	549	260	476	562	134	2	8	10	1	320

after SL in Levi (15 November 2026)

=== Calendar ===
Event key: DH – Downhill, SL – Slalom, GS – Giant slalom, SG – Super giant slalom
All	No.	Date	Venue (slope %)	Type	Winner	Second	Third	Overall	R.
2001	1	25 October 2026	(Austria) Sölden (Rettenbach 68.2%)	GS _{476}	(Brazil) Lucas Pinheiro Braathen	(Switzerland) Loïc Meillard	(Switzerland) Marco Odermatt	(Brazil) Lucas Pinheiro Braathen	
2002	2	15 November 2026	(Finland) Levi (Levi Black 52%)	SL _{562}	(Brazil) Lucas Pinheiro Braathen	(France) Clément Noël	(Switzerland) Loïc Meillard	(Brazil) Lucas Pinheiro Braathen	
2003	3	22 November 2026	(Austria) Gurgl (Kirchenkar 60%)	SL _{563}	(Norway) Timon Haugan	(Norway) Eirik Hystad Solberg	(Switzerland) Tanguy Nef	(Brazil) Lucas Pinheiro Braathen	
2004	4	28 November 2026	(United States) Copper Mountain (West Encore / Rosi 46%)	SG _{261}					
2005	5	29 November 2026	(United States) Copper Mountain (West Encore / Rosi 46%)	GS _{477}					
2006	6	3 December 2026	(United States) Beaver Creek (Birds of Prey 68%)	DH _{550}					
2007	7	4 December 2026	(United States) Beaver Creek (Birds of Prey 68%)	DH _{551}					
2008	8	5 December 2026	(United States) Beaver Creek (Birds of Prey 68%)	SG _{262}					
2009	9	6 December 2026	(United States) Beaver Creek (Birds of Prey 68%)	GS _{478}					
2010	10	12 December 2026	(France) Val d'Isere (La face de Bellevarde 71%)	GS _{479}					
2011	11	13 December 2026	(France) Val d'Isere (La face de Bellevarde 71%)	SL _{564}					
2012	12	18 December 2026	(Italy) Val Gardena/Gröden (Saslong 56.9%)	SG _{263}					
2013	13	19 December 2026	(Italy) Val Gardena/Gröden (Saslong 56.9%)	DH _{552}					
2014	14	20 December 2026	(Italy) Alta Badia (Gran Risa 69%)	GS _{480}					
2015	15	21 December 2026	(Italy) Alta Badia (Gran Risa 69%)	SL _{565}					
2016	16	23 December 2026	(Italy) Madonna di Campiglio (Canalone Miramonti 60%)	SL _{566}					
2017	17	28 December 2026	(Italy) Bormio (Stelvio 63%)	DH _{553}					
2018	18	29 December 2026	(Italy) Bormio (Stelvio 63%)	SG _{264}					
2019	19	2 January 2027	(Slovenia) Kranjska Gora (Podkoren 3 59%)	GS _{481}					
2020	20	3 January 2027	(Slovenia) Kranjska Gora (Podkoren 3 59%)	SL _{567}					
2021	21	9 January 2027	(Switzerland) Adelboden (Chuenisbärgli 60%)	GS _{482}					
2022	22	10 January 2027	(Switzerland) Adelboden (Chuenisbärgli 60%)	SL _{568}					
2023	23	15 January 2027	(Switzerland) Wengen (Lauberhorn 90% – Speed) (Männlichen 72% – SL)	SG _{265}					
2024	24	16 January 2027	(Switzerland) Wengen (Lauberhorn 90% – Speed) (Männlichen 72% – SL)	DH _{554}					
2025	25	17 January 2027	(Switzerland) Wengen (Lauberhorn 90% – Speed) (Männlichen 72% – SL)	SL _{569}					
2026	26	22 January 2027	(Austria) Kitzbühel (Streif 85% – Speed) (Ganslern 70% – Technical)	SG _{266}					
2027	27	23 January 2027	(Austria) Kitzbühel (Streif 85% – Speed) (Ganslern 70% – Technical)	DH _{555}					
2028	28	24 January 2027	(Austria) Kitzbühel (Streif 85% – Speed) (Ganslern 70% – Technical)	SL _{570}					
2029	29	26 January 2027	(Austria) Schladming (Planai 54%)	GS _{483}					
2030	30	27 January 2027	(Austria) Schladming (Planai 54%)	SL _{571}					
2031	31	30 January 2027	(France) Chamonix (La Verte des Houches)	SL _{572}					
FIS Alpine World Ski Championships 2027 (1 – 14 February • (Switzerland) Crans-Montana)
2032	32	20 February 2027	(Germany) Garmisch-Partenkirchen (Kandahar 2 92%)	DH _{556}					
2033	33	21 February 2027	(Germany) Garmisch-Partenkirchen (Kandahar 2 92%)	SG _{267}					
2034	34	27 February 2027	(Austria) Saalbach (Schneekristall 72%)	DH _{557}					
2035	35	28 February 2027	(Austria) Saalbach (Schneekristall 72%)	SG _{268}					
2036	36	6 March 2027	(Norway) Kvitfjell (Olympiabakken 64%)	DH _{558}					
2037	37	7 March 2027	(Norway) Kvitfjell (Olympiabakken 64%)	SG _{269}					
2038	38	13 March 2027	(Sweden) Åre (Störtloppsbacken 55%)	GS _{484}					
2039	39	14 March 2027	(Sweden) Åre (Störtloppsbacken 55%)	SL _{573}					
World Cup Season Final
2040	40	20 March 2027	(United States) Sun Valley (Challenger 55% – Speed) (Greyh./Heming. 56% – GS) (Greyhawk 38% – SL)	DH _{559}					
2041	41	21 March 2027	(United States) Sun Valley (Challenger 55% – Speed) (Greyh./Heming. 56% – GS) (Greyhawk 38% – SL)	SG _{270}					
2042	42	24 March 2027	(United States) Sun Valley (Challenger 55% – Speed) (Greyh./Heming. 56% – GS) (Greyhawk 38% – SL)	GS _{485}					
2043	43	25 March 2027	(United States) Sun Valley (Challenger 55% – Speed) (Greyh./Heming. 56% – GS) (Greyhawk 38% – SL)	SL _{574}					
61st FIS World Cup Overall (25 October 2026 – 25 March 2027)								Overall	

=== Standings ===
==== Overall ====
Rank	after 3 of 43 events	Points
1	(Brazil) Lucas Pinheiro Braathen	200
2	(Switzerland) Loïc Meillard	151
3	(Norway) Timon Haugan	113
4	(Norway) Eirik Hystad Solberg	112
5	(France) Clément Noël	104

==== Downhill ====
Rank	after 0 of 10 events	Points
1
2
3
4
5

==== Super-G ====
Rank	after 0 of 10 events	Points
1
2
3
4
5

==== Giant slalom ====
Rank	after 1 of 10 events	Points
1	(Brazil) Lucas Pinheiro Braathen	100
2	(Switzerland) Loïc Meillard	80
3	(Switzerland) Marco Odermatt	60
4	(United States) River Radamus	50
5	(Austria) Raphael Haaser	45

==== Slalom ====
Rank	after 2 of 13 events	Points
1	(Norway) Timon Haugan	113
2	(France) Clément Noël	104
3	(Brazil) Lucas Pinheiro Braathen	100
4	(Sweden) Fabian Ax Swartz	90
5	(Switzerland) Tanguy Nef	82

==== Prize money ====
Rank	after 2 of 43 payouts	euro (€)
1	(Brazil) Lucas Pinheiro Braathen	110,000
2	(Switzerland) Loïc Meillard	40,000
3	(France) Clément Noël	25,000
4	(Switzerland) Marco Odermatt	15,000
5	(Italy) Alex Vinatzer	14,000

== Women ==
The number of races in the World Cup history

Total	DH	SG	GS	SL	AC	PS	PG	CE	K.O.	Winners
1885	465	287	476	531	106	6	3	10	1	268

after SL in Gurgl (21 November 2026)

=== Calendar ===
Event key: DH – Downhill, SL – Slalom, GS – Giant slalom, SG – Super giant slalom
All	No.	Date	Venue (slope %)	Type	Winner	Second	Third	Overall	R.
1883	1	24 October 2026	(Austria) Sölden (Rettenbach 68.2%)	GS _{476}	(United States) Paula Moltzan	(Albania) Lara Colturi	(Germany) Emma Aicher	(United States) Paula Moltzan	
1884	2	14 November 2026	(Finland) Levi (Levi Black 52%)	SL _{530}	(Germany) Emma Aicher	(Albania) Lara Colturi	(Austria) Katharina Truppe	(Germany) Emma Aicher (Albania) Lara Colturi	
1885	3	21 November 2026	(Austria) Gurgl (Kirchenkar 60%)	SL _{531}	(Albania) Lara Colturi	(Sweden) Sara Hector	(Sweden) Anna Swenn-Larsson	(Albania) Lara Colturi	
1886	4	28 November 2026	(United States) Killington (Superstar 67%)	GS _{477}					
1887	5	29 November 2026	(United States) Killington (Superstar 67%)	SL _{532}					
1888	6	5 December 2026	(Canada) Tremblant (Flying Mile 42%)	GS _{478}					
1889	7	6 December 2026	(Canada) Tremblant (Flying Mile 42%)	GS _{479}					
1890	8	11 December 2026	(United States) Beaver Creek (Birds of Prey 68%)	DH _{466}					
1891	9	12 December 2026	(United States) Beaver Creek (Birds of Prey 68%)	DH _{467}					
1892	10	13 December 2026	(United States) Beaver Creek (Birds of Prey 68%)	SG _{288}					
1893	11	18 December 2026	(Switzerland) St. Moritz (Corviglia 61%)	SG _{289}					
1894	12	19 December 2026	(Switzerland) St. Moritz (Corviglia 61%)	SG _{290}					
1895	13	20 December 2026	(Switzerland) St. Moritz (Corviglia 61%)	GS _{480}					
1896	14	22 December 2026	(France) Courchevel (Stade Émile-Allais 58.5%)	SL _{533}					
1897	15	28 December 2026	(Austria) Gosau (TBD)	GS _{481}					
1898	16	29 December 2026	(Austria) Gosau (TBD)	SL _{534}					
1899	17	4 January 2027	(Austria) Flachau (Griessenkar 53%)	GS _{482}					
1900	18	5 January 2027	(Austria) Flachau (Griessenkar 53%)	SL _{535}					
1901	19	9 January 2027	(Italy) Val di Fassa (La Volata 57%)	DH _{468}					
1902	20	10 January 2027	(Italy) Val di Fassa (La Volata 57%)	SG _{291}					
1903	21	15 January 2027	(Italy) Cortina d'Ampezzo (Olimpia delle Tofane 73%)	DH _{469}					
1904	22	16 January 2027	(Italy) Cortina d'Ampezzo (Olimpia delle Tofane 73%)	DH _{470}					
1905	23	17 January 2027	(Italy) Cortina d'Ampezzo (Olimpia delle Tofane 73%)	SG _{292}					
1906	24	19 January 2027	(Italy) Kronplatz (Erta 61%)	GS _{483}					
1907	25	23 January 2027	(Slovakia) Jasná (Luková 2)	GS _{484}					
1908	26	24 January 2027	(Slovakia) Jasná (Luková 2)	SL _{536}					
1909	27	29 January 2027	(Slovenia) Kranjska Gora (Podkoren 3 59%)	GS _{485}					
1910	28	30 January 2027	(Slovenia) Kranjska Gora (Podkoren 3 59%)	SL _{537}					
FIS Alpine World Ski Championships 2027 (1 – 14 February • (Switzerland) Crans-Montana)
1911	29	20 February 2027	(Switzerland) Lenzerheide (Silvano Beltrametti 65%)	SG _{293}					
1912	30	21 February 2027	(Switzerland) Lenzerheide (Silvano Beltrametti 65%)	SG _{294}					
1913	31	27 February 2027	(Germany) Garmisch-Partenkirchen (Kandahar 2 92%)	DH _{471}					
1914	32	28 February 2027	(Germany) Garmisch-Partenkirchen (Kandahar 2 92%)	DH _{472}					
1915	33	6 March 2026	(Andorra) Soldeu (Avet 65%)	GS _{486}					
1916	34	7 March 2026	(Andorra) Soldeu (Avet 65%)	SL _{538}					
1917	35	12 March 2027	(Norway) Kvitfjell	DH _{473}					
1918	36	13 March 2027	(Norway) Kvitfjell	SG _{295}					
World Cup Season Final
1919	37	20 March 2027	(United States) Sun Valley (Challenger 55% – Speed) (Greyh./Hem. 56% – GS) (Greyhawk 38% – SL)	DH _{474}					
1920	38	21 March 2027	(United States) Sun Valley (Challenger 55% – Speed) (Greyh./Hem. 56% – GS) (Greyhawk 38% – SL)	SG _{296}					
1921	39	23 March 2027	(United States) Sun Valley (Challenger 55% – Speed) (Greyh./Hem. 56% – GS) (Greyhawk 38% – SL)	GS _{487}					
1922	40	25 March 2027	(United States) Sun Valley (Challenger 55% – Speed) (Greyh./Hem. 56% – GS) (Greyhawk 38% – SL)	SL _{539}					
61st FIS World Cup Overall (24 October 2026 – 25 March 2027)								Overall	

=== Standings ===
==== Overall ====
Rank	after 3 of 40 events	Points
1	(Albania) Lara Colturi	260
2	(Germany) Emma Aicher	192
3	(Sweden) Sara Hector	150
4	(United States) Paula Moltzan	120
5	(Croatia) Zrinka Ljutić	110

==== Downhill ====
Rank	after 0 of 9 events	Points
1
2
3
4
5

==== Super-G ====
Rank	after 0 of 9 events	Points
1
2
3
4
5

==== Giant slalom ====
Rank	after 1 of 12 events	Points
1	(United States) Paula Moltzan	100
2	(Albania) Lara Colturi	80
3	(Germany) Emma Aicher	60
4	(Sweden) Sara Hector	50
5	(Italy) Asja Zenere	45

==== Slalom ====
Rank	after 2 of 10 events	Points
1	(Albania) Lara Colturi	180
2	(Germany) Emma Aicher	132
3	(Sweden) Anna Swenn-Larsson	105
4	(Sweden) Sara Hector	100
5	(Croatia) Zrinka Ljutić	86

==== Prize money ====
Rank	after 3 of 40 payouts	euro (€)
1	(Albania) Lara Colturi	105,000
2	(Germany) Emma Aicher	75,000
3	(United States) Paula Moltzan	57,200
4	(Sweden) Sara Hector	37,200
5	(Sweden) Anna Swenn-Larsson	23,000

== Nations Cup ==
=== Overall ===
Rank	after 6 of 83 events	Points
1	Switzerland	559
2	Sweden	468
3	France	419
4	United States	386
5	Norway	373

=== Men ===
Rank	after 3 of 43 events	Points
1	Norway	347
2	Switzerland	337
3	France	289
4	Austria	211
5	Brazil	200

=== Women ===
Rank	after 3 of 40 events	Points
1	Sweden	364
2	United States	298
3	Albania	260
4	Germany	241
5	Switzerland	222

== Podium table by nation ==
Table showing the World Cup podium places (gold–1st place, silver–2nd place, bronze–3rd place) by the countries represented by the athletes.

- Standings after 6 events

Rank	Nation	Gold	Silver	Bronze	Total
1	Brazil	2	0	0	2
2	Albania	1	2	0	3
3	Norway	1	1	0	2
4	Germany	1	0	1	2
5	United States	1	0	0	1
6	Switzerland	0	1	3	4
7	Sweden	0	1	1	2
8	France	0	1	0	1
9	Austria	0	0	1	1
Totals (9 entries)		6	6	6	18

== Points distribution ==
The table shows the number of points won in the 2026–27 FIS Alpine Ski World Cup for men and women.

Place	1	2	3	4	5	6	7	8	9	10	11	12	13	14	15	16	17	18	19	20	21	22	23	24	25	26	27	28	29	30
World Cup	100	80	60	50	45	40	36	32	29	26	24	22	20	18	16	15	14	13	12	11	10	9	8	7	6	5	4	3	2	1
World Cup Finals	100	80	60	50	45	40	36	32	29	26	24	22	20	18	16	—N/a

== Prize money distribution ==
Higher prize money will be distributed this season in Euro (€).

=== Men and women ===
1st	2nd	3rd	4th	5th	6th	7th	8th	9th	10th	11th	12th	13th	14th	15th	Total: €168,000
€55,000	€25,000	€15,000	€10,000	€8,000	€7,000	€6,000	€5,000	€4,000	€3,500	€3,000	€2,500	€2,200	€2,000	€1,900	Total: €168,000
16th	17th	18th	19th	20th	21st	22nd	23rd	24th	25th	26th	27th	28th	29th	30th	Total: €168,000
€1,750	€1,600	€1,500	€1,450	€1,400	€1,350	€1,300	€1,200	€1,100	€1,000	€950	€900	€850	€800	€750	Total: €168,000

=== Kitzbühel ===
1st	2nd	3rd	4th	5th	6th	7th	8th	9th	10th	11th	12th	13th	14th	15th	Total: €350,000
€101,000	€51,000	€26,000	€18,500	€15,500	€13,500	€12,500	€11,500	€10,500	€9,500	€8,500	€7,500	€6,500	€5,500	€4,500	Total: €350,000
16th	17th	18th	19th	20th	21st	22nd	23rd	24th	25th	26th	27th	28th	29th	30th	Total: €350,000
€3,900	€3,800	€3,700	€3,600	€3,500	€3,400	€3,300	€3,200	€3,100	€3,000	€2,900	€2,800	€2,700	€2,600	€2,500	Total: €350,000

== Achievements ==
First World Cup career victory

Men

Women

- (United States) Paula Moltzan (32), in her 14th season – GS in Sölden
- (Albania) Lara Colturi (20), in her 5th season – SL in Gurgl

First World Cup podium

Men

- (Norway) Eirik Hystad Solberg (24), in his 4th season – SL in Gurgl – 2nd place
- (Switzerland) Tanguy Nef (30), in his 9th season – SL in Gurgl – 3rd place

Women

Number of wins this season (in brackets are all-time wins)

Men

- (Brazil) Lucas Pinheiro Braathen – 2 (10)
- (Norway) Timon Haugan – 1 (7)

Women

- (Germany) Emma Aicher – 1 (6)
- (Albania) Lara Colturi – 1 (1)
- (United States) Paula Moltzan – 1 (1)

== Retirements ==
The following notable skiers, who competed in the World Cup, retired during or after the 2026–27 season:

Men

Women

- (Switzerland) Michelle Gisin
