= 2027 Alpine Skiing World Cup – Women's super-G =

Alpine ski discipline year standings

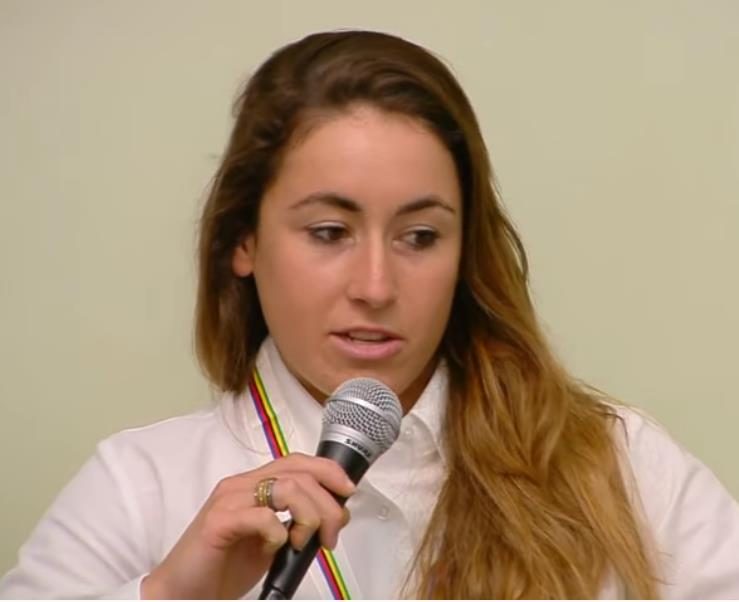
2027 Women's Super-G World Cup: Sofia Goggia of Italy, defending champion; 2027 Women's World Cup; Overall • Downhill • Super-G; Giant slalom • Slalom
Previous: 2026	Next: 2028

The women's super-G in the 2027 FIS Alpine Skiing World Cup is scheduled to consist of nine events, including the final. The season is scheduled to begin in the U.S. at the Birds of Prey course in Beaver Creek, Colorado on 13 November 2026, to be followed the next week by two races at St. Moritz, Switzerland on 18-19 November. Only two races will take place in December, both in Italy the day after downhills at Val di Fassa (10 December) and Cortina d'Ampezzo (17 December). The remaining four races take place in the last five weeks of the season, with two in Switzerland (Lenzerheide, 20-21 February), one in Norway (Kvitfjell (rescheduled from Narvik), 13 March) and then back to the U.S. for the finals at Sun Valley, Idaho (21 March), according to the initial schedule released on 17 July 2026, as modified on 29 October 2026.

The defending season champion was Sofia Goggia of Italy, her first season championship in the discipline to join her four season championships in the downhill discipline.

As is the case every odd-numbered year, the FIS Alpine World Ski Championships will take place, this time in Crans Montana, Switzerland during 1–14 February 2027. The women's super-G is scheduled to take place on Thursday, 4 February 2027.

== Season summary ==
To be added after start of season . . . .

== Finals ==
The finals in this discipline will be held on Sunday, 21 March 2027 in Sun Valley, Idaho, U.S. Only the top 25 skiers in the World Cup discipline and the winner of the 2027 FIS Junior World Championships in the discipline, plus any skiers who have scored at least 500 points in the World Cup overall classification for the season prior to the race, will be eligible to compete in the final, and only the top 15 finishers will earn World Cup points.

== Standings ==
	Venue	13 Dec 2026; Beaver Creek	18 Dec 2026; St. Moritz	19 Dec 2026; St. Moritz	10 Jan 2027; Val di Fassa	17 Jan 2027; Cortina d'Ampezzo	4 Feb 2027; Crans Montana WC	20 Feb 2027; Lenzerheide	21 Feb 2027; Lenzerheide	13 Mar 2027; Kvitfjell	21 Mar 2027; Sun Valley	
#	Skier	(United States)	(Switzerland)	(Switzerland)	(Italy)	(Italy)	(Switzerland)	(Switzerland)	(Switzerland)	(Norway)	(United States)	Total
1	(Italy) Sofia Goggia											0
	(New Zealand) Alice Robinson											0
	(Germany) Emma Aicher											0
	(Norway) Kajsa Vickhoff Lie											0
	(Czech Republic) Ester Ledecká											0
	(Italy) Elena Curtoni											0
	(Switzerland) Malorie Blanc											0
	(France) Romane Miradoli											0
	(Austria) Cornelia Hütter											0
	(Germany) Kira Weidle-Winkelmann											0
	(Switzerland) Corinne Suter											0
	(Italy) Laura Pirovano											0
	(United States) Lindsey Vonn											0
	(United States) Keely Cashman											0
	(France) Laura Gauché											0
	(Austria) Ariane Rädler											0
	(Italy) Roberta Melesi											0
	(France) Camille Cerutti											0
	(Austria) Nina Ortlieb											0
	(United States) Breezy Johnson											0
	(Italy) Asja Zenere											0
	(United States) Mary Bocock											0
	(Canada) Valérie Grenier											0
	(Italy) Federica Brignone											0
	(Austria) Nadine Fest											0
	(Switzerland) Jasmina Suter											0
	(United States) Tricia Mangan											0
	(Switzerland) Stefanie Grob											0
	(Austria) Magdalena Egger											0
	(United States) Jacqueline Wiles											0
	(Italy) Sara Allemand											0
	(Switzerland) Janine Schmitt											0
	(Austria) Ricarda Haaser											0
	(Bosnia and Herzegovina) Elvedina Muzaferija											0
	(United States) Haley Cutler											0
	(Italy) Nicol Delago											0
	(Austria) Stephanie Brunner											0
	(United States) Allison Mollin											0
	(Austria) Julia Scheib											0
	(Norway) Marte Monsen											0
	(Switzerland) Jasmine Flury											0
	(United States) Mikaela Shiffrin											0
	(France) Garance Meyer											0
	(Switzerland) Delia Durrer											0
	(United States) Isabella Wright											0
	(Italy) Sara Thaler											0
	(Andorra) Cande Moreno											0
	(Switzerland) Priska Ming-Nufer											0
	(Italy) Nadia Delago											0
	(Poland) Maryna Gąsienica-Daniel											0
	(Austria) Lisa Grill											0
	References											

=== Legend ===
- Winner (100 points)
- 2nd place (80 points)
- 3rd place (60 points)
- DNF = Did not finish
- DSQ = Disqualified
- Did not start (DNS)
- Not eligible for finals (NE)
- Race canceled (x)
- FIS non-World Cup race (World Championships)
- R# = Rescheduled (make-up) race
- Updated at 21 November 2026, before all races.

== See also ==
- 2027 Alpine Skiing World Cup – Women's summary rankings
- 2027 Alpine Skiing World Cup – Women's overall
- 2027 Alpine Skiing World Cup – Women's downhill
- 2027 Alpine Skiing World Cup – Women's giant slalom
- 2027 Alpine Skiing World Cup – Women's slalom
- World Cup scoring system
