= 2027 Alpine Skiing World Cup – Women's downhill =

Alpine ski discipline year standings

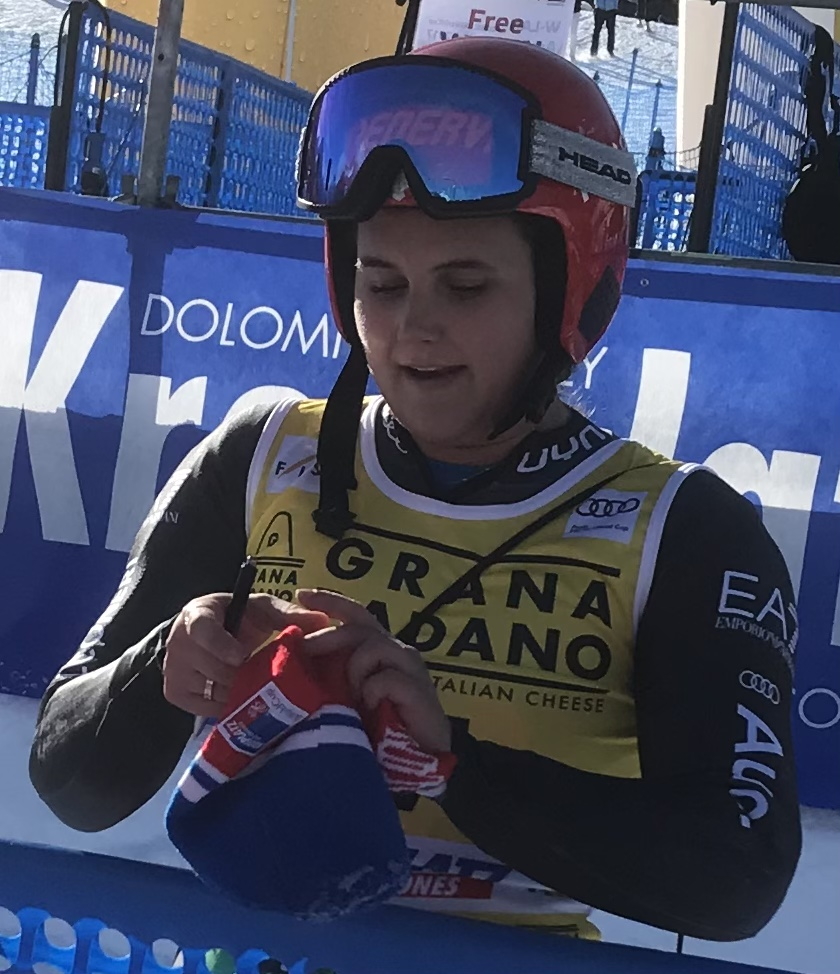
2027 Women's Downhill World Cup: Laura Pirovano of Italy, defending champion; 2027 Women's World Cup; Overall • Downhill • Super-G; Giant slalom • Slalom
| Previous: 2026 | Next: 2028 |

The women's downhill in the 2027 FIS Alpine Skiing World Cup is scheduled to consist of nine events, including the final.

The season is scheduled to begin with two downhills on the famous Birds of Prey course at Beaver Creek, Colorado, U.S. on 11 and 12 December 2026; the women have only raced a downhill on this course once before, in 2024.. The next three downhill races take place in Italy within a week in January 2027, with one at Val di Fassa (9 January) and two at 2026 Winter Olympics host Cortina d'Ampezzo (15-16 January). The remaining four races take place in the last four weeks of the season, with two in Germany (Garmisch, 27-28 February), one in Norway (Kvitfjell (rescheduled from Narvik), 12 March) and then back to the U.S. for the finals at Sun Valley, Idaho (20 March), according to the initial schedule released on 17 July 2026, as modified on 29 October 2026.

Last season's champion was Laura Pirovano from Italy, who won all of the final three races of the season to come from behind and seize the title after leader Lindsey Vonn's season-ending injury at the 2026 Winter Olympics. Vonn is still recovering from her serious injury, but several other skiers have returned from previous injuries, leaving pre-season estimates of the season race wide open.

As is the case every odd-numbered year, the FIS Alpine World Ski Championships will take place, this time in Crans Montana, Switzerland during 1–14 February 2027. The women's downhill is scheduled to take place on Saturday, 6 February 2027.

== Season summary ==
To be added after start of season . . . .

== Finals ==
The finals in this discipline will be held on Saturday, 20 March 2027 in Sun Valley, Idaho, U.S. Only the top 25 skiers in the World Cup discipline and the winner of the 2027 FIS Junior World Championships in the discipline, plus any skiers who have scored at least 500 points in the World Cup overall classification for the season prior to the race, will be eligible to compete in the final, and only the top 15 finishers will earn World Cup points.

== Standings ==
| | Venue | 11 Dec 2026; Beaver Creek | 12 Dec 2026; Beaver Creek | 9 Jan 2027; Val di Fassa | 15 Jan 2027; Cortina d'Ampezzo | 16 Jan 2027; Cortina d'Ampezzo | 6 Feb 2027; Crans Montana WC | 27 Feb 2027; Garmisch | 28 Feb 2027; Garmisch | 12 Mar 2027; Kvitfjell | 20 Mar 2027; Sun Valley | |
| # | Skier | (United States) | (United States) | (Italy) | (Italy) | (Italy) | (Switzerland) | (Germany) | (Germany) | (Norway) | (United States) | Total |
| 1 | (Italy) Laura Pirovano | | | | | | | | | | | 0 |
| | (Germany) Emma Aicher | | | | | | | | | | | 0 |
| | (United States) Breezy Johnson | | | | | | | | | | | 0 |
| | (Germany) Kira Weidle-Winkelmann | | | | | | | | | | | 0 |
| | (United States) Lindsey Vonn | | | | | | | | | | | 0 |
| | (Austria) Cornelia Hütter | | | | | | | | | | | 0 |
| | (Italy) Sofia Goggia | | | | | | | | | | | 0 |
| | (Italy) Nicol Delago | | | | | | | | | | | 0 |
| | (Austria) Nina Ortlieb | | | | | | | | | | | 0 |
| | (Norway) Kajsa Vickhoff Lie | | | | | | | | | | | 0 |
| | (Switzerland) Corinne Suter | | | | | | | | | | | 0 |
| | (Austria) Ariane Rädler | | | | | | | | | | | 0 |
| | (United States) Jacqueline Wiles | | | | | | | | | | | 0 |
| | (Czech Republic) Ester Ledecká | | | | | | | | | | | 0 |
| | (Austria) Mirjam Puchner | | | | | | | | | | | 0 |
| | (France) Romane Miradoli | | | | | | | | | | | 0 |
| | (Austria) Magdalena Egger | | | | | | | | | | | 0 |
| | (Norway) Marte Monsen | | | | | | | | | | | 0 |
| | (Italy) Nadia Delago | | | | | | | | | | | 0 |
| | (Italy) Elena Curtoni | | | | | | | | | | | 0 |
| | (United States) Allison Mollin | | | | | | | | | | | 0 |
| | (Switzerland) Malorie Blanc | | | | | | | | | | | 0 |
| | (Switzerland) Janine Schmitt | | | | | | | | | | | 0 |
| | (Switzerland) Jasmine Flury | | | | | | | | | | | 0 |
| | (United States) Isabella Wright | | | | | | | | | | | 0 |
| | (United States) Keely Cashman | | | | | | | | | | | 0 |
| | (Italy) Roberta Melesi | | | | | | | | | | | 0 |
| | (Austria) Nadine Fest | | | | | | | | | | | 0 |
| | (Switzerland) Delia Durrer | | | | | | | | | | | 0 |
| | (France) Camille Cerutti | | | | | | | | | | | 0 |
| | (United States) Haley Cutler | | | | | | | | | | | 0 |
| | (France) Laura Gauché | | | | | | | | | | | 0 |
| | (Switzerland) Stefanie Grob | | | | | | | | | | | 0 |
| | (Austria) Ricarda Haaser | | | | | | | | | | | 0 |
| | (New Zealand) Alice Robinson | | | | | | | | | | | 0 |
| | (Switzerland) Priska Ming-Nufer | | | | | | | | | | | 0 |
| | (Austria) Lena Wechner | | | | | | | | | | | 0 |
| | (Switzerland) Jasmina Suter | | | | | | | | | | | 0 |
| | (Italy) Sara Thaler | | | | | | | | | | | 0 |
| | (Austria) Christina Ager | | | | | | | | | | | 0 |
| | (Switzerland) Jasmin Mathis | | | | | | | | | | | 0 |
| | (Canada) Valérie Grenier | | | | | | | | | | | 0 |
| | (United States) Mary Bocock | | | | | | | | | | | 0 |
| | (Austria) Emily Schöpf | | | | | | | | | | | 0 |
| | (Andorra) Cande Moreno | | | | | | | | | | | 0 |
| | (Norway) Inni Holm Wembstad | | | | | | | | | | | 0 |
| | (Austria) Carmen Spielberger | | | | | | | | | | | 0 |
| | (United States) Tricia Mangan | | | | | | | | | | | 0 |
| | (Italy) Asja Zenere | | | | | | | | | | | 0 |
| | (Austria) Leonie Zegg | | | | | | | | | | | 0 |
| | References | | | | | | | | | | | |

=== Legend ===
- Winner (100 points)
- 2nd place (80 points)
- 3rd place (60 points)
- DNF = Did not finish
- DSQ = Disqualified
- Did not start (DNS)
- Not eligible for finals (NE)
- Race canceled (x)
- FIS non-World Cup race (Olympics)
- R# = Rescheduled (make-up) race
- Updated on 20 November 2026, before all events.

== See also ==
- 2027 Alpine Skiing World Cup – Women's summary rankings
- 2027 Alpine Skiing World Cup – Women's overall
- 2027 Alpine Skiing World Cup – Women's super-G
- 2027 Alpine Skiing World Cup – Women's giant slalom
- 2027 Alpine Skiing World Cup – Women's slalom
- World Cup scoring system
