= Camille Cerutti =

French alpine skier (born 1998)

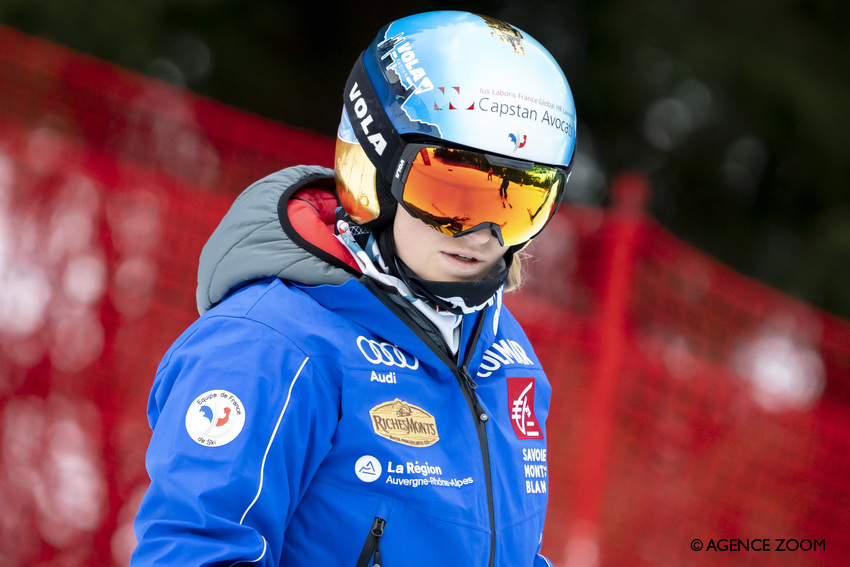

Personal information
- Born: 22 December 1998 (age 27) Marseille, Bouches-du-Rhône, France

Skiing career
- Country: France
- Sport: Alpine skiing
- Club: Club Sports de Risoul
- Disciplines: Downhill, super-G, giant slalom
- World Cup debut: 12 January 2020 (age 21)

Olympics
- Teams: 2 – (2022, 2026)
- Medals: 0

World Championships
- Teams: 1 – (2025)
- Medals: 0

World Cup
- Seasons: 7 – (2020–2026)
- Podiums: 0
- Overall titles: 0 – (48th in 2026)
- Discipline titles: 0 – (18th in SG, 2026)

Camille Cerutti (born 22 December 1998) is a French World Cup alpine ski racer who specializes in the speed disciplines of super-G and downhill while also competing in giant slalom. She competed for France at the 2022 and 2026 Winter Olympics, as well as the 2025 World Championships.

== Career ==
Cerutti was born in Marseille and joined the French national team as a teenager. She won French youth national championships in giant slalom in 2014 and in super-G in 2016, then competed in the 2016 Youth Olympics.

After sitting out a season due to back pain, she raced on the second-level tours – the Europa Cup and Nor-Am Cup – and participated in the 2019 Junior World Championships before making her World Cup debut (and earning her first World Cup points) in January 2020 with a 26th-place finish in the combined event in Altenmarkt-Zauchensee, Austria.

Cerutti claimed the super-G title at the French National Championships in 2021, and was selected for the French team for the 2022 Winter Olympics. In the Olympic downhill she crashed and suffered torn ligaments in her right knee which required surgery.

After recuperating, Cerutti returned to competitive skiing in January 2023 and won the downhill at the 2023 Europa Cup finals.

During the 2024 and 2025 World Cup seasons, Cerutti gained points in a total nine events. She also competed in the 2025 World Championships, in Saalbach, Austria, taking 25th in the super-G.

Cerutti achieved her first top-ten finish in a World Cup event during the 2026 season when she was fifth in the super-G at Val d'Isère, and was named to her second Olympic team for the 2026 Milano Cortina Games. There she finished 8th in the super-G, 12th in the team combined (paired with Caitlin McFarlane skiing the slalom leg), and 23rd in the downhill, but was unable to finish the second leg of the giant slalom.

== World Cup results ==
=== Season standings ===
Season
Season	Age	Overall	Slalom	Giant slalom	Super-G	Downhill	Combined
2020	21	117	—	—	—	—	36
2021	22	no World Cup points earned					—N/a
2022	23	95	—	—	41	48	—N/a
2023	24	109	—	—	46	—	—N/a
2024	25	99	—	—	41	—	—N/a
2025	26	83	—	—	32	—	—N/a
2026	27	48	—	59	18	31	—N/a

=== Top-ten finishes ===
- 0 podiums; 1 top ten

Season
Season	Date	Location	Discipline	Place
2026	21 December 2025	Val d'Isère, France	Super-G	5th

== World Championships results ==
Year
Year	Age	Slalom	Giant slalom	Super-G	Downhill	Team combined	Team event
2025	26	—	—	25	—	DNS2	—

== Olympic results ==
Year
Year	Age	Slalom	Giant slalom	Super-G	Downhill	Combined	Team combined	Team event
2022	23	—	—	—	DNF	—	—N/a	—
2026	27	—	DNF2	8	23	—N/a	12	—N/a
