= Laurence St-Germain =

Canadian alpine skier (born 1994)

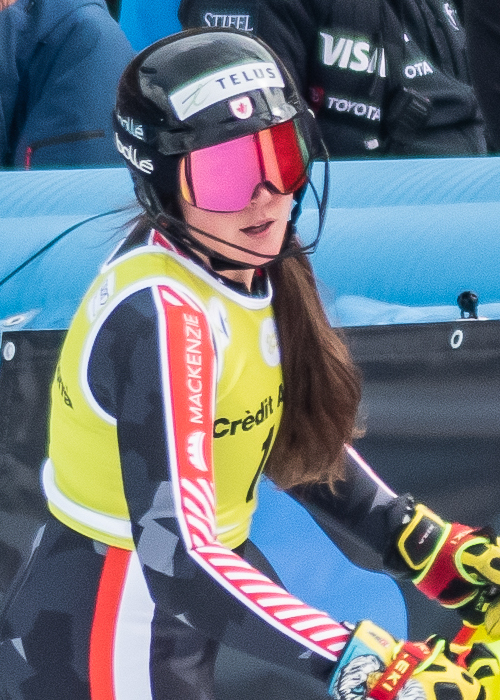
- St-Germain in 2023

Personal information
- Born: 30 May 1994 (age 32) Quebec City, Quebec, Canada
- Height: 5 ft 8 in (173 cm)

Skiing career
- Country: Canada
- Sport: Alpine skiing
- College team: Vermont Catamounts
- Club: Mont-Sainte-Anne
- Disciplines: Slalom, giant slalom
- World Cup debut: 28 November 2015 (age 21)

Olympics
- Teams: 3 – (2018, 2022, 2026)
- Medals: 0

World Championships
- Teams: 4 – (2019–2025)
- Medals: 1 (1 gold)

World Cup
- Seasons: 11 – (2016–2026)
- Podiums: 0
- Overall titles: 0 – (30th in 2021)
- Discipline titles: 0 – (8th in SL, 2021)
Medal record
Women's alpine skiing
Representing Canada
World Championships
| Gold medal – first place | 2023 Méribel | Slalom |

Laurence St-Germain (born 30 May 1994) is a Canadian World Cup alpine ski racer who specializes in the technical events of slalom and giant slalom. She made her World Cup debut in November 2015, and is the 2023 world champion in slalom.

== Career ==
From Saint-Ferréol-les-Neiges, Quebec, St-Germain competed for Canada at the Junior World Championships in 2013; she was 25th in the slalom but failed to finish the second run of the giant slalom on home snow at Mont-Sainte-Anne. She made her World Cup debut in November 2015 in slalom at Aspen, and was 27th. She scored her first World Cup points in November 2017 at Levi with a 17th-place finish in the slalom.

St-Germain made her Olympic debut in 2018, and was 15th in the slalom. At her first World Championships in 2019, she was sixth in the slalom.

St-Germain raced collegiately in the United States for the Catamounts of the University of Vermont, just over the border in Burlington; she was a three-time All-American and the national runner-up in the slalom in 2016.

In January 2022, St-Germain was named to Canada's 2022 Olympic team.

At the 2023 World Championships in Méribel, St-Germain won the gold medal in the slalom. She was the first Canadian woman in 63 years to win an alpine skiing slalom world championship.

== World Cup results ==
=== Season standings ===
Season
| Season | Age | Overall | Slalom | Giant slalom | Super-G | Downhill | Combined | Parallel |
| 2018 | 23 | 90 | 33 | — | — | — | — | —N/a |
| 2019 | 24 | 42 | 13 | — | — | — | — | —N/a |
| 2020 | 25 | 48 | 18 | — | — | — | — | 11 |
| 2021 | 26 | 30 | 8 | — | — | — | —N/a | — |
| 2022 | 27 | 52 | 15 | — | — | — | —N/a | — |
| 2023 | 28 | 50 | 16 | — | — | — | —N/a | —N/a |
| 2024 | 29 | 68 | 26 | — | — | — | —N/a | —N/a |
| 2025 | 30 | 52 | 18 | — | — | — | —N/a | —N/a |
| 2026 | 31 | 63 | 22 | — | — | — | —N/a | —N/a |

=== Top-ten finishes ===
- 0 podiums; 17 top tens

Season
| Season | Date | Location | Discipline | Place |
| 2019 | 29 December 2018 | Semmering, Austria | Slalom | 10th |
| 2019 | 19 February 2019 | Stockholm, Sweden | Parallel slalom | 6th |
| 2020 | 15 December 2019 | St. Moritz, Switzerland | Parallel slalom | 5th |
| 2020 | 29 December 2019 | Lienz, Austria | Slalom | 9th |
| 2020 | 14 January 2020 | Flachau, Austria | Slalom | 10th |
| 2021 | 21 November 2020 | Levi, Finland | Slalom | 6th |
| 2021 | 22 November 2020 | Levi, Finland | Slalom | 8th |
| 2021 | 12 January 2021 | Flachau, Austria | Slalom | 8th |
| 2021 | 6 March 2021 | Jasná, Slovakia | Slalom | 10th |
| 2022 | 29 December 2021 | Lienz, Austria | Slalom | 9th |
| 2022 | 11 January 2022 | Schladming, Austria | Slalom | 8th |
| 2023 | 20 November 2022 | Levi, Finland | Slalom | 9th |
| 2023 | 29 January 2023 | Špindlerův Mlýn, Czech Republic | Slalom | 7th |
| 2023 | 11 March 2023 | Åre, Sweden | Slalom | 5th |
| 2024 | 12 November 2023 | Levi, Finland | Slalom | 7th |
| 2025 | 16 November 2024 | Levi, Finland | Slalom | 10th |
| 2025 | 1 December 2024 | Killington, United States | Slalom | 7th |

== World Championship results ==
Year
| Year | Age | Slalom | Giant slalom | Super-G | Downhill | Combined | Team combined | Team event |
| 2019 | 24 | 6 | — | — | — | — | —N/a | — |
| 2021 | 26 | 17 | — | — | — | — | —N/a | — |
| 2023 | 28 | 1 | — | — | — | — | —N/a | — |
| 2025 | 30 | DNF1 | — | — | — | —N/a | — | 19 |

== Olympic results ==
Year
| Year | Age | Slalom | Giant slalom | Super-G | Downhill | Combined | Team combined |
| 2018 | 23 | 15 | — | — | — | — | —N/a |
| 2022 | 27 | 17 | — | — | — | — | —N/a |
| 2026 | 31 | 12 | — | — | — | —N/a | 13 |
