= Priska Ming-Nufer =

Swiss alpine skier (born 1992)

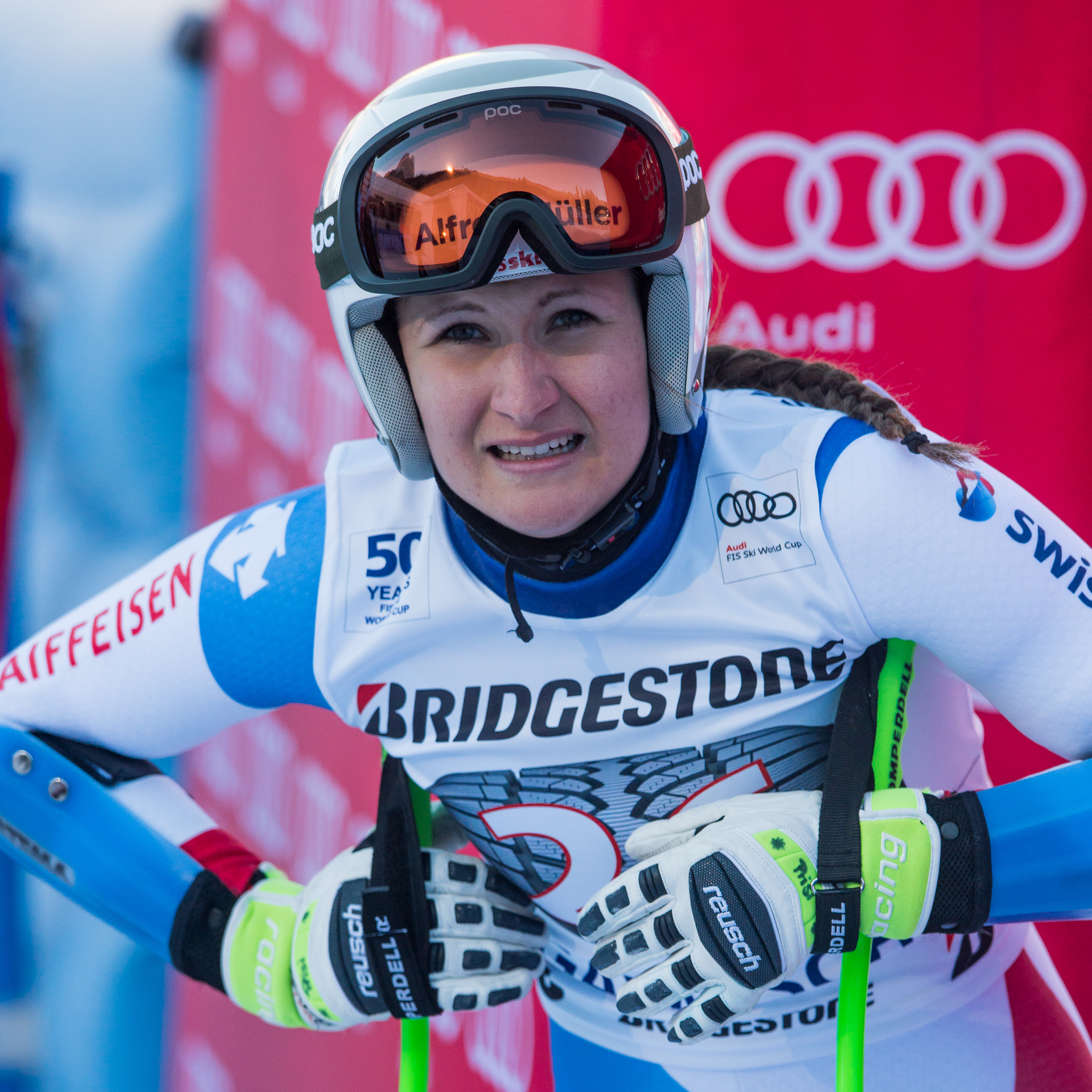
- Nufer in 2017

Personal information
- Born: Priska Nufer; 11 February 1992 (age 34)
- Height: 1.63 m (5 ft 4 in)

Skiing career
- Country: Switzerland
- Sport: Alpine skiing
- Club: Alpnach
- World Cup debut: 29 December 2011 (age 19)

Olympics
- Teams: 1 – (2022)
- Medals: 0

World Championships
- Teams: 4 – (2015, 2021, 2023, 2025)
- Medals: 0

World Cup
- Seasons: 14 – (2012, 2014–2026)
- Wins: 1 – (1 DH)
- Podiums: 1 – (1 DH)
- Overall titles: 0 – (26th in 2021)
- Discipline titles: 0 – (7th in DH, 2022)

Priska Ming-Nufer (née Nufer; 11 February 1992) is a Swiss World Cup alpine ski racer, and specializes in the speed events of downhill and super-G.

Nufer has competed at three World Championships, the first in 2015 at Beaver Creek, US, in the super-G event. She also represented Switzerland at the 2022 Winter Olympics in Beijing, China, in the combined event.

After the Olympics, Nufer won her first World Cup race in late February 2022, a downhill on home-country snow in Crans-Montana, which was also her first podium (and eighth top ten).

== World Cup results ==
=== Season standings ===
Season
Season	Age	Overall	Slalom	Giant slalom	Super-G	Downhill	Combined
2012	20	115	—	—	—	—	38
2014	22	88	—	—	44	47	21
2015	23	79	—	—	32	46	22
2016	24	94	—	—	48	41	38
2017	25	67	—	—	29	32	30
2018	26	47	—	—	23	31	12
2019	27	64	—	—	34	36	8
2020	28	48	—	—	27	29	21
2021	29	26	—	38	14	17	—N/a
2022	30	29	—	—	31	7	—N/a
2023	31	45	—	—	31	20	—N/a
2024	32	44	—	—	27	18	—N/a
2025	33	72	—	—	44	28	—N/a
2026	34	96	—	—	43	34	—N/a

Standings through 27 February 2026

=== Race podiums ===
- 1 win (1 DH)
- 1 podium – (1 DH); 15 top tens

Season
Season	Date	Location	Discipline	Place
2022	27 February 2022	Crans-Montana, Switzerland	Downhill	1st

== World Championship results ==
Year
Year	Age	Slalom	Giant slalom	Super-G	Downhill	Combined	Team combined
2015	23	—	—	16	—	DNF2	—N/a
2021	29	—	—	13	—	DNF2	—N/a
2023	31	—	—	—	11	12	—N/a
2025	33	—	—	—	21	—N/a	12

== Olympics results ==
Year
Year	Age	Slalom	Giant slalom	Super-G	Downhill	Combined	Team event
2022	30	—	—	—	—	DNF2	—
