= Kira Weidle-Winkelmann =

German alpine skier (born 1996)

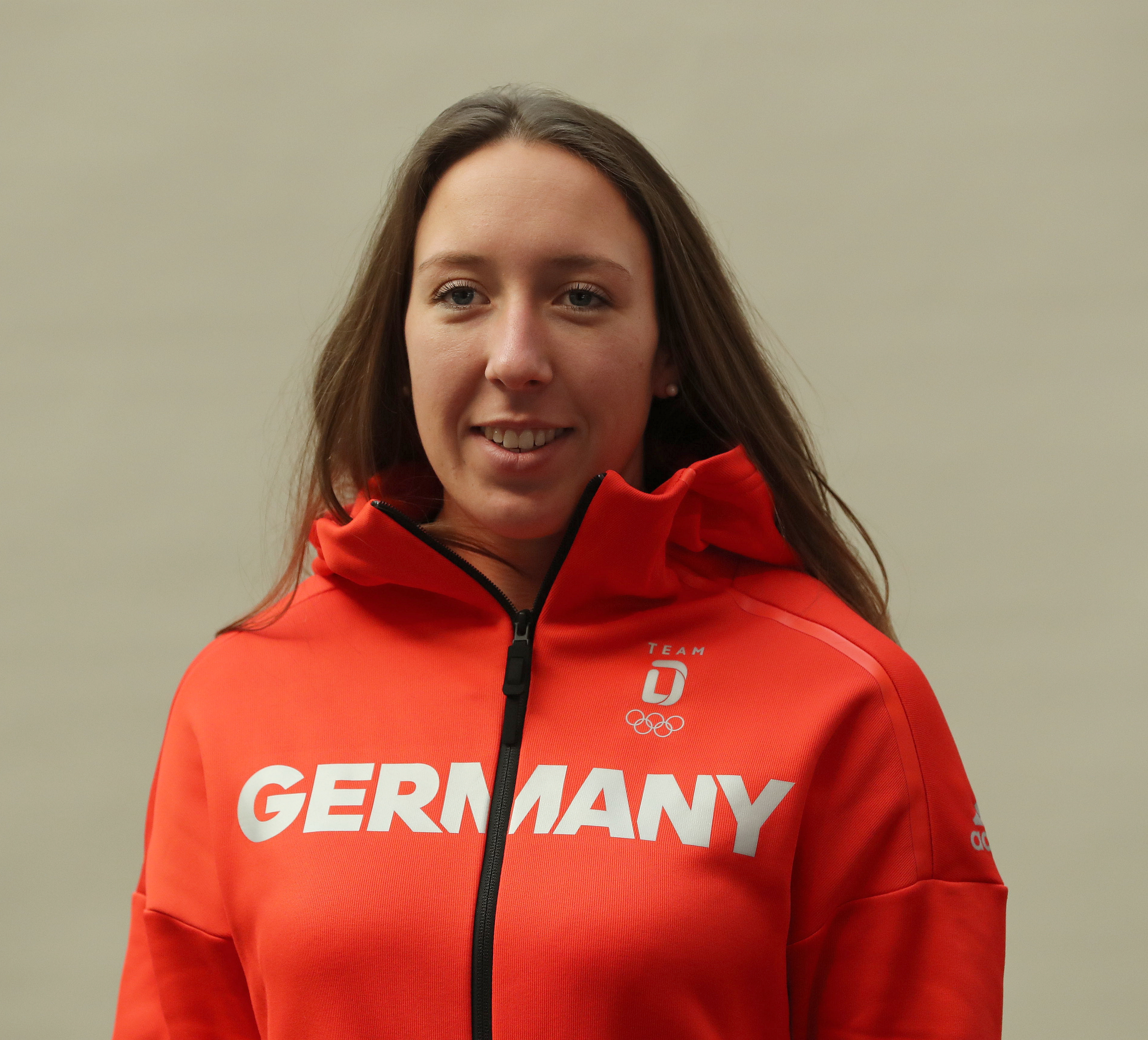
- Weidle in 2018

Personal information
- Born: Kira Weidle; 24 February 1996 (age 30) Stuttgart, Baden-Württemberg, Germany
- Height: 1.72 m (5 ft 8 in)

Skiing career
- Country: Germany
- Sport: Alpine skiing
- Club: SC Starnberg
- Disciplines: Downhill, Super-G
- World Cup debut: 9 January 2016 (age 19)

Olympics
- Teams: 3 – (2018, 2022, 2026)
- Medals: 1 (0 gold)

World Championships
- Teams: 5 − (2017–2025)
- Medals: 1 (0 gold)

World Cup
- Seasons: 11 − (2016–2026)
- Wins: 0
- Podiums: 10 − (9 DH, 1 SG)
- Overall titles: 0 – (10th in 2026)
- Discipline titles: 0 – (4th in DH, 2026)
Medal record
Women's alpine skiing
Representing Germany
Olympic Games
| Silver medal – second place | 2026 Milano Cortina | Team combined |
World Championships
| Silver medal – second place | 2021 Cortina d'Ampezzo | Downhill |
Junior World Championships
| Bronze medal – third place | 2017 Åre | Downhill |

Kira Weidle-Winkelmann (née Weidle; born 24 February 1996) is a German World Cup alpine ski racer, specializing in the speed events of downhill and super-G. Weidle-Winkelmann won the silver medal in the team combined at the 2026 Winter Olympics, skiing the downhill run with partner Emma Aicher skiing slalom. She made her World Cup debut in January 2016 and attained her first podium in November 2018. Weidle won the silver medal in the downhill at the 2021 World Championships in Cortina d'Ampezzo.

== World Cup results ==
=== Season standings ===
Season
| Season | Age | Overall | Slalom | Giant slalom | Super-G | Downhill | Combined |
| 2017 | 20 | 105 | — | — | 41 | 50 | — |
| 2018 | 21 | 62 | — | — | 42 | 25 | — |
| 2019 | 22 | 25 | — | — | 39 | 5 | — |
| 2020 | 23 | 30 | — | — | 36 | 13 | — |
| 2021 | 24 | 20 | — | — | 23 | 5 | —N/a |
| 2022 | 25 | 27 | — | — | 21 | 11 | —N/a |
| 2023 | 26 | 22 | — | — | 17 | 7 | —N/a |
| 2024 | 27 | 22 | — | — | 11 | 15 | —N/a |
| 2025 | 28 | 38 | — | — | 18 | 17 | —N/a |
| 2026 | 29 | 10 | — | — | 10 | 4 | —N/a |

=== Race podiums ===
- 0 wins
- 10 podiums – (9 DH, 1 SG); 53 top tens (37 DH, 16 SG)

Season
| Season | Date | Location | Discipline | Place |
| 2019 | 30 November 2018 | Lake Louise, Canada | Downhill | 3rd |
| 2019 | 27 January 2019 | Garmisch-Partenkirchen, Germany | Downhill | 3rd |
| 2021 | 27 February 2021 | Val di Fassa, Italy | Downhill | 3rd |
| 2022 | 15 January 2022 | Zauchensee, Austria | Downhill | 2nd |
| 2023 | 17 December 2022 | St. Moritz, Switzerland | Downhill | 3rd |
| 2023 | 20 January 2023 | Cortina d'Ampezzo, Italy | Downhill | 3rd |
| 2026 | 20 December 2025 | Val d'Isère, France | Downhill | 2nd |
| 2026 | 17 January 2026 | Tarvisio, Italy | Downhill | 2nd |
| 2026 | 21 March 2026 | Kvitfjell, Norway | Downhill | 3rd |
| 2026 | 22 March 2026 | Kvitfjell, Norway | Super-G | 3rd |

== World Championship results ==
Year
| Year | Age | Slalom | Giant slalom | Super-G | Downhill | Combined | Team combined |
| 2017 | 20 | — | — | 31 | 29 | DSQ2 | —N/a |
| 2019 | 22 | — | — | 18 | 13 | — | —N/a |
| 2021 | 24 | — | DNF1 | 19 | 2 | — | —N/a |
| 2023 | 26 | — | DNF1 | 23 | 8 | — | —N/a |
| 2025 | 28 | — | — | 23 | 12 | —N/a | DNF2 |

== Olympic results ==
Year
| Year | Age | Slalom | Giant slalom | Super-G | Downhill | Combined | Team combined |
| 2018 | 21 | — | — | DNF | 11 | — | —N/a |
| 2022 | 25 | — | — | 15 | 4 | — | —N/a |
| 2026 | 29 | — | — | DNF | 9 | —N/a | 2 |
