= Katharina Huber =

Austrian alpine skier (born 1995)

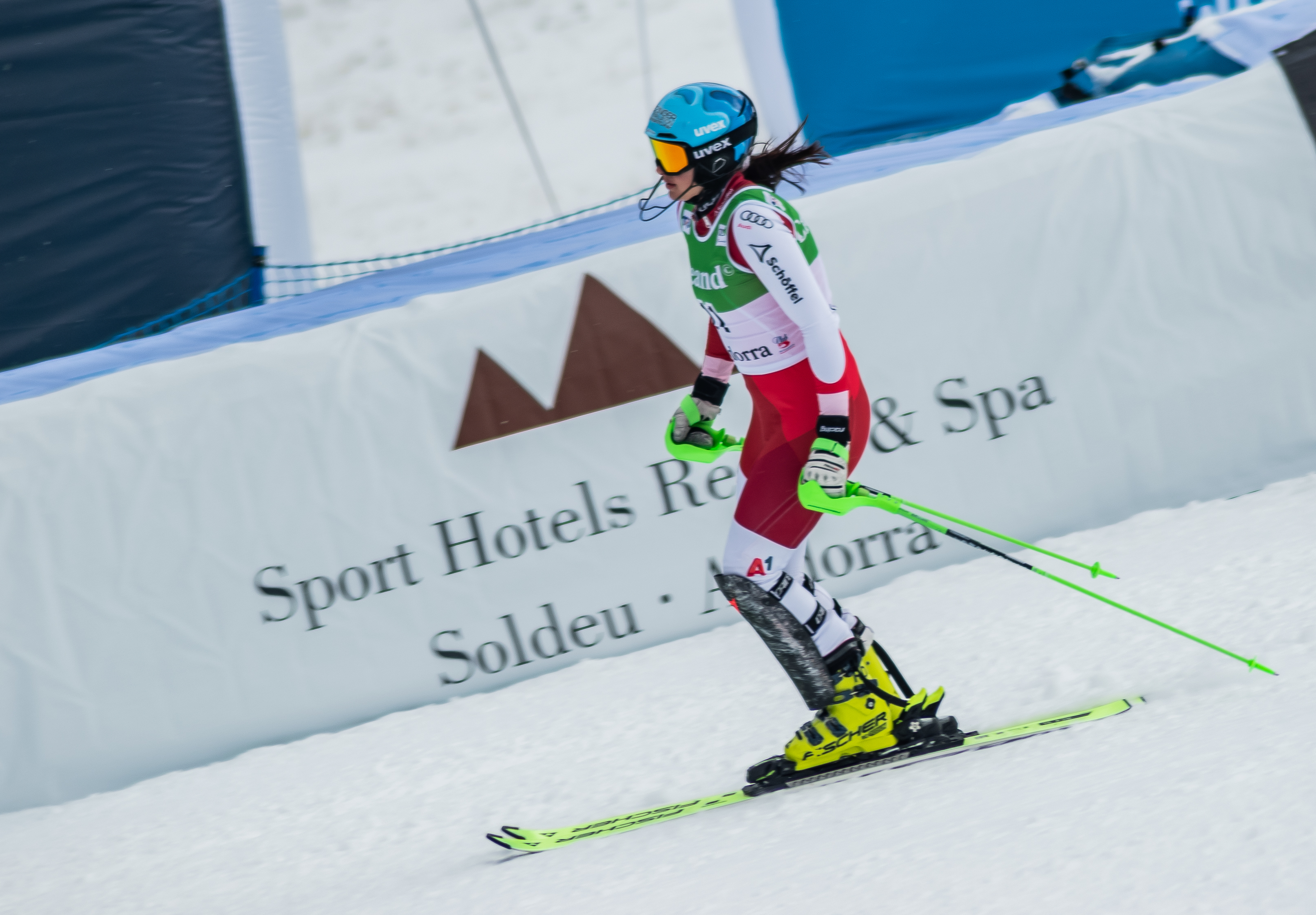
- At Soldeu in 2024

Personal information
- Born: 3 October 1995 (age 30) Sankt Georgen am Reith, Lower Austria, Austria

Skiing career
- Country: Austria
- Sport: Alpine skiing
- Club: Sportunion Waidhofen Ybbs
- Disciplines: Slalom, giant slalom, combined
- World Cup debut: November 2015 (age 20)

Olympics
- Teams: 2 – (2022, 2026)
- Medals: 2 (2 gold)

World Championships
- Teams: 4 – (2019–2025)
- Medals: 0

World Cup
- Seasons: 11 – (2016–2026)
- Podiums: 0
- Overall titles: 0 – (31st in 2024)
- Discipline titles: 0 – (10th in SL, 2024)
Medal record
Women's alpine skiing
Representing Austria
Olympic Games
Gold medal – first place	2022 Beijing	Team event
Gold medal – first place	2026 Milano Cortina	Team combined

Katharina Huber (born 3 October 1995) is an Austrian World Cup alpine ski racer who specializes in the technical events, with a focus on slalom. She made her World Cup debut in November 2015.

Huber represented Austria at the 2022 Winter Olympics in slalom and combined, and won a gold medal as an alternate for the Austrian side in the team event. She won a second gold in the team combined with Ariane Rädler at the 2026 Winter Olympics. She has participated in four World Championships.

== World Cup results ==
=== Season standings ===
Season
Season	Age	Overall	Slalom	Giant slalom	Super-G	Downhill	Combined	Parallel
2016	20	90	34	—	—	—	—	—N/a
2017	21	111	48	—	—	—	—	—N/a
2018	22	82	31	—	—	—	—	—N/a
2019	23	65	24	—	—	—	—	—N/a
2020	24	61	20	39	—	—	—	—
2021	25	58	22	—	—	—	—N/a	33
2022	26	42	16	28	—	—	—N/a	—
2023	27	67	30	43	—	—	—N/a	—N/a
2024	28	31	10	—	—	—	—N/a	—N/a
2025	29	44	14	—	—	—	—N/a	—N/a
2026	30	52	15	—	—	—	—N/a	—N/a

=== Top-ten finishes ===
- 0 podiums; 12 top tens

Season
Season	Date	Location	Discipline	Place
2020	23 November 2019	Levi, Finland	Slalom	8th
2021	21 November 2020	Levi, Finland	Slalom	10th
2021	29 December 2020	Semmering, Austria	Slalom	10th
2022	21 November 2021	Levi, Finland	Slalom	10th
2024	11 November 2023	Levi, Finland	Slalom	8th
2024	29 December 2023	Lienz, Austria	Slalom	6th
2024	7 January 2024	Kranjska Gora, Slovenia	Slalom	9th
2024	16 March 2024	Saalbach, Austria	Slalom	5th
2025	29 December 2024	Semmering, Austria	Slalom	10th
2025	30 January 2025	Courchevel, France	Slalom	8th
2026	13 January 2026	Flachau, Austria	Slalom	10th
2026	25 January 2026	(Czech Republic) Špindlerův Mlýn, Czech Republic	Slalom	7th

== World Championship results ==
Year
Year	Age	Slalom	Giant slalom	Super-G	Downhill	Combined	Team combined	Parallel	Team event
2019	23	7	—	—	—	—	—N/a	—N/a	—
2021	25	DNF1	—	—	—	13	—N/a	—	—
2023	27	11	—	—	—	—	—N/a	—	—
2025	29	—	—	—	—	—N/a	6	—N/a	—

== Olympic results ==
Year
Year	Age	Slalom	Giant slalom	Super-G	Downhill	Combined	Team combined	Team event
2022	26	12	—	—	—	5	—N/a	1
2026	30	6	—	—	—	—N/a	1	—N/a
