= Romane Miradoli =

French alpine skier (born 1994)

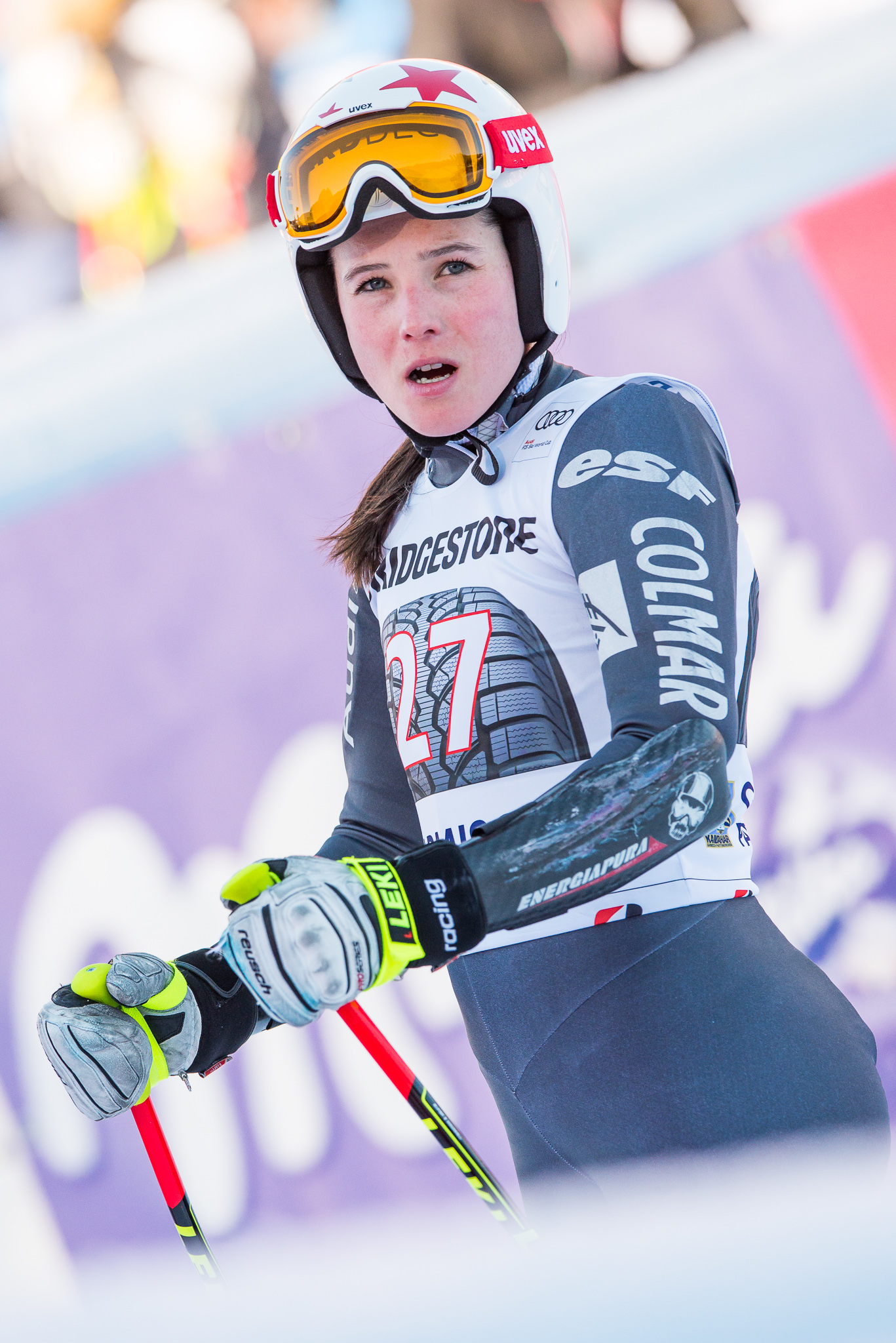
- At Garmisch-Partenkirchen in 2017

Personal information
- Born: 10 March 1994 (age 32) Bonneville, Haute-Savoie, France
- Height: 1.69 m (5 ft 7 in)

Skiing career
- Country: France
- Sport: Alpine skiing
- Disciplines: Downhill, Super-G, giant slalom, combined
- World Cup debut: 7 December 2012 (age 18)

Olympics
- Teams: 3 – (2018, 2022, 2026)
- Medals: 1 (0 gold)

World Championships
- Teams: 4 – (2017, 2019, 2023, 2025)
- Medals: 0

World Cup
- Seasons: 14 – (2013–2026)
- Wins: 1 – (1 SG)
- Podiums: 5 – (5 SG) + 1 Team event
- Overall titles: 0 – (17th in 2020)
- Discipline titles: 0 – (8th in SG, 2026)
Medal record
Women's alpine skiing
Representing France
Olympic Games
Silver medal – second place	2026 Milano Cortina	Super-G
Junior World Championships
Silver medal – second place	2015 Hafjell	Combined
Bronze medal – third place	2013 Quebec	Downhill
Bronze medal – third place	2013 Quebec	Giant slalom

Romane Miradoli (French pronunciation: [ʁɔman miʁadɔli]; born 10 March 1994) is a French World Cup alpine ski racer. Born in Bonneville, Haute-Savoie, she has competed for France in four World Championships and three Winter Olympics.

Miradoli made her World Cup debut in December 2012 and her first podium was a super-G victory in March 2022.

== World Cup results ==
=== Season standings ===
Season
Season	Age	Overall	Slalom	Giant slalom	Super-G	Downhill	Combined
2014	19	112	—	—	—	—	24
2015	20	75	—	—	38	—	9
2016	21	51	—	—	18	51	18
2017	22	78	—	—	33	48	31
2018	23	59	—	—	25	38	21
2019	24	23	—	40	12	14	7
2020	25	17	—	48	12	18	14
2021	26	98	—	39	—	—	—N/a
2022	27	18	—	41	9	20	—N/a
2023	28	37	—	47	15	27	—N/a
2024	29	34	—	—	12	32	—N/a
2025	30	30	—	—	9	31	—N/a
2026	31	20	—	—	8	17	—N/a

=== Race podiums ===
- 1 win – (1 SG)
- 5 podiums – (5 SG) plus 1 Team event; 41 top tens

Season
Season	Date	Location	Discipline	Place
2022	5 March 2022	Lenzerheide, Switzerland	Super-G	1st
2023	18 December 2022	St. Moritz, Switzerland	Super-G	3rd
2024	28 January 2024	Cortina d'Ampezzo, Italy	Super-G	3rd
2025	14 March 2025	La Thuile, Italy	Super-G	3rd
2026	14 December 2025	St. Moritz, Switzerland	Super-G	2nd

== World Championship results ==
Year
Year	Age	Slalom	Giant slalom	Super-G	Downhill	Combined	Team combined
2017	22	—	—	16	31	16	—N/a
2019	24	—	—	17	20	25	—N/a
2023	28	—	DNF2	16	16	DNF2	—N/a
2025	30	—	—	15	23	—N/a	11

== Olympic results ==
Year
Year	Age	Slalom	Giant slalom	Super-G	Downhill	Combined	Team combined
2018	23	—	—	19	18	DNF2	—N/a
2022	27	—	—	11	13	DNF2	—N/a
2026	31	—	—	2	16	—N/a	DNF2
