= Ragnhild Mowinckel =

Norwegian alpine skier

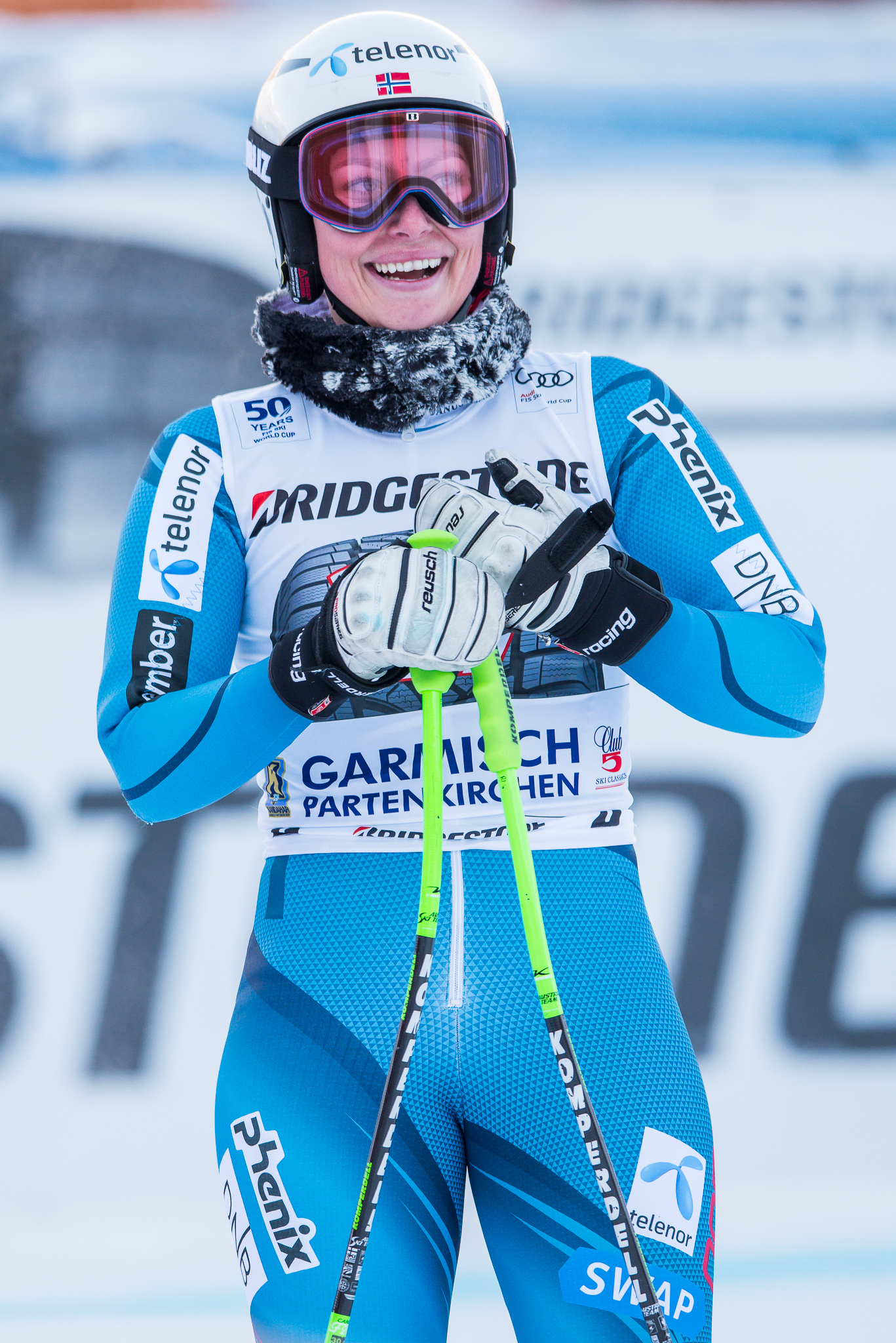
- January 2017

Personal information
- Born: 12 September 1992 (age 33) Molde, Møre og Romsdal, Norway
- Height: 1.68 m (5 ft 6 in)
- Website: ragmow.com

Skiing career
- Sport: Alpine skiing
- Club: SK Rival
- Retired: 23 March 2024 (age 31)
- Disciplines: Giant slalom, Super-G, Downhill, Combined
- World Cup debut: 3 January 2012 (age 19)

Olympics
- Teams: 3 – (2014–2022)
- Medals: 2 (0 gold)

World Championships
- Teams: 6 – (2013–2023)
- Medals: 2 (0 gold)

World Cup
- Seasons: 12 – (2012–2019, 2021–2024)
- Wins: 4 – (1 GS, 2 SG, 1 DH)
- Podiums: 14
- Overall titles: 0 – (4th in 2022)
- Discipline titles: 0 – (3rd in SG, 2023)
Medal record
Women's alpine skiing
Representing Norway
World Cup race podiums
Event	1st	2nd	3rd
Giant slalom	1	3	1
Super-G	2	2	3
Downhill	1	1	0
Total	4	6	4
International competitions
Event	1st	2nd	3rd
Olympic Games	0	2	0
World Championships	0	0	2
Junior World Championships	3	1	1
Total	3	3	3
Olympic Games
Silver medal – second place	2018 Pyeongchang	Downhill
Silver medal – second place	2018 Pyeongchang	Giant slalom
World Championships
Bronze medal – third place	2019 Åre	Combined
Bronze medal – third place	2023 Méribel	Giant slalom
Junior World Championships
Gold medal – first place	2012 Roccaraso	Giant slalom
Gold medal – first place	2012 Roccaraso	Combined
Gold medal – first place	2013 Quebec	Combined
Silver medal – second place	2013 Quebec	Giant slalom
Bronze medal – third place	2012 Roccaraso	Super-G

Ragnhild Mowinckel (born 12 September 1992) is a retired Norwegian World Cup alpine ski racer, representing the club SK Rival.

== Career ==
Born in Molde, Møre og Romsdal, Mowinckel won the gold medal at the Junior World Championships in 2012 in the giant slalom and super combined as well as bronze in super-G. Earlier that season in January, she made her World Cup debut in a slalom race at Zagreb. Mowinckel collected her first World Cup points with a 25th place in giant slalom in Schladming in March.

At St. Moritz in December 2012, she improved to 16th place in the super combined and 19th in the super-G. Two months later at the World Championships, she finished 17th in the super combined, 27th in the downhill and 21st in the giant slalom.

Mowinckel had her breakthrough in the 2018 season, taking her first podiums: third place in super-G in Val d'Isère and runner-up in giant slalom in Kronplatz. At the Winter Olympics in Korea, Mowinckel surprisingly won two silver medals in giant slalom and downhill; she also finished fourth in combined and 13th in super-G. Her first World cup win came in giant slalom in Ofterschwang in March 2018, beating home favourite Viktoria Rebensburg.

Mowinckel suffered a serious anterior cruciate ligament injury in March 2019 and another the following autumn; these injuries forced her to sit out the entire 2020 season. She made her return to the World Cup in the 2021 season and has since made steady progress back towards the top. Mowinckel reached her first podium since 2019, when she placed second in the super-G in Val d'Isère in December 2021.

In the first competition of the 2022 Winter Olympics, the giant slalom, Mowinckel delivered her season's best run in the discipline, placing fifth.

In February 2024 Mowinckel announced she will retire from active skiing at the end of the 2024 season.

== World Cup results ==
=== Season standings ===
Season
Season	Age	Overall	Slalom	Giant slalom	Super-G	Downhill	Combined
2012	19	117	—	51	—	—	—
2013	20	84	—	—	37	—	27
2014	21	48	—	28	21	48	13
2015	22	32	—	11	24	32	—
2016	23	36	—	24	22	31	9
2017	24	20	—	10	20	29	9
2018	25	8	—	4	10	8	15
2019	26	7	38	6	5	23	10
2020	27	Knee injury – out for entire season					
2021	28	29	—	19	16	24	—N/a
2022	29	4	—	7	4	6	—N/a
2023	30	6	—	9	3	10	—N/a
2024	31	11	—	13	8	12	—N/a

=== Race podiums ===
- 4 wins – (1 GS, 2 SG, 1 DH)
- 14 podiums – (5 GS, 7 SG, 2 DH); 82 top tens

Season
Season	Date	Location	Discipline	Place
2018	16 December 2017	Val d'Isère, France	Super-G	3rd
2018	23 January 2018	Kronplatz, Italy	Giant slalom	2nd
2018	9 March 2018	Ofterschwang, Germany	Giant slalom	1st
2019	24 November 2018	(United States) Killington, USA	Giant slalom	2nd
2019	2 December 2018	Lake Louise, Canada	Super-G	2nd
2019	1 February 2019	Maribor, Slovenia	Giant slalom	3rd
2022	19 December 2021	Val d'Isère, France	Super-G	2nd
2022	26 February 2022	Crans-Montana, Switzerland	Downhill	2nd
2022	17 March 2022	Courchevel, France	Super-G	1st
2023	4 December 2022	Lake Louise, Canada	Super-G	3rd
2023	22 January 2023	Cortina d'Ampezzo, Italy	Super-G	1st
2023	25 January 2023	Kronplatz, Italy	Giant slalom	2nd
2023	16 March 2023	Soldeu, Andorra	Super-G	3rd
2024	27 January 2024	Cortina d'Ampezzo, Italy	Downhill	1st

== World Championship results ==
Year
Year	Age	Slalom	Giant slalom	Super-G	Downhill	Combined
2013	20	—	21	DNF	27	17
2015	22	—	18	20	25	9
2017	24	—	18	6	20	10
2019	26	—	4	6	5	3
2021	28	—	9	12	10	9
2023	30	—	3	5	10	DNS SL

== Olympic results ==
Year
Year	Age	Slalom	Giant slalom	Super-G	Downhill	Combined
2014	21	—	DNF2	19	27	6
2018	25	—	2	13	2	4
2022	29	—	5	6	14	—
