= Alix Wilkinson =

American alpine skier

Personal information
- Born: August 2, 2000 (age 26) Mammoth Lakes, California, United States

Skiing career
- Sport: Alpine skiing
- Club: Team Palisades Tahoe
- Disciplines: Downhill, Super-G
- World Cup debut: December 12, 2019 (age 18)

Olympics
- Teams: 1 - (2022)
- Medals: 0 (0 gold)

World Championships
- Teams: 0
- Medals: 0 (0 gold)

World Cup
- Seasons: 2 – (2019, 2022)
- Wins: 0
- Podiums: 0
- Overall titles: 0
- Discipline titles: 0

Alix Wilkinson (born August 2, 2000) is an American World Cup alpine skier from Mammoth Lakes, California. She focuses on the speed events of downhill and super-G, and made her World Cup debut in December 2019 in downhill at Lake Louise, Canada.

Wilkinson represented the United States at the 2022 Winter Olympics as a replacement for an injured Breezy Johnson.

== World Cup results ==
=== Season standings ===
Season	Age	Overall	Slalom	Giant slalom	Super-G	Downhill	Combined
2022	21	70	—	—	—	37	—

Standings through February 10, 2022

== Olympic results ==
Year	Age	Slalom	Giant Slalom	Super-G	Downhill	Combined
2022	21	—	—	DNF	DNF	
