= 2022 Alpine Skiing World Cup – Women's downhill =

Alpine ski discipline year standings

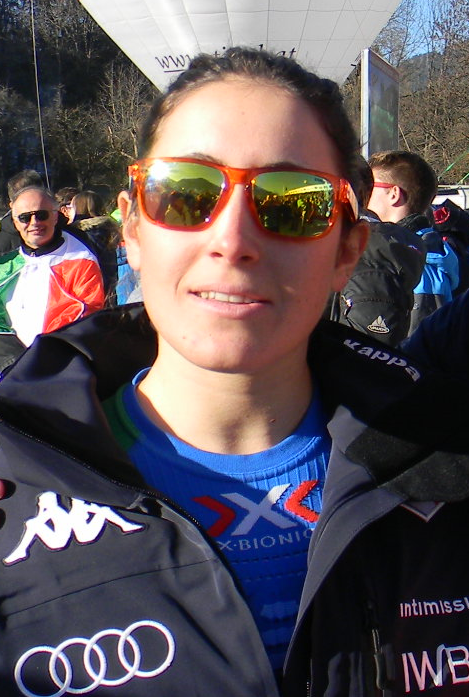
2022 Women's downhill World Cup: Sofia Goggia of Italy, season champion; 2022 Women's World Cup; Overall • Downhill • Super-G; Giant slalom • slalom • Parallel
Previous: 2021	Next: 2023

The women's downhill in the 2022 FIS Alpine Skiing World Cup consisted of nine events including the finals. Defending champion Sofia Goggia of Italy, who won four of the five downhills in which she competed in 2020–21, continued her domination in 2021–22 by again winning four of the first five downhills. Goggia took a commanding lead in the discipline after American Breezy Johnson, who finished second in each of the first three downhills, missed the rest of the season with a knee injury. Goggia then suffered her own knee injury, including a broken bone and ligament tears, while training for the last downhill prior to the 2022 Winter Olympics, but she was able to continue competing within a month and, after all but the final race of the season, had such a commanding lead that only one other competitor (Corinne Suter of Switzerland) even had a theoretical possibility of overtaking her. At the finals, Suter failed to score, and Goggia won her second consecutive (and third overall) discipline championship.

As noted above, the season was interrupted by the 2022 Winter Olympics in Beijing, China (at the Yanqing National Alpine Skiing Centre in Yanqing District) from 6–19 February 2022. Although the Alpine Skiing branch of the International Ski Federation (FIS) conducts the World Cup and co-organizes the Alpine skiing at the Winter Olympics (along with the International Olympic Committee {IOC)), the Winter Olympics are organized by nation (a maximum of four skiers is permitted per nation), and (after 1968) the Olympic results do not count for World Cup points. Accordingly, the results in the Olympics are highlighted in blue and shown in this table by ordinal position only in each discipline.The women's downhill was held at the "Rock" course on 15 February 2022.

The World Cup final took place on Wednesday, 16 March in the linked resorts of Courchevel and Méribel, France, which are located in Les Trois Vallées, on the L'Eclipse course at Courchevel. Only the top 25 skiers in the World Cup downhill discipline and the winner of the Junior World Championship, plus athletes who have scored at least 500 points in the World Cup overall classification for the season, are eligible to compete in the final, and only the top 15 earn World Cup points. Because of the close race for the overall title, three athletes with 500+ overall points (Mikaela Shiffrin, Petra Vlhová, and Marta Bassino) entered the final, and one of them (Shiffrin, who had only raced two World Cup downhills all year) won it.

== Standings ==
	Venue	3 Dec 2021; Lake Louise	4 Dec 2021; Lake Louise	18 Dec 2021; Val-d'Isère	15 Jan 2022; Zauchensee	22 Jan 2022; Cortina d'Ampezzo	29 Jan 2022; Garmisch	15 Feb 2022; Beijing	26 Feb 2022; Crans Montana	27 Feb 2022; Crans Montana	16 Mar 2022; Courchevel	
#	Skier	(Canada)	(Canada)	(France)	(Austria)	(Italy)	(Germany)	(China)	(Switzerland)	(Switzerland)	(France)	Total
	(Italy) Sofia Goggia	100	100	100	DNF	100	DNS	②	22	60	22	504
2	(Switzerland) Corinne Suter	45	60	40	36	50	100	①	26	50	0	407
3	(Czech Republic) Ester Ledecká	22	9	DNS	32	60	DNS	㉗	100	80	36	339
4	(Austria) Ramona Siebenhofer	50	24	50	60	80	14	⑫	24	9	20	331
5	(Austria) Mirjam Puchner	60	32	60	14	45	20	⑧	45	20	0	296
6	(Norway) Ragnhild Mowinckel	11	15	36	15	32	DNS	⑭	80	45	40	274
7	(Switzerland) Priska Nufer	18	3	4	13	22	18	DNS	50	100	29	257
8	(Italy) Nadia Delago	40	40	32	50	11	45	③	18	10	0	246
9	(United States) Breezy Johnson	80	80	80	DNS							240
10	(Austria) Christine Scheyer	16	45	12	26	20	26	DNS	5	7	80	237
11	(Germany) Kira Weidle	26	36	0	80	26	50	④	DNS	6	0	224
12	(Austria) Cornelia Hütter	36	50	15	DNS		60	⑦	60	0	DNS	221
13	(Switzerland) Joana Hählen	3	18	10	7	DNF	32	⑥	40	29	80	219
14	(Italy) Federica Brignone	20	26	24	40	12	13	DNS	14	36	24	209
15	(Switzerland) Lara Gut-Behrami	14	8	DNS	100	29	DNS	⑯	DNF	12	45	208
16	(Switzerland) Michelle Gisin	DNS		26	DNS	40	DNS	DNS	36	32	50	184
17	(Switzerland) Jasmine Flury	29	0	8	29	8	80	⑮	9	16	0	179
18	(Canada) Marie-Michèle Gagnon	15	29	DNF	45	3	29	⑧	32	24	0	177
19	(Italy) Elena Curtoni	9	18	29	20	18	15	⑤	15	18	26	168
20	(France) Romane Miradoli	12	20	2	11	14	24	⑬	12	22	32	149
21	(Slovenia) Ilka Štuhec	11	15	45	16	24	4	㉒	0	5	18	138
22	(Austria) Stephanie Venier	14	11	11	0	8	22	DNS	18	45	0	129
23	(Austria) Ariane Rädler	DNS	12	22	24	DNS	36	DNS	9	11	0	114
	(Austria) Tamara Tippler	24	22	DNF	4	5	16	⑲	29	14	0	114
25	(Austria) Elisabeth Reisinger	DNS	2	20	9	36	40	DNS	4	0	0	111
26	(United States) Mikaela Shiffrin	5	0	DNS				⑱	DNS		100	105
27	(Italy) Nicol Delago	32	10	DNF	22	18	DNF	⑪	12	DNF	NE	94
28	(France) Laura Gauché	0	7	18	9	10	9	⑩	20	13	NE	86
29	(Austria) Nadine Fest	6	5	16	10	1	12	DNS	13	8	NE	71
	References											

=== Legend ===
- Winner (100 points)
- 2nd place (80 points)
- 3rd place (60 points)
- DNF = Did Not Finish
- DSQ = Disqualified
- Did Not Start (DNS)
- Not Eligible for finals (NE)
- Race canceled (x)
- FIS non-World Cup race (Winter Olympics)
- Updated at 16 March 2022, after all events.

== See also ==
- 2022 Alpine Skiing World Cup – Women's summary rankings
- 2022 Alpine Skiing World Cup – Women's overall
- 2022 Alpine Skiing World Cup – Women's super-G
- 2022 Alpine Skiing World Cup – Women's giant slalom
- 2022 Alpine Skiing World Cup – Women's slalom
- 2022 Alpine Skiing World Cup – Women's parallel
- World Cup scoring system
