= Mirjam Puchner =

Austrian alpine skier (born 1992)

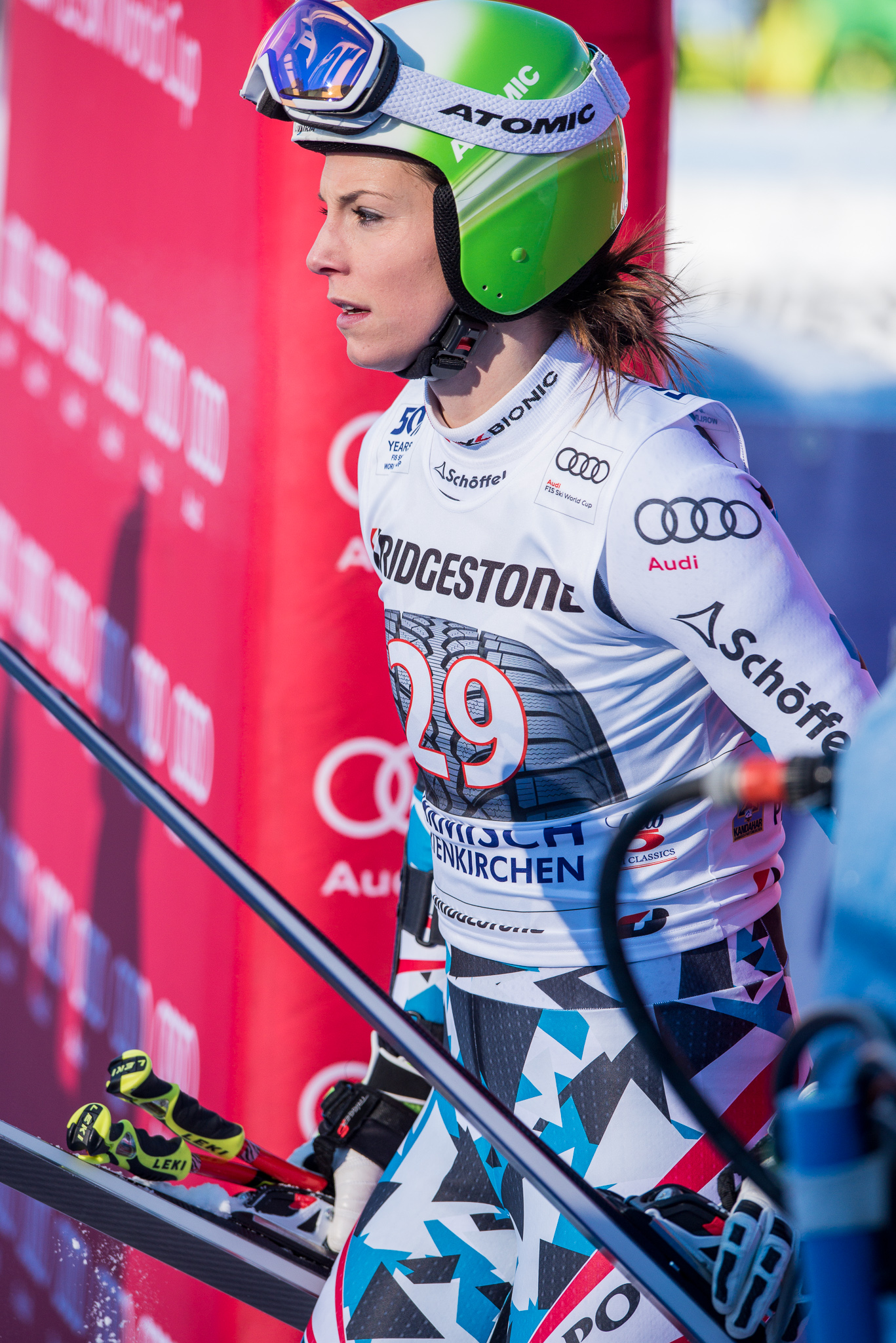
- January 2017

Personal information
- Born: 18 May 1992 (age 34) Schwarzach im Pongau, Salzburg, Austria
- Height: 1.80 m (5 ft 11 in)
- Family: Joachim Puchner (brother)
- Website: mirjam-puchner.at

Skiing career
- Country: Austria
- Sport: Alpine skiing
- Club: WSV St. Johann - Salzburg
- Disciplines: Downhill, Super-G, Combined
- World Cup debut: 12 January 2013 (age 20)

Olympics
- Teams: 2 – (2022, 2026)
- Medals: 1 (0 gold)

World Championships
- Teams: 3 – (2021–2025)
- Medals: 1 (0 gold)

World Cup
- Seasons: 13 – (2013–2017, 2019–2026)
- Wins: 2 – (2 DH)
- Podiums: 9 – (6 DH, 3 SG)
- Overall titles: 0 – (15th in 2024)
- Discipline titles: 0 – (5th in DH, 2022)
Medal record
Women's alpine skiing
Representing Austria
Olympic Games
Silver medal – second place	2022 Beijing	Super-G
World Championships
Silver medal – second place	2025 Saalbach	Downhill

Mirjam Puchner (born 18 May 1992) is an Austrian World Cup alpine ski racer from St Johann im Pongau in Salzburg. She made her World Cup debut on 12 January 2013 in St. Anton, Austria. Puchner attained her first World Cup podium in March 2016 at St. Moritz, Switzerland, where she won the downhill event at the season finals.

Born in Schwarzach im Pongau, she is the sister of alpine ski racer Joachim Puchner (born 1987).

== World Cup results ==
=== Season standings ===
Season
Season	Age	Overall	Slalom	Giant slalom	Super-G	Downhill	Combined
2014	21	94	—	—	—	43	22
2015	22	47	—	—	26	26	21
2016	23	33	—	—	28	12	23
2017	24	49	—	—	27	24	44
2018	25	injured; did not compete					
2019	26	37	—	—	36	11	—
2020	27	59	—	—	25	33	—
2021	28	41	—	—	25	18	—N/a
2022	29	16	—	—	11	5	—N/a
2023	30	19	—	—	10	5	—N/a
2024	31	15	—	—	7	7	—N/a
2025	32	41	—	—	19	14	—N/a
2026	33	29	—	—	19	16	—N/a

=== Race podiums ===
- 2 wins – (2 DH)
- 9 podiums – (6 DH, 3 SG); 42 top tens

Season
Season	Date	Location	Discipline	Place
2016	16 March 2016	St. Moritz, Switzerland	Downhill	1st
2019	13 March 2019	Soldeu, Andorra	Downhill	1st
2022	3 December 2021	Lake Louise, Canada	Downhill	3rd
2022	5 December 2021	Lake Louise, Canada	Super-G	3rd
2022	18 December 2021	Val d'Isère, France	Downhill	3rd
2024	13 January 2024	Zauchensee, Austria	Downhill	3rd
2024	14 January 2024	Zauchensee, Austria	Super-G	3rd
2024	2 March 2024	Kvitfjell, Norway	Super-G	3rd
2026	12 December 2025	St. Moritz, Switzerland	Downhill	3rd

== World Championship results ==
Year
Year	Age	Slalom	Giant slalom	Super-G	Downhill	Combined	Team combined	Team event
2021	28	—	—	—	11	—	—N/a	—
2023	30	—	—	19	4	—	—N/a	—
2025	32	—	—	—	2	—N/a	5	—

== Olympic results ==
Year
Year	Age	Slalom	Giant slalom	Super-G	Downhill	Combined	Team combined
2022	29	—	—	2	8	—	—N/a
2026	33	—	—	DNF	11	—N/a	14
