= Corinne Suter =

Swiss alpine skier (born 1994)

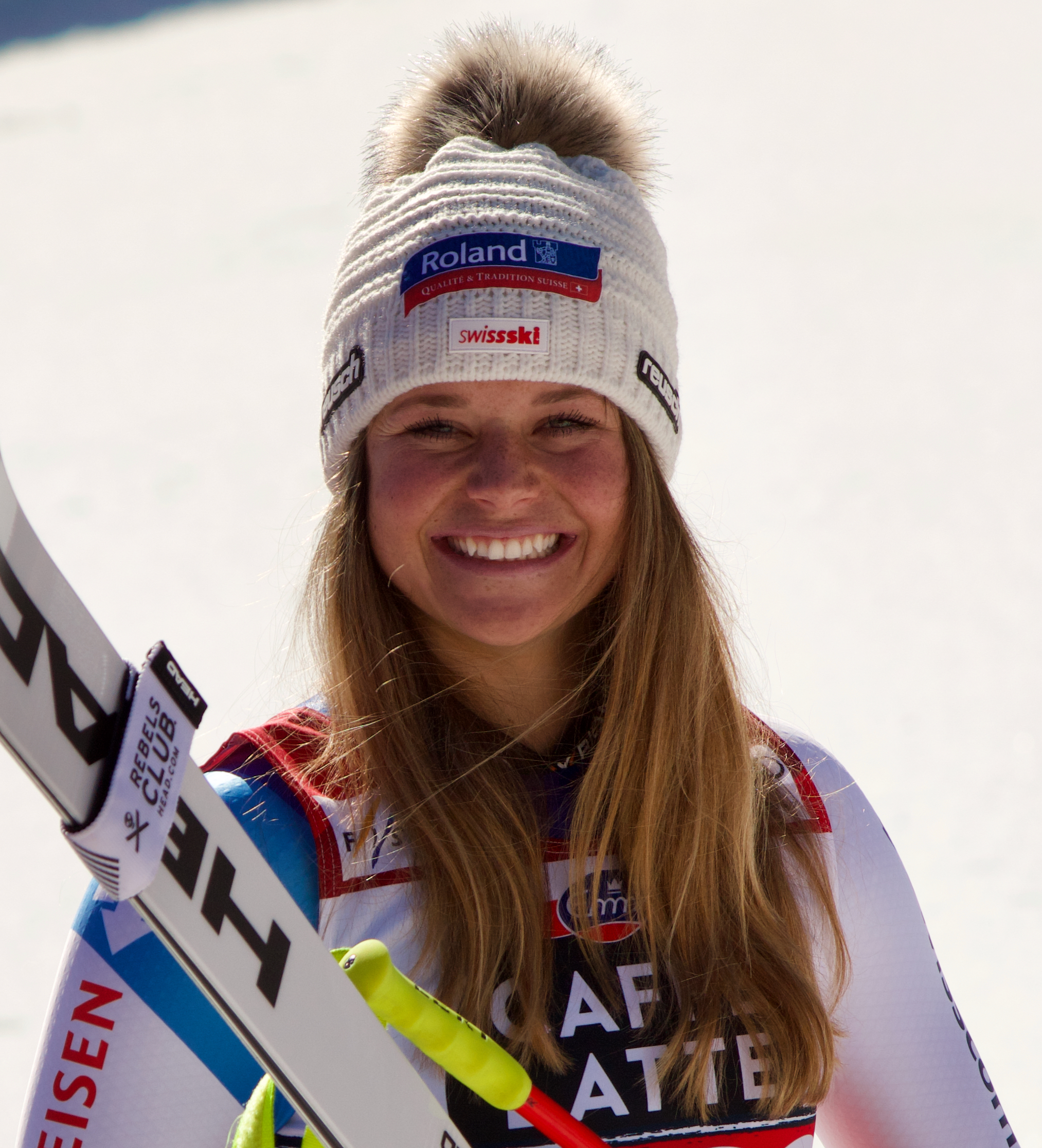
- Suter in Crans-Montana in 2020

Personal information
- Born: 28 September 1994 (age 32) Schwyz, Switzerland
- Height: 1.71 m (5 ft 7 in)
- Website: www.corinnesuter.ch

Skiing career
- Country: Switzerland
- Sport: Alpine skiing
- Club: Schwyz
- Disciplines: Downhill, super-G
- World Cup debut: 26 November 2011 (age 17)

Olympics
- Teams: 3 – (2018, 2022, 2026)
- Medals: 1 (1 gold)

World Championships
- Teams: 5 – (2017–2025)
- Medals: 5 (1 gold)

World Cup
- Seasons: 15 – (2012–2026)
- Wins: 6 – (4 DH, 2 SG)
- Podiums: 30 – (19 DH, 11 SG)
- Overall titles: 0 – (4th in 2020)
- Discipline titles: 2 – (DH & SG, 2020)
Medal record
Women's alpine skiing
Representing Switzerland
World Cup race podiums
Event	1st	2nd	3rd
Super-G	2	3	6
Downhill	4	6	9
Total	6	9	15
International competitions
Event	1st	2nd	3rd
Olympic Games	1	0	0
World Championships	1	2	2
Total	2	2	2
Olympic Games
Gold medal – first place	2022 Beijing	Downhill
World Championships
Gold medal – first place	2021 Cortina d'Ampezzo	Downhill
Silver medal – second place	2019 Åre	Downhill
Silver medal – second place	2021 Cortina d'Ampezzo	Super-G
Bronze medal – third place	2019 Åre	Super-G
Bronze medal – third place	2023 Méribel	Downhill
Junior World Championships
Gold medal – first place	2014 Jasná	Super-G
Gold medal – first place	2014 Jasná	Downhil
Silver medal – second place	2013 Quebec	Super-G
Bronze medal – third place	2012 Roccaraso	Combined

Corinne Suter (born 28 September 1994) is a Swiss World Cup alpine ski racer who specialises in the speed events of downhill and super-G.

== Career ==
Suter made her World Cup debut at age 17 in November 2011, and won season titles in downhill and super-G in 2020. She won the silver in downhill and bronze in super-G at the World Championships in 2019, and the gold medal in the downhill at both the 2021 World Championships and the 2022 Winter Olympics, followed by a bronze in the downhill at the 2023 World Championships.

== World Cup results ==
=== Season titles ===
- 2 titles – (1 Super-G, 1 Downhill)

Season
Season	Discipline
2020	Super-G
2020	Downhill

=== Season standings ===
Season
Season	Age	Overall	Slalom	Giant slalom	Super-G	Downhill	Combined
2015	20	117	—	—	54	48	—
2016	21	29	—	—	18	9	—
2017	22	33	—	—	13	15	41
2018	23	34	—	—	15	20	—
2019	24	18	—	—	16	6	—
2020	25	4	—	—	1st place, gold medalist(s)	1st place, gold medalist(s)	—
2021	26	8	—	30	3rd place, bronze medalist(s)	2nd place, silver medalist(s)	—N/a
2022	27	9	—	45	8	2nd place, silver medalist(s)	—N/a
2023	28	12	—	47	6	3rd place, bronze medalist(s)	—N/a
2024	29	55	—	—	20	28	—N/a
2025	30	18	—	—	8	10	—N/a
2026	31	18	—	—	11	11	—N/a

=== Race victories ===
- 6 wins – (4 DH, 2 SG)
- 30 podiums – (19 DH, 11 SG)

Season
Season	Date	Location	Discipline
2020	11 January 2020	Altenmarkt-Zauchensee, Austria	Downhill
2020	9 February 2020	Garmisch-Partenkirchen, Germany	Super-G
2021	18 December 2020	Val d'Isère, France	Downhill
2022	22 January 2022	Garmisch-Partenkirchen, Germany	Downhill
2023	4 December 2022	Lake Louise, Canada	Super-G
2026	27 February 2026	Soldeu, Andorra	Downhill

== World Championship results ==
Year
Year	Age	Slalom	Giant slalom	Super-G	Downhill	Combined	Team combined
2017	22	—	—	12	18	—	—N/a
2019	24	—	—	3	2	DNS2	—N/a
2021	26	—	18	2	1	—	—N/a
2023	28	—	—	20	3	—	—N/a
2025	30	—	—	14	7	—N/a	7

== Olympic results ==
Year
Year	Age	Slalom	Giant slalom	Super-G	Downhill	Combined	Team combined
2018	23	—	—	17	6	—	—N/a
2022	27	—	—	13	1	—	—N/a
2026	31	—	—	11	14	—N/a	9
