= 2022 Alpine Skiing World Cup – Women's super-G =

Alpine ski discipline year standings

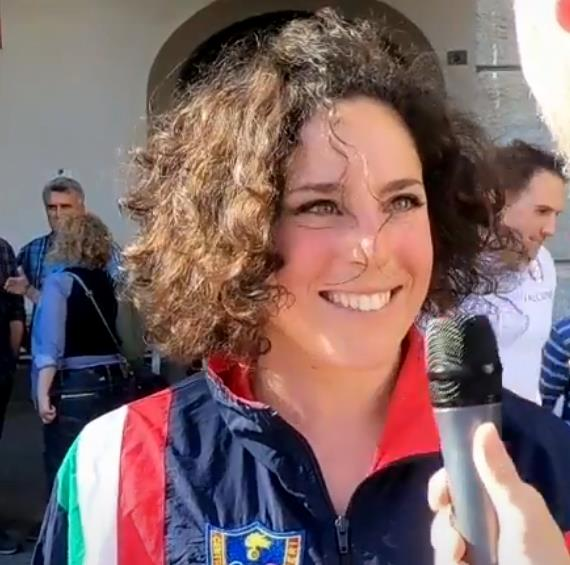
2022 Women's super-G World Cup: Federica Brignone of Italy, season champion; 2022 Women's World Cup; Overall • downhill • super-G; giant slalom • slalom • parallel
| Previous: 2021 | Next: 2023 |

The women's super-G in the 2022 FIS Alpine Skiing World Cup consisted of nine events including the final. Although no Italian woman had ever won the super-G championship, the battle in 2021-22 was between three of them: speed specialists Sofia Goggia and Elena Curtoni plus 2020 overall champion Federica Brignone. Through the first six races, Curtoni had won one, and each of the others had won two. However, Goggia was injured in a crash in the sixth race, in Cortina d'Ampezzo, and missed the next set of speed races as well as the super-G in the 2022 Winter Olympics. The seventh race, which was held days before the Winter Olympics, was skipped by many of the other top competitors, but was won by Brignone, enabling her to open a sizable lead in the discipline, and Brignone was able to clinch the season championship in the next Super-G when neither Curtoni nor Goggia scored points.

As noted above, the season was interrupted by the 2022 Winter Olympics in Beijing, China (at the Yanqing National Alpine Skiing Centre in Yanqing District) from 6–19 February 2022. Although the Alpine Skiing branch of the International Ski Federation (FIS) conducts the World Cup and co-organizes the Alpine skiing at the Winter Olympics (along with the International Olympic Committee {IOC)), the Winter Olympics are organized by nation (a maximum of four skiers is permitted per nation), and (after 1968) the Olympic results do not count for World Cup points. Accordingly, the results in the Olympics are highlighted in blue and shown in this table by ordinal position only in each discipline. The women's super-G was held at the "Rock" course on 11 February 2022.

The World Cup final was held on Thursday, 17 March in the linked resorts of Courchevel and Méribel, France, which are located in Les Trois Vallées, on the new L'Eclipse course at Courchevel. Only the top 25 skiers in the World Cup downhill discipline and the winner of the Junior World Championship, plus athletes who have scored at least 500 points in the World Cup overall classification for the season, are eligible to compete in the final, and only the top 15 earn World Cup points. Due to injuries, only 20 of the top 25 were able to compete, along with one 500+ point qualifier (Petra Vlhová) and the junior winner.

== Standings ==
| | Venue | 5 Dec 2021; Lake Louise | 11 Dec 2021; St. Moritz | 12 Dec 2021; St. Moritz | 19 Dec 2021; Val-d'Isère | 16 Jan 2022; Zauchensee | 23 Jan 2022; Cortina d'Ampezzo | 30 Jan 2022; Garmisch | 11 Feb 2022; Beijing | 5 Mar 2022; Lenzerheide | 17 Mar 2022; Courchevel | |
| # | Skier | (Canada) | (Switzerland) | (Switzerland) | (France) | (Austria) | (Italy) | (Germany) | (China) | (Switzerland) | (France) | Total |
| | (Italy) Federica Brignone | 45 | 32 | 100 | 50 | 100 | 50 | 100 | ⑦ | 29 | 0 | 506 |
| 2 | (Italy) Elena Curtoni | 36 | 40 | 80 | 60 | 32 | 100 | 26 | ⑩ | DNF | 16 | 390 |
| 3 | (United States) Mikaela Shiffrin | 40 | 60 | 60 | 45 | DNS | 15 | DNS | ⑨ | 80 | 80 | 380 |
| 4 | (Norway) Ragnhild Mowinckel | 22 | 50 | 6 | 80 | 14 | 36 | DNS | ⑥ | 45 | 100 | 353 |
| 5 | (Italy) Sofia Goggia | 100 | 80 | 40 | 100 | 12 | DNF | DNS | | | | 332 |
| 6 | (Switzerland) Lara Gut-Behrami | 80 | 100 | DNF | DNS | 26 | 20 | DNS | ① | 60 | DNF | 286 |
| 7 | (Austria) Tamara Tippler | 50 | 13 | DNF | 36 | 20 | 80 | 60 | ④ | DNF | 26 | 285 |
| 8 | (Switzerland) Corinne Suter | 14 | 10 | 5 | 40 | 80 | 45 | 32 | ⑬ | 11 | 40 | 277 |
| 9 | (France) Romane Miradoli | 4 | 24 | DNF | 26 | 16 | 20 | 40 | ⑪ | 100 | 45 | 275 |
| 10 | (Italy) Marta Bassino | DNS | 29 | 32 | 18 | 50 | 10 | 15 | ⑰ | 50 | 36 | 240 |
| 11 | (Austria) Mirjam Puchner | 60 | 12 | 10 | 10 | 18 | 26 | 50 | ② | DNF | 20 | 206 |
| 12 | (Switzerland) Michelle Gisin | DNS | 18 | 26 | 0 | DNS | 60 | DNS | ③ | 32 | 60 | 196 |
| 13 | (France) Tessa Worley | DNS | DNF | 0 | 5 | 45 | 40 | DNS | ⑲ | 40 | 50 | 180 |
| 14 | (Austria) Cornelia Hütter | 13 | 0 | 22 | 32 | DNS | 11 | 100 | ⑧ | DNS | | 178 |
| 15 | (Switzerland) Jasmine Flury | 9 | 26 | 36 | 4 | 24 | 24 | 9 | ⑫ | 12 | 29 | 173 |
| 16 | (Austria) Ramona Siebenhofer | 32 | 0 | 45 | 22 | 24 | 16 | DNS | | 4 | 22 | 165 |
| 17 | (Austria) Ariane Rädler | DNF | 45 | 14 | 20 | 60 | DNS | 24 | ⑳ | DNF | DNS | 163 |
| 18 | (Switzerland) Joana Hählen | 29 | 16 | 22 | DNS | 5 | 13 | 32 | DNS | 18 | 24 | 159 |
| 19 | (France) Laura Gauché | 0 | 15 | 11 | 14 | 45 | DNF | 6 | ⑯ | 29 | 32 | 152 |
| 20 | (New Zealand) Alice Robinson | 11 | 7 | 50 | DNS | 36 | 29 | DNS | DNF | DNF | 0 | 133 |
| 21 | (Germany) Kira Weidle | 6 | 12 | 2 | 15 | 15 | 22 | 11 | ⑮ | 36 | 0 | 119 |
| 22 | (Czech Republic) Ester Ledecká | 20 | DNS | | | 29 | 32 | DNS | ⑤ | 5 | 18 | 104 |
| 23 | (Austria) Nadine Fest | DNS | 4 | 8 | 8 | 10 | 14 | 45 | DNS | 7 | 0 | 96 |
| 24 | (United States) Breezy Johnson | 24 | 22 | 7 | 29 | DNS | | | | | | 82 |
| 25 | (Switzerland) Wendy Holdener | DNS | 36 | 9 | DNS | 7 | DNS | | | 24 | DNS | 76 |
| 26 | (Canada) Marie-Michèle Gagnon | 29 | 20 | DNF | 12 | 0 | DNF | 10 | ⑭ | DNF | NE | 71 |
| 27 | (Italy) Francesca Marsaglia | 18 | 6 | 29 | 2 | 3 | DNF | 2 | ㉒ | 8 | NE | 68 |
| 28 | (Switzerland) Jasmina Suter | DNS | DNF | 0 | 0 | 5 | 9 | 36 | DNS | 10 | NE | 60 |
| 29 | (France) Tiffany Gauthier | 5 | 5 | 24 | 3 | DNF | 12 | 8 | ㉘ | DNS | NE | 57 |
| | References | | | | | | | | | | | |

=== Legend ===
- Winner (100 points)
- 2nd place (80 points)
- 3rd place (60 points)
- DNF = Did Not Finish
- DSQ = Disqualified
- Did Not Start (DNS)
- Not Eligible for finals (NE)
- Race canceled (x)
- FIS non-World Cup race (Winter Olympics)
- Updated at 17 March 2022, after all events.

== See also ==
- 2022 Alpine Skiing World Cup – Women's summary rankings
- 2022 Alpine Skiing World Cup – Women's overall
- 2022 Alpine Skiing World Cup – Women's downhill
- 2022 Alpine Skiing World Cup – Women's giant slalom
- 2022 Alpine Skiing World Cup – Women's slalom
- 2022 Alpine Skiing World Cup – Women's parallel
- World Cup scoring system
