= Rock (ski course) =

Downhill ski course in Beijing, China

- Interactive map of Rock
- Location within China
- 40°32′30″N 115°48′09″E
- Location: Yanqing District, China
- Mountain: Xiaohaituo Mountain
- Resort: National Alpine Ski Centre
- Opened: 3 February 2022
- Architect: Bernhard Russi (main); Didier Defago (assistant)
- Level: expert

Downhill (men)
- Start: 2,179 m (7,149 ft) (AA)
- Finish: 1,285 m (4,216 ft)
- Vertical drop: 894 m (2,933 ft)
- Length: 3.152 km (1.96 mi)
- Max incline: 34.2 degrees (68%)

Downhill (women)
- Start: 2,050 m (6,726 ft) (AA)
- Finish: 1,285 m (4,216 ft)
- Vertical drop: 765 m (2,510 ft)
- Length: 2.704 km (1.68 mi)

Rock (Chinese: 岩石; pinyin: yán shí) is the Olympic downhill ski course in China, located in Yanqing District, part of National Alpine Ski Centre resort, opened in 2022.

It is approximately 90 kilometres (56 mi) northwest of Beijing, which hosted the speed alpine skiing events of the 2022 Winter Olympics. The course was designed by Bernhard Russi, assisted by Didier Defago; both are Olympic downhill champions (1972, 2010) from Switzerland. According to Russi, "Rock" is most similar to the "Birds of Prey" course in the United States, located at Beaver Creek, Colorado.

This course has a very unusual terrain configuration, which has no resemblance to any other top level course around the world, as it runs mostly along the top of the ridge and in the canyon in bottom part.

== History ==
Bernhard Russi, a retired Swiss downhill racer and course architect who planned and constructed six Olympic downhill courses, designed this steep and unusual course for seven years.

Two years prior to the Olympics, men's World Cup events (downhill, super-G) were scheduled for this course in February 2020, but were cancelled due to the COVID-19 pandemic.

On 7 February 2022, Beat Feuz took the gold medal at downhill, his last missing trophy, at premiere competition on this course. Adrian Smiseth Sejersted set the course top speed record at 139.7 km/h (86.8 mph).

== Olympics ==
=== Men ===
Date	Type	Gold	Silver	Bronze
7 February 2022	DH	(Switzerland) Beat Feuz	(France) Johan Clarey	(Austria) Matthias Mayer
8 February 2022	SG	(Austria) Matthias Mayer	(United States) Ryan Cochran-Siegle	(Norway) Aleksander Aamodt Kilde
10 February 2022	AC	(Austria) Johannes Strolz	(Norway) Aleksander Aamodt Kilde	(Canada) James Crawford

- Slalom in men's Alpine combined event was held on "Ice River" course.

=== Women ===
Date	Type	Gold	Silver	Bronze
11 February 2022	SG	(Switzerland) Lara Gut-Behrami	(Austria) Mirjam Puchner	(Switzerland) Michelle Gisin
15 February 2022	DH	(Switzerland) Corinne Suter	(Italy) Sofia Goggia	(Italy) Nadia Delago
17 February 2022	AC	(Switzerland) Michelle Gisin	(Switzerland) Wendy Holdener	(Italy) Federica Brignone

- Slalom in women's Alpine combined event was held on "Ice River" course.

== World Cup ==
=== Men ===
Date	Type	Winner	Second	Third
15 February 2020	DH	cancelled due to the COVID-19 pandemic		
16 February 2020	SG	cancelled due to the COVID-19 pandemic		

== Profile ==
Course is very wavy and curvy in the upper section, very steep in midsection, and gliding part in bottom section. Course has long and fast curves, steep transitions and four big jumps.

=== Course sections ===
- Start, High Cloud, Pine Forest, White Face, Galleria, Dwen Dwen jump, Silk Road, Sugar jump, Roller Coaster, Rhon Rhon jump, Haituo Bowl, Canyon, Cliff jump, Finish.
