= Alpine skiing at the 2022 Winter Olympics – Men's combined =

Men's combined at the XXIV Olympic Winter Games
- Alpine skiing
- Venue: Rock (DH) / Ice River (SL), Yanqing District
- Date: 10 February 2022
- Competitors: 27 from 17 nations
- Winning time: 2:31.43

Medalists
1st place, gold medalist(s)		Johannes Strolz	Austria
2nd place, silver medalist(s)		Aleksander Aamodt Kilde	Norway
3rd place, bronze medalist(s)		James Crawford	Canada

The men's combined competition of the Beijing 2022 Olympics was held on 10 February, on "Rock" and "Ice River" courses at the Yanqing National Alpine Ski Centre in Yanqing District. Johannes Strolz of Austria became the champion, winning the first Olympic medal. Aleksander Aamodt Kilde of Norway won the silver medal. James Crawford won bronze, also his first Olympic medal.

The 2018 champion, Marcel Hirscher, retired from competitions. The silver medalist, Alexis Pinturault, qualified for the Olympics, and the bronze medalist, Victor Muffat-Jeandet, did not qualify. Marco Schwarz was the 2021 world champion, with Pinturault and Loïc Meillard being the silver and bronze medalists, respectively.

Kilde won the downhill part, and Crawford was second, but they only posted the sixth and seventh results in slalom, respectively. Strolz, who was the fourth in the downhill, won the slalom, and this was good enough for the gold medal.

Barnabás Szőllős' 6th placed finish equaled the best ever result by an Israeli at the Winter Olympics.

== Schedule ==
Date	Event	Winner
9 February 2022	Official training 1 (DH)	
10 February 2022	Competition	

== Results ==
Results were as follows:

Rank	Bib	Name	Nation	Downhill	Rank	Slalom	Rank	Total	Behind
1st place, gold medalist(s)	6	Johannes Strolz	Austria	1:43.87	4	47.56	1	2:31.43	
2nd place, silver medalist(s)	10	Aleksander Aamodt Kilde	Norway	1:43.12	1	48.90	6	2:32.02	+0.59
3rd place, bronze medalist(s)	11	James Crawford	Canada	1:43.14	2	48.97	7	2:32.11	+0.68
4	9	Justin Murisier	Switzerland	1:44.14	6	48.15	3	2:32.29	+0.86
5	5	Marco Schwarz	Austria	1:44.07	5	48.64	4	2:32.71	+1.28
6	1	Barnabás Szőllős	Israel	1:45.04	11	48.14	2	2:33.18	+1.75
7	18	Raphael Haaser	Austria	1:44.63	10	48.64	4	2:33.27	+1.84
8	7	Broderick Thompson	Canada	1:44.39	8	49.81	8	2:34.20	+2.77
9	21	Brodie Seger	Canada	1:43.54	3	51.49	10	2:35.03	+3.60
10	12	Christof Innerhofer	Italy	1:44.19	7	51.61	11	2:35.80	+4.37
11	14	Marco Pfiffner	Liechtenstein	1:45.11	13	51.29	9	2:36.40	+4.97
12	4	Jack Gower	Ireland	1:45.16	14	52.58	12	2:37.74	+6.31
13	27	Arnaud Alessandria	Monaco	1:45.79	15	58.41	16	2:44.20	+12.77
14	22	Ivan Kovbasnyuk	Ukraine	1:49.13	21	55.30	14	2:44.43	+13.00
15	25	Albin Tahiri	Kosovo	1:52.44	22	55.85	15	2:48.29	+16.86
16	23	Zhang Yangming	China	1:55.25	23	54.47	13	2:49.72	+18.29
17	26	Xu Mingfu	China	1:55.32	24	1:05.08	17	3:00.40	+28.97
	3	Jan Zabystřan	Czech Republic	1:44.54	9	DNF	—N/a		
	13	Alexis Pinturault	France	1:45.04	11	DNF	—N/a		
	17	Simon Jocher	Germany	1:45.80	16	DNF	—N/a		
	15	Loïc Meillard	Switzerland	1:45.91	17	DNF	—N/a		
	24	Henrik Von Appen	Chile	1:46.51	18	DNF	—N/a		
	19	Trevor Philp	Canada	1:46.84	19	DNF	—N/a		
	16	Luca Aerni	Switzerland	1:47.03	20	DNF	—N/a		
	2	Miha Hrobat	Slovenia	DNF	—N/a				
	8	Nejc Naraločnik	Slovenia	DNF	—N/a				
	20	Yannick Chabloz	Switzerland	DNF	—N/a				
