= Serbia at the 2022 Winter Olympics =

- Flag of Serbia
- IOC code: SRB
- NOC: Olympic Committee of Serbia
- Website: www.oks.org.rs (in Serbian)

in Beijing, China 4–20 February 2022
- Competitors: 2 (1 man and 1 woman) in 1 sport
- Flag bearer (opening): Marko Vukićević
- Flag bearer (closing): Volunteer
- Medals: Gold 0 Silver 0 Bronze 0 Total 0

Winter Olympics appearances (overview)
- 2010; 2014; 2018; 2022; 2026

Other related appearances
- Yugoslavia (1924–1992); Serbia and Montenegro (1998–2006)

Serbia competed at the 2022 Winter Olympics in Beijing, China, from 4 to 20 February 2022.

Serbia's team consisted of two athletes (one per gender) competing in alpine skiing.

Marko Vukićević was the country's flagbearer during the opening ceremony. Meanwhile a volunteer was the flagbearer during the closing ceremony.

== Competitors ==
The following is the list of number of competitors participating at the Games per sport/discipline.

Sport	Men	Women	Total
Alpine skiing	1	1	2
Total	1	1	2

== Alpine skiing ==
By meeting the basic qualification standards, Serbia has qualified one male and one female alpine skier.

Athlete	Event	Run 1		Run 2		Total	
Athlete	Event	Time	Rank	Time	Rank	Time	Rank
Marko Vukićević	Men's downhill	—				DNF	
Marko Vukićević	Men's super-G	—				1:29.45	34
Nevena Ignjatović	Women's downhill	—				1:40.73	30
Nevena Ignjatović	Women's combined	1:37.02	22	DSQ			

== Non-competing sports ==
=== Cross-country skiing ===
By meeting the basic qualification standards, Serbia had qualified one male and two female cross-country skiers.
