= Alpine skiing at the 2022 Winter Olympics – Men's downhill =

Men's downhill at the XXIV Olympic Winter Games
- Alpine skiing
- Venue: Rock, Yanqing District
- Date: 7 February 2022
- Competitors: 42 from 20 nations
- Winning time: 1:42.69

Medalists
1st place, gold medalist(s)		Beat Feuz	Switzerland
2nd place, silver medalist(s)		Johan Clarey	France
3rd place, bronze medalist(s)		Matthias Mayer	Austria

Men's Downhill
- Location: "Rock" course Yanqing National Alpine Ski Centre
- Vertical: 894 m (2,933 ft)
- Top elevation: 2,179 m (7,149 ft)
- Base elevation: 1,285 m (4,216 ft)

The men's downhill competition of the Beijing 2022 Olympics was held on Monday, 7 February, at Yanqing National Alpine Ski Centre ski resort in Yanqing District. Beat Feuz of Switzerland was the champion, Johan Clarey of France was the silver medalist, and Matthias Mayer of Austria took the bronze. This was the first Olympic gold for Feuz and the first Olympic medal for Clarey. The men's downhill at the Olympics has yet to have a repeat champion. At the age of 41, Clarey became the oldest medalist in Olympic alpine skiing history.

The 2018 Olympic champion, Aksel Lund Svindal, retired from competitive skiing. Prior to the Olympics, eight World Cup downhill events were held: Aleksander Aamodt Kilde was leading the ranking, followed by Feuz, Mayer (2014 downhill and 2018 Super-G Olympic champion), and Marco Odermatt. Vincent Kriechmayr was the reigning world champion.

The "Rock" course was 3.152 km (1.96 mi) in length, with a vertical drop of 894 m (2,933 ft) from a starting elevation of 2,179 m (7,149 ft) above sea level. Feuz had an average speed of 110.499 km/h (68.7 mph) and an average vertical descent rate of 8.706 m/s (28.6 ft/s).

== Schedule ==
The event was scheduled for Sunday, 6 February, but was postponed one day due to strong winds.

== Results ==
The race was started at 12:00 local time, (UTC+8). At the starting gate, the skies were partly cloudy, the temperature was −13.4 °C (8 °F), and the snow condition was hard packed.

Rank	Bib	Name	Country	Time	Behind
1st place, gold medalist(s)	13	Beat Feuz	Switzerland	1:42.69	—
2nd place, silver medalist(s)	19	Johan Clarey	France	1:42.79	+0.10
3rd place, bronze medalist(s)	9	Matthias Mayer	Austria	1:42.85	+0.16
4	12	James Crawford	Canada	1:42.92	+0.23
5	11	Aleksander Aamodt Kilde	Norway	1:43.20	+0.51
6	15	Dominik Paris	Italy	1:43.21	+0.52
7	17	Marco Odermatt	Switzerland	1:43.40	+0.71
8	1	Vincent Kriechmayr	Austria	1:43.45	+0.76
9	20	Max Franz	Austria	1:43.52	+0.83
10	23	Boštjan Kline	Slovenia	1:43.75	+1.06
11	22	Adrian Smiseth Sejersted	Norway	1:43.82	+1.13
11	25	Maxence Muzaton	France	1:43.82	+1.13
13	14	Romed Baumann	Germany	1:43.84	+1.15
14	16	Ryan Cochran-Siegle	United States	1:43.91	+1.22
15	8	Matteo Marsaglia	Italy	1:44.06	+1.37
16	7	Niels Hintermann	Switzerland	1:44.08	+1.39
17	32	Adur Etxezarreta	Spain	1:44.12	+1.43
17	6	Andreas Sander	Germany	1:44.12	+1.43
19	3	Bryce Bennett	United States	1:44.25	+1.56
20	18	Travis Ganong	United States	1:44.39	+1.70
21	5	Daniel Hemetsberger	Austria	1:44.59	+1.90
22	29	Brodie Seger	Canada	1:44.68	+1.99
23	26	Josef Ferstl	Germany	1:44.69	+2.00
24	28	Miha Hrobat	Slovenia	1:44.71	+2.02
25	24	Stefan Rogentin	Switzerland	1:44.95	+2.26
26	27	Blaise Giezendanner	France	1:45.00	+2.31
27	10	Matthieu Bailet	France	1:45.23	+2.54
28	31	Marco Pfiffner	Liechtenstein	1:45.79	+3.10
29	36	Arnaud Alessandria	Monaco	1:46.25	+3.56
30	41	Barnabás Szőllős	Israel	1:46.88	+4.19
31	37	Jack Gower	Ireland	1:47.61	+4.92
32	35	Henrik Von Appen	Chile	1:47.69	+5.00
33	39	Ivan Kovbasnyuk	Ukraine	1:48.09	+5.40
34	40	Simon Breitfuss Kammerlander	Bolivia	1:48.26	+5.57
35	43	Albin Tahiri	Kosovo	1:52.44	+9.75
36	42	Xu Mingfu	China	1:56.93	+14.24
	2	Dominik Schwaiger	Germany	Did not finish	
	4	Christof Innerhofer	Italy	Did not finish	
	21	Broderick Thompson	Canada	Did not finish	
	33	Marko Vukićević	Serbia	Did not finish	
	34	Nejc Naraločnik	Slovenia	Did not finish	
	38	Zhang Yangming	China	Did not finish	
	30	Kjetil Jansrud	Norway	Did not start	
