= Ice River (ski course) =

Technical ski course in Beijing, China

- Interactive map of Ice River
- Location within China
- 40°32′30″N 115°48′09″E
- Location: Yanqing District, China
- Mountain: Xiaohaituo Mountain
- Resort: National Alpine Ski Centre
- Opened: 7 February 2022

Giant slalom
- Start: 1,925 m (6,316 ft) (AA)
- Finish: 1,501 m (4,925 ft)
- Vertical drop: 424 m (1,391 ft)

Slalom
- Start: 1,712 m (5,617 ft) (AA)
- Finish: 1,501 m (4,925 ft)
- Vertical drop: 211 m (692 ft)

Ice River is the Olympic technical ski course in China, located in Yanqing District, part of National Alpine Ski Centre resort, opened in 2022.

It is approximately 90 kilometres (56 mi) northwest of Beijing. It has hosted the technical alpine skiing events of the 2022 Winter Olympics.

== History ==
On 7 February 2022, premiere event was held on this course with women's olympic giant slalom event. Swedish skier Sara Hector, who was leading in the discipline the season, won gold. Mikaela Shiffrin did not finish the first run and Petra Vlhová reached 8th place.

On 9 February 2022, Petra Vlhová, won a gold medal at women's olympic slalom, the only missing title in her career. Mikaela Shiffrin again did not finish the 1st run.

== Olympics ==
=== Women ===
Location in China

Date	Type	Gold	Silver	Bronze
7 February 2022	GS	(Sweden) Sara Hector	(Italy) Federica Brignone	(Switzerland) Lara Gut-Behrami
9 February 2022	SL	(Slovakia) Petra Vlhová	(Austria) Katharina Liensberger	(Switzerland) Wendy Holdener
17 February 2022	AC	(Switzerland) Michelle Gisin	(Switzerland) Wendy Holdener	(Italy) Federica Brignone

- Downhill in women's Alpine combined event was held on "Rock" course.

=== Men ===
Date	Type	Gold	Silver	Bronze
10 February 2022	AC	(Austria) Johannes Strolz	(Norway) Aleksander Aamodt Kilde	(Canada) James Crawford
13 February 2022	GS	(Switzerland) Marco Odermatt	(Slovenia) Žan Kranjec	(France) Mathieu Faivre
16 February 2022	SL	(France) Clément Noël	(Austria) Johannes Strolz	(Norway) Sebastian Foss-Solevåg

- Downhill in men's Alpine combined event was held on "Rock" course.
