= Alpine skiing at the 2022 Winter Olympics – Women's downhill =

Women's downhill at the XXIV Olympic Winter Games
- Alpine skiing
- Venue: Rock, Yanqing District
- Date: 15 February 2022
- Competitors: 36 from 17 nations
- Winning time: 1:31.87

Medalists
1st place, gold medalist(s)		Corinne Suter	Switzerland
2nd place, silver medalist(s)		Sofia Goggia	Italy
3rd place, bronze medalist(s)		Nadia Delago	Italy

Women's downhill
- Location: "Rock" course Yanqing National Alpine Ski Centre
- Vertical: 765 m (2,510 ft)
- Top elevation: 2,050 m (6,726 ft)
- Base elevation: 1,285 m (4,216 ft)

The women's downhill competition of the Beijing 2022 Olympics was held on 15 February, on the "Rock" course at Yanqing National Alpine Ski Centre ski resort in Yanqing District. Corinne Suter of Switzerland, the reigning world champion, won the event, which was her first Olympic medal. Defending champion Sofia Goggia of Italy won silver, and Nadia Delago of Italy took bronze, also her first Olympic medal.

Defending silver medalist Ragnhild Mowinckel competed, but bronze medalist Lindsey Vonn had retired from competition. Prior to the Olympics, six World Cup downhill events were held; Goggia was leading the ranking, followed by Suter and Ramona Siebenhofer.

The "Rock" course was 2.704 km (1.68 mi) in length, with a vertical drop of 765 m (2,510 ft) from a starting elevation of 2,050 m (6,726 ft) above sea level. Suter's winning time of 91.87 seconds yielded an average speed of 105.958 km/h (65.8 mph) and an average vertical descent rate of 8.327 m/s (27.3 ft/s).

== Results ==
The race started at 11:30 local time, (UTC+8), delayed a half hour due to gusting winds. At the starting gate, the skies were variable, the temperature was −21.6 °C (−7 °F), and the snow condition was hard packed.

Rank	Bib	Name	Country	Time	Deficit
1st place, gold medalist(s)	15	Corinne Suter	Switzerland	1:31.87	—
2nd place, silver medalist(s)	13	Sofia Goggia	Italy	1:32.03	+0.16
3rd place, bronze medalist(s)	11	Nadia Delago	Italy	1:32.44	+0.57
4	17	Kira Weidle	Germany	1:32.58	+0.71
5	1	Elena Curtoni	Italy	1:32.87	+1.00
6	4	Joana Hählen	Switzerland	1:33.16	+1.29
7	18	Cornelia Hütter	Austria	1:33.35	+1.48
8	8	Marie-Michèle Gagnon	Canada	1:33.45	+1.58
8	9	Mirjam Puchner	Austria	1:33.45	+1.58
10	16	Laura Gauché	France	1:33.47	+1.60
11	10	Nicol Delago	Italy	1:33.69	+1.82
12	7	Ramona Siebenhofer	Austria	1:33.81	+1.94
13	2	Romane Miradoli	France	1:33.93	+2.06
14	6	Ragnhild Mowinckel	Norway	1:33.97	+2.10
15	3	Jasmine Flury	Switzerland	1:34.00	+2.13
16	19	Lara Gut-Behrami	Switzerland	1:34.03	+2.16
17	26	Keely Cashman	United States	1:34.13	+2.26
18	12	Mikaela Shiffrin	United States	1:34.36	+2.49
19	20	Tamara Tippler	Austria	1:34.39	+2.52
20	25	Julia Pleshkova	ROC	1:34.48	+2.61
21	30	Jacqueline Wiles	United States	1:34.60	+2.73
22	14	Ilka Štuhec	Slovenia	1:34.88	+3.01
23	29	Maruša Ferk Saioni	Slovenia	1:34.99	+3.12
24	31	Roni Remme	Canada	1:35.36	+3.49
25	23	Alice Robinson	New Zealand	1:35.57	+3.70
26	28	Greta Small	Australia	1:36.53	+4.66
27	5	Ester Ledecká	Czech Republic	1:38.18	+6.31
28	33	Tereza Nová	Czech Republic	1:39.38	+7.51
29	35	Barbora Nováková	Czech Republic	1:39.50	+7.63
30	34	Nevena Ignjatović	Serbia	1:40.73	+8.86
31	36	Kong Fanying	China	1:44.53	+12.66
	21	Alix Wilkinson	United States	DNF	
	22	Tiffany Gauthier	France	DNF	
	24	Elvedina Muzaferija	Bosnia and Herzegovina	DNF	
	27	Camille Cerutti	France	DNF	
	32	Cande Moreno	Andorra	DNF	
