= 2022 Alpine Skiing World Cup – Women's giant slalom =

Alpine ski discipline year standings

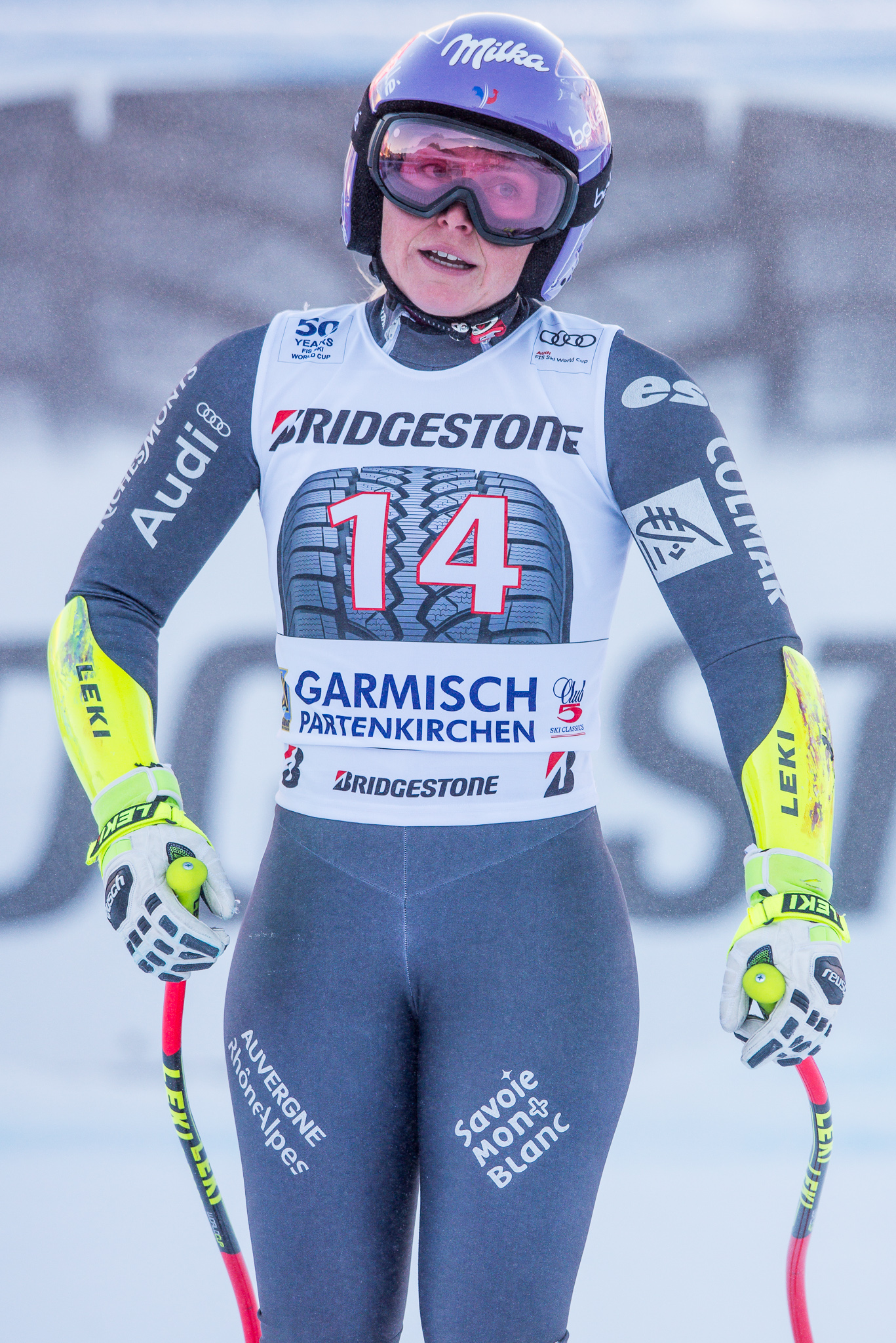
2022 Women's giant slalom World Cup: Tessa Worley of France, season champion; 2022 Women's World Cup; Overall • downhill • super-G; giant slalom • slalom • parallel
Previous: 2021	Next: 2023

The women's giant slalom World Cup 2021/2022 consisted of 9 events including the final. Overall World Cup leader Mikaela Shiffrin from the United States, who started out in the early lead in this discipline, contracted COVID-19 at the end of 2021 and missed the post-Christmas giant slalom, then Shiffrin lost the lead in this discipline to Sara Hector of Sweden in the first race in 2022.

As noted above, the season was interrupted by the 2022 Winter Olympics in Beijing, China (at the Yanqing National Alpine Skiing Centre in Yanqing District) from 6–19 February 2022. Although the Alpine Skiing branch of the International Ski Federation (FIS) conducts the World Cup and co-organizes the Alpine skiing at the Winter Olympics (along with the International Olympic Committee {IOC)), the Winter Olympics are organized by nation (a maximum of four skiers is permitted per nation), and (after 1968) the Olympic results do not count for World Cup points. Accordingly, the results in the Olympics are highlighted in blue and shown in this table by ordinal position only in each discipline. The women's giant slalom was held at the "Ice River" course on 7 February 2022.

Hector continued to hold the lead in the discipline into March, as 2017 discipline champion Tessa Worley of France emerged as her main late-season competition. Going into the final, Hector held only a five point lead over Worley. Shiffrin held a huge lead of almost a second after the first run and seemed likely to win the title, but she shockingly melted down in the second run, finishing seventh and handing the season title to Worley.

The World Cup final was held on Sunday, 20 March in the linked resorts of Courchevel and Méribel, France, which are located in Les Trois Vallées, on the Roc de Fer course at Méribel. Only the top 25 skiers in the World Cup giant slalom discipline and the winner of the Junior World Championship, plus athletes who have scored at least 500 points in the World Cup overall classification for the season, were eligible to compete in the final, and only the top 15 earned World Cup points.

== Standings ==
	Venue	23 Oct 2021; Sölden	21 Dec 2021; Courchevel	22 Dec 2021; Courchevel	28 Dec 2021; Lienz	08 Jan 2022; Kranjska Gora	25 Jan 2022; Kronplatz	7 Feb 2022; Beijing	06 Mar 2022; Lenzerheide	11 Mar 2022; Åre	20 Mar 2022; Méribel	
#	Skier	(Austria)	(France)	(France)	(Austria)	(Slovenia)	(Italy)	(China)	(Switzerland)	(Sweden)	(France)	Total
	(France) Tessa Worley	32	45	50	100	80	60	DNF2	100	50	50	567
2	(Sweden) Sara Hector	22	80	100	60	100	100	①	60	DNF2	18	540
3	(United States) Mikaela Shiffrin	100	100	80	DNS	36	45	DNF1	50	60	36	507
4	(Slovakia) Petra Vlhová	60	50	45	80	16	80	⑭	DNF1	100	60	491
5	(Italy) Marta Bassino	DNF1	DNF1	60	40	60	36	DNF1	DNF1	80	80	356
6	(Italy) Federica Brignone	DNF2	36	DNF2	50	DNS	50	②	80	DNF1	100	316
7	(Norway) Ragnhild Mowinckel	13	20	32	45	6	32	⑤	36	24	45	253
8	(Switzerland) Michelle Gisin	6	60	26	10	26	5	⑩	45	29	40	247
9	(Poland) Maryna Gasienica-Daniel	DNF1	40	40	DNS	40	26	⑧	15	26	32	219
10	(Austria) Katharina Truppe	4	24	24	29	24	22	④	24	32	20	203
11	(France) Coralie Frasse Sombet	10	14	10	20	13	13	⑰	29	36	22	167
12	(Canada) Valérie Grenier	36	DNS			50	24	DNF1	DNF1	20	29	159
13	(Switzerland) Lara Gut-Behrami	80	DNS			45	DNS	③	DNS		29	154
14	(Austria) Ramona Siebenhofer	26	32	36	24	12	DNS	DNF2	10	DNF2	0	140
15	(Austria) Ricarda Haaser	16	5	16	13	18	DNQ	DNS	14	45	DNF2	127
16	(Switzerland) Camille Rast	DNQ	29	22	36	DNS	10	⑯	22	DNF1	DNS	119
17	(Norway) Thea Louise Stjernesund	12	DNQ	DNQ	14	DNS	40	⑥	13	13	24	116
18	(Norway) Maria Therese Tviberg	45	12	11	DNF2	15	DNF2	⑫	18	14	0	115
19	(Norway) Mina Fürst Holtmann	2	26	18	32	2	18	DNF1	DNS	DNF1	16	114
20	(Slovenia) Meta Hrovat	40	DNF1	DNF2	26	29	15	⑦	DNF2	DNS		110
21	(Austria) Katharina Liensberger	50	DNS		6	DNQ	8	⑮	40	DNF1	0	104
22	(United States) Paula Moltzan	8	15	20	9	DNF2	14	⑫	26	9	0	101
23	(Slovenia) Ana Bucik	DNQ	22	DNF2	15	22	29	⑪	DNF1	11	0	99
24	(Austria) Stephanie Brunner	14	18	29	DNF1	DNS	DNF2	DNF1	DNF1	15	0	76
25	(Switzerland) Wendy Holdener	DNS	13	15	DNF2	14	DNS	⑨	32	DNF2	0	74
26	(Switzerland) Andrea Ellenberger	7	DNF1	6	12	20	12	DNS	DNF2	12	NE	69
27	(Switzerland) Simone Wild	DNQ	10	13	DNQ	11	3	DNS	8	22	NE	67
28	(Austria) Katharina Huber	DNQ	DNF2	14	16	8	DNQ	DNS	9	16	NE	63
29	(United States) Nina O'Brien	29	16	DNF1	DNQ	DNQ	16	DSQ2	DNS		NE	61
30	(Slovenia) Andreja Slokar	18	9	7	DNF2	DNS	4	DNF1	16	4	NE	58
31	(Slovenia) Tina Robnik	9	DNS		DNQ	32	6	⑱	DNF2	10	NE	57
	References											

=== Legend ===
- Winner (100 points)
- 2nd place (80 points)
- 3rd place (60 points)
- DNQ = Did not qualify for run 2
- DNF1 = Did not finish run 1
- DSQ1 = Disqualified run 1
- DNF2 = Did not finish run 2
- DSQ2 = Disqualified run 2
- DNS2 = Did not start run 2
- Did not start (DNS)
- Not eligible for finals (NE)
- Race canceled (x)
- FIS non-World Cup race (Winter Olympics)
- Updated at 20 March 2022, after all events.

== See also ==
- 2021–22 World Cup – Women's rankings
- 2022 Alpine Skiing World Cup – Women's overall
- 2022 Alpine Skiing World Cup – Women's downhill
- 2022 Alpine Skiing World Cup – Women's super-G
- 2022 Alpine Skiing World Cup – Women's slalom
- 2022 Alpine Skiing World Cup – Women's parallel
