= 2022 Alpine Skiing World Cup – Women's slalom =

Alpine ski discipline year standings

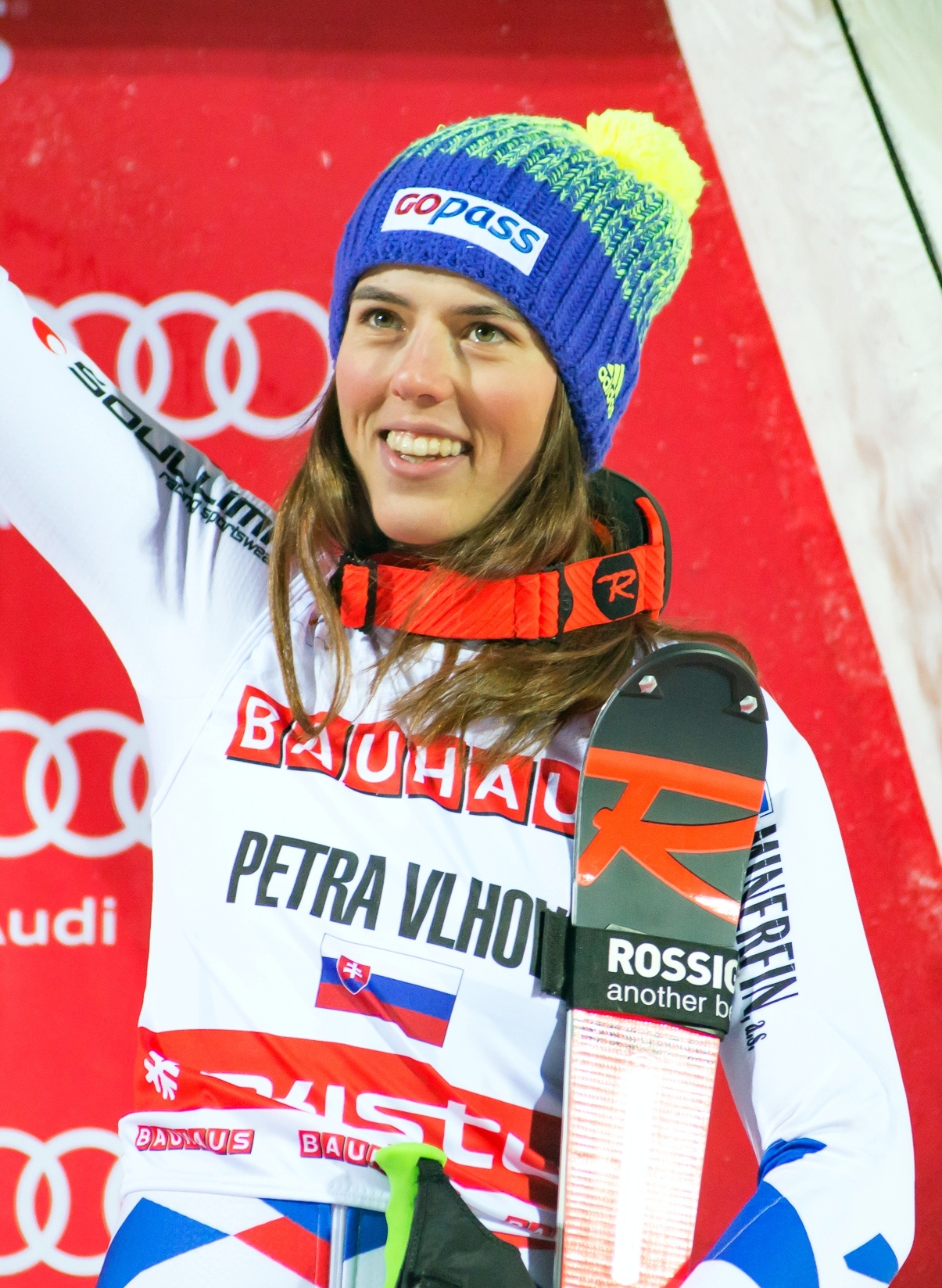
2022 Women's slalom World Cup: Petra Vlhová of Slovakia, season champion; 2022 Women's World Cup; Overall • downhill • super-G; giant slalom • slalom • parallel
Previous: 2021	Next: 2023

The women's slalom in the 2022 FIS Alpine Skiing World Cup consisted of 9 events, including the final.

2020 discipline champion Petra Vlhová of Slovakia jumped out to the early lead in the discipline standings and was able to separate from her closest competitor, six-time champion Mikaela Shiffrin of the United States, when Shiffrin had to miss time at the end of December due to contracting the COVID-19 virus. Vlhová won five of the first six slaloms during the season and finished second in the other. Although Shiffrin won the next race on 11 January in Schladming and set a career record for World Cup victories in any discipline with her 47th slalom victory, Vlhová finished second and, with a 220-point lead and just two more races scheduled on the slalom calendar for 2021-22, she clinched the season crystal globe in slalom over two months before the end of the season.

As noted above, the season was interrupted by the 2022 Winter Olympics in Beijing, China (at the Yanqing National Alpine Skiing Centre in Yanqing District) from 6–19 February 2022. Although the Alpine Skiing branch of the International Ski Federation (FIS) conducts the World Cup and co-organizes the Alpine skiing at the Winter Olympics (along with the International Olympic Committee {IOC)), the Winter Olympics are organized by nation (a maximum of four skiers is permitted per nation), and (after 1968) the Olympic results do not count for World Cup points. Accordingly, the results in the Olympics are highlighted in blue and shown in this table by ordinal position only in each discipline. The women's slalom was held at the "Ice River" course on 9 February 2022.

The World Cup final was held on Saturday, 19 March in the linked resorts of Courchevel and Méribel, France, which are located in Les Trois Vallées, on the Roc de Fer course at Méribel. Only the top 25 skiers in the World Cup giant slalom discipline and the winner of the Junior World Championship, plus athletes who have scored at least 500 points in the World Cup overall classification for the season, are eligible to compete in the final, and only the top 15 earn World Cup points. 2022 World Junior champion Zrinka Ljutić of Croatia surprisingly finished fifth in the final.

== Standings ==
	Venue	20 Nov 2021; Levi	21 Nov 2021; Levi	28 Nov 2021; Killington	29 Dec 2021; Lienz	04 Jan 2022; Zagreb	09 Jan 2022; Kranjska Gora	11 Jan 2022; Schladming	9 Feb 2022; Beijing	12 Mar 2022; Åre	19 Mar 2022; Méribel	
#	Skier	(Finland)	(Finland)	(United States)	(Austria)	(Croatia)	(Slovenia)	(Austria)	(China)	(Sweden)	(France)	Total
	(Slovakia) Petra Vlhová	100	100	80	100	100	100	80	①	50	60	770
2	(United States) Mikaela Shiffrin	80	80	100	DNS	80	DNF2	100	DNF1	29	32	501
3	(Germany) Lena Dürr	60	60	45	13	24	50	60	④	45	80	437
4	(Austria) Katharina Liensberger	40	32	50	80	60	DNF2	10	②	100	20	392
5	(Switzerland) Wendy Holdener	36	50	60	45	50	80	DNF2	③	DNS	36	357
6	(Slovenia) Ana Bucik	24	36	22	10	32	45	22	⑪	36	50	277
7	(Switzerland) Michelle Gisin	32	45	24	60	26	DNF1	DNF1	⑥	60	DNF2	247
8	(Slovenia) Andreja Slokar	50	16	26	7	DNF2	DNS		⑤	26	100	225
9	(Austria) Katharina Truppe	9	29	18	50	15	36	DNS	DNF1	40	22	219
10	(Sweden) Anna Swenn-Larsson	45	24	29	24	DSQ2	60	DNF1	⑨	DNF2	26	208
11	(Canada) Ali Nullmeyer	18	DNF1	DNQ	12	45	40	DNF2	㉑	20	40	175
	(Sweden) Sara Hector	29	22	40	26	18	26	14	DNF2	DNS		175
13	(Norway) Mina Fürst Holtmann	DNF1	DNF1	3	32	DNF2	22	36	DNF2	80	DNF1	173
14	(Croatia) Leona Popović	13	18	10	18	36	11	40	㉓	DNF2	DNF1	146
15	(Canada) Laurence St. Germain	14	DNF2	20	29	DNF1	9	32	⑰	11	24	139
16	(Austria) Katharina Huber	22	26	DSQ2	16	9	24	16	⑫	18	DNF2	131
17	(Czech Republic) Martina Dubovská	20	40	13	22	DNF1	DNF1	13	⑬	16	0	124
18	(Austria) Katharina Gallhuber	4	DNQ	DNQ	40	40	32	DNQ	⑭	6	DSQ1	122
	(United States) Paula Moltzan	DNF2	7	36	11	24	20	DNF2	⑧	24	0	122
20	(Switzerland) Camille Rast	DNQ	5	15	36	DNS		50	⑦	DNS	0	106
21	(Canada) Amelia Smart	DNQ	DNQ	DNQ	DNQ	11	20	29	㉗	15	29	104
22	(Canada) Erin Mielzynski	11	10	11	20	DNF2	29	DNF2	⑯	3	16	100
23	(France) Nastasia Noens	5	4	12	DNF2	20	15	15	⑲	9	18	98
24	(Norway) Maria Therese Tviberg	DNF2	DNF2	32	DNF2	29	DNF1	26	DNF1	8	DNF1	95
25	(Austria) Chiara Mair	12	DNQ	6	8	DNF2	12	50	DNS	DNF1	0	88
26	(United Kingdom) Charlie Guest	DNQ	11	8	DNF2	12	13	20	㉑	4	NE	68
27	(Norway) Thea Louise Stjernesund	26	22	4	DNQ	DNS		DNQ	⑮	8	NE	60
28	(Germany) Emma Aicher	18	8	DNQ	DNF1	DNF2	20	DNF2	⑱	13	NE	59
29	(Sweden) Charlotta Säfvenberg	8	DNQ	DNQ	DNQ	16	7	24	㉔	DNF1	NE	55
30	(Croatia) Zrinka Ljutić	DNQ	DNF1	DNQ	DNQ	DNF1	5	DNF1	㉕	DNS	45	50
	References											

=== Legend ===
- Winner (100 points)
- 2nd place (80 points)
- 3rd place (60 points)
- DNQ = Did not qualify for run 2
- DNF1 = Did not finish run 1
- DSQ1 = Disqualified run 1
- DNF2 = Did not finish run 2
- DSQ2 = Disqualified run 2
- DNS2 = Did not start run 2
- Did not start (DNS)
- Not eligible for finals (NE)
- Race canceled (x)
- FIS non-World Cup race (Winter Olympics)
- Updated at 19 March 2022, after all events.

== See also ==
- 2022 Alpine Skiing World Cup – Women's summary rankings
- 2022 Alpine Skiing World Cup – Women's overall
- 2022 Alpine Skiing World Cup – Women's downhill
- 2022 Alpine Skiing World Cup – Women's super-G
- 2022 Alpine Skiing World Cup – Women's giant slalom
- 2022 Alpine Skiing World Cup – Women's parallel
- World Cup scoring system
