= Alpine skiing at the 2022 Winter Olympics – Women's super-G =

Women's super-G at the XXIV Olympic Winter Games
- Alpine skiing
- Venue: Rock, Yanqing District
- Date: 11 February 2022
- Competitors: 44 from 24 nations
- Winning time: 1:13.51

Medalists
1st place, gold medalist(s)		Lara Gut-Behrami	Switzerland
2nd place, silver medalist(s)		Mirjam Puchner	Austria
3rd place, bronze medalist(s)		Michelle Gisin	Switzerland

Women's Super-G
- Location: "Rock" course Yanqing National Alpine Ski Centre
- Vertical: 540 m (1,772 ft)
- Top elevation: 1,825 m (5,988 ft)
- Base elevation: 1,285 m (4,216 ft)

The women's super-G competition of the Beijing 2022 Olympics was held on 11 February 2022 on the "Rock" course at Yanqing National Alpine Ski Centre ski resort in Yanqing District. Lara Gut-Behrami of Switzerland won her first gold medal, confirming her status as a defending world champion. Mirjam Puchner of Austria became the silver medalist, winning her first Olympic medal, and Michelle Gisin of Switzerland won bronze.

Ester Ledecká was the defending champion. The silver medalist, Anna Veith, and the bronze medalist, Tina Weirather, both retired from competitions. At the 2021–22 FIS Alpine Ski World Cup, five super-G events were held before the Olympics. Federica Brignone was leading the ranking, followed by Elena Curtoni and Sofia Goggia. Gut-Behrami was the 2021 world champion, with Corinne Suter and Mikaela Shiffrin being the silver and bronze medalists, respectively.

== Results ==
The race was started at 11:00 local time, (UTC+8). At the starting gate, the skies were clear, the temperature was −10.9 °C (12 °F), and the snow condition was hard packed.

Rank	Bib	Name	Country	Time	Behind
1st place, gold medalist(s)	7	Lara Gut-Behrami	Switzerland	1:13.51	
2nd place, silver medalist(s)	3	Mirjam Puchner	Austria	1:13.73	+0.22
3rd place, bronze medalist(s)	4	Michelle Gisin	Switzerland	1:13.81	+0.30
4	5	Tamara Tippler	Austria	1:13.84	+0.33
5	2	Ester Ledecká	Czech Republic	1:13.94	+0.43
6	17	Ragnhild Mowinckel	Norway	1:14.09	+0.58
7	9	Federica Brignone	Italy	1:14.17	+0.66
8	8	Cornelia Hütter	Austria	1:14.19	+0.68
9	11	Mikaela Shiffrin	United States	1:14.30	+0.79
10	13	Elena Curtoni	Italy	1:14.34	+0.83
11	12	Romane Miradoli	France	1:14.41	+0.90
12	20	Jasmine Flury	Switzerland	1:14.43	+0.92
13	15	Corinne Suter	Switzerland	1:14.49	+0.98
14	14	Marie-Michèle Gagnon	Canada	1:14.65	+1.14
15	26	Kira Weidle	Germany	1:14.66	+1.15
16	10	Laura Gauché	France	1:14.87	+1.36
17	19	Marta Bassino	Italy	1:15.08	+1.57
18	22	Julia Pleshkova	ROC	1:15.26	+1.75
19	6	Tessa Worley	France	1:15.30	+1.79
20	1	Ariane Rädler	Austria	1:15.33	+1.82
21	21	Isabella Wright	United States	1:15.37	+1.86
22	18	Francesca Marsaglia	Italy	1:15.61	+2.10
23	27	Maruša Ferk Saioni	Slovenia	1:15.72	+2.21
24	24	Roni Remme	Canada	1:15.78	+2.27
25	25	Elvedina Muzaferija	Bosnia and Herzegovina	1:15.79	+2.28
26	23	Maryna Gąsienica-Daniel	Poland	1:15.81	+2.30
27	30	Keely Cashman	United States	1:15.99	+2.48
28	29	Tiffany Gauthier	France	1:16.20	+2.69
29	38	Francesca Baruzzi	Argentina	1:16.65	+3.14
30	32	Cande Moreno	Andorra	1:16.72	+3.21
31	34	Greta Small	Australia	1:16.97	+3.46
32	39	Hólmfríður Dóra Friðgeirsdóttir	Iceland	1:17.41	+3.90
33	31	Tereza Nová	Czech Republic	1:17.88	+4.37
34	36	Noa Szőllős	Israel	1:17.94	+4.43
35	40	Sarah Schleper	Mexico	1:18.17	+4.66
36	33	Barbora Nováková	Czech Republic	1:18.26	+4.75
37	43	Anastasiya Shepilenko	Ukraine	1:19.60	+6.09
38	41	Petra Hromcová	Slovakia	1:20.11	+6.60
39	37	Rebeka Jančová	Slovakia	1:20.18	+6.67
40	35	Ni Yueming	China	1:22.59	+9.08
41	42	Kong Fanying	China	1:23.51	+10.00
42	44	Tess Arbez	Ireland	1:25.18	+11.67
	16	Alice Robinson	New Zealand	DNF	
	28	Alix Wilkinson	United States	DNF	
