= Alpine skiing at the 2022 Winter Olympics – Women's combined =

Women's combined at the XXIV Olympic Winter Games
- Alpine skiing
- Venue: Rock (DH) / Ice River (SL), Yanqing District
- Date: 17 February 2022
- Competitors: 26 from 14 nations
- Winning time: 2:25.67

Medalists
| 1st place, gold medalist(s) | | Michelle Gisin | Switzerland |
| 2nd place, silver medalist(s) | | Wendy Holdener | Switzerland |
| 3rd place, bronze medalist(s) | | Federica Brignone | Italy |

The Women's combined competition of the Beijing 2022 Olympics was held on 17 February, on "Rock" (DH) and "Ice River" (SL) courses at the Yanqing National Alpine Ski Centre in Yanqing District.

The defending champion was Michelle Gisin. The silver medalist, Mikaela Shiffrin, as well as the bronze medalist, Wendy Holdener, qualified as well. Gisin retained her title finishing ahead of Swiss compatriot Wendy Holdener with Italy’s Federica Brignone winning bronze. Shiffrin was the 2021 world champion, with Petra Vlhová and Gisin being the silver and bronze medalists, respectively. Shiffrin did not finish the slalom run.

== Schedule ==
| Date | Event | Winner |
|---|---|---|
| 16 February 2022 | Official training 1 (DH) | |
| 17 February 2022 | Competition | |

== Results ==
Results are as follows:

| Rank | Bib | Name | Nation | Downhill | Rank | Slalom | Rank | Total | Behind |
|---|---|---|---|---|---|---|---|---|---|
| 1st place, gold medalist(s) | 7 | Michelle Gisin | Switzerland | 1:33.42 | 12 | 52.25 | 1 | 2:25.67 | — |
| 2nd place, silver medalist(s) | 20 | Wendy Holdener | Switzerland | 1:33.41 | 11 | 53.31 | 3 | 2:26.72 | +1.05 |
| 3rd place, bronze medalist(s) | 16 | Federica Brignone | Italy | 1:33.11 | 8 | 54.41 | 4 | 2:27.52 | +1.85 |
| 4 | 5 | Ester Ledecká | Czech Republic | 1:32.43 | 2 | 55.89 | 5 | 2:28.32 | +2.65 |
| 5 | 3 | Katharina Huber | Austria | 1:35.68 | 19 | 53.12 | 2 | 2:28.80 | +3.13 |
| 6 | 10 | Christine Scheyer | Austria | 1:32.42 | 1 | 56.83 | 7 | 2:29.25 | +3.58 |
| 7 | 11 | Ramona Siebenhofer | Austria | 1:32.56 | 3 | 57.13 | 10 | 2:29.69 | +4.02 |
| 8 | 17 | Laura Gauché | France | 1:34.08 | 17 | 55.96 | 6 | 2:30.04 | +4.37 |
| 9 | 19 | Maruša Ferk Saioni | Slovenia | 1:33.07 | 6 | 57.05 | 8 | 2:30.12 | +4.45 |
| 10 | 22 | Julia Pleshkova | ROC | 1:33.54 | 14 | 57.16 | 11 | 2:30.70 | +5.03 |
| 11 | 25 | Tricia Mangan | United States | 1:35.89 | 20 | 57.05 | 8 | 2:32.94 | +7.27 |
| 12 | 23 | Cande Moreno | Andorra | 1:34.05 | 16 | 1:00.29 | 14 | 2:34.34 | +8.67 |
| 13 | 2 | Greta Small | Australia | 1:34.38 | 18 | 1:00.17 | 13 | 2:34.55 | +8.88 |
| 14 | 26 | Tereza Nová | Czech Republic | 1:37.07 | 23 | 58.39 | 12 | 2:35.46 | +9.79 |
| 15 | 24 | Kong Fanying | China | 1:41.95 | 24 | 1:05.73 | 15 | 2:47.68 | +22.01 |
| | 12 | Romane Miradoli | France | 1:32.95 | 4 | DNF | | —N/a | |
| | 9 | Mikaela Shiffrin | United States | 1:32.98 | 5 | DNF | | —N/a | |
| | 8 | Keely Cashman | United States | 1:33.09 | 7 | DNF | | —N/a | |
| | 6 | Nicol Delago | Italy | 1:33.12 | 9 | DNF | | —N/a | |
| | 18 | Priska Nufer | Switzerland | 1:33.15 | 10 | DNF | | —N/a | |
| | 15 | Marta Bassino | Italy | 1:33.45 | 13 | DNF | | —N/a | |
| | 1 | Isabella Wright | United States | 1:33.72 | 15 | DNF | | —N/a | |
| | 21 | Elvedina Muzaferija | Bosnia and Herzegovina | 1:35.89 | 20 | DNF | | —N/a | |
| | 4 | Nevena Ignjatović | Serbia | 1:37.02 | 22 | DSQ | | —N/a | |
| | 13 | Elena Curtoni | Italy | DNF | | —N/a | | | |
| | 14 | Roni Remme | Canada | DNF | | —N/a | | | |
