= Yanqing National Alpine Skiing Centre =

Ski resort in Yanqing, Beijing, China

Coordinates: 40°32′30″N 115°48′09″E

National Alpine Ski Centre
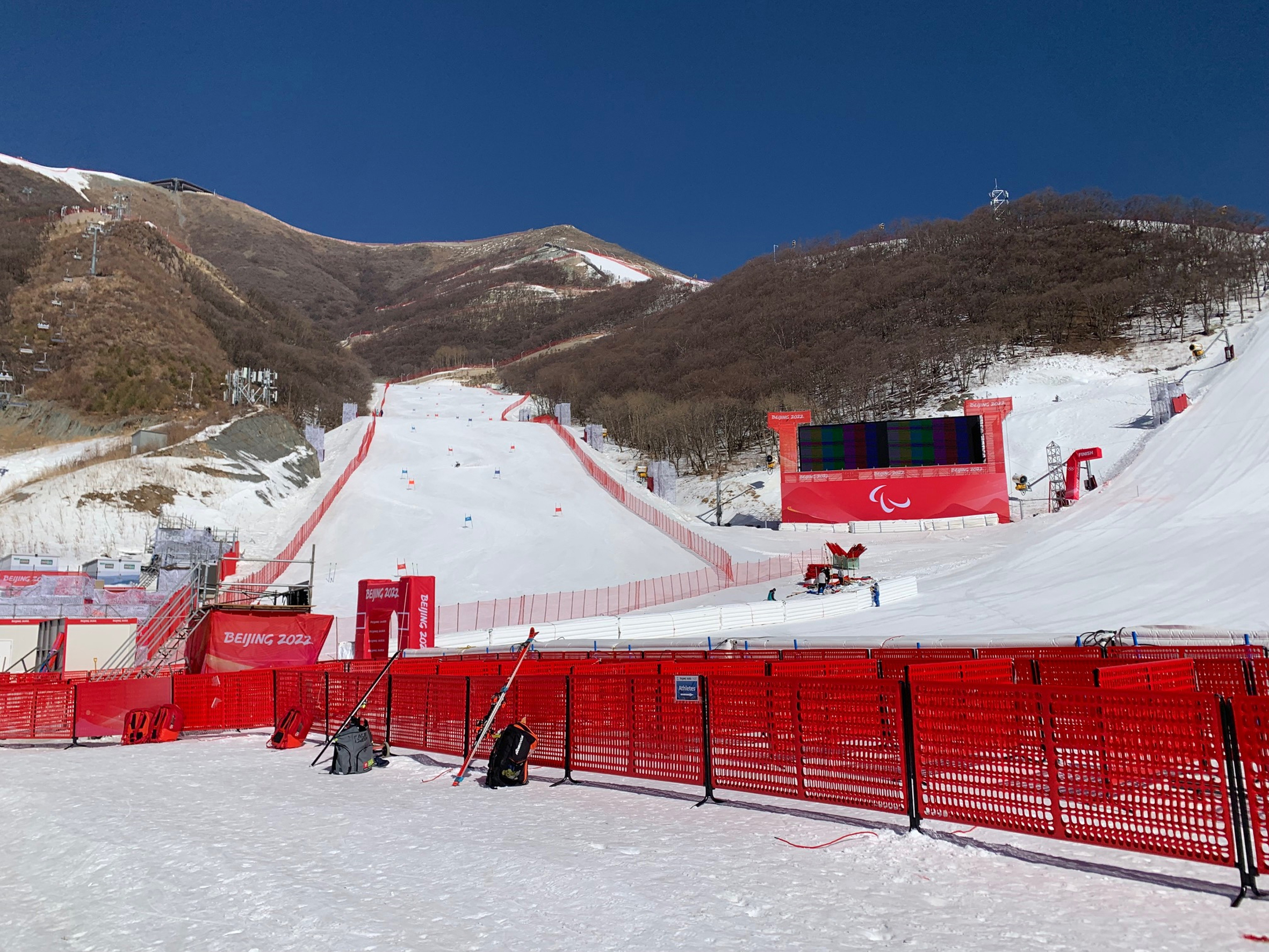
- Location: Yanqing District, Beijing, China
- Top elevation: 2,071 m (6,795 ft)
- Base elevation: 1,071 m (3,514 ft)
- Trails: 5 km (3.1 mi); 10 km (6.2 mi); 10 km (6.2 mi)
- Total length: 25 km (16 mi)
- Lift system: 5 gondolas, 4 chairlifts
- Lift capacity: 20,000 / h
- Snowmaking: 100%

National Alpine Skiing Centre
- Traditional Chinese: 國家高山滑雪中心
- Simplified Chinese: 国家高山滑雪中心
Transcriptions
Standard Mandarin
- Hanyu Pinyin: Guójiā Gāoshān Huáxuě Zhōngxīn

The Yanqing National Alpine Ski Centre is a Chinese alpine ski resort in Yanqing District, a suburban district in Beijing. It opened in 2019. It is 90 km (55 mi) northwest from the urban center of Beijing.

It is the venue for all, speed and technical, both men's and women's alpine skiing events for the 2022 Winter Olympics.

== History ==
The centre was constructed as part of the Yanqing cluster of 2022 Winter Olympics venues, alongside the Yanqing National Sliding Centre.

It opened in 2019. It planned to host a FIS Alpine Ski World Cup meet in February 2020, but it was cancelled due to the COVID-19 pandemic in China.

== Facilities ==
The resort is located in a forest at an elevation of 1,200 metres (3,900 ft), and is served by the Yanqing branch of the Beijing–Zhangjiakou intercity railway.

It has trails totaling 10 kilometres (6.2 mi), including seven racing courses with inclines up to 68%, among the steepest in the world.

Its vertical drop is approximately 900 metres (3,000 ft), the biggest of any ski area in the country. The region has little natural snowfall, so most of the resort's snow is generated artificially.

== Olympic courses ==
=== Men ===
Course	Discipline	Type
"Rock"	Downhill: - - - - - - - - - - - - - - - - - -; Super-G: - - - - - - - - - - - - - - - - - -; Alpine combined (DH)	Speed
"Ice River"	Alpine combined (SL): - - - - - - - - - - - - - - - - - -; Giant slalom: - - - - - - - - - - - - - - - - - -; Slalom	Speed

=== Women ===
Course	Discipline	Type
"Ice River"	Giant slalom: - - - - - - - - - - - - - - - -; Slalom	Technical
