= Alpine skiing at the 2022 Winter Olympics =

Alpine skiing at the XXIV Olympic Winter Games
- Alpine skiing pictogram
- Venue: "Rock" (speed events), "Ice River" (technical events), "Rainbow" (team event), Yanqing National Alpine Ski Centre, Yanqing District
- Dates: 7–20 February
- No. of events: 11 (5 men, 5 women, 1 mixed)

Locations in China

Alpine skiing at the 2022 Winter Olympics was held at the Yanqing National Alpine Ski Centre in Yanqing District, China. The competitions took place from 6 to 20 February 2022.

Speed events were held on "Rock" course and technical events on "Ice River" course for both men and women. The team event was held on "Rainbow."

A total of 306 quota spots (153 per gender) were distributed to the alpine skiing, a reduction of 14 from 2018. Eleven events were contested: five for men, five for women, and one mixed (team).

== Qualification ==
A maximum of 306 quota spots were available to athletes to compete at the games. A maximum of twenty-two athletes could be entered by a National Olympic Committee, with a maximum of eleven men or eleven women.

On January 24, 2022, the IOC granted four extra male quotas while the FIS began investigating the legitimacy of some low level qualifying events.

== Competition schedule ==
The competition schedule was altered from the original schedule due to weather conditions in Yanqing. All times were local (UTC+8).

Date	Time	Event	Course
7 February	12:00	Men's downhill	"Rock"
7 February	9:30; 14:30	Women's giant slalom	"Ice River"
8 February	11:00	Men's super-G	"Rock"
9 February	10:15; 13:45	Women's slalom	"Ice River"
10 February	10:30; 14:15	Men's combined	"Rock"/ "Ice River"
11 February	11:00	Women's super-G	"Rock"
13 February	10:15; 15:00	Men's giant slalom	"Ice River"
15 February	11:30	Women's downhill	"Rock"
16 February	10:15; 13:45	Men's slalom	"Ice River"
17 February	10:30; 14:00	Women's combined	"Rock"/ "Ice River"
20 February	9:00	Team event	"Rainbow"
Source: Times are (UTC+8)

Notes

- Men's downhill was postponed (high winds) from 6 to 7 February.
- Team event was postponed (strong winds) from 19 to 20 February.

=== Course information ===
Date	Race	Start elevation	Finish elevation	Vertical drop	Course length	Average gradient
7 February	Downhill – men	2,179 m (7,149 ft)	1,285 m (4,216 ft)	894 m (2,933 ft)	3.152 km (1.96 mi)	28.4%
15 February	Downhill – women	2,050 m (6,726 ft)	1,285 m (4,216 ft)	765 m (2,510 ft)	2.704 km (1.68 mi)	28.3%
10 February	Downhill – (AC) – men	2,179 m (7,149 ft)	1,285 m (4,216 ft)	894 m (2,933 ft)	3.152 km (1.96 mi)	28.4%
17 February	Downhill – (AC) – women	2,050 m (6,726 ft)	1,285 m (4,216 ft)	765 m (2,510 ft)	2.704 km (1.68 mi)	28.3%
8 February	Super-G – men	1,930 m (6,332 ft)	1,285 m (4,216 ft)	645 m (2,116 ft)	2.267 km (1.41 mi)	28.5%
11 February	Super-G – women	1,825 m (5,988 ft)	1,285 m (4,216 ft)	540 m (1,772 ft)	1.984 km (1.23 mi)	27.2%
13 February	Giant slalom – men	1,925 m (6,316 ft)	1,501 m (4,925 ft)	424 m (1,391 ft)		
7 February	Giant slalom – women	1,925 m (6,316 ft)	1,501 m (4,925 ft)	424 m (1,391 ft)		
16 February	Slalom – men	1,712 m (5,617 ft)	1,501 m (4,925 ft)	211 m (692 ft)		
9 February	Slalom – women	1,712 m (5,617 ft)	1,501 m (4,925 ft)	211 m (692 ft)		
10 February	Slalom – (AC) – men	1,712 m (5,617 ft)	1,501 m (4,925 ft)	211 m (692 ft)		
17 February	Slalom – (AC) – women	1,712 m (5,617 ft)	1,501 m (4,925 ft)	211 m (692 ft)		
20 February	Team event	1,603 m (5,259 ft)	1,487 m (4,879 ft)	116 m (381 ft)		

== Medal summary ==
Switzerland led all nations in the medal standings with five gold and nine medals overall.

=== Medal table ===
Rank	Nation	Gold	Silver	Bronze	Total
1	Switzerland	5	1	3	9
2	Austria	3	3	1	7
3	France	1	1	1	3
4	Slovakia	1	0	0	1
4	Sweden	1	0	0	1
6	Italy	0	2	2	4
7	Norway	0	1	3	4
8	Germany	0	1	0	1
8	Slovenia	0	1	0	1
8	United States	0	1	0	1
11	Canada	0	0	1	1
Totals (11 entries)		11	11	11	33

=== Medalists ===
==== Men's events ====
Event	Gold		Silver		Bronze	
Downhill	Beat Feuz; Switzerland	1:42.69	Johan Clarey; France	1:42.79	Matthias Mayer; Austria	1:42.85
Super-G	Matthias Mayer; Austria	1:19.94	Ryan Cochran-Siegle; United States	1:19.98	Aleksander Aamodt Kilde; Norway	1:20.36
Giant slalom	Marco Odermatt; Switzerland	2:09.35	Žan Kranjec; Slovenia	2:09.54	Mathieu Faivre; France	2:10.69
Slalom	Clément Noël; France	1:44.09	Johannes Strolz; Austria	1:44.70	Sebastian Foss-Solevåg; Norway	1:44.79
Combined	Johannes Strolz; Austria	2:31.43	Aleksander Aamodt Kilde; Norway	2:32.02	James Crawford; Canada	2:32.11

==== Women's events ====
Event	Gold		Silver		Bronze	
Downhill	Corinne Suter; Switzerland	1:31.87	Sofia Goggia; Italy	1:32.03	Nadia Delago; Italy	1:32.44
Super-G	Lara Gut-Behrami; Switzerland	1:13.51	Mirjam Puchner; Austria	1:13.73	Michelle Gisin; Switzerland	1:13.81
Giant slalom	Sara Hector; Sweden	1:55.69	Federica Brignone; Italy	1:55.97	Lara Gut-Behrami; Switzerland	1:56.41
Slalom	Petra Vlhová; Slovakia	1:44.98	Katharina Liensberger; Austria	1:45.06	Wendy Holdener; Switzerland	1:45.10
Combined	Michelle Gisin; Switzerland	2:25.67	Wendy Holdener; Switzerland	2:26.72	Federica Brignone; Italy	2:27.52

==== Mixed ====
Event	Gold	Silver	Bronze
Team	Austria; Katharina Huber; Katharina Liensberger; Katharina Truppe; Stefan Brennsteiner; Michael Matt; Johannes Strolz	Germany; Emma Aicher; Lena Dürr; Julian Rauchfuß; Alexander Schmid; Linus Straßer	Norway; Mina Fürst Holtmann; Thea Louise Stjernesund; Maria Therese Tviberg; Timon Haugan; Fabian Wilkens Solheim; Rasmus Windingstad

==== Participating nations ====
79 nations sent alpine skiers to compete in the events.

- Albania
- Andorra
- Argentina
- Armenia
- Australia
- Austria
- Belarus
- Belgium
- Bosnia and Herzegovina
- Bolivia
- Brazil
- Bulgaria
- Canada
- Chile
- China
- Chinese Taipei
- Colombia
- Croatia
- Cyprus
- Czech Republic
- Denmark
- Timor-Leste
- Eritrea
- Estonia
- Finland
- France
- Georgia
- Germany
- Great Britain
- Ghana
- Greece
- Haiti
- Hong Kong
- Hungary
- Iceland
- India
- Ireland
- Israel
- Italy
- Jamaica
- Japan
- Kazakhstan
- Kosovo
- Kyrgyzstan
- Latvia
- Lebanon
- Liechtenstein
- Lithuania
- Luxembourg
- Madagascar
- Malaysia
- Mexico
- Montenegro
- Monaco
- Morocco
- Netherlands
- New Zealand
- Norway
- Pakistan
- Peru
- Philippines
- Poland
- Portugal
- Puerto Rico
- ROC
- Romania
- San Marino
- Saudi Arabia
- Serbia
- Slovakia
- Slovenia
- South Korea
- Spain
- Sweden
- Switzerland
- Thailand
- Turkey
- Ukraine
- United States
- Uzbekistan
