= Åresjön =

Lake in Åre Municipality, Sweden

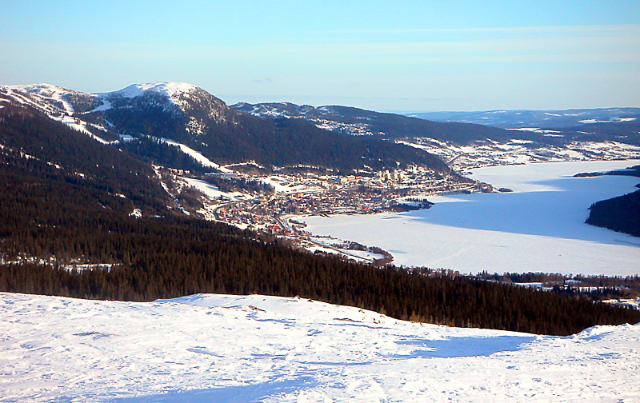
- Åresjön in winter

- Location within Sweden
- Location: Jämtland County
- Coordinates: 63°23′34″N 13°4′34″E
- Primary inflows: Indalsälven
- Primary outflows: Indalsälven
- Basin countries: Sweden
- Surface area: 6.4189 km^{2} (2.4784 sq mi) (1996)
- Average depth: 9.8 metres (32 ft) (1952)
- Max. depth: 19.2 metres (63 ft) (1952)
- Water volume: 61.275 km^{3} (14.701 mi^{3}) (1952)
- Surface elevation: 372.4 metres (1,222 ft) (1996)
- Frozen: December–May
- Settlements: Åre

Åresjön is a lake situated at 372.4 metres (1,222 ft) above mean sea level in Åredalen, Jämtland County, Sweden, with primary inflow and outflow being Indalsälven. The lake is 6.4189 km^{2} (2.4784 sq mi) large, it has 9.8 metres (32 ft) of average depth and reaches 19.2 metres (63 ft) at the deepest point. The European route E14 and Mittbanan railway runs along the northern coastline through Åre and some minor settlements. Åre Ski Area lies on the northern bank of the lake; Åreskutan and Renfjället peaks are on each side of the valley. The lake is frozen from late November to early May, which makes it perfect for ice skating.
