= SkiStar =

Travel and holiday companies of Sweden

Skistar
- Formerly: Sälenstjärnan (1975—2001)
- Founded: 1975; 50 years ago

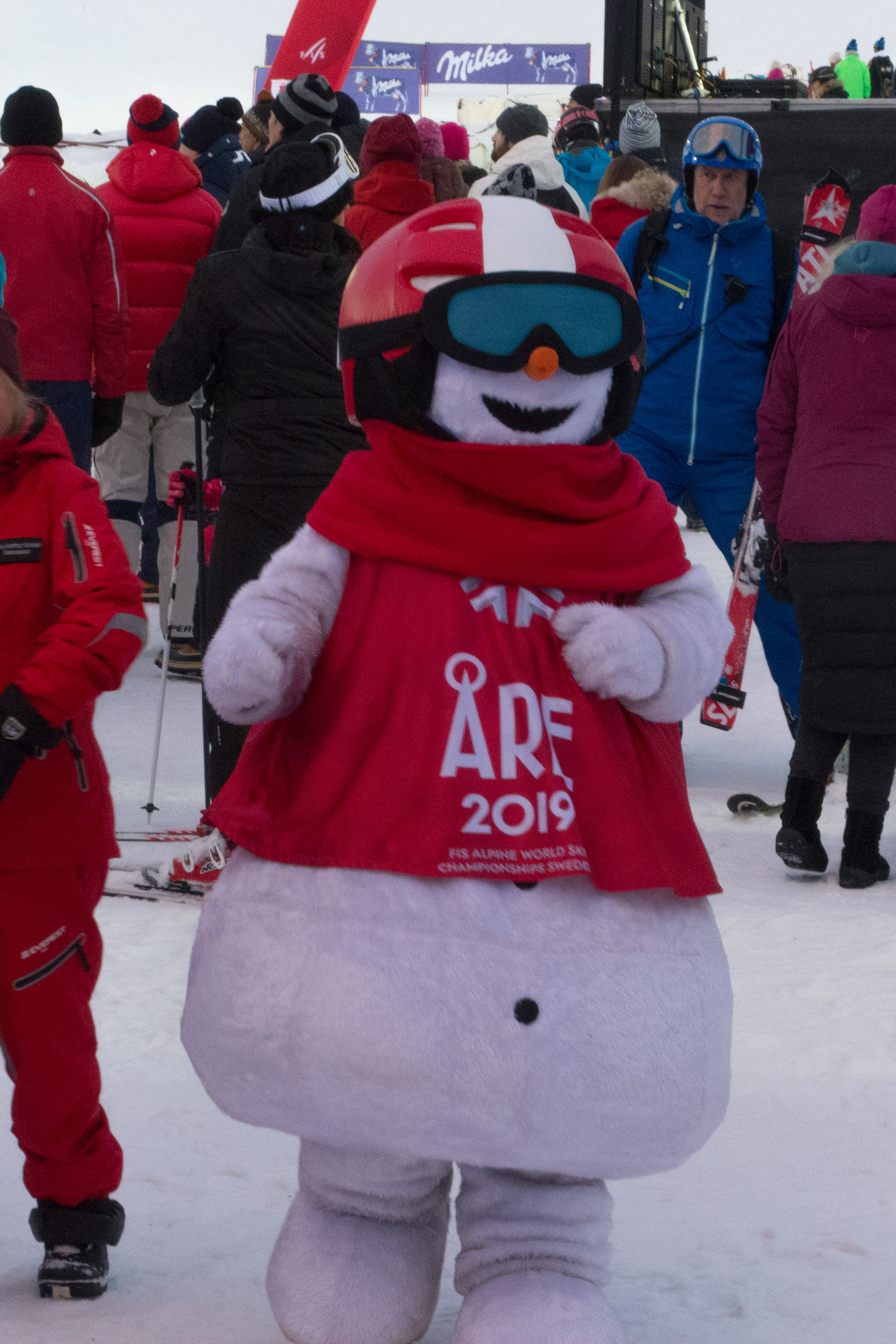
Valle the Snowman is the company's mascot.

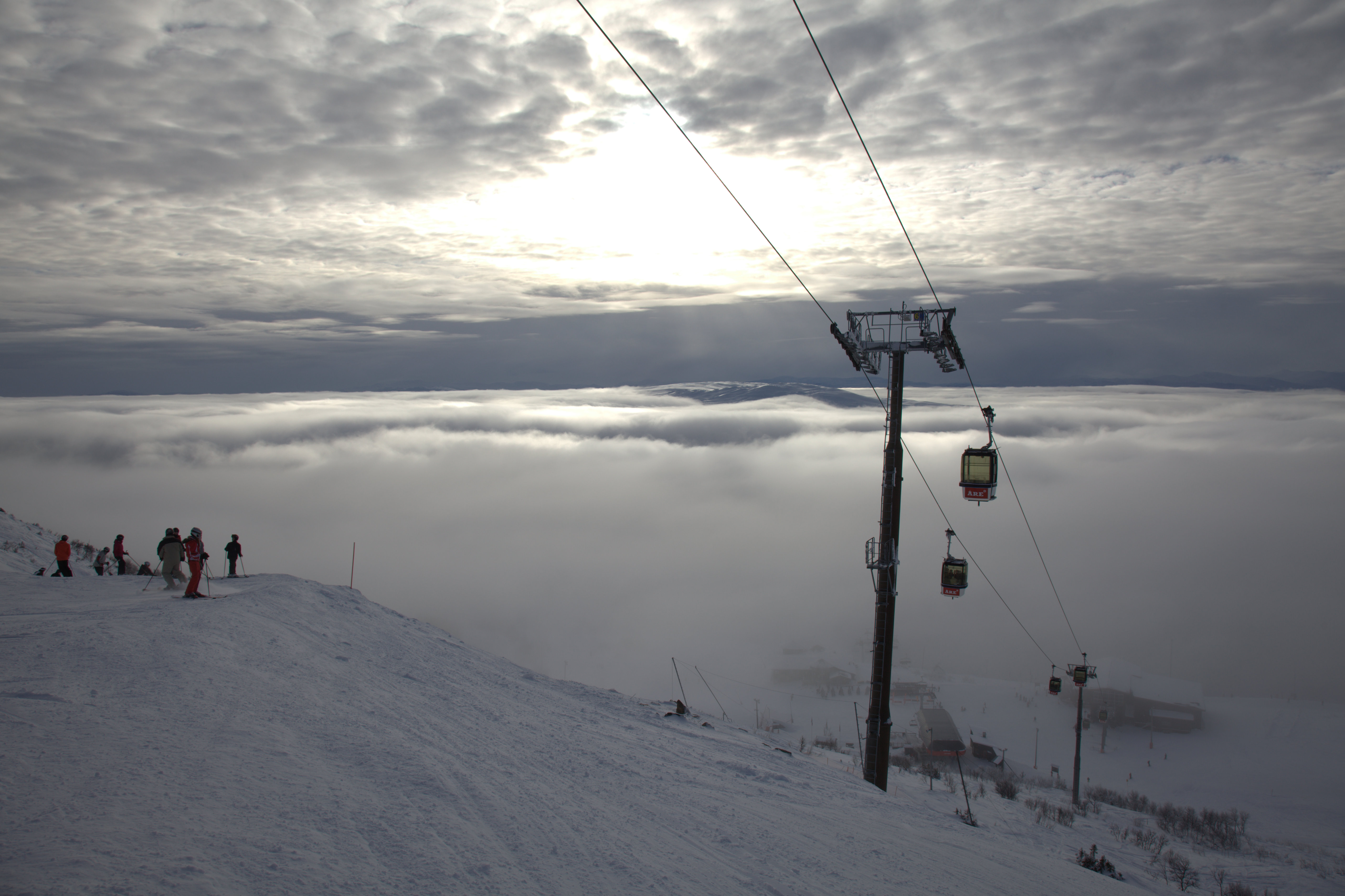
Gondolen, a skilift on Åreskutan, Åre, Sweden.

SkiStar AB (marketed as skistar) is a Swedish leisure, tourism, property and retail company, listed on the Stockholm Stock Exchange. The core business is alpine skiing in Sweden and Norway, and the associated accommodation, ski schools and rental services.

== Overview ==
The company has property development and management divisions, for example it is part-owner of Scandinavian Mountains Airport in Dalarna. The company also supplies ski infrastructure to other operators, for example it installed the ski lifts at Nätschen, Switzerland.

Skistar operates SkiStarshop Concept Store, a chain of retail outlets selling mainly winter sport-related clothing and equipment, and an associated online shop skistarshop.com.

From its foundation in 1975 until 2001 the company was called Sälenstjärnan AB.

=== List of ski resorts ===
- Sälen, Dalarna, Sweden (head office)
  - Lindvallen, Högfjället, Tandådalen and Hundfjället
- Vemdalen, Jämtland, Sweden
  - Björnrike, Vemdalsskalet and Klövsjö/Storhogna
- Åre, Jämtland, Sweden
  - Duved, Åre By and Björnen
- Trysil, Innlandet, Norway
  - Høgegga, Skihytta, Trysil Turistsenter and Trysil Høyfjellssenter
- Hemsedal, Buskerud, Norway
- Hammarbybacken, Stockholm, Sweden

== Subsidiaries ==
SkiStar has several subsidiary companies, including:

- Fjällinvest AB, wholly owned Swedish property development company
- Fjellinvest Norge AS, wholly owned Norwegian property development company
- Sälens Högfjällshotell AB
- Tandådalens Fjällhotell Service AB
- Åre Invest AB
