= Åre Old Church =

Church in Jämtland County, Sweden

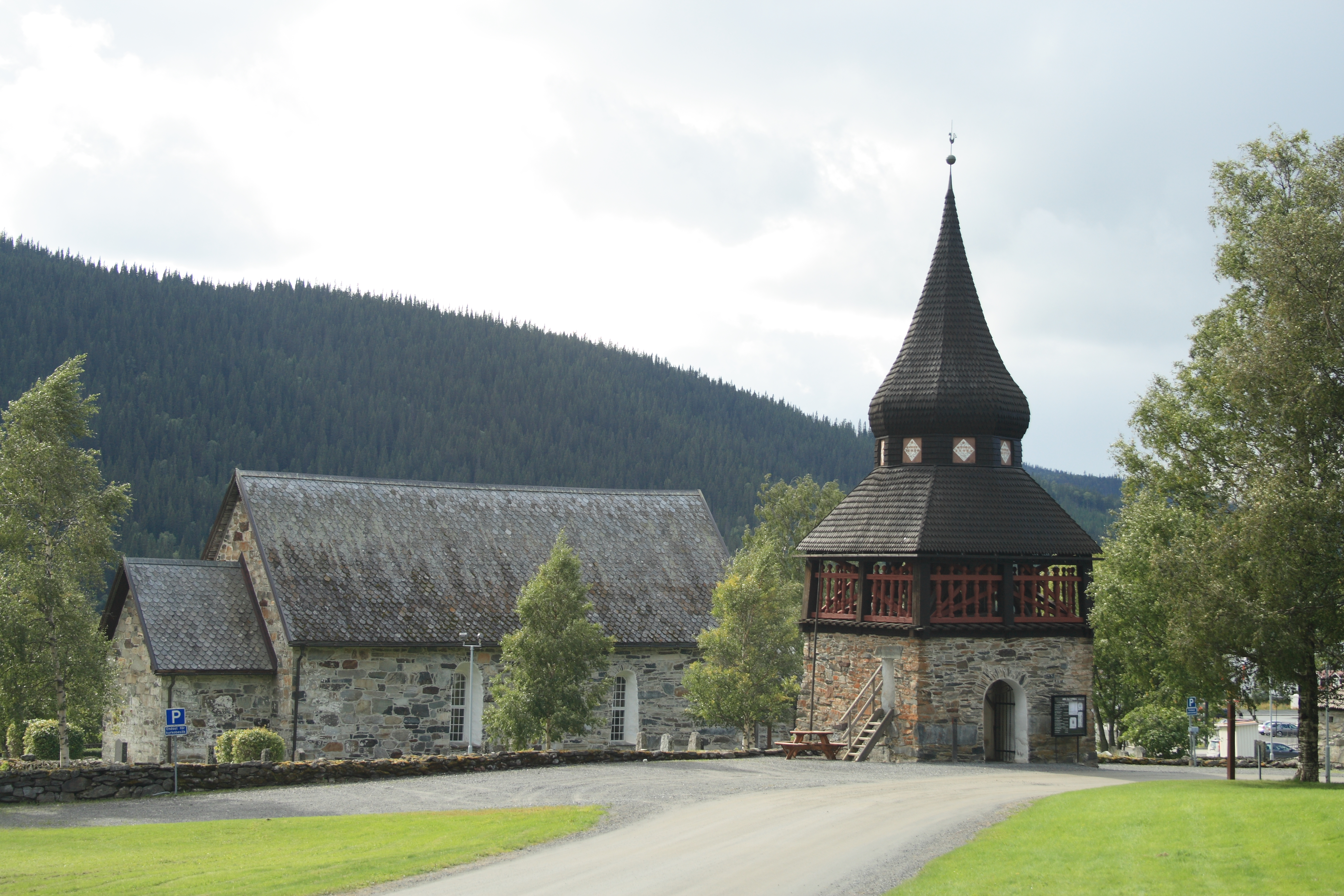
- Åre Old Church
- Åre Old Church
- 63°23′50.42″N 13°4′51.33″E
- Location: Åre
- Country: Sweden
- Denomination: Church of Sweden
- Website: www.svenskakyrkan.se/are

History
- Founded: 12th century

Administration
- Diocese: Härnösand

Åre Old Church (Swedish: Åre gamla kyrka) is a Romanesque church building situated in Åre, a parish within the Diocese of Härnösand and a locality in Åre Municipality, Jämtland County, Sweden. The church was erected in the late 12th century at the Saint Olaf Pilgrim's Route (Swedish: S:t Olofleden), which nowadays goes from Selånger Old Church ruins at Sundsvall over the Scandinavian Mountains to Trondheim, Norway.

== Medieval church building ==
Åre Old Church was built in the late 12th century entirely in stone, with inspiration from contemporary Norwegian church buildings, since Jämtland then was a part of Norway. It is situated at the Saint Olaf Pilgrim's Route (Swedish: S:t Olofleden), and nowadays is the seventeenth stop on the route that goes from Selånger Old Church ruins at Sundsvall, situated at the Gulf of Bothnia, and crosses the Scandinavian Mountains via Stiklestad to the Nidaros Cathedral in Trondheim, Norway — and remains the only stone church in the Scandinavian Mountains from the Middle Ages. Other remaining medieval churches in the Scandinavian Mountains are stave churches situated in Norway.

The original church's interior dimensions were only a mere 5 metres (16 ft) by 11 metres (36 ft), with a choir of 2.5 metres (8 ft 2 in) by 2.5 metres. There were only three tiny windows, so it was quite a dark church. Preserved medieval artifacts in the church are two ship candlesticks, a processional cross and an unusual wooden statue of Saint Olaf. The statue does not show him as usual with an orb in his left hand and a war axe in his right wearing a crown, but only with an orb in his left hand wearing a tricorne uniform hat of the Caroleans. The wooden statue itself was dated as being from the 14th century, but it can be older.

== Expansion of the church ==
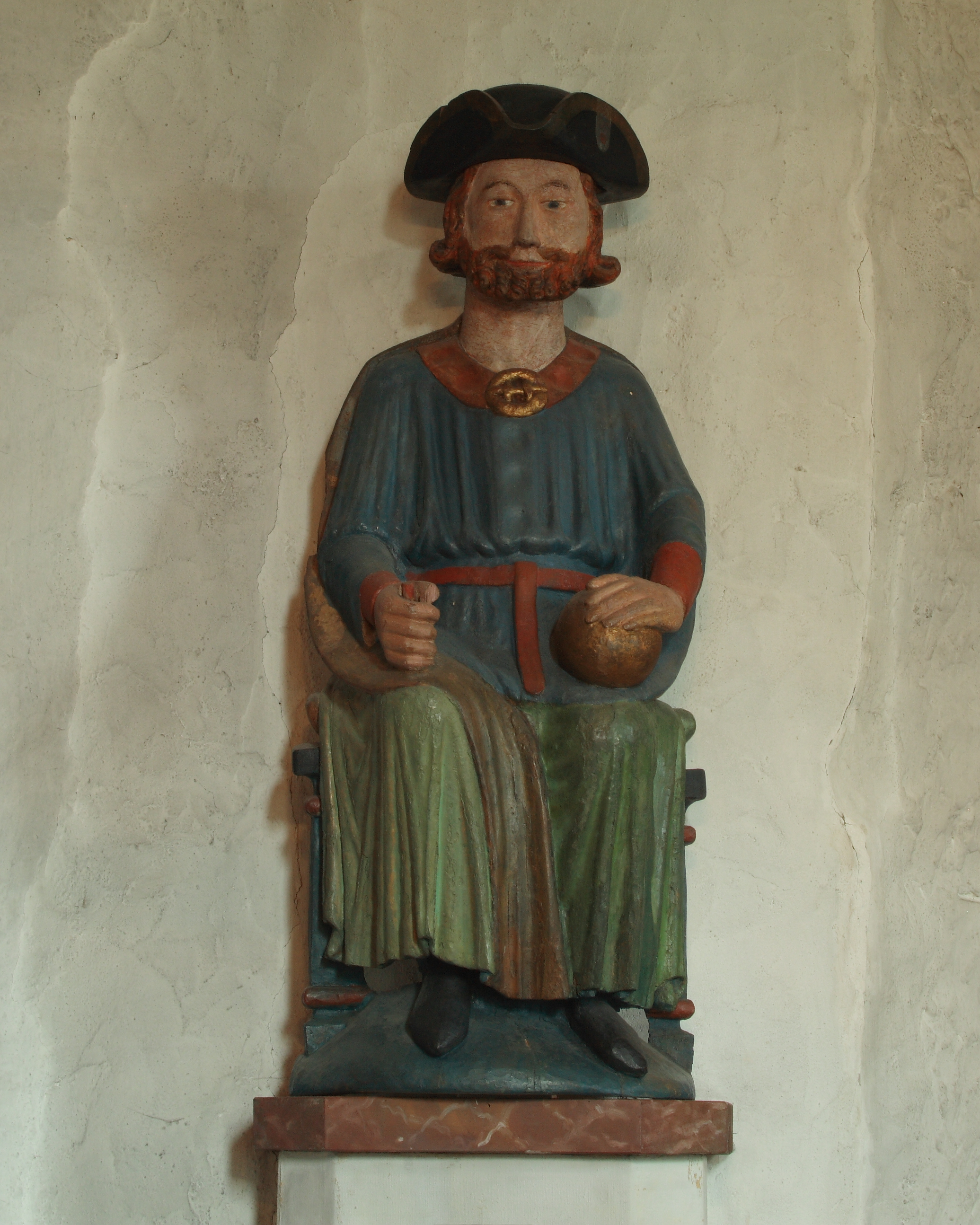
Statue of Saint Olaf wearing a tricorne uniform hat.

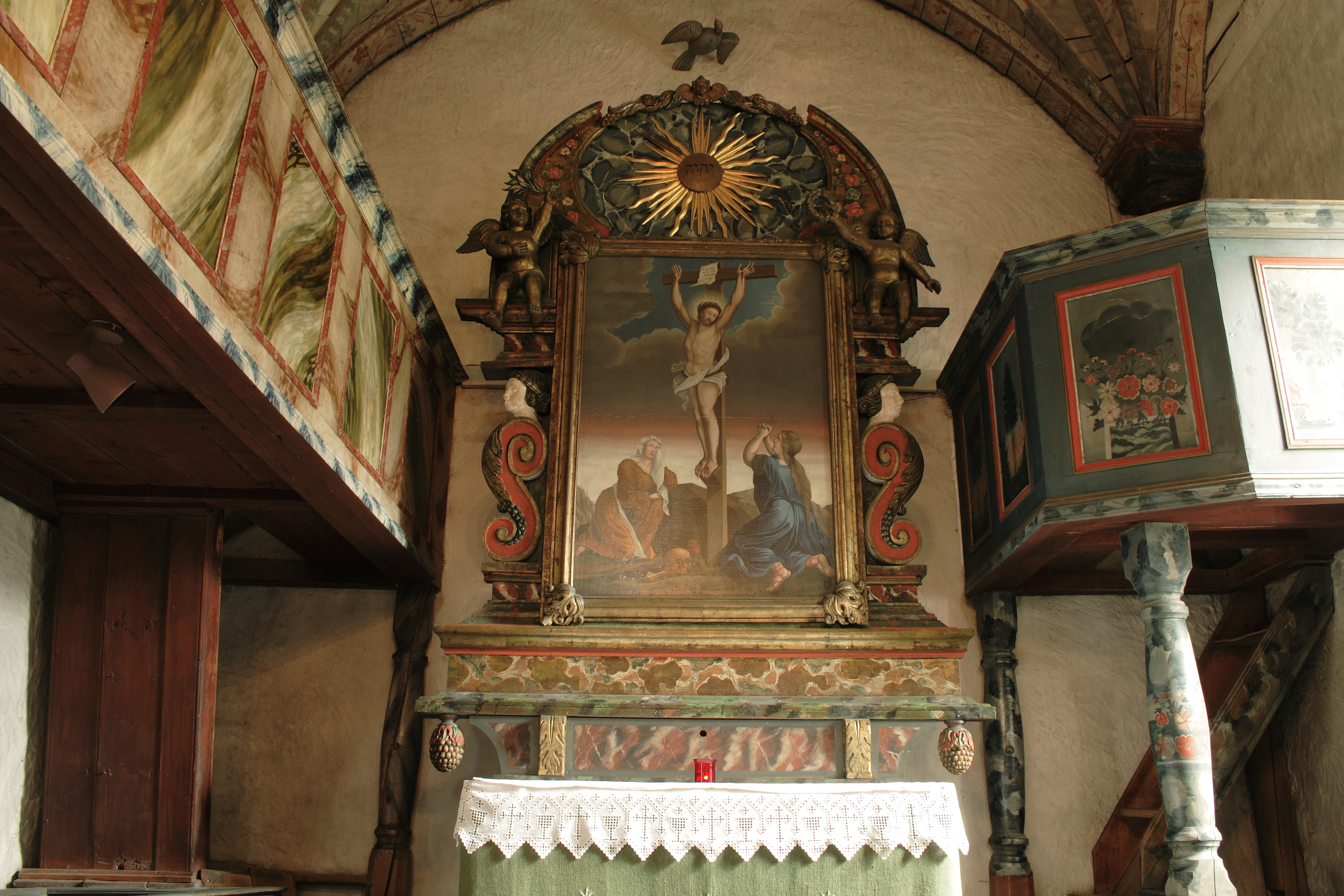
Åre Old Church altar.

After centuries of warfare between Denmark–Norway and Sweden, the Second Treaty of Brömsebro made Jämtland a part of Sweden. In 1673 the church had a pulpit installed at the southern church wall according to Norwegian traditions. The baptismal font and gallery at the northern church wall also dates from the end of the 17th century. In 1736 the church was extended almost 12 metres (39 ft) to the west. The old choir was converted into a sacristy, and the new entrance of the church was placed to the west with a porch in stone.

A mighty reredos was added over the new altar depicting the mourning Marys and the crucifixion of Christ in the centre. Higher windows were added as well as the current pews. The characteristical bell tower was erected during the 1750s by Erik Olofsson i Rännberg. It belongs to a group of typical belltowers of the 18th century Jämtland with its onion-shaped cupola.

== Gallery ==
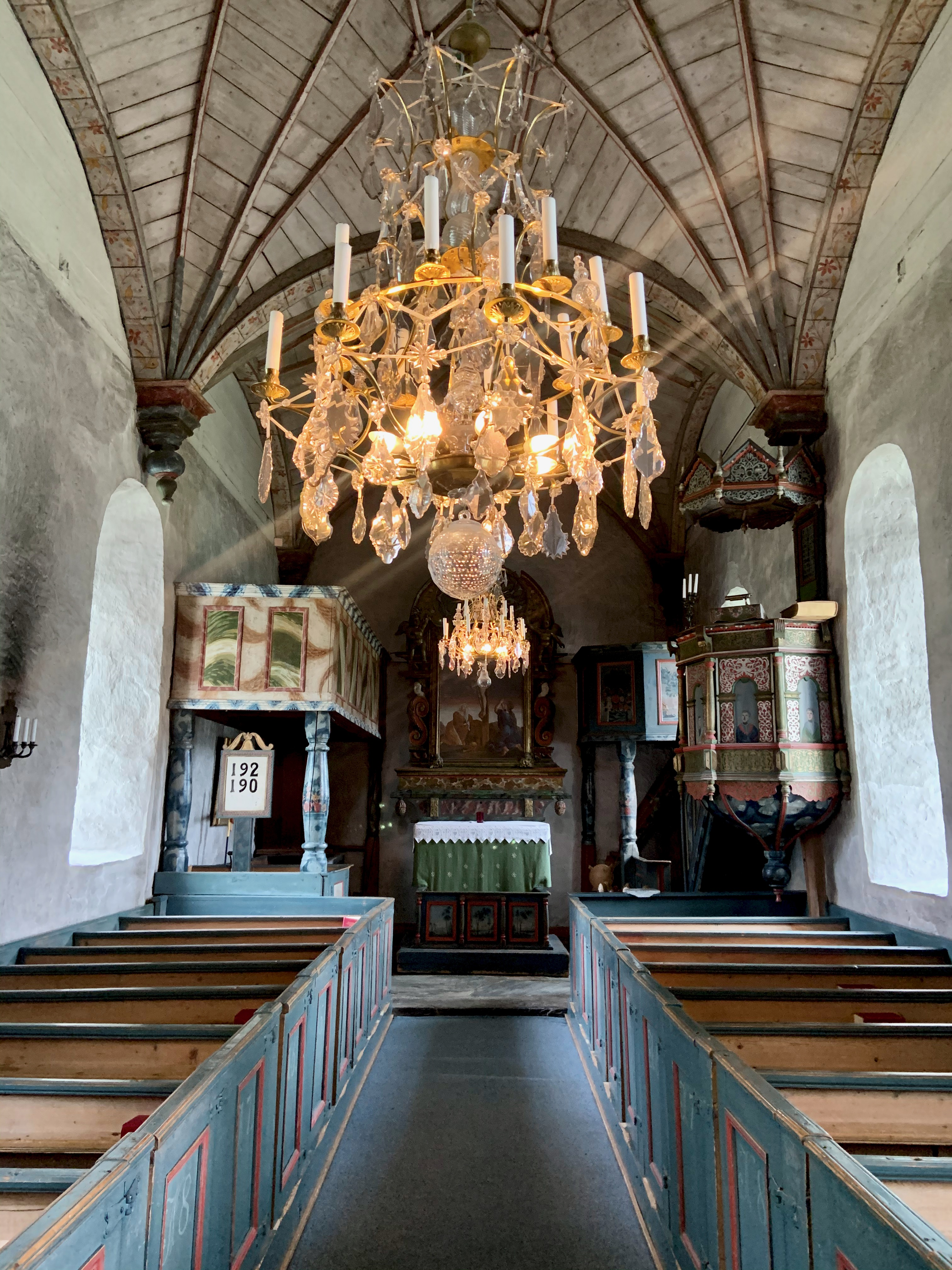
The church's interior

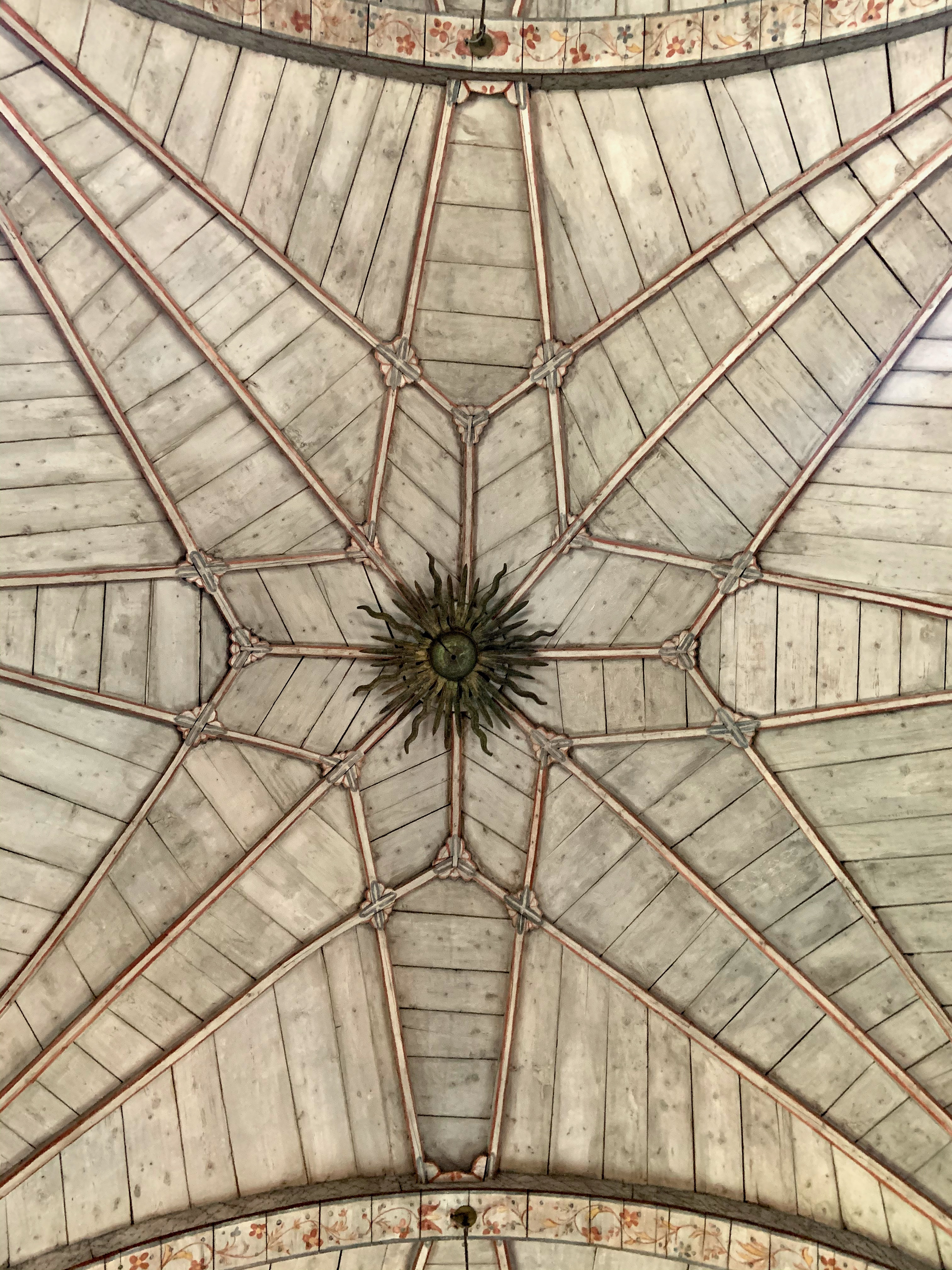
The wooden ceiling

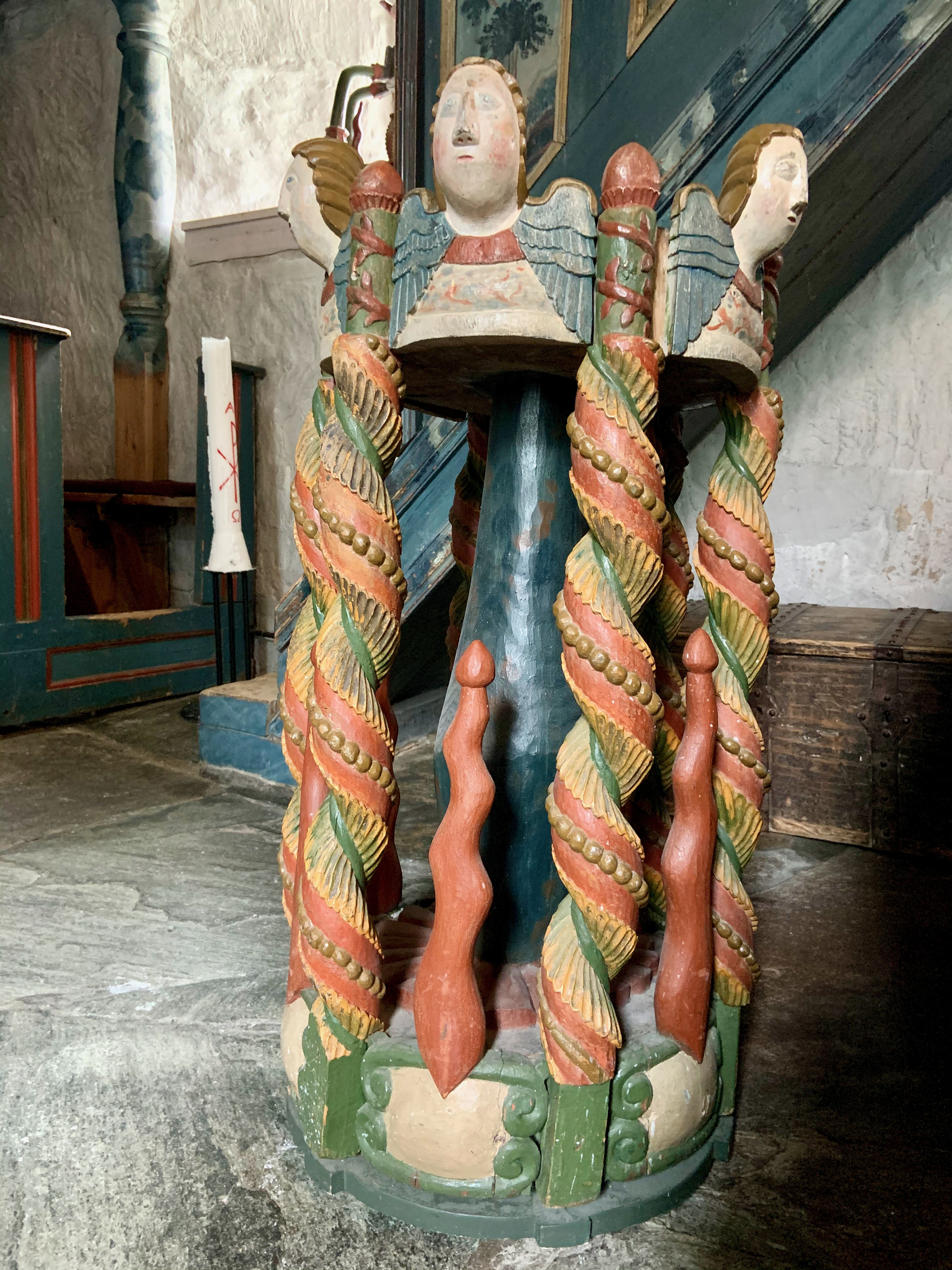
The richly decorated wooden baptismal font

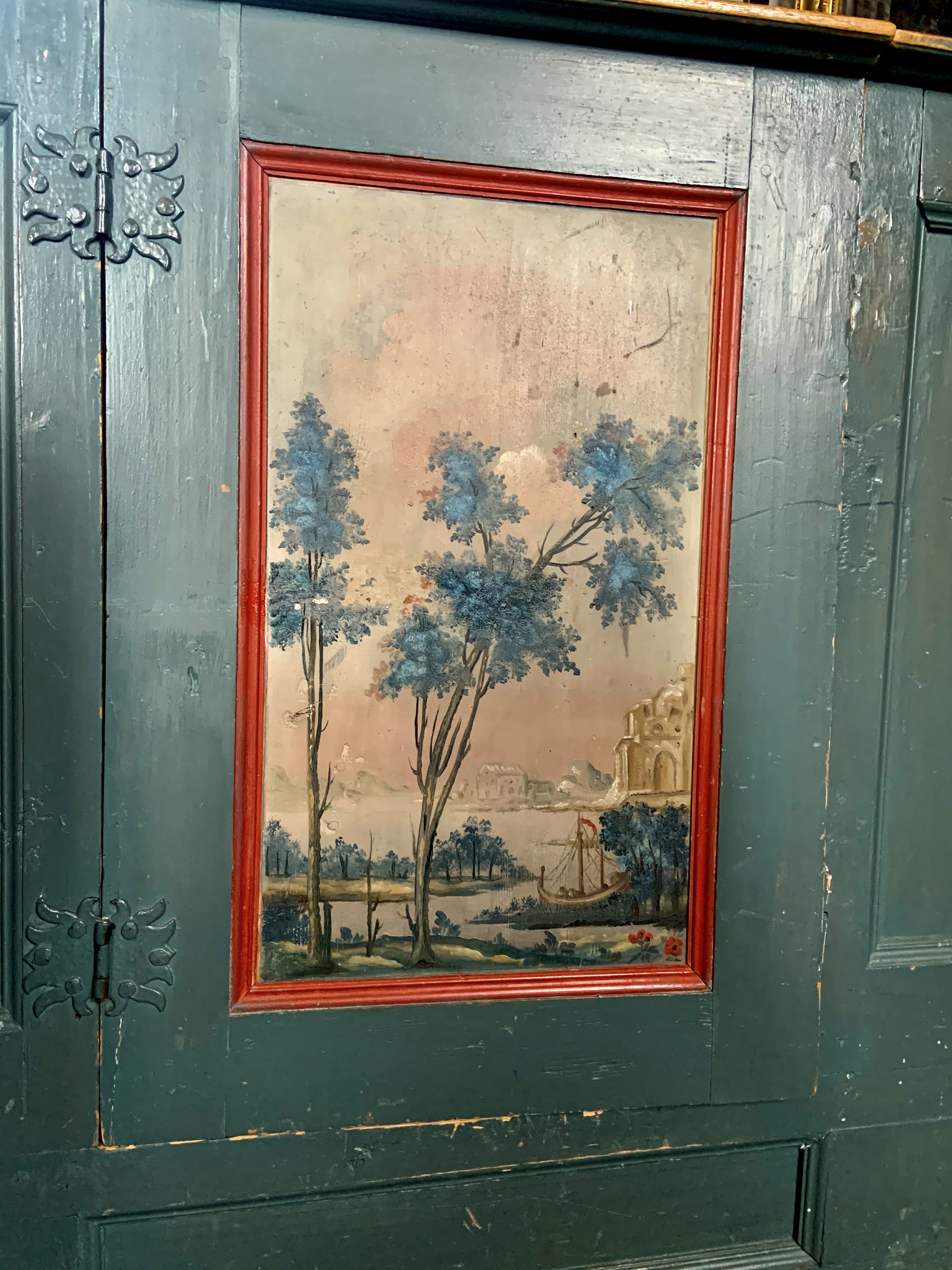
Painted wooden front

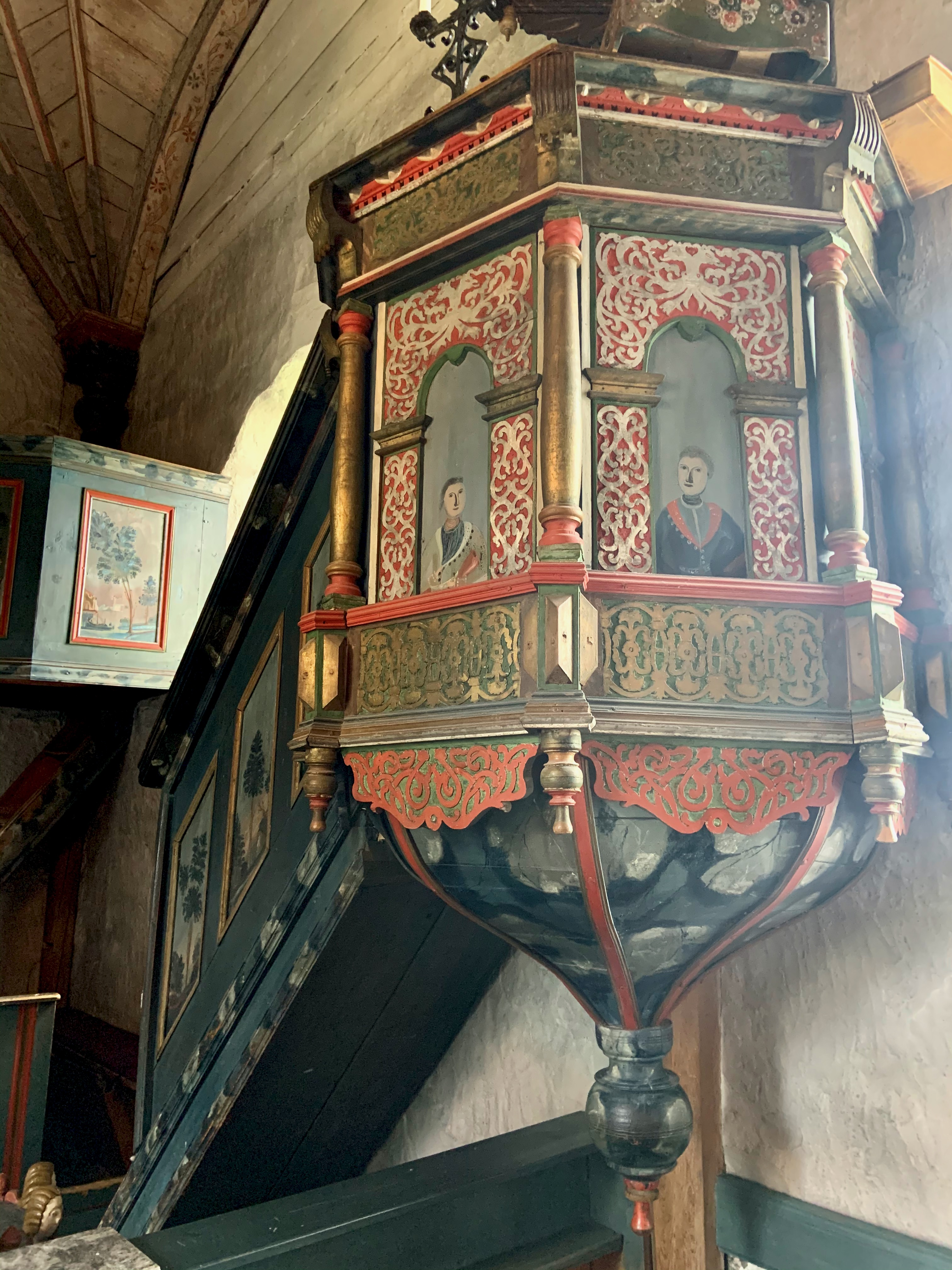
The wooden pulpit

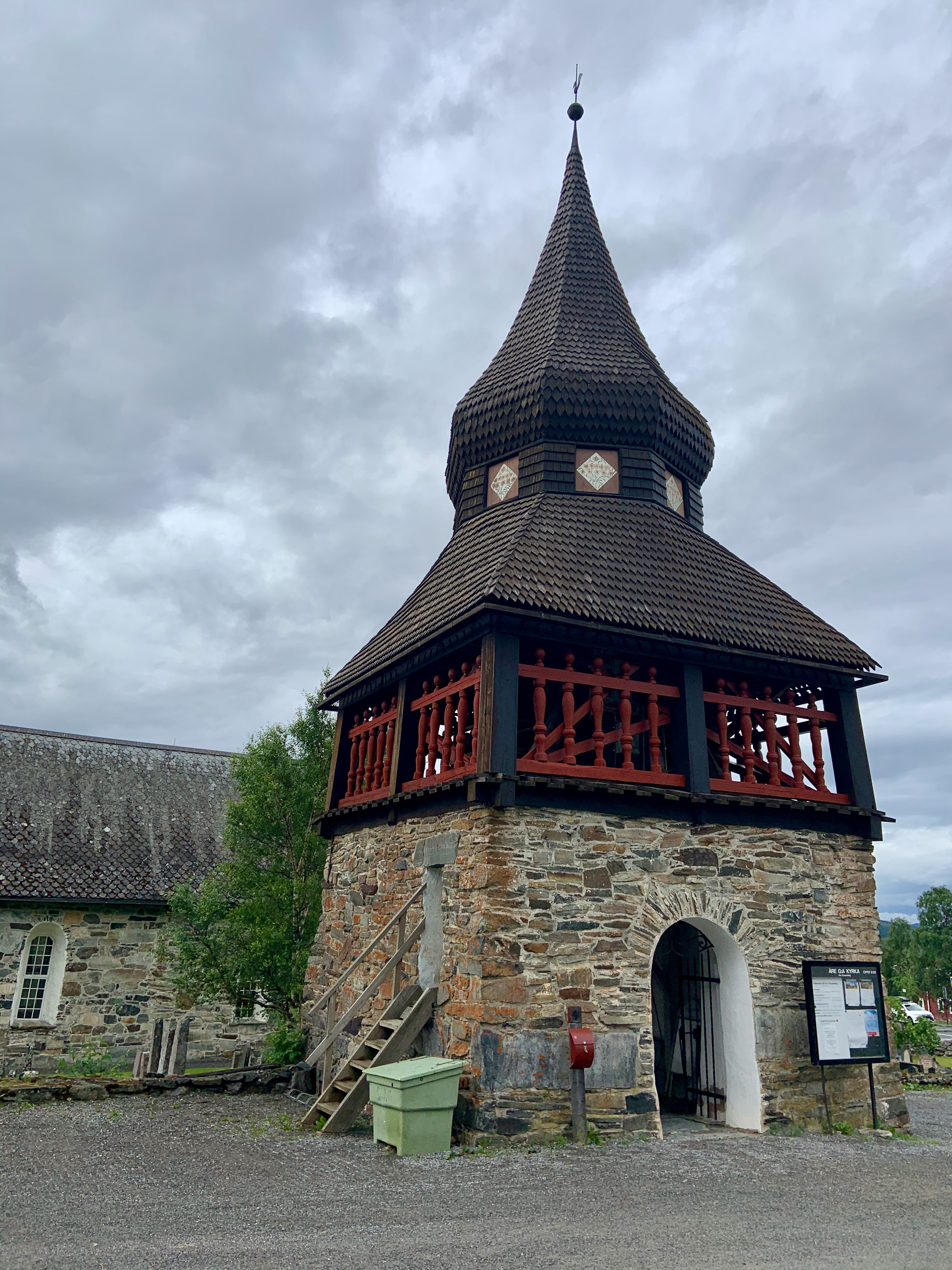
The belfry

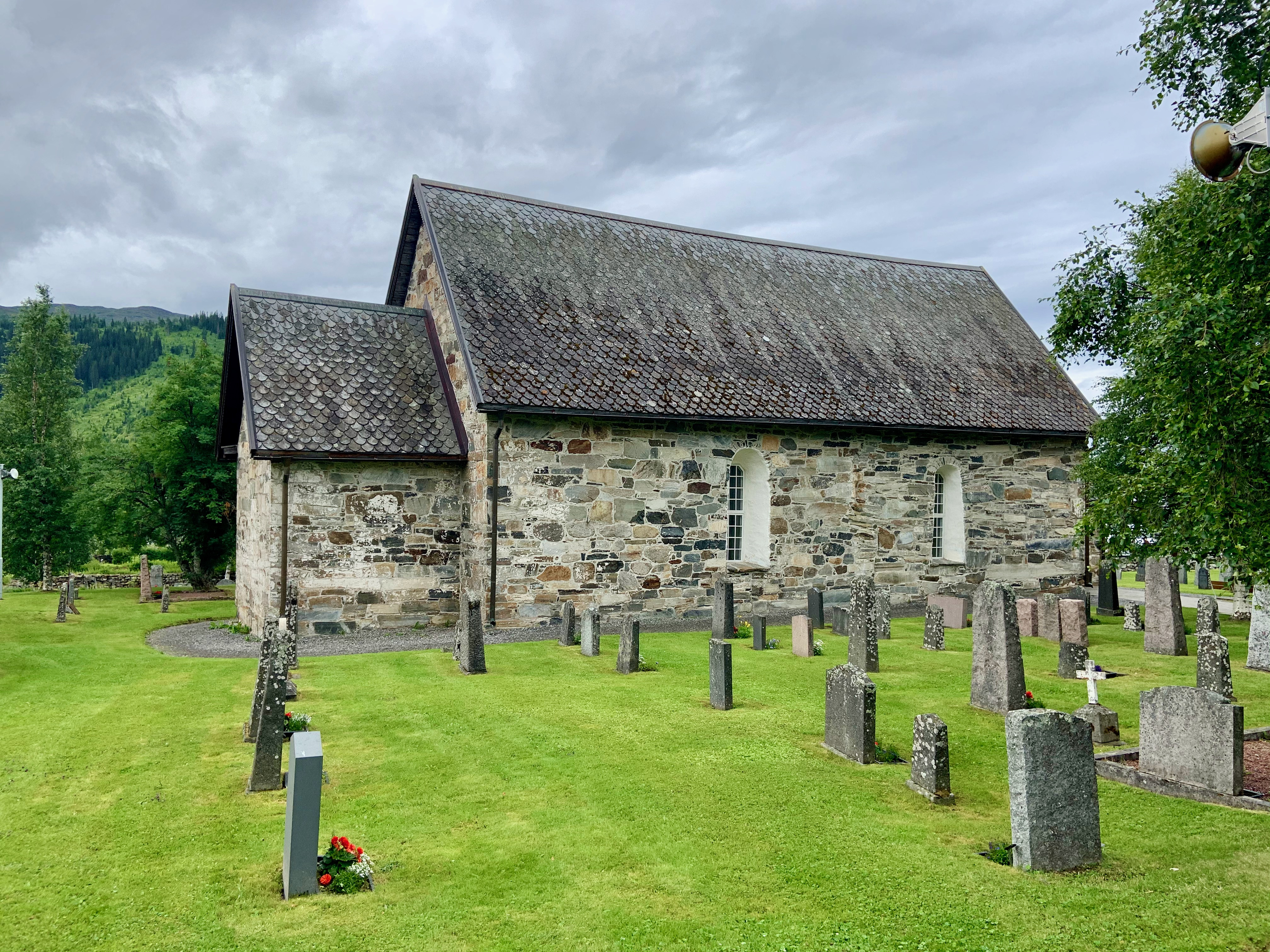
Part of the cemetery

== Church life today ==
Åre Old Church has room for 150 seated people and is open all year, every day for twelve hours from 8 a.m., and in 2008 in average three services were held a week.
