= Åre ski resort =

Ski resort in Jämtland, Sweden

Åreskutan

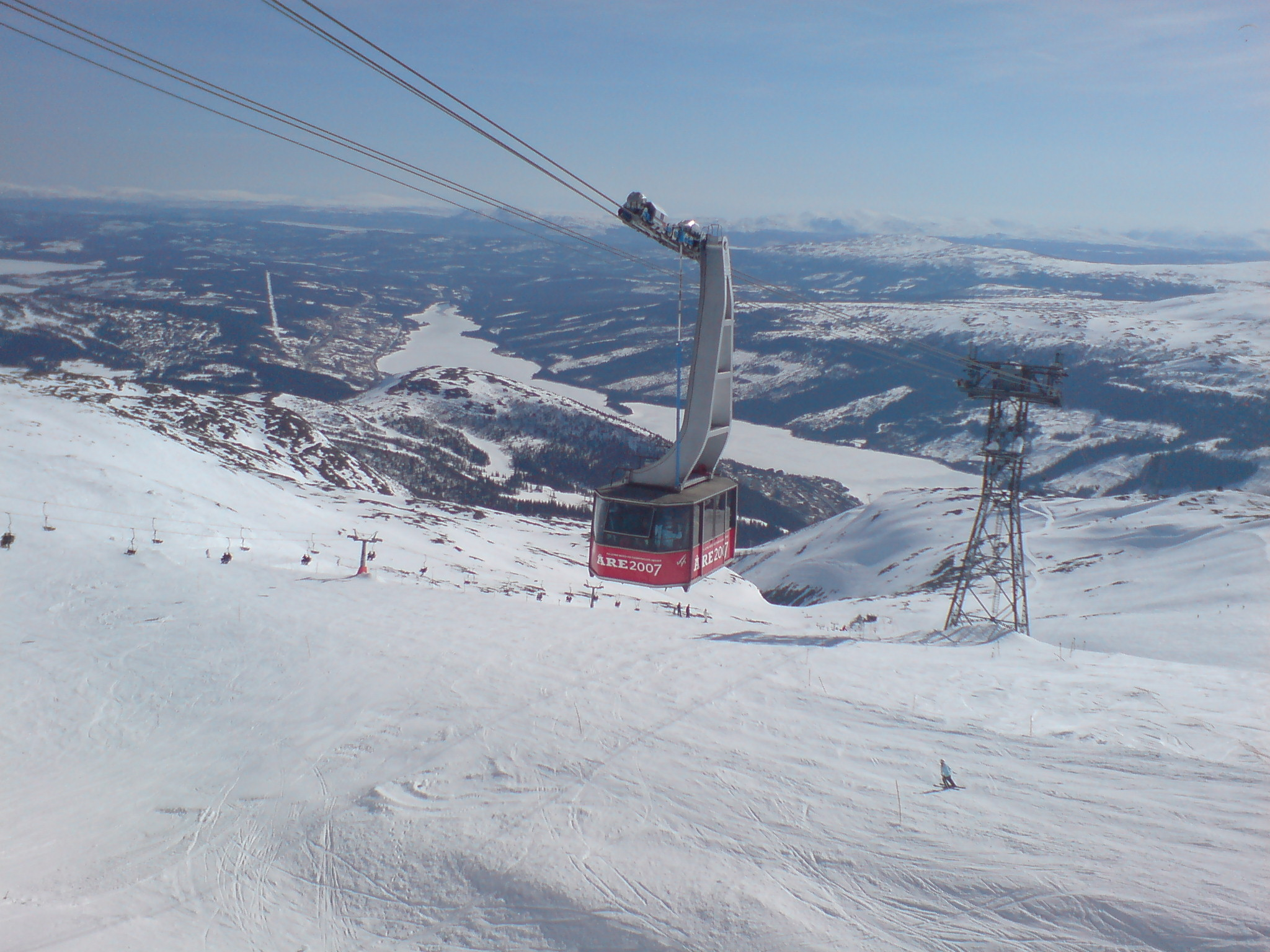
- Cable Car in April 2007

- Location in Sweden
- Location: Åre, Jämtland, Sweden
- Nearest city: Östersund
- Coordinates: 63.415°N 13.062°E
- Vertical: 1,030 m (3,380 ft); 870 m (2,850 ft) - (lift)
- Top elevation: 1,420 m (4,660 ft); 1,260 m (4,130 ft) - (lift)
- Base elevation: 390 m (1,280 ft)
- Skiable area: 4.37 km^{2} (1,080 acres)
- Trails: 112 total – 20 beginner – 38 intermediate – 38 advanced – 5 expert 11 unprepared / unsupervised
- Longest run: 6.5 km (4.0 mi)
- Total length: 101 km (63 mi)
- Lift system: 46 total 30 surface lift 8 chair 1 Gondola; 1 Funicular; 1 Cable Car; 5 Magic carpet
- Terrain parks: 3 terrain parks
- Snowmaking: yes
- Night skiing: 6–8 pm
- Website: skistar.com/are

Åre (Swedish pronunciation: [ˈôːrɛ]) is a ski resort in Jämtland, Sweden, founded 117 years ago in 1909 and owned by SkiStar AB.

The town of Åre is located in Åre Municipality, in what is generally referred to as Årefjällen (Åre Mountains) or Åredalen (Åre Valley), approximately 100 km (62 mi.) from the city of Östersund. The ski lift system is on the Åreskutan mountain, with a summit elevation of 1,420 m (4,660 ft), which is not lift-served, but is reachable by a short hike or by snowmobile. The lift-served vertical drop is 870 m (2,850 ft), descending from 1,260 m (4,130 ft).

The village and ski area are accessible by bus and train, and the nearest airport is Åre Östersund Airport. With a latitude of 63.4° north, the ski area is approximately 350 km (220 mi) south of the Arctic Circle.

== History ==
- 1882 – The railway to Åre is finished and officially opened by King Oscar II.
- 1891 – Åre tourist information centre opens. "Tourists and spa guests visiting the climatic spa Åre" is the theme of the first advertising campaign.
- 1892 – The café on the top of Åreskutan opens; it remains the highest café in Sweden.
- 1910 – Åre Bergbana opens, the first fixed link in Åre, beginning the area's development as a winter sports resort. Tobogganing, curling and skiing are offered.
- 1935 – The local slalom racing club, the Åre Slalomklubb, is formed. Over the years, the club's members have included such names as Lars-Börje Eriksson (Olympic bronze medalist in super G, 1988), Patrik Järbyn (World Championships silver medalist in Super G, 1996,) Richard Richardsson (Olympic silver medalist in snowboard parallel giant slalom, 2002), and freestyle skier Henrik Harlaut (multiple X-Games winner, World Championships silver medalist, 2019 and Olympic bronze medalist, 2022).
- 1940 – The first drag lift is opened in Åre, located near the Olympia area and Lundsgården. The tiny yellow lift cabin is still in place.
- 1952 – The Fjällgården ski area is opened. The lift passengers were transported standing up in tall buckets, one of which is displayed in front of the funicular station on Åre square.
- 1954 – Åre hosts the World Championships, making Åre known throughout the skiing world.
- 1966 – Duveds Linbana, the first chairlift in Duved, is opened, followed by other investments in the Duved ski area.
- 1981 – The first lift is built at Åre Björnen, followed by other investments in the area. The first snow cannons are installed at Åre.
- 1984 – The Olympia lift is opened 1 km west of Åre. It gets replaced in 2006 by the VM8 telemix lift.
- 1989 – The Olympia gondola is opened by King Carl XVI Gustav and Queen Silvia. It goes from upper end of the Olympia lift (later VM8) to the top of the ski area.
- 2001 – In the central part of the Åre ski area, two new lifts are built, and three new slopes are opened — the single largest investment since the building of the cable car.
- 2006 – The Olympia chairlift is replaced by the world's first telemix lift, a lift with chairs and gondolas.
- 2007 – Åre hosts the World Championships for a second time.
- 2009 – Åre is named winner of "World's top ski resorts" by the British travel magazine Condé Nast Traveller.
- 2013 – Sadelexpressen, Fjällgårdsexpressen and Tegeliften opened.
- 2016 – Åre hosts Freestyle Junior World Championships in Moguls, and again 2018, this time in Duved.
- 2017 – Åre hosts the Junior World Championships.
- 2019 – Åre hosts the World Championships, its third.
- 2019 – Plans for dismantling the iconic landmark Kabinbanan cable car were set in motion by owner SkiStar, without any plans for a replacement lift.
- 2021 – Åre along with Östersund was selected to host the 2021 Special Olympics World Winter Games, but cancelled due to financial problems.
- 2026 – Åre along with Stockholm applied to host the 2026 Winter Olympics and 2026 Winter Paralympics, but wasn't selected.

== Night skiing ==
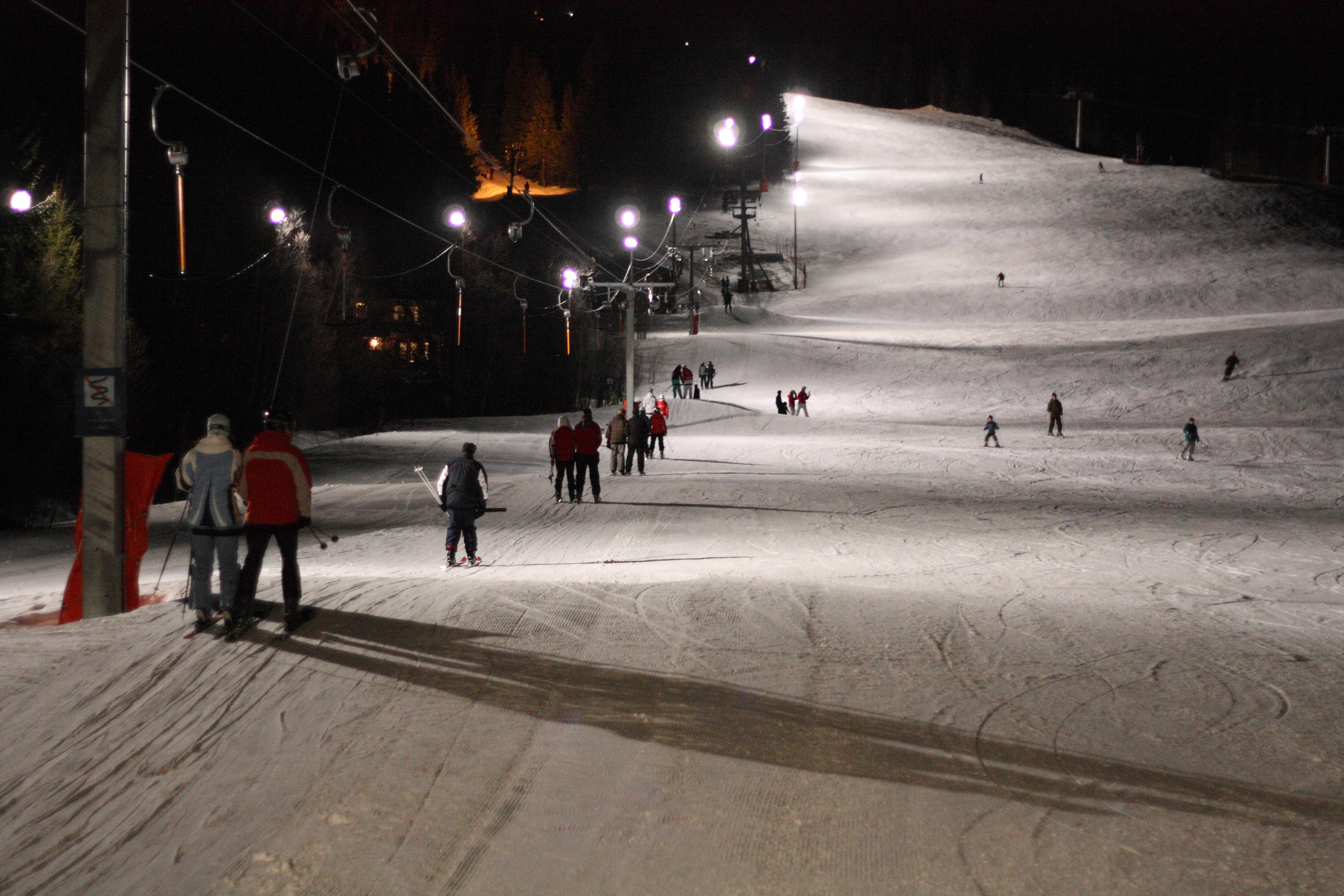
Night skiing in Hamrebacken

During the busy season, there is night skiing every evening between 6 pm and 8 pm. The lifts which are open in the evening varies during the week.

== Areas ==
=== Central Åre ===
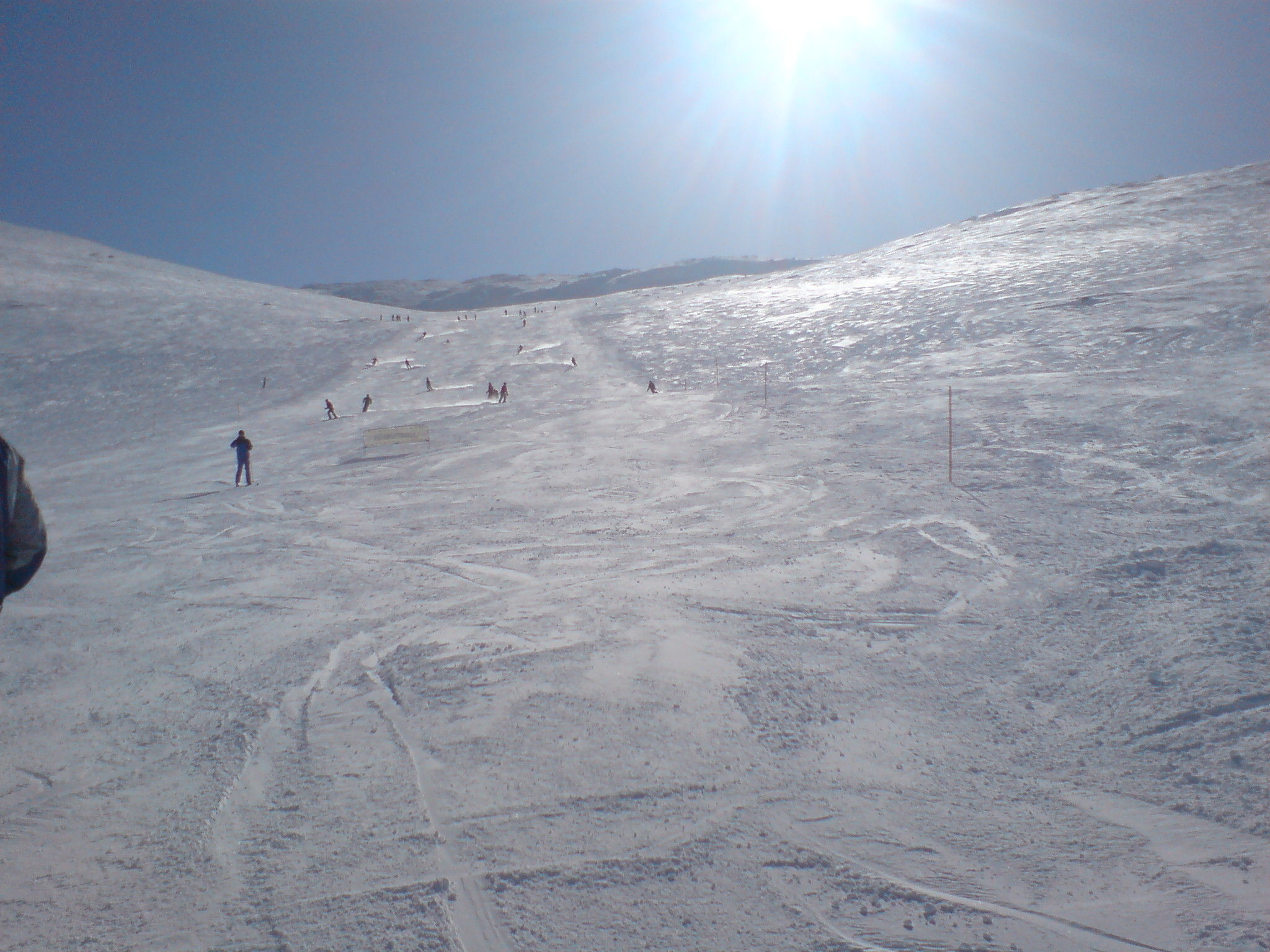
The slope "Tväråvalvet"

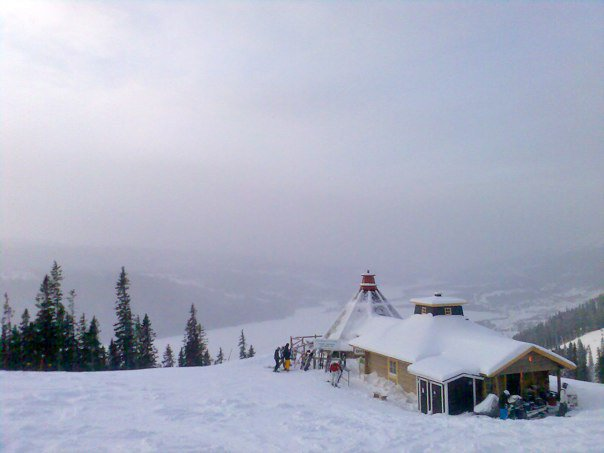
View of the Åre ski area

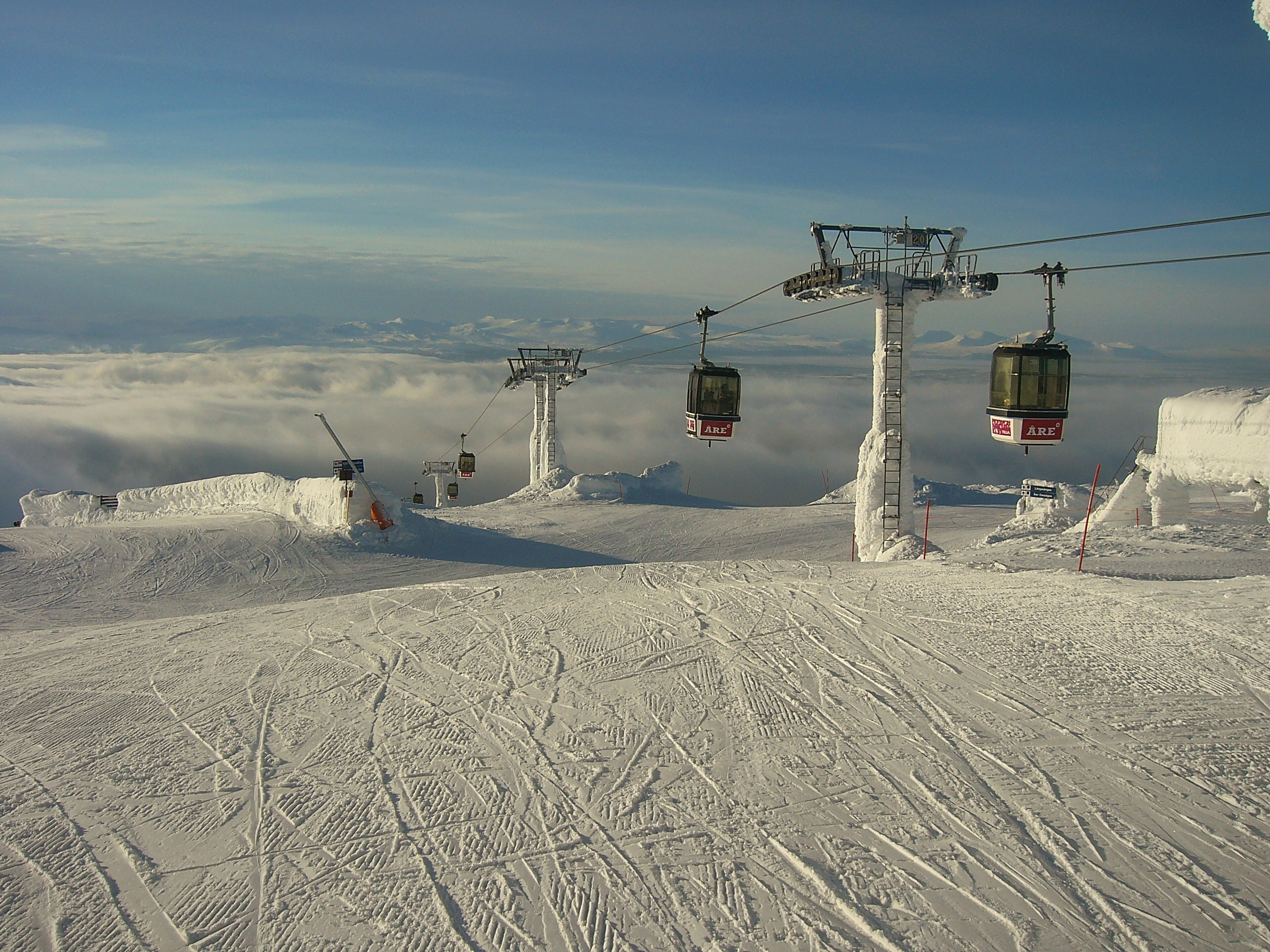
View from the top of the lift system

In Central Åre there are plenty of runs to choose from, both for beginners and advanced skiers. Central Åre is the largest area in the Åre Ski Area. Advanced skiers often prefer the central area with the longest runs which are also fairly steep.

- Lifts in Central Åre
  - Bergbanan
  - Tottliften
  - Fjällgårdsexpressen
  - Hummelliften
  - Kabinbanan
  - Gondolen
  - VM6:an
  - VM8:an
  - Worldcupliften
  - Bräckeliften
  - Lillröda
  - Lillvita
  - Rödhakeliften
  - Rödkulleliften 1
  - Rödkulleliften 2
  - Nedre Tväråvalvsliften
  - Nedre Tväråvalvsliften 2
  - Stendalsliften
  - Ullådalsliften
  - Ullådalsliften 2
  - Övre Tväråvalvsliften

=== Åre Björnen ===
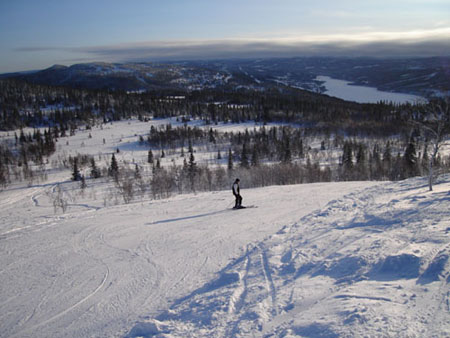
Lake and ski slope on Björnen side of mountain

Åre Björnen is the ski area for the youngest skiers and families. Åre Björnen is connected to Central Åre with lifts.

Lifts in Åre Björnen
Number	Name	Length	Height
B36	Högåsliften	750 m	190 m
B37	Sadellexpressen	1.642 m	310 m
B38	Hermelinliften	1.000 m	190 m
B40	Björnliften	655 m	122 m
B41	Lokattliften	330 m	24 m
B42	Vargliften	430 m	48 m
B43	Mårdenliften	160 m	10 m
B44	Järvenliften	1.114 m	175 m
B45	Nalleliften	144 m	18 m
B46	Copperhill liften	430 m	46 m

=== Tegefjäll ===
Tegefjäll is also suitable for families with small children, the system is connected to the Duved lift system.

- Lifts in Tegefjäll
  - Englandsliften
  - Fjällvallsliften
  - Mini Tege
  - Tegesliften
  - Gunnilliften – at 1.6 kilometers long, this is an unusually long T-bar.

=== Duved ===
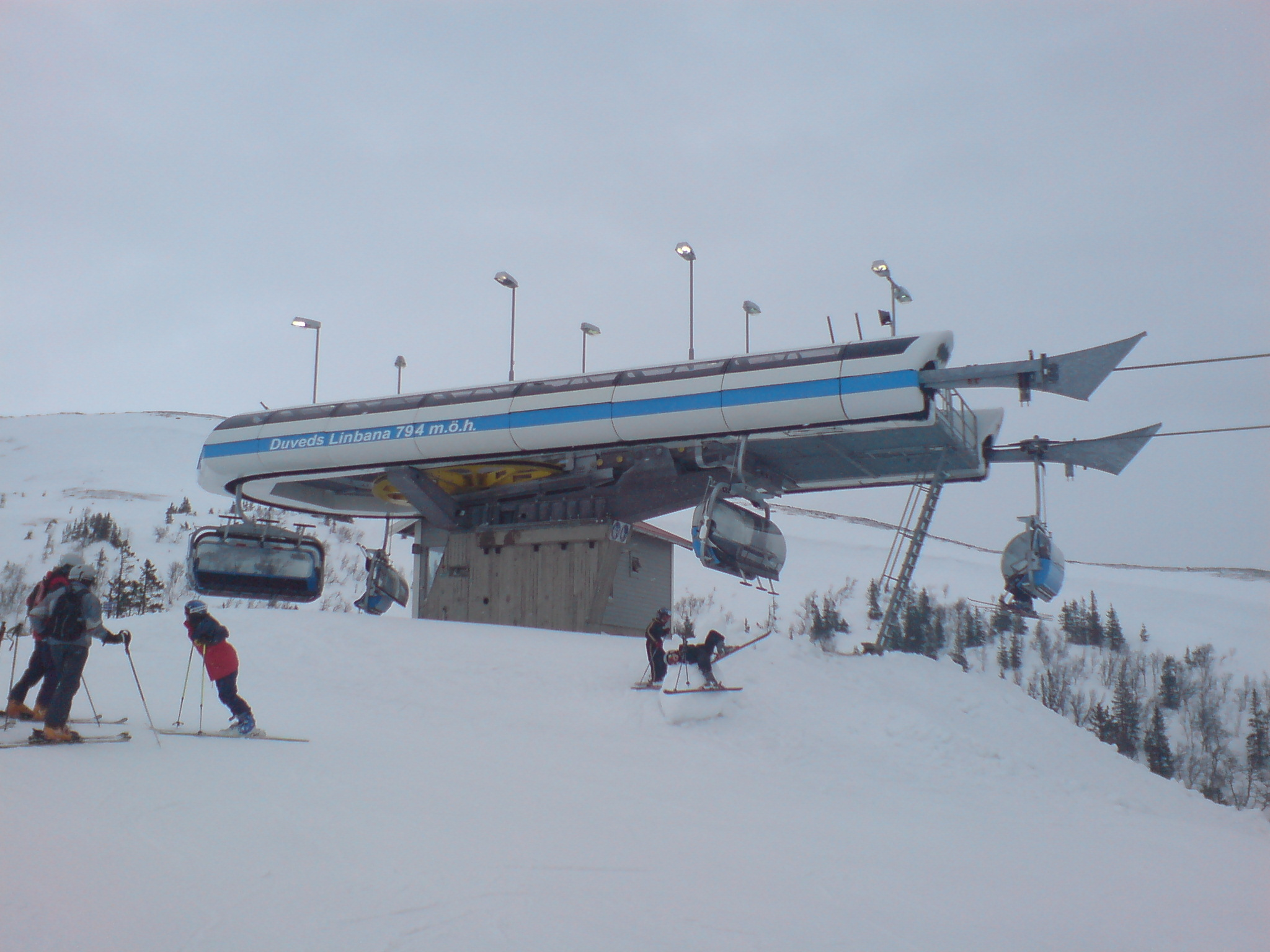
The 6-chair lift "Duveds linbana" in Duved

Duved is a bit bigger than Tegefjäll and offers slopes both for the beginner and the expert. Duved is connected to the Tegefjäll system.

- Lifts in Duved
  - Byliften
  - Torpliften
  - Duveds Linbana
  - Hamreliften
  - Leråliften
