= Åre =

Åre Ååre
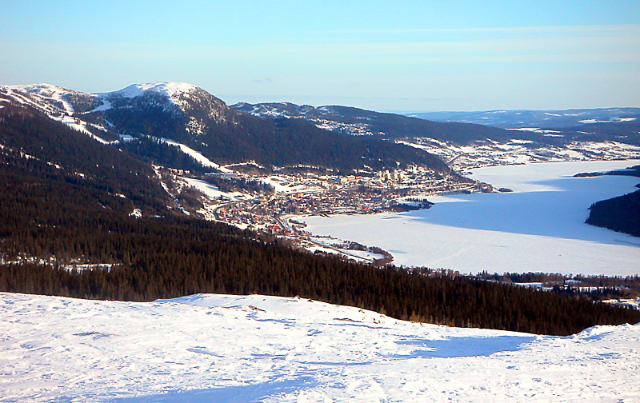
- Åre in February 2003 12:34 PM

- Location within Jämtland Location within Sweden
- Coordinates: 63°24′N 13°05′E
- Country: Sweden
- Province: Jämtland
- County: Jämtland County
- Municipality: Åre Municipality

Area
  - Total: 649 km^{2} (251 sq mi)

Population (31 December 2018)
  - Total: 3,200
  - Density: 505/km^{2} (1,310/sq mi)
- Time zone: UTC+1 (CET)
  - Summer (DST): UTC+2 (CEST)
- Climate: Dfc

Åre (Swedish pronunciation: [ˈôːrɛ]; Southern Sami: Ååre) is a locality and one of the leading Scandinavian ski resorts situated in Åre Municipality, Jämtland County, Sweden with 3,200 inhabitants in 2018. It is, however, not the seat of the municipality, which is Järpen. 25% of the local economy is based on tourism, most notably the downhill skiing and biking resorts in Åre, Duved and Storlien. The growth in tourism has resulted in the development of hotels, recreational and shopping opportunities in the area.

== History ==
In the 12th century the Åre Old Church was built. Saint Olaf the Holy is a historical figure who has influenced the village and for centuries pilgrims passed through the village on their way to Trondheim. Sami people settled in the mid-17th century to take advantage of good reindeer pasture. In the 18th and 19th century the copper mines in Fröå were important industries. Tourism started to grow with the establishment of a railroad in 1882, and Åre's first Grand Hotel was erected in 1896. The kings of Sweden and Norway came to stay in Åre and Storlien for recreational purposes since the 19th century.

== Geography ==
Åre is situated in Åredalen (Åre Valley), approximately 400 metres (1,300 ft) AMSL at the coastline of Åresjön lake. The European route E14 and the Mittbanan railway pass through Åre, connecting the larger towns Östersund and Trondheim.

=== Climate ===
Åre has a subarctic climate (Dfc).

Climate data for Åre-Björnänge V 1991-2020 (403m)
Month	Jan	Feb	Mar	Apr	May	Jun	Jul	Aug	Sep	Oct	Nov	Dec	Year
Mean daily maximum °C (°F)	−2.7 (27.1)	−2.4 (27.7)	1.3 (34.3)	6.3 (43.3)	11.7 (53.1)	16.2 (61.2)	19.3 (66.7)	17.8 (64.0)	12.9 (55.2)	5.9 (42.6)	0.6 (33.1)	−1.8 (28.8)	7.1 (44.8)
Daily mean °C (°F)	−5.7 (21.7)	−5.9 (21.4)	−3.2 (26.2)	1.5 (34.7)	6.6 (43.9)	11.0 (51.8)	14.1 (57.4)	12.9 (55.2)	8.6 (47.5)	2.7 (36.9)	−2.0 (28.4)	−4.7 (23.5)	3.0 (37.4)
Mean daily minimum °C (°F)	−9.3 (15.3)	−9.2 (15.4)	−6.7 (19.9)	−2.3 (27.9)	2.2 (36.0)	6.8 (44.2)	9.5 (49.1)	8.6 (47.5)	5.0 (41.0)	0.1 (32.2)	−4.8 (23.4)	−8.2 (17.2)	−0.7 (30.8)
Source: NOAA

== Tourism ==
Tourism in Åre started as King Oscar II in 1882 supervised construction of the Östersund–Trondheim railway. With this new railway, many people came to Åre to breathe the fresh air and to walk to the top of Åreskutan. They were soon known as "air-guests" (Sw. luftgäster).

There was no hotel, but in 1888 Albin Wettergren opened a restaurant by the railway station. In 1891, Åre Tourist Station opened and even more guests were attracted to the village.

A lady from Östersund saw this increasing tourism as a great opportunity to open a hotel and did so in 1895. It was called "Hotell Åreskutan". Albin Wettergren opened a hotel ("Grand Hotell") as well. These were only a few of all the hotels that were going to be founded in Åre.

In 1910, the funicular Åre Bergbana was built and was the third one in Sweden after Skansens Bergbana in Stockholm (1898) and the one in Kiruna (1907). This was a more convenient way for the air-guests to reach the top of Åreskutan.

In 2008, the hotel Copperhill Mountain Lodge opened on the top of the Förberget hill. Designed by American architect Peter Bohlin, it is the only mountain hotel in Scandinavia referred to as a "Design Hotel".

== Winter events ==
Taking advantage of the Åreskutan fell, Åre Ski Area has become the major center for alpine skiing in Sweden, sporting more than 30 modern ski-lifts. It hosted the Alpine World Championships in 1954, 2007 and 2019, and has hosted more than 100 FIS Alpine Ski World Cup events throughout the years. On 9–10 March 2012, the Freestyle FIS World Cup was held at the Slalombacken slalom course close to the village centre, and on 18 Feb 2020 a sprint race in the FIS Cross-Country World Cup was held at the same place.

=== 2021 Special Olympics World Winter Games ===
Åre along with Östersund were initially selected to host the 2021 Special Olympics World Winter Games. It would have marked the first time that Sweden has ever hosted the Special Olympics. However, due to a variety of issues including lack of funding, on 19 December 2019, the event will not take place in Sweden. Instead it will take place in Kazan, Russia and was delayed to 2022.

=== Winter Olympics ===
Åre has also been the site for the alpine events in Sweden's eight failed bids to host the Olympic Winter Games, including for the 1984, 1988, 1992, 1994, 1998, 2002, 2022, and 2026 editions. This is because Åre has the only piste in Sweden suitable for top-level downhill races.

=== Notable people ===
- Reine Barkered – Former professional skier from Duved in Åre municipality and winner of Freeride World Tour 2012
- Lars-Börje Eriksson – Olympic alpine skiing bronze medalist in Super-G
- Henrik Harlaut – Professional freestyle skier and X-Games Champion
- Henrik Lundqvist – Former New York Rangers goaltender, gold medalist in the Olympics 2006, and Vezina trophy winner 2012 (NHL). Twin brother of Joel Lundqvist
- Joel Lundqvist – Former ice hockey player Dallas Stars and Frölunda HC as checking forward and captain. Two-time world champion in ice hockey and twin brother of Henrik Lundqvist
- Jon Olsson - Former professional freestyle skier, X-Games Champion and social media influencer
- Henrik Windstedt – winner of the 2008 Freeride World Tour

== Outdoor attractions ==
Åre has since the 1990s become the largest mountainbike resort in Sweden. In 1999 it was the host for the UCI Mountain Bike & Trials World Championships and it hosted the Nordic Championships 2007. There are numerous graded downhill cycling trails. The Åre Bikepark is open from 1 May until 15 October and is the host for the Mayhem Festival.

During summer Åre can also sport hiking, paragliding, kayaking, and a golf course about 15 minutes from the village. In July every year there is a multisport competition in Åre – Åre Extreme Challenge. It counts as the Scandinavian championship in multisport.

In 2008 Åre was appointed as one of the ten best ski-resorts in the world at the list from the magazine Condé Nast Traveller

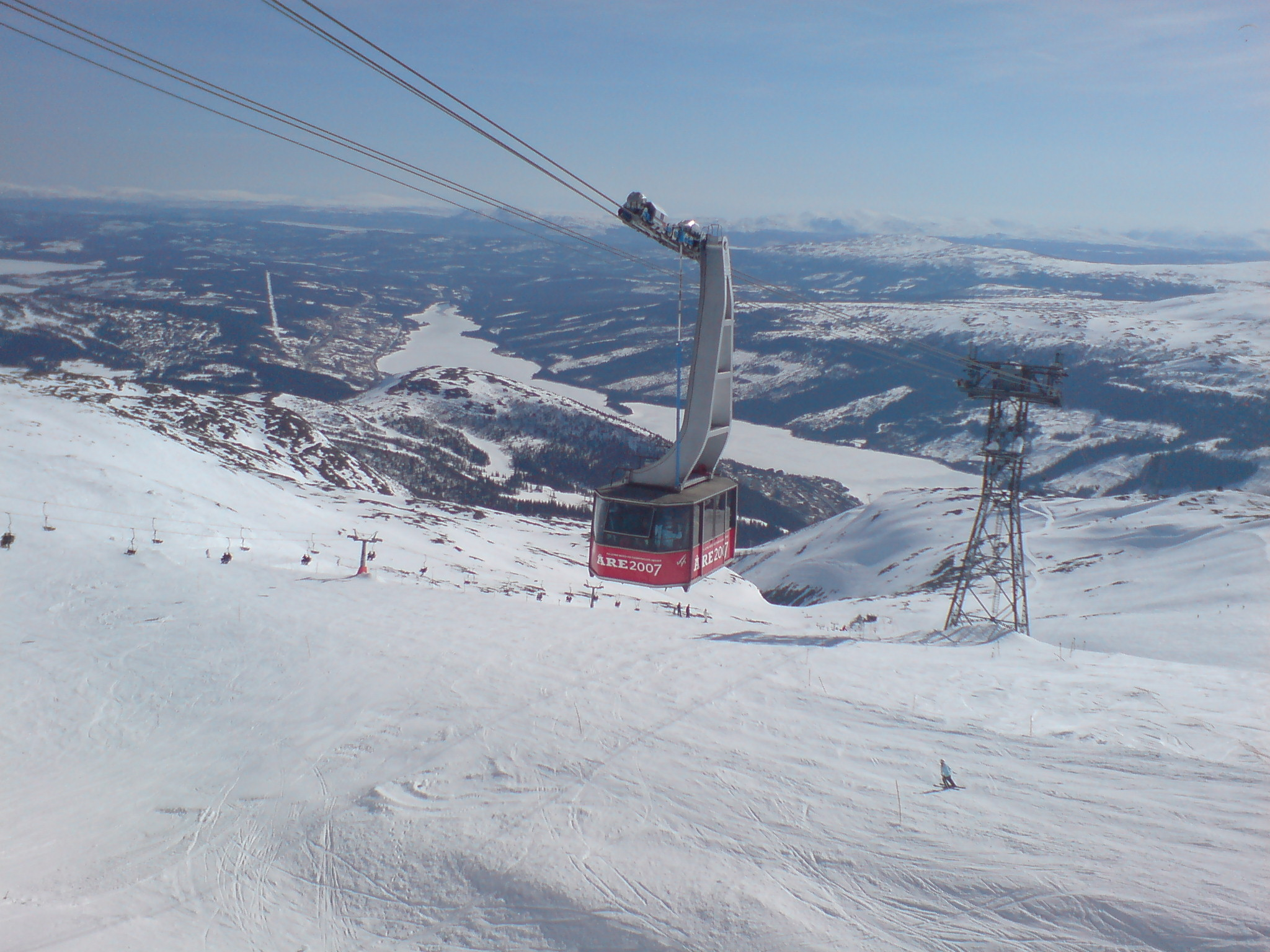
Åre cable car

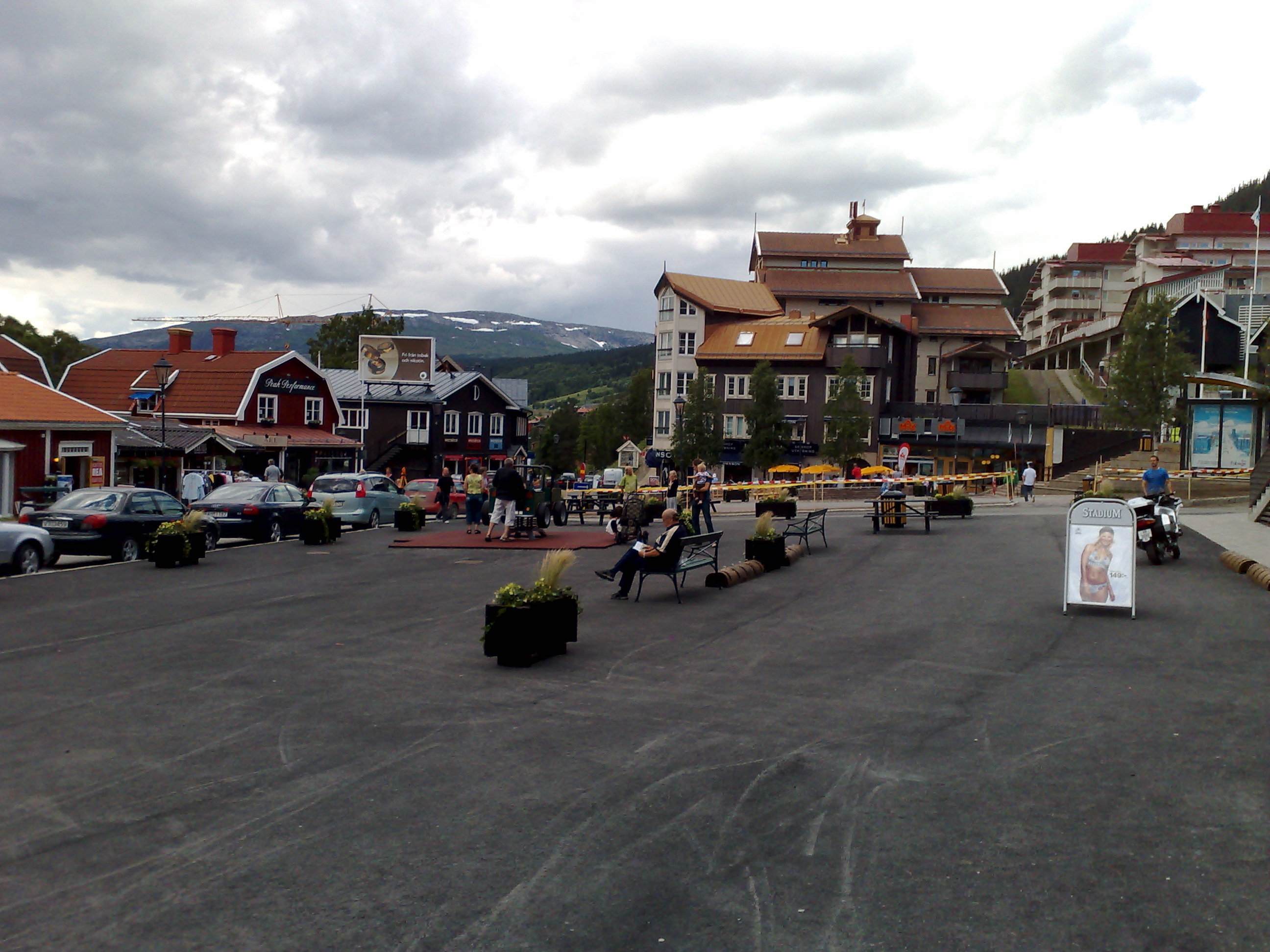
Åre central square

== Transport ==
The nearest airport is situated 99 kilometres (62 mi) eastward, on the island of Frösön in Östersund. Åre Östersund Airport is an international airport and the ninth biggest in Sweden with roughly 390 000 passengers (2005).

The European route E14 runs through Åre from Trondheim via Östersund to Sundsvall, where it merges with the European route E45.

Åre also has a train station. Norrtåg operates the Mittbanan railway from Storlien (where Trondheim-bound diesel trains connect), via Åre and Östersund to Sundsvall. Åre is connected to Stockholm, Gothenburg and Malmö through long distance SJ 3000 (higher-speed trains) and InterCity. Åre is also served by seasonal overnight trains.

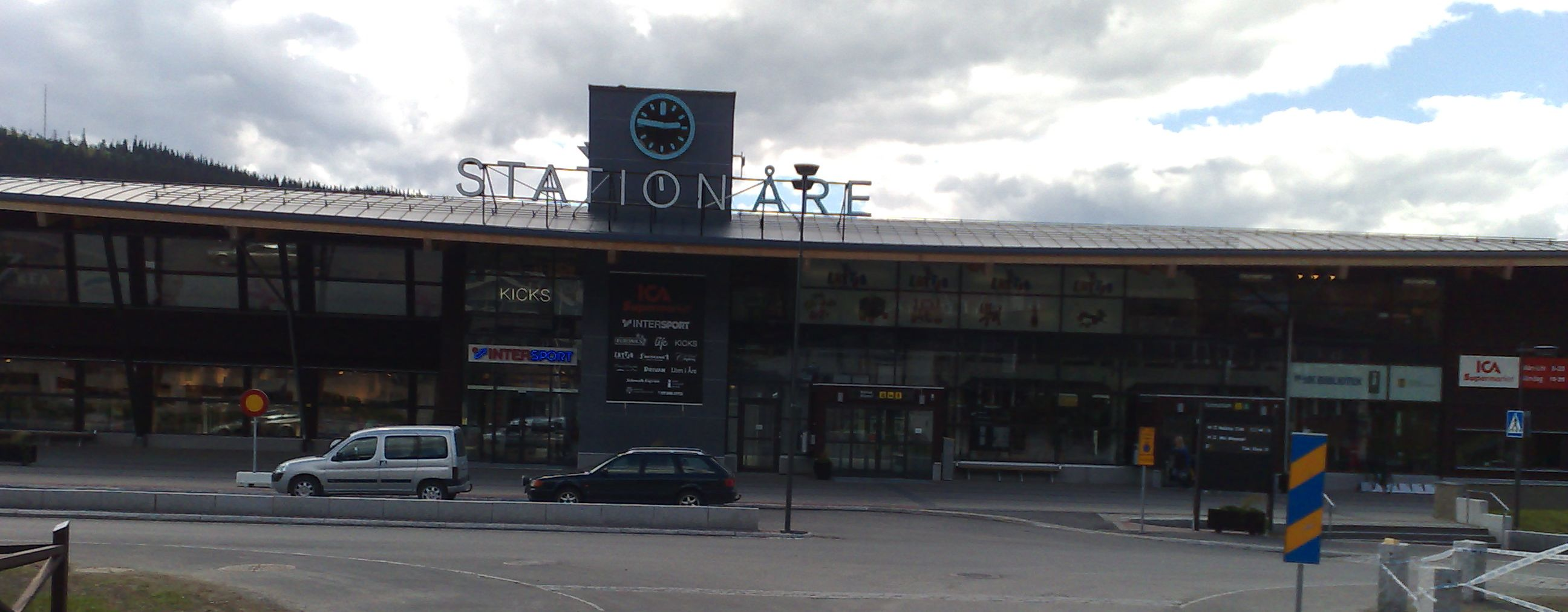
Åre railway station

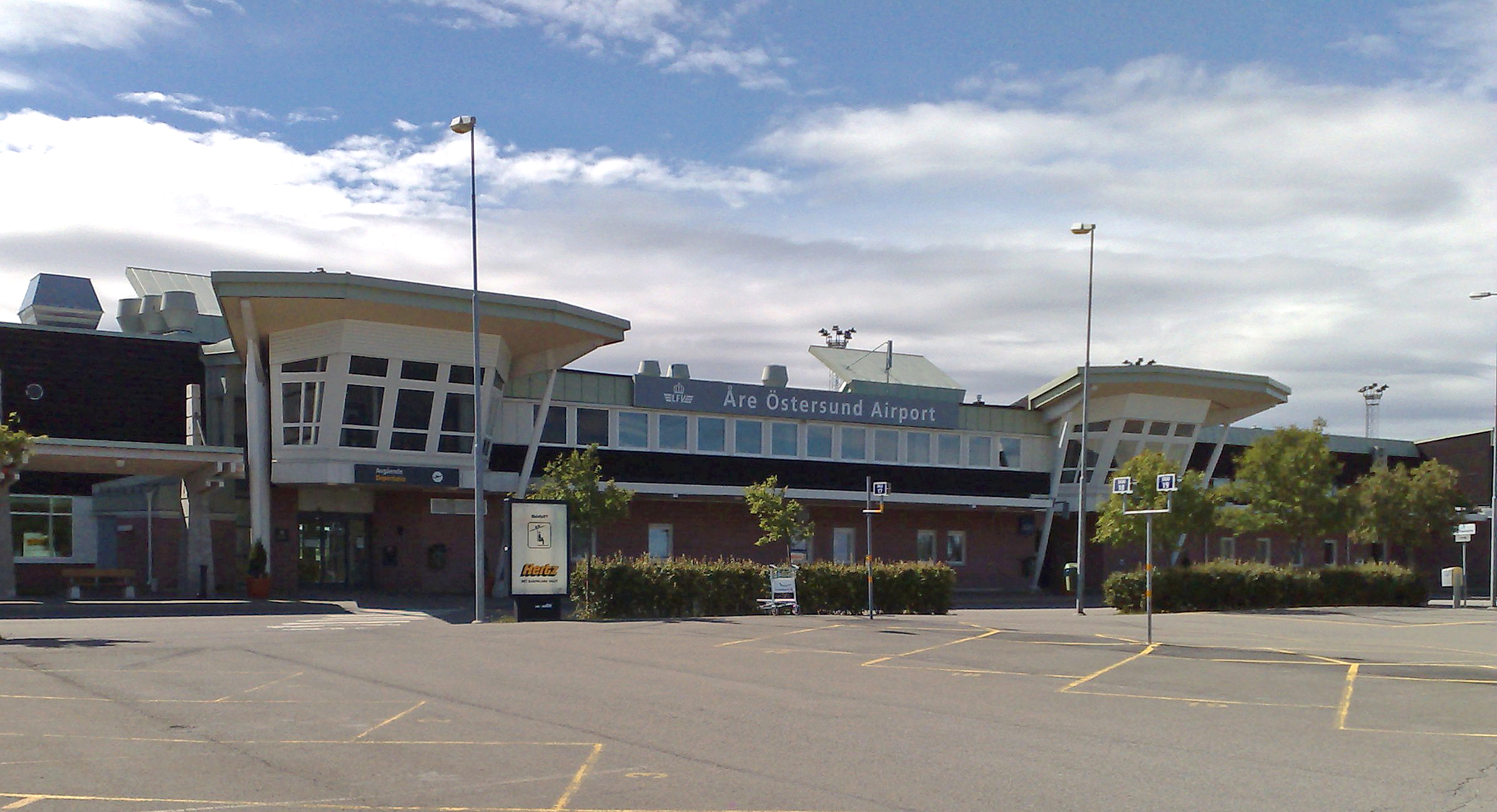
Åre Östersund Airport terminal
