= Åre Bergbana =

Funicular railway in Jämtland County, Sweden

Coordinates: 63°24′2.14″N 13°4′43.81″E

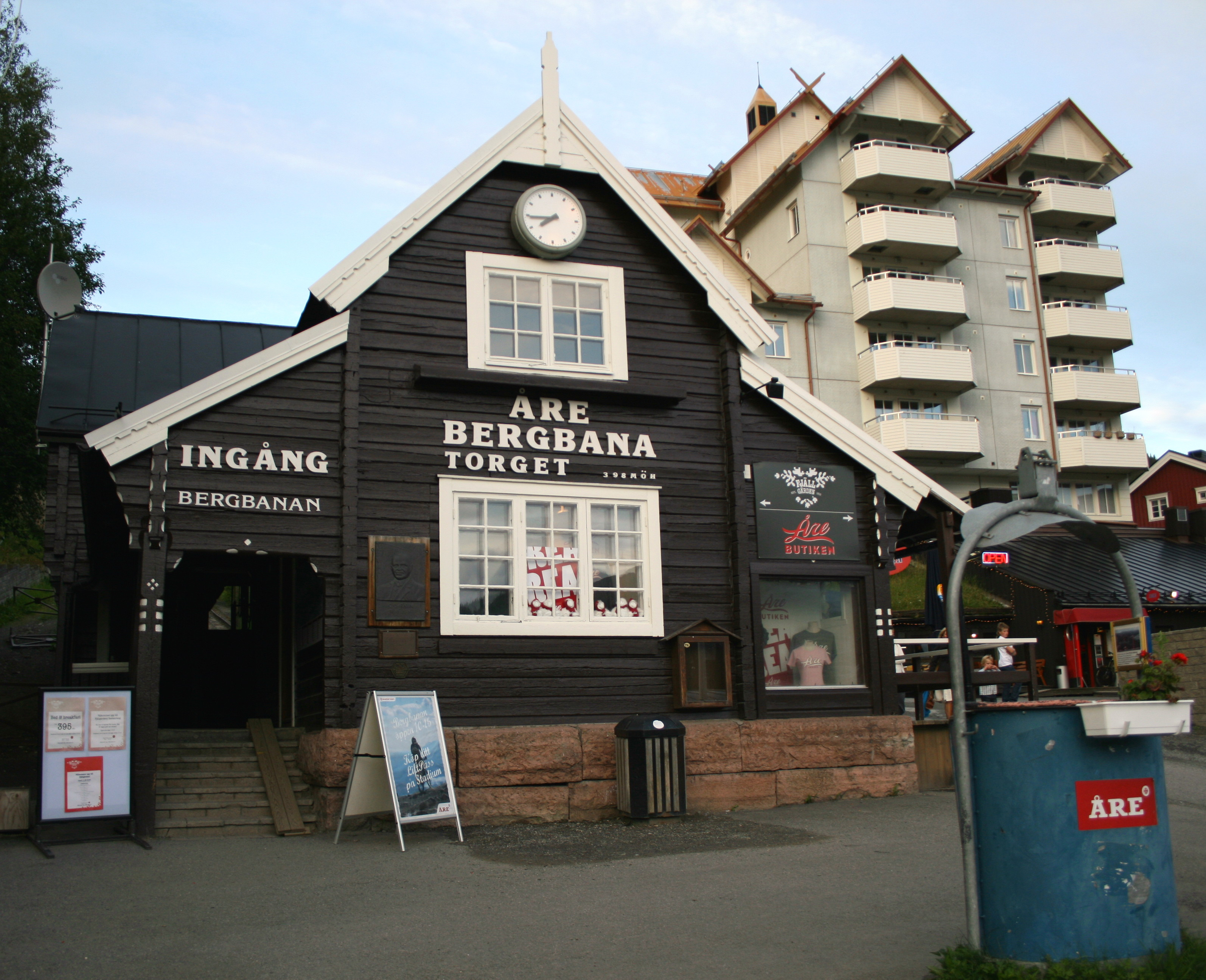
Åre Town Square station

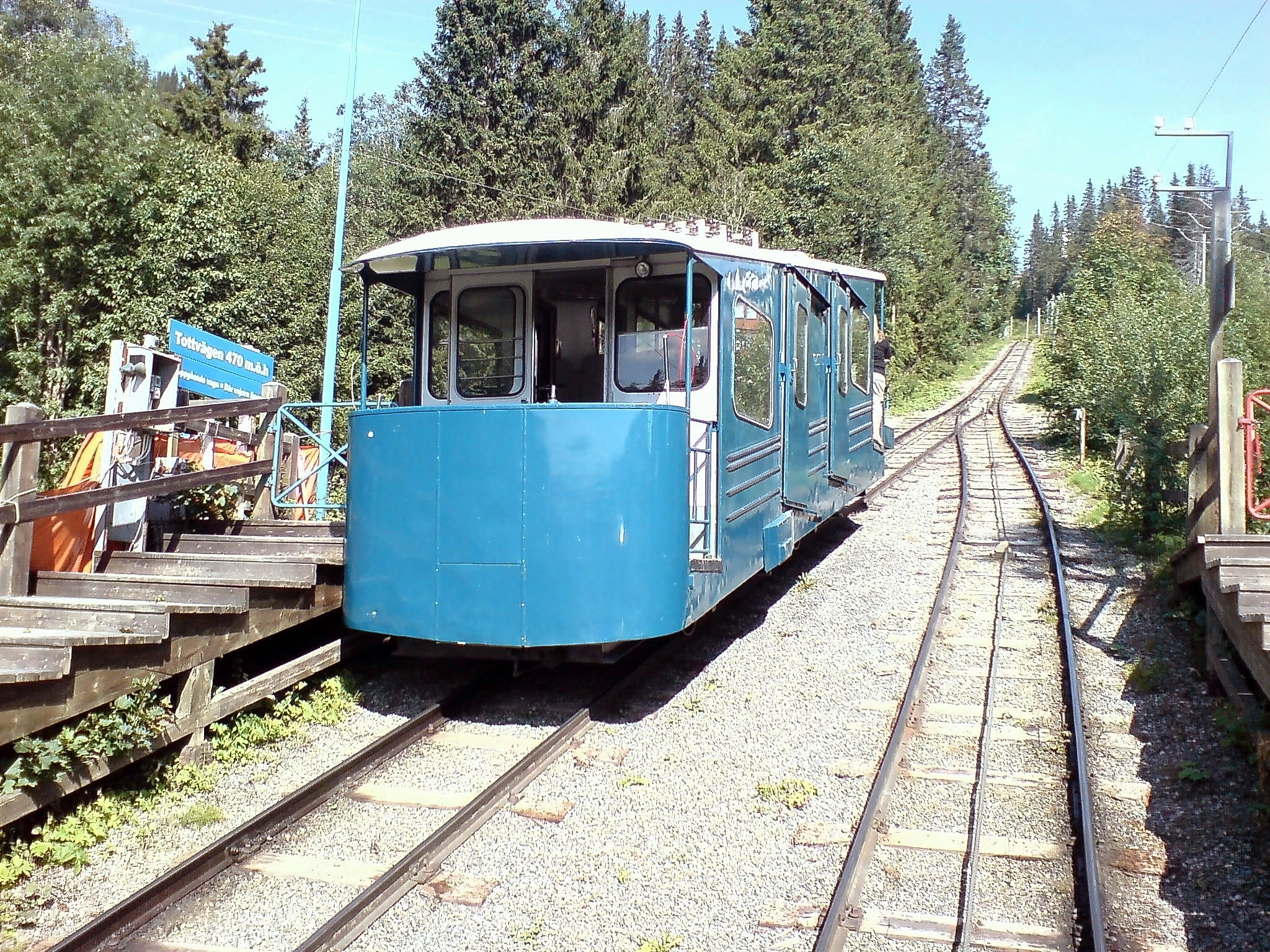
Funicular car and rails

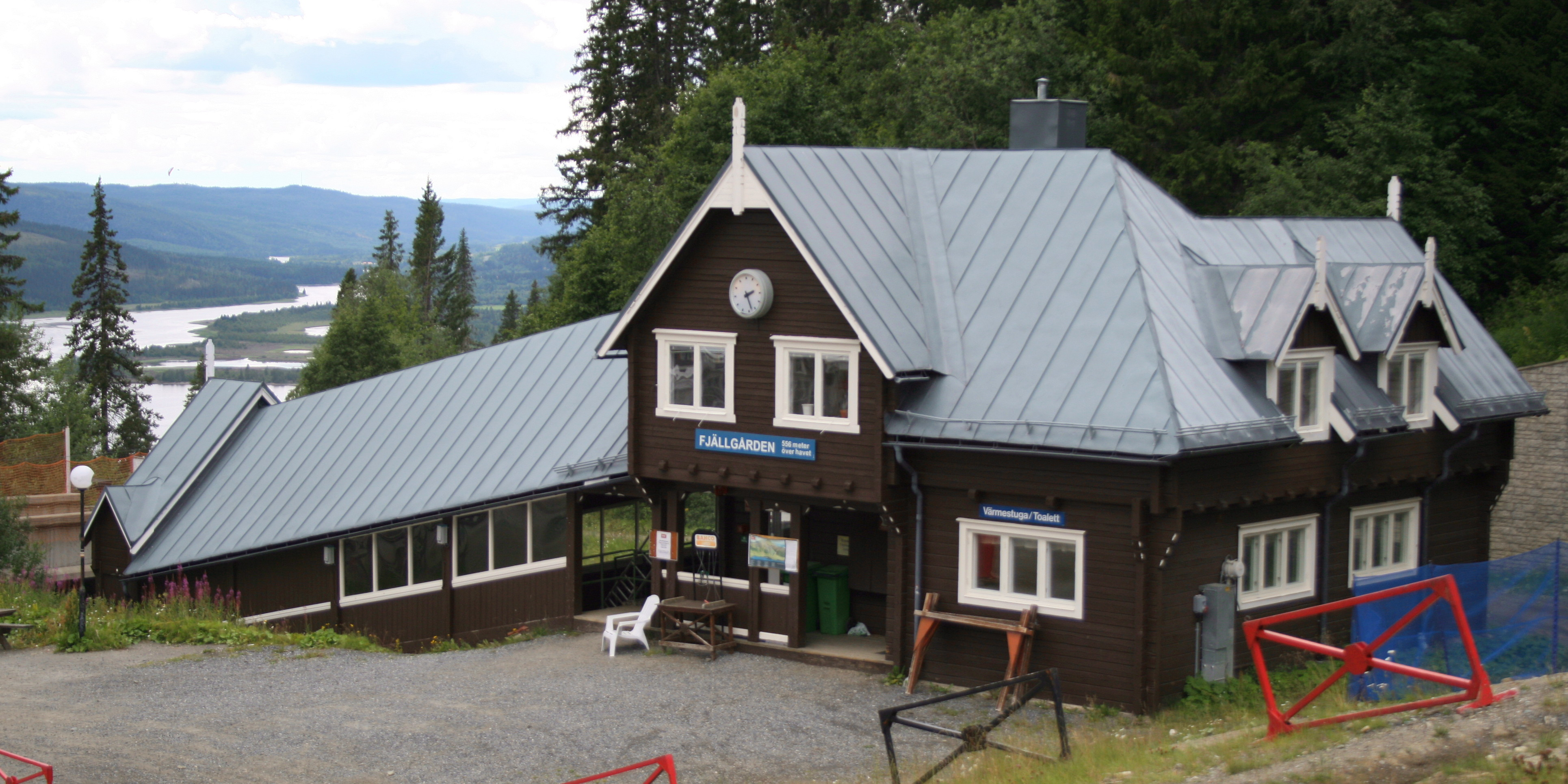
Fjällgården station

Åre Bergbana is a funicular railway located in Åre, Jämtland County, Sweden. It is 790-metre (2,590 ft) long and runs between the town square at 398 metres (1,306 ft) amsl and the hotel Fjällgården at 556 metres (1,824 ft) amsl. The funicular was built as the first fixed link up to the fell by Von Roll from 1908 to 1910 at a cost of 230,000 SEK and inaugurated 7 March 1910.

Åre Bergbana has enjoyed the status of byggnadsminne (listed building) since 22 August 2008. This includes the funicular itself, the two station buildings, a park and the so-called Grottan (English: The Cave) — the street going from the town square station to the old railway station.

== See also ==
- List of funicular railways
