= Åreskutan =

Mountain in Sweden

Coordinates: 63°25′51.30″N 13°5′35.80″E

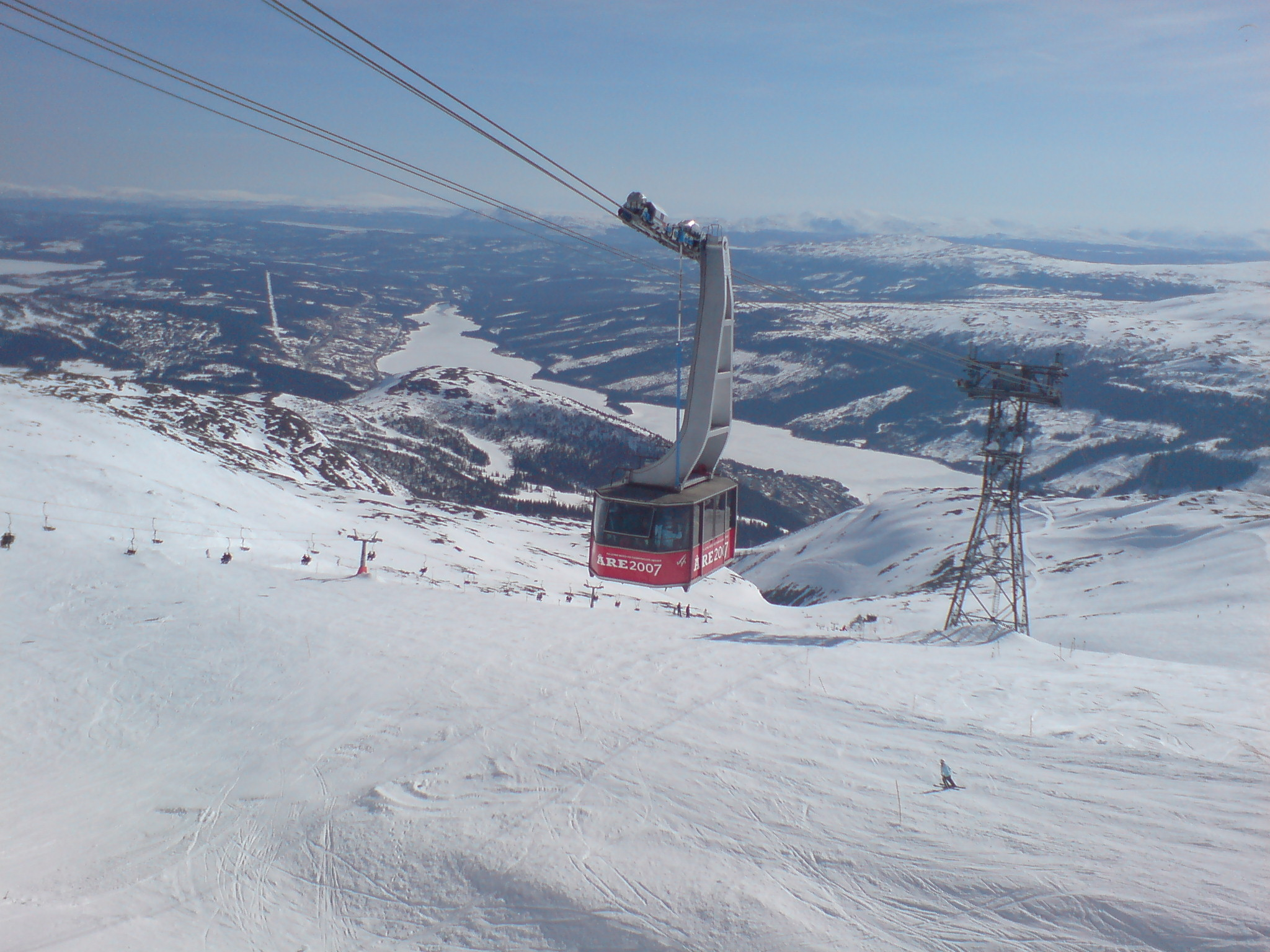
The cable car on Åreskutan

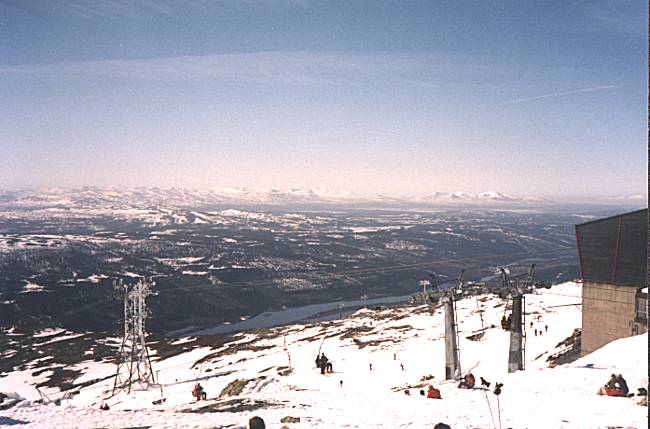
Skiing at the mountain Åreskutan in May 2000.

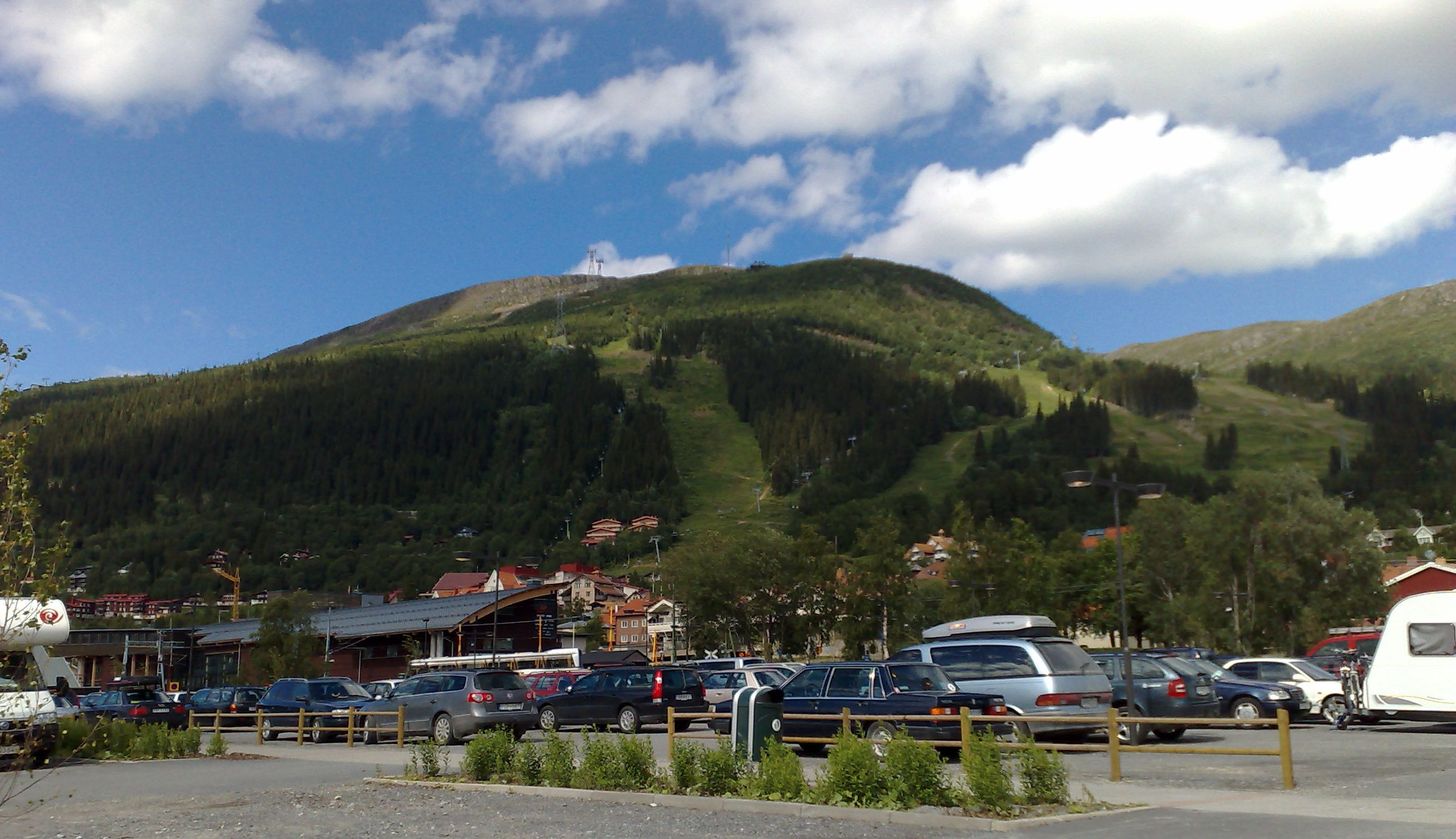
Åreskutan in the summer

Åreskutan is a 1,420-metre-high (4,660 ft) mountain at Åre in Jämtland in central Sweden. It is one of the better-known mountains in Sweden, with a history of winter sport tourism dating back to the 1800s. The mountain (and the village of Åre itself) is easily accessible by train. The mountain massif features the largest ski resort area in Sweden.

Åre has hosted three Alpine World Ski Championships:

1954 FIS Alpine World Ski Championships.

2007 FIS Alpine World Ski Championships.

2019 FIS Alpine World Ski Championships.

In 1999, Åre was the host of the UCI Mountain Bike & Trials World Championships.

== Climate ==
Climate data for Åreskutan Aut 1991-2020 (1280m)
Month	Jan	Feb	Mar	Apr	May	Jun	Jul	Aug	Sep	Oct	Nov	Dec	Year
Mean daily maximum °C (°F)	−6.1 (21.0)	−6.5 (20.3)	−4.5 (23.9)	−0.7 (30.7)	3.7 (38.7)	8.4 (47.1)	11.9 (53.4)	10.2 (50.4)	5.5 (41.9)	−0.1 (31.8)	−3.5 (25.7)	−5.3 (22.5)	1.1 (33.9)
Daily mean °C (°F)	−7.2 (19.0)	−8.0 (17.6)	−6.6 (20.1)	−3.3 (26.1)	0.8 (33.4)	5.2 (41.4)	8.7 (47.7)	7.6 (45.7)	3.4 (38.1)	−1.5 (29.3)	−4.9 (23.2)	−6.7 (19.9)	−1.0 (30.1)
Mean daily minimum °C (°F)	−9.5 (14.9)	−10.0 (14.0)	−8.6 (16.5)	−5.8 (21.6)	−2.2 (28.0)	2.3 (36.1)	5.6 (42.1)	4.6 (40.3)	0.9 (33.6)	−3.6 (25.5)	−6.8 (19.8)	−8.5 (16.7)	−3.5 (25.8)
Source: NOAA
