= Freeride World Tour =

Annual series of skiing and snowboarding events

- Genre: Freeride skiing and snowboarding
- Locations: Europe; occasionally in North America and Asia
- Inaugurated: 1996 (snowboard only); 2004 (ski and snowboard)
- Founder: (Switzerland) Nicolas Hale-Woods
- Current champions: (African Union) Ben Richards (ski men) (France) Victor de le Rue (snowboard men) (Canada) Justine Dufour-Lapointe (ski women) (France) Noémie Equy (snowboard women)
- Organizer: International Ski Federation (FIS)
- Sponsors: Peak Performance
- Website: www.freerideworldtour.com

The Freeride World Tour, also referred to as the FWT Pro or simply the FWT, is an annual series of events in which freeride skiers and snowboarders compete for individual event wins, as well as the overall title of Freeride World Champion in their respective genders and disciplines. The events take place on off-piste terrain – ungroomed snow on steep slopes, often featuring areas of high exposure.

The Freeride World Tour was founded in 1996 as the Verbier Extreme, and was a snowboard only contest until 2004. The first event series under the Freeride World Tour name took place in 2008. For the 2013 season, the Freeride World Tour merged with the Freeskiing World Tour and The North Face Masters of Snowboarding, combining all three tours under one global championship series.

A separate class of FWT Qualifier competitions provides the Tour with new rookies each season, with a small number of athletes from each division and region being selected to compete in FWT Challenger events. The top finishers after each Challenger circuit are invited to join the following season's Freeride World Tour. Limited wild card spots have historically been offered to established riders.

The FWT Junior circuit has had many competitions all over the world, as well as an invite-only FWT Junior World Championships held annually since 2012.

The International Ski and Snowboard Federation bought the Freeride World Tour in 2022.

== Tour results ==
=== 2026 Season ===
Location	Dates	Event Winners			
Location	Dates	Ski Men	Snowboard Men	Ski Women	Snowboard Women
(Spain) Baqueira Beret	Jan 14	(New Zealand) Ben Richards	(Switzerland) Liam Rivera	(Canada) Justine Dufour-Lapointe	(United States) Mia Jones
(France) Val Thorens	Jan 25	(New Zealand) Ben Richards	(France) Victor de Le Rue	(Argentina) Agostina Vietti	(France) Noémie Equy
(Georgia (country)) Georgia	Cancelled due to unstable snowpack				
(Austria) Fieberbrunn	Cancelled due to unstable snowpack				
(United States) Haines	Mar 13	(United States) Toby Rafford	(France) Victor de Le Rue	(Switzerland) Sybille Blanjean	(United States) Mia Jones
(Switzerland) Verbier	Mar 28	(New Zealand) Ben Richards	(Switzerland) Liam Rivera	(France) Lou Barin	(United States) Mia Jones

2026 Final Rankings
Place	Ski Men	Snowboard Men	Ski Women	Snowboard Women
1st	(New Zealand) Ben Richards	(France) Victor de Le Rue	(France) Lou Barin	(United States) Mia Jones
2nd	(United States) Toby Rafford	(Switzerland) Liam Rivera	(Switzerland) Sybille Blanjean	(France) Anna Martinez
3rd	(United States) Ross Tester	(France) Sacha Balicco	(Canada) Justine Dufour-Lapointe	(France) Noémie Equy

=== 2025 Season ===
Location	Dates	Event Winners			
Location	Dates	Ski Men	Snowboard Men	Ski Women	Snowboard Women
(Spain) Baqueira Beret	Jan 17	(United States) Ross Tester	(France) Victor de Le Rue	(Canada) Justine Dufour-Lapointe	(France) Noémie Equy
(France) Val Thorens	Jan 29	(Switzerland) Martin Bender	(France) Enzo Nilo	(France) Astrid Cheylus	(France) Marion Haerty
(Canada) Kicking Horse	Feb 07	(Canada) Marcus Goguen	(France) Victor de Le Rue	(United States) Molly Armanino	(Australia) Michaela Davis-Meehan
(Georgia (country)) Georgia	Mar 01	(Canada) Marcus Goguen	(United Kingdom) Cody Bramwell	(Poland) Zuzanna Witych	(France) Noémie Equy
(Austria) Fieberbrunn	Mar 07	Cancelled	(Switzerland) Liam Rivera	(United States) Lily Bradley	(France) Noémie Equy
(Switzerland) Verbier	Mar 20	(Canada) WeiTien Ho	(United Kingdom) Cody Bramwell	(Switzerland) Jenna Keller	(France) Noémie Equy

2025 Final Rankings
Place	Ski Men	Snowboard Men	Ski Women	Snowboard Women
1st	(Canada) Marcus Goguen	(France) Victor de Le Rue	(Canada) Justine Dufour-Lapointe	(France) Noémie Equy
2nd	(Switzerland) Martin Bender	(United Kingdom) Cody Bramwell	(Switzerland) Jenna Keller	(Australia) Michaela Davis-Meehan
3rd	(United States) Toby Rafford	(Switzerland) Liam Rivera	(France) Astrid Cheylus	(Spain) Núria Castan Baron

=== 2024 Season ===
Location	Dates	Event Winners			
Location	Dates	Ski Men	Snowboard Men	Ski Women	Snowboard Women
(Spain) Baqueira Beret	Cancelled due to insufficient snow				
(Switzerland) Verbier	Jan 27 - 28	(Germany) Max Hitzig	(France) Victor de Le Rue	(Poland) Zuzanna Witych	(Spain) Núria Castan Baron
(Andorra) Ordino Arcalís	Cancelled due to insufficient snow				
(Canada) Kicking Horse	Feb 14 - 20	(Germany) Max Hitzig	(France) Victor de Le Rue	(France) Astrid Cheylus	(France) Anna Martinez
(Georgia (country)) Georgia	Mar 01 - 07	(Canada) Marcus Goguen	(France) Victor de Le Rue	(Switzerland) Sybille Blanjean	(Spain) Núria Castan Baron
(Austria) Fieberbrunn	Mar 12 - 18	(New Zealand) Ben Richards	(France) Victor de Le Rue	(France) Astrid Cheylus	(Canada) Erin Sauve
(Switzerland) Verbier	Mar 23 - 31	(Canada) Marcus Goguen	(United States) Jonathan Penfield	(Norway) Hedvig Wessel	(Canada) Erin Sauve

2024 Final Rankings
Place	Ski Men	Snowboard Men	Ski Women	Snowboard Women
1st	(Germany) Max Hitzig	(France) Victor de Le Rue	(Norway) Hedvig Wessel	(Canada) Erin Sauve
2nd	(Canada) Marcus Goguen	(United States) Jonathan Penfield	(France) Astrid Cheylus	(Spain) Núria Castan Baron
3rd	(New Zealand) Ben Richards	(Switzerland) Liam Rivera	(Poland) Zuzanna Witych	(France) Anna Martinez

=== 2023 Season ===
Location	Dates	Event Winners			
Location	Dates	Ski Men	Snowboard Men	Ski Women	Snowboard Women
(Spain) Baqueira Beret	Jan 27 - Feb 1	(Sweden) Max Palm	(United States) Michael Mawn	(United States) Addison Rafford	(Canada) Katie Anderson
(Andorra) Ordino Arcalís	Feb 1	(Austria) Valentin Rainer	(France) Ludovic Guillot-Diat	(Canada) Justine Dufour-Lapointe	(Canada) Katie Anderson
(Canada) Kicking Horse	Feb 16 - 21	(Germany) Max Hitzig	(Switzerland) Liam Rivera	(France) Megane Betend	(New Zealand) Michaela Davis-Meehan
(Austria) Fieberbrunn	Mar 10 - 16	(United States) Andrew Pollard	(United States) Jonathan Penfield	(Canada) Justine Dufour-Lapointe	(Canada) Katie Anderson
(Switzerland) Verbier	Cancelled due to unsafe snow conditions				

2023 Final Rankings
Place	Ski Men	Snowboard Men	Ski Women	Snowboard Women
1st	(Austria) Valentin Rainer	(France) Ludovic Guillot-Diat	(Canada) Justine Dufour-Lapointe	(Canada) Katie Anderson
2nd	(Switzerland) Maxime Chabloz	(United States) Jonathan Penfield	(United States) Molly Armanino	(Russia) Anna Orlova
3rd	(United States) Andrew Pollard	(Switzerland) Liam Rivera	(France) Megane Betend	(France) Estelle Rizzolio

=== 2022 Season ===
Location	Dates	Event Winners			
Location	Dates	Ski Men	Snowboard Men	Ski Women	Snowboard Women
(Spain) Baqueira Beret	Jan 21 - 27	(Sweden) Max Palm	(United States) Michael Mawn	(Canada) Olivia McNeill	(United States) Erika Vikander
(Andorra) Ordino Arcalís	Jan 29 - Feb 4	(Switzerland) Maxime Chabloz	(United States) Blake Moller	(New Zealand) Jessica Hotter	(France) Tiphanie Perrotin
(Canada) Kicking Horse	Feb 11 - 16	(Switzerland) Maxime Chabloz	(France) Camille Armand	(United States) Lily Bradley	(United States) Erika Vikander
(Austria) Fieberbrunn	Mar 13 - 19	(Sweden) Carl Regnér Eriksson	(United States) Blake Moller	(New Zealand) Jessica Hotter	(France) Tiphanie Perrotin
(Switzerland) Verbier	Mar 25 - Apr 2	(Switzerland) Maxime Chabloz	(United States) Blake Moller	(Switzerland) Sybille Blanjean	(Austria) Manuela Mandl

2022 Final Rankings
Place	Ski Men	Snowboard Men	Ski Women	Snowboard Women
1st	(Switzerland) Maxime Chabloz	(United States) Blake Moller	(New Zealand) Jessica Hotter	(France) Tiphanie Perrotin
2nd	(Sweden) Carl Regnér Eriksson	(France) Camille Armand	(Norway) Hedvig Wessel	(United States) Erika Vikander
3rd	(United States) Ross Tester	(United Kingdom) Cody Bramwell	(Canada) Olivia McNeill	(Austria) Manuela Mandl

== Tour locations ==
Key: X – Event Staged. C – Event cancelled. M – Event moved.

Location	2008	2009	2010	2011	2012	2013	2014	2015	2016	2017	2018	2019	2020	2021	2022	2023	2024	2025	2026
(Spain) Baqueira Beret															X	X	C	X	X
(France) Chamonix			X	X	X	X	X	X	X	X									
(Italy) Courmayeur					X	X	X												
(United States) Crested Butte		X																	
(Austria) Fieberbrunn		X		X	X	X	X	X	X	X	X	X	X	X	X	X	X	X	C
(Georgia (country)) Georgia																	X	X	C
(United States) Haines								X	X	X									X
(Japan) Hakuba												M (Note: Postponed due to weather and restaged in Kicking Horse.)	X	C					
(Canada) Kicking Horse											X	X	X	C	X	X	X	X	
(United States) Kirkwood				X		X	X												
(United States) Mammoth Mountain	X																		
(Andorra) Ordino Arcalís								X	X	X	X	X (Note: 2 competitions staged due to COVID-19 pandemic calendar impacts.)	X	X	X	X	C		
(Canada) Revelstoke					X	X	X												
(Norway) Røldal					X														
(United States) Snowbird		X																	
(Russia) Sochi	X	X	X	X															
(United States) Palisades Tahoe		X	X																
(Switzerland) St. Moritz				X															
(France) Tignes	X	X																	
(France) Val Thorens																		X	X
(Switzerland) Verbier	X	X	X	X	X	X	X	X	X	X	X	X	C	X	X	C	X (Note: 2 competitions (season opener, season finale) staged due to cancellation of season opener in Baqueira Beret.)	X	X

== Tour champions ==
=== By season ===
Season	Men		Women	
Season	Ski	Snowboard	Ski	Snowboard
2008	(Sweden) Henrik Windstedt	(France) Xavier de Le Rue	(United States) Elyse Saugstad	(Switzerland) Ruth Leisibach
2009	(France) Aurélien Ducroz	(France) Xavier de Le Rue	(Norway) Ane Enderud	(United States) Susan Mol
2010	(France) Candide Thovex	(France) Xavier de Le Rue	(Norway) Ane Enderud	(Germany) Aline Bock
2011	(France) Aurélien Ducroz	(Austria) Mitch Tölderer	(Sweden) Janette Hargin	(France) Anne-Flore Marxer
2012	(Sweden) Reine Barkered	(France) Jonathan Charlet	(Sweden) Christine Hargin	(United States) Maria DeBari
2013	(United States) Drew Tabke	(United States) Ralph Backstrom	(Austria) Nadine Wallner	(France) Élodie Mouthon
2014	(France) Loïc Collomb-Patton	(Switzerland) Émilien Badoux	(Austria) Nadine Wallner	(United States) Shannan Yates
2015	(United States) George Rodney	(France) Jonathan Charlet	(Austria) Eva Walkner	(Switzerland) Estelle Balet
2016	(France) Loïc Collomb-Patton	(United States) Sammy Luebke	(Austria) Eva Walkner	(Switzerland) Estelle Balet
2017	(France) Léo Slemett	(United States) Sammy Luebke	(Austria) Lorraine Huber	(France) Marion Haerty
2018	(Sweden) Kristofer Turdell	(United States) Sammy Luebke	(Italy) Arianna Tricomi	(Austria) Manuela Mandl
2019	(Italy) Markus Eder	(France) Victor de Le Rue	(Italy) Arianna Tricomi	(France) Marion Haerty
2020	(United States) Isaac Freeland	(United States) Nils Mindnich	(Italy) Arianna Tricomi	(France) Marion Haerty
2021	(Sweden) Kristofer Turdell	(France) Victor de Le Rue	(Switzerland) Elisabeth Gerritzen	(France) Marion Haerty
2022	(Switzerland) Maxime Chabloz	(United States) Blake Moller	(New Zealand) Jess Hotter	(France) Tiphanie Perrotin
2023	(Austria) Valentin Rainer	(France) Ludovic Guillot-Diat	(Canada) Justine Dufour-Lapointe	(Canada) Katie Anderson
2024	(Germany) Max Hitzig	(France) Victor de Le Rue	(Norway) Hedvig Wessel	(Canada) Erin Sauve
2025	(Canada) Marcus Goguen	(France) Victor de Le Rue	(Canada) Justine Dufour-Lapointe	(France) Noémie Equy
2026	(New Zealand) Ben Richards	(France) Victor de Le Rue	(France) Lou Barin	(United States) Mia Jones

=== By nationality (2008-2026) ===
Nation	Championships
France	26
United States	14
Austria	8
Sweden	6
Switzerland	6
Canada	5
Italy	4
Norway	3
Germany	2
New Zealand	2

== See also ==
- Extreme skiing
