= Wildseeloderhaus =

Alpine hut in the Kitzbühel Alps in Austria

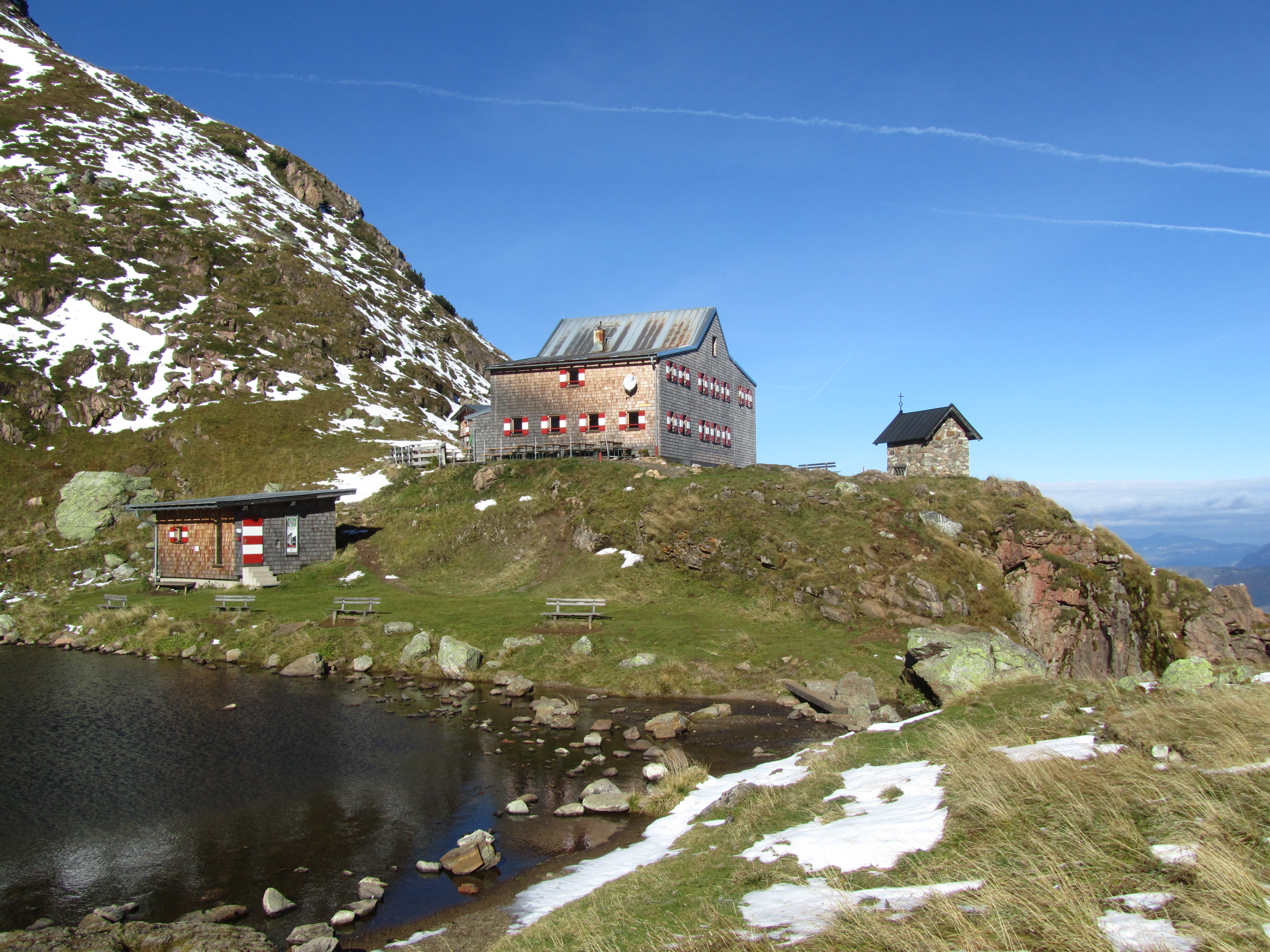
- Interactive map of the Wildseeloderhaus area

General information
- Location: below the Wildseeloder
- Coordinates: 47.4192056°N 12.543028°E
- Elevation: 1,854 m (6,083 ft)
- Year built: 1892
- Owner: OeAV Fieberbrunn Section

The Wildseeloderhaus is an Alpine hut owned by the Austrian Alpine Club (OeAV) that lies below the Wildseeloder mountain in the Kitzbühel Alps in Austria.

== Location ==
The hut lies at a height of 1,854 metres in a cirque hollow by a small mountain lake between the summits of Henne and Wildseeloder above the village of Fieberbrunn in the Pillerseetal valley. It is a base for numerous mountain hikes in the eastern Kitzbühel Alps. The house lies opposite the Loferer Steinberge range and overlooks its southern rock faces.

== History ==
The Wildseeloderhaus was built in 1891/1892 as a joint project by the Fieberbrunn Section of the OeAV and the Fieberbrunn Tourist Association. Since 1899 the Alpine Club has been the sole owner of the hut. In 1963, the ruined chapel was rebuilt and, in 1970, the hut itself was modified and extended. A further modification was carried out in 2008.

== Facilities ==
The hut has two double bedrooms, two four-bed rooms, a 12-man mattress room and a 16-man mattress room.

== Access ==
The Wildseeloder is the local mountain (Hausberg) of the town of Fieberbrunn which may be accessed:

- by train: with the ÖBB to Fieberbrunn
- by bus: between the villages in the Pillerseetal and Fieberbrunn.
- by car: to the car park by the Fieberbrunn Cable Car.

== Approaches ==
The normal approaches to the hut are:

- from Fieberbrunn in 3½-4 hours via Alpine Club Way (AV-Weg) No. 711
- from the valley station of the Fieberbrunn Cable Car (three hours)
- by cable car to the Lärchfilzkogel (1,650 m) and an hour’s walk from the cable car station.
- from the Gasthaus Lärchfilzhochalm in one hour, 45 minutes.
- from Hörndlingergraben / Gasthaus Pulvermacher Scherm (3½-4 hours)

== Hiking routes ==
The alpine hut has routes to the following nearby mountains:

- to the local Wildseeloder mountain (2,119 m), duration: 1 hour
- to the Henne (2,074 m), duration: 30 minutes
- Klettersteig to the Henne from the Hochhörndler Spitze top station, duration: 1 hour
- to the Mahdstein (2,063 m), duration: 2 hours
- to the Bischof (2,127 m), duration: 3 hours
- to the Gebra (2,054 m), duration: 3½ hours
- on the mountain trail (Höhenweg) to the Kitzbüheler Horn, duration: 8 hours
- Fieberbrunner Mountain Trail (Höhenweg), duration: 5 hours

== Crossings ==
- via the Hochwildalm Hut to the Bochumer Hut, 1,432 m, duration: seve–eight hours
- via the Alpine Club Way (AV-Weg) 711 to the Hochwildalm Hut, 1,557 m, duration: three–four hours.
- via the Blumenweg trail to the Hochhörndl Hut, 1,809 m, duration: one hour
