= Estelle Balet =

Swiss snowboarder

Estelle Candice Balet
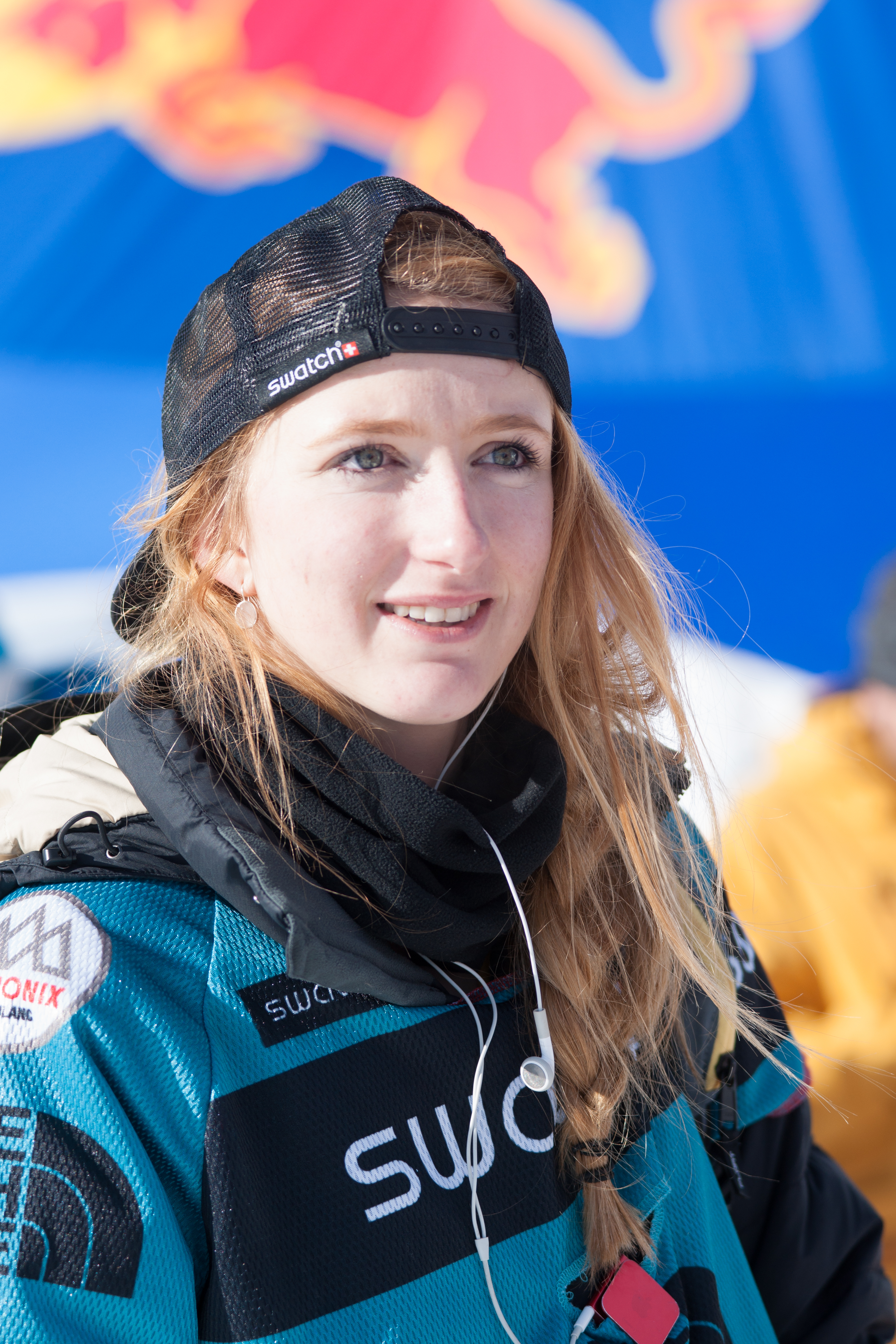
- Balet at the 2014 Freeride World Tour in Chamonix

Personal information
- Nationality: Swiss
- Born: 19 December 1994 Sion, Valais, Switzerland
- Died: 19 April 2016 (aged 21) Orsières, Valais, Switzerland
- Occupation: Snowboarder
- Years active: 2013–2016
- Height: 169 cm (5 ft 7 in)
- Website: estellebalet.com

Sport
- Country: Switzerland
- Sport: Snowboarding

Achievements and titles
- World finals: Two world titles

Estelle Balet (19 December 1994 – 19 April 2016) was a Swiss freeride snowboarder and two-time world champion in 2015 and 2016 at the Freeride World Tour. She died in an avalanche on 19 April 2016, at the age of 21.

== Early life ==
Estelle Balet was born in the village of Vercorin in Valais. She started skiing early in her childhood. At the age of ten she transitioned from skiing to snowboarding after a knee injury.

== Snowboarding career ==
At the age of 16, she met her future mentor Geraldine Fasnacht who gave her a fascination for free ride. She won the Dakine Junior Tour competing with the seniors. Starting in la Clusaz, she won her first 2* competitions, and obtained a wild card for a 3* competition, achieving 2nd place. On her first year as an active athlete, she won in Hochfuegen (Austria), Chandolin and Nendaz, as well as the European Freeride World qualifier. She entered the Freeride World Tour at the age of eighteen and three weeks, as the youngest athlete ever on this level. Balet specialized particularly in switch, frontside 180, frontside 360 and jib. In 2014, she got 4 podiums in four competitions and was freeride world vice-champion and was nominated as 2014 Rookie of the year by the Direction of Freeride World Tour. In 2015, after two victories in the World Tour in Andorra and Fieberbrunn, Balet became the youngest ever Freeride World Tour champion. She upheld her world title in 2016 after her victories in Andorra and in Verbier Xtreme. She was a part of the Swatch professional team.

== Death ==
On 19 April 2016, three weeks after having conquered her second consecutive freeride world title, Estelle Balet died in an avalanche while snowboarding in Orsières. She was filming a snowboard segment with her friend Geraldine Fasnacht for her own first film called Exploring the Known on Le Portalet in southwestern Switzerland. Despite swift action from emergency services and attendance from Air Glaciers, she died from her injuries.
