= Jess Hotter =

New Zealand extreme skier (born 1993)

Personal information
- Full name: Jessica Hotter
- Nationality: New Zealand
- Born: 16 July 1993 (age 32)
- Height: 154 cm (5 ft 1 in)
- Weight: 64 kg (141 lb)

Sport
- Country: New Zealand
- Sport: Big mountain skiing
Medal record
Women's Freeride Skiing
Representing New Zealand
FIS Freeride World Tour
Gold medal – first place	2022 Overall Champion	FWT
Gold medal – first place	2022 Ordino Arcalis	FWT
Gold medal – first place	2022 Fieberbrunn	FWT
Silver medal – second place	2022 Kicking Horse	FWT
Gold medal – first place	2020 Kicking Horse	FWT
FIS Freeride World Qualifier
Gold medal – first place	2022 North Face Frontier 4*	FWQ
Gold medal – first place	2021 Vertical Drop Freeride 3*	FWQ
Gold medal – first place	2019 North Face Frontier 4*	FWQ
Gold medal – first place	2019 Overall Champion	FWQ
Gold medal – first place	2019 Nendaz Freeride 4*	FWQ
Gold medal – first place	2019 Silvretta-Montafon 4*	FWQ
Gold medal – first place	2018 North Face Frontier 4*	FWQ
Silver medal – second place	2017 North Face Frontier 4*	FWQ
Silver medal – second place	2017 North Face Frontier 2*	FWQ
Gold medal – first place	2017 Mt Olympus Freeride Open 2*	FWQ
Bronze medal – third place	2017 North Face Frontier 4*	FWQ
- Updated on 13 July 2023

Jess Hotter (born 16 July 1993) is a New Zealand big mountain skier who won the women's skiing Freeride World Tour title in 2022.

Hotter was crowned with the overall Freeride World Tour title in 2022 in Verbier, Switzerland after a successful season campaign which had her atop the podium in both Ordino-Arcalis and Fieberbrunn and in second place at Kicking Horse Resort.

== Early life ==
Hotter was born in New Plymouth, New Zealand.She spent most of her childhood living in Ohakune, where she was educated at Ruapehu College, finishing in 2011.
