= Wildseeloder =

Mountain in Tyrol, Austria

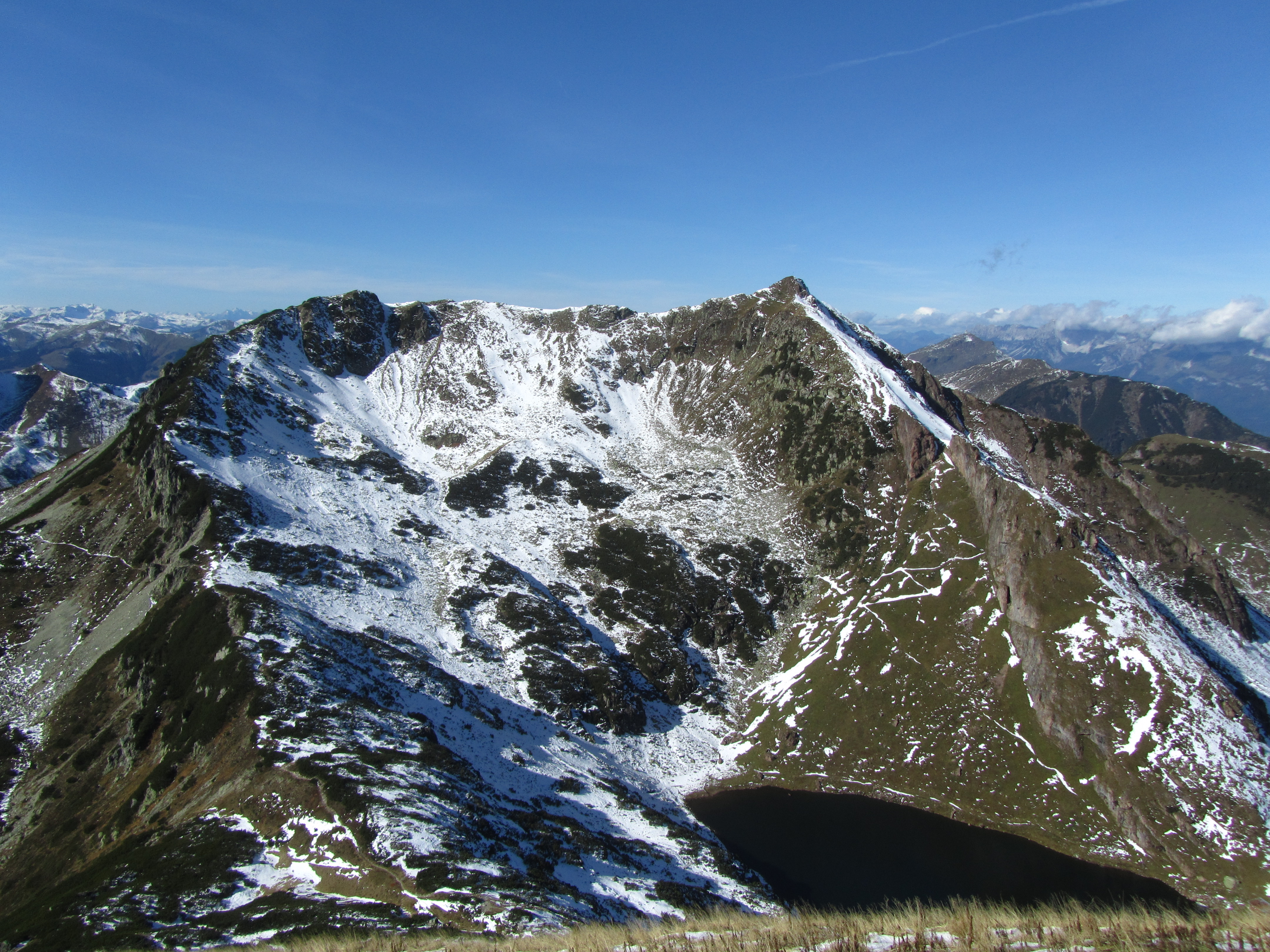
- The Wildseeloder with the Wildsee lake and the Wildseeloderhaus

Highest point
- Elevation: 2,119 m (AA) (6,952 ft)
- Coordinates: 47°N 12°E

Geography
- Location within Austria
- Location: Tyrol, Austria
- Parent range: Kitzbühel Alps

The Wildseeloder is a 2,119-metre-high (6,952 ft) mountain in the eastern Kitzbühel Alps in Tyrol, Austria. The valley base for the Wildseeloder is Fieberbrunn in the Pillersee valley. On its northern slopes is a ski area. The summit, which has no lifts up to it, is a popular ski touring destination in winter. West of the Wildseeloder is a lake, the Wildsee, in a cirque hollow. The Wildseeloderhaus stands on its shore. The easiest ascent to the Wildseeloder runs from Fieberbrunn to the north, over the Lärchfilzkogel past the Wildseeloderhaus.

== Gallery ==
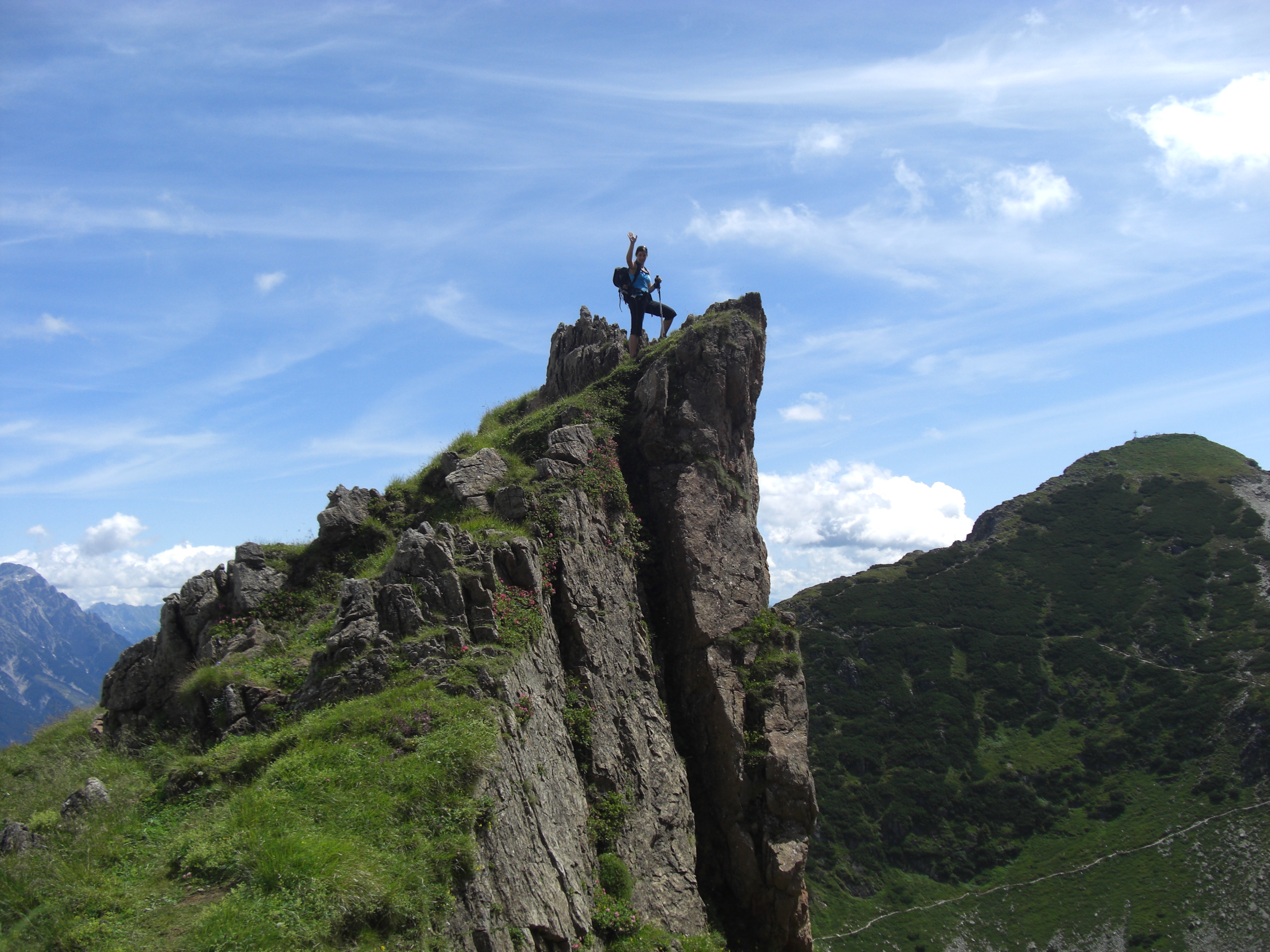
Crag on the way to the Wildseeloder

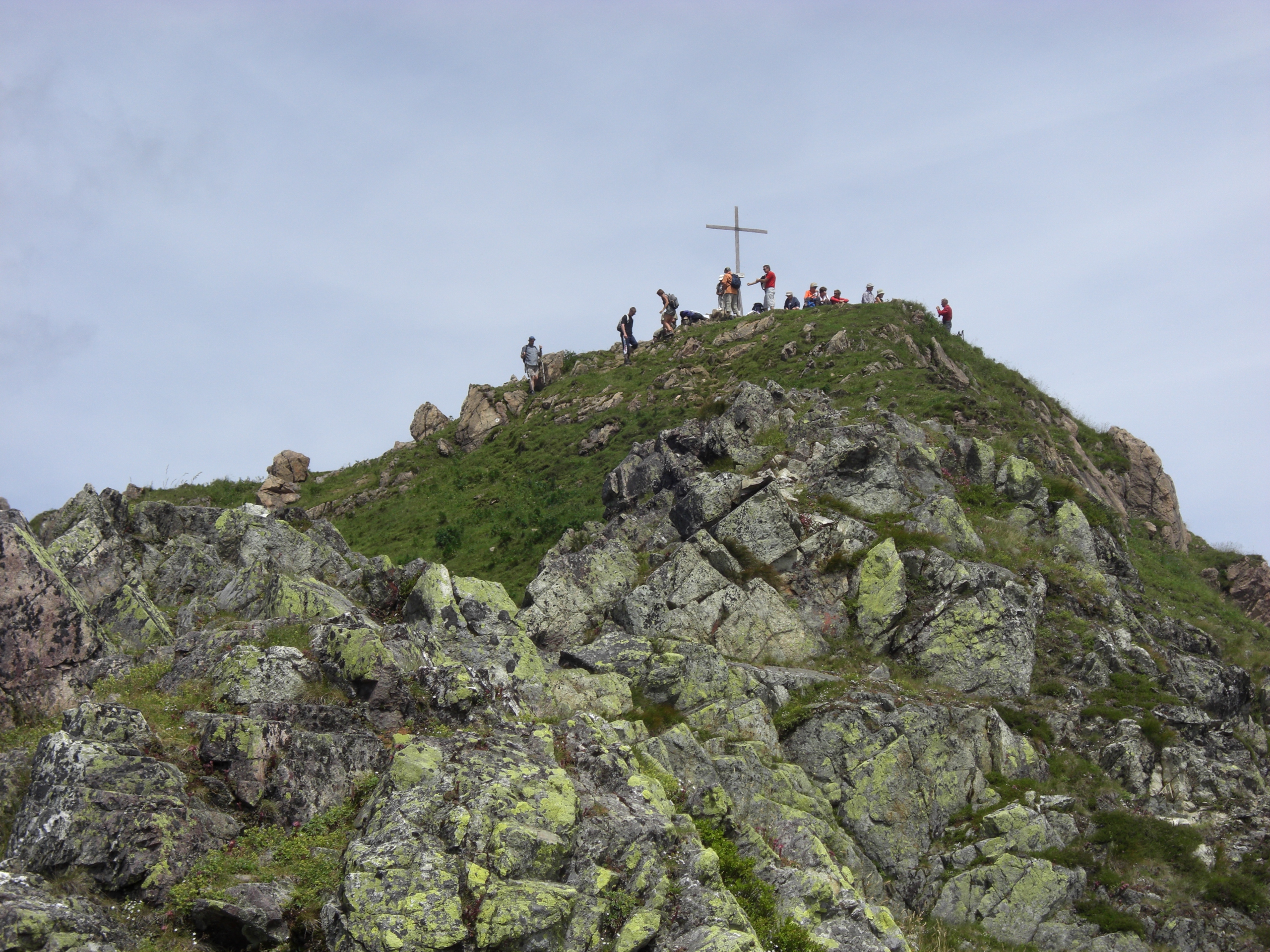
Summit of the Wildseeloder

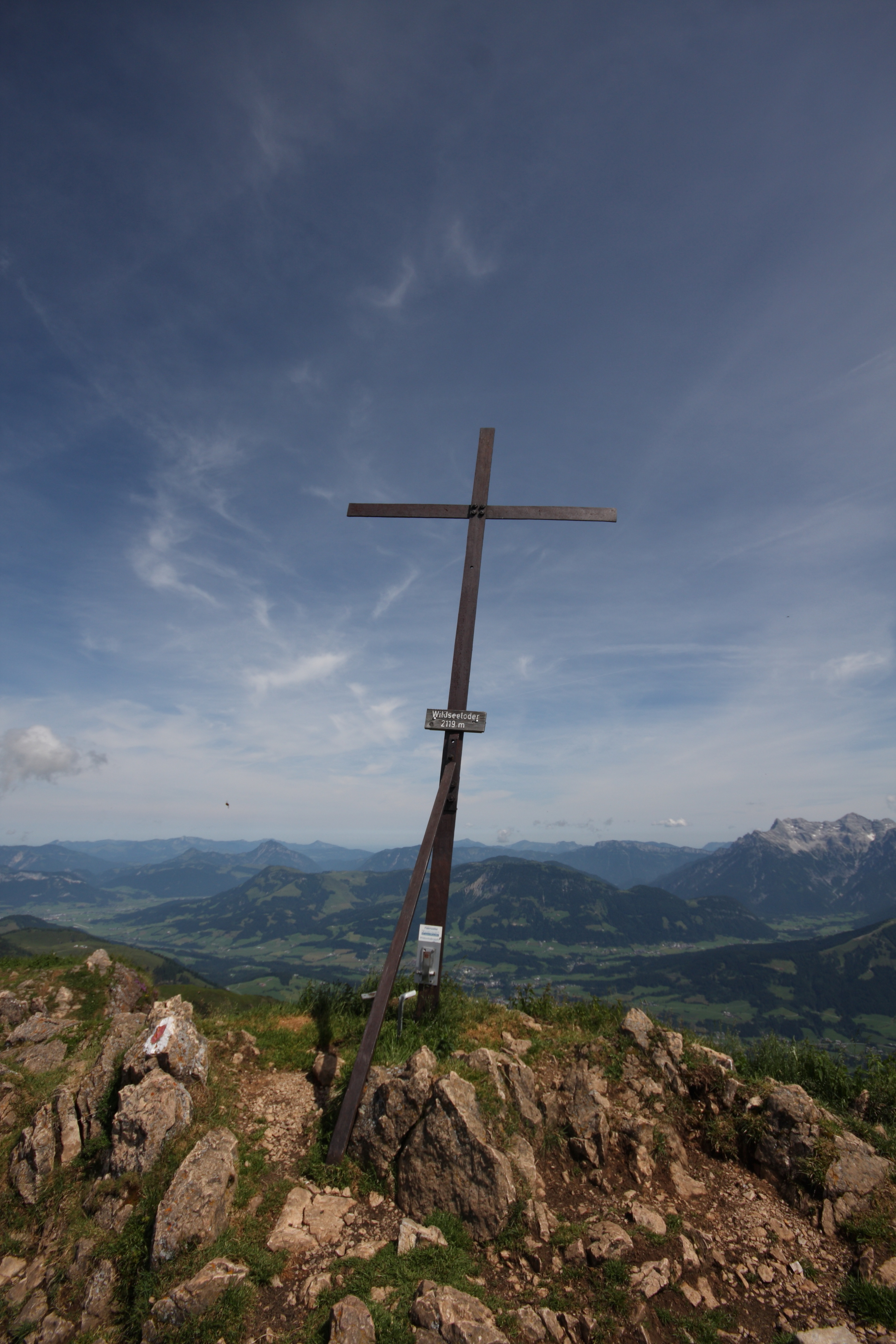
Cross on the summit

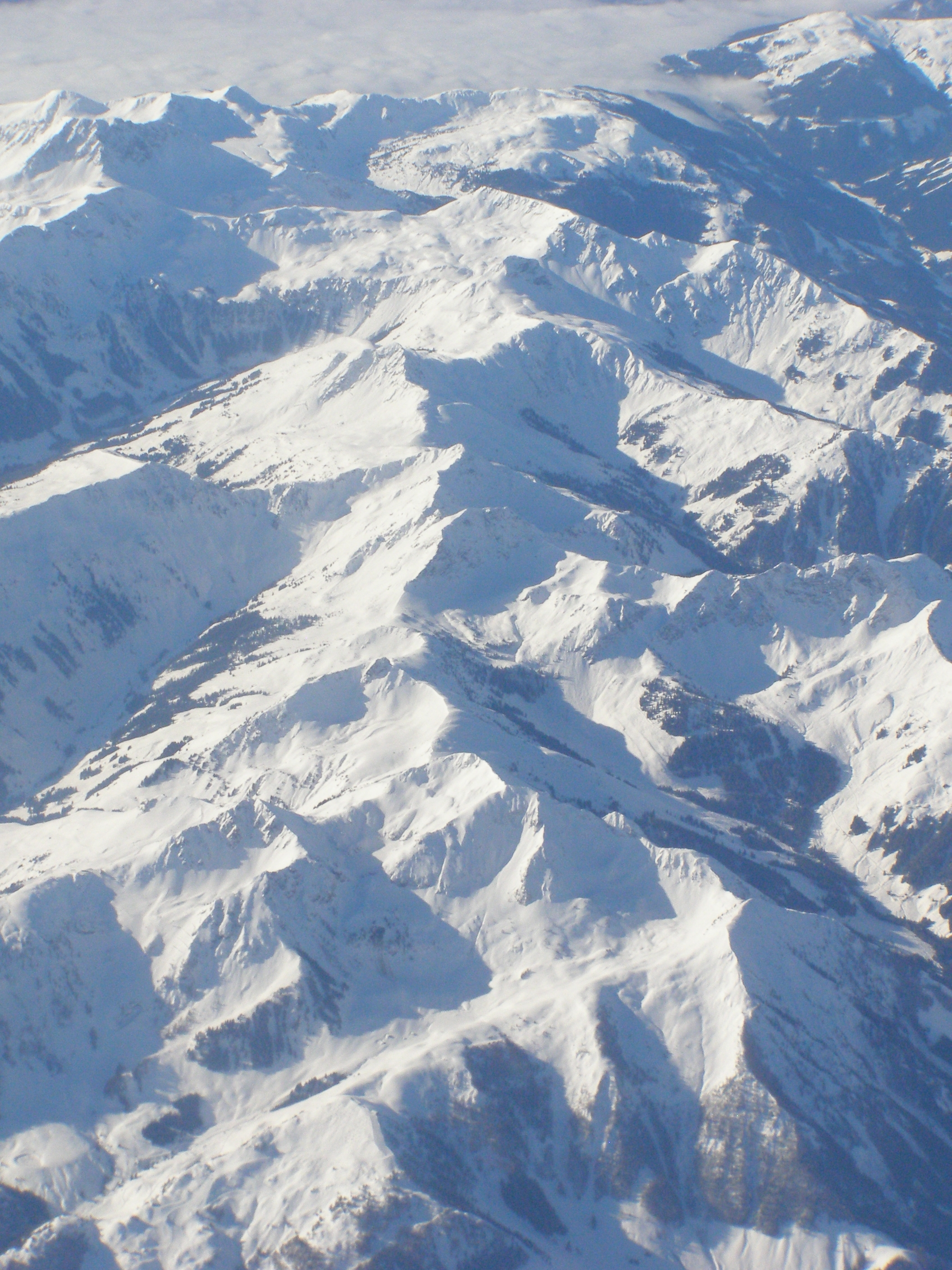
aerial view
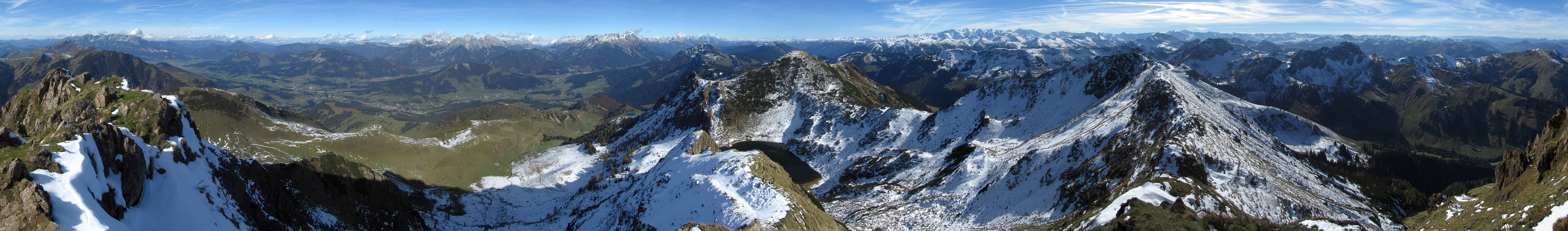
Panoramic view from the summit
