= Aline Bock =

German freeride snowboarder (born 1982)

Aline Bock (born 23 July 1982 in Gießen) is a German freeride snowboarder. She did freestyle halfpipe competitions first, but changed to slopestyle shortly after. Few years later she focused mainly on big mountain riding. Since 2009, she has competed in the Freeride World Tour Series. In 2009, she became the Vice World Champion of freeride snowboard and in 2010 she won the Freeride World Championship.
