= Reine Barkered =

Swedish freeride skier

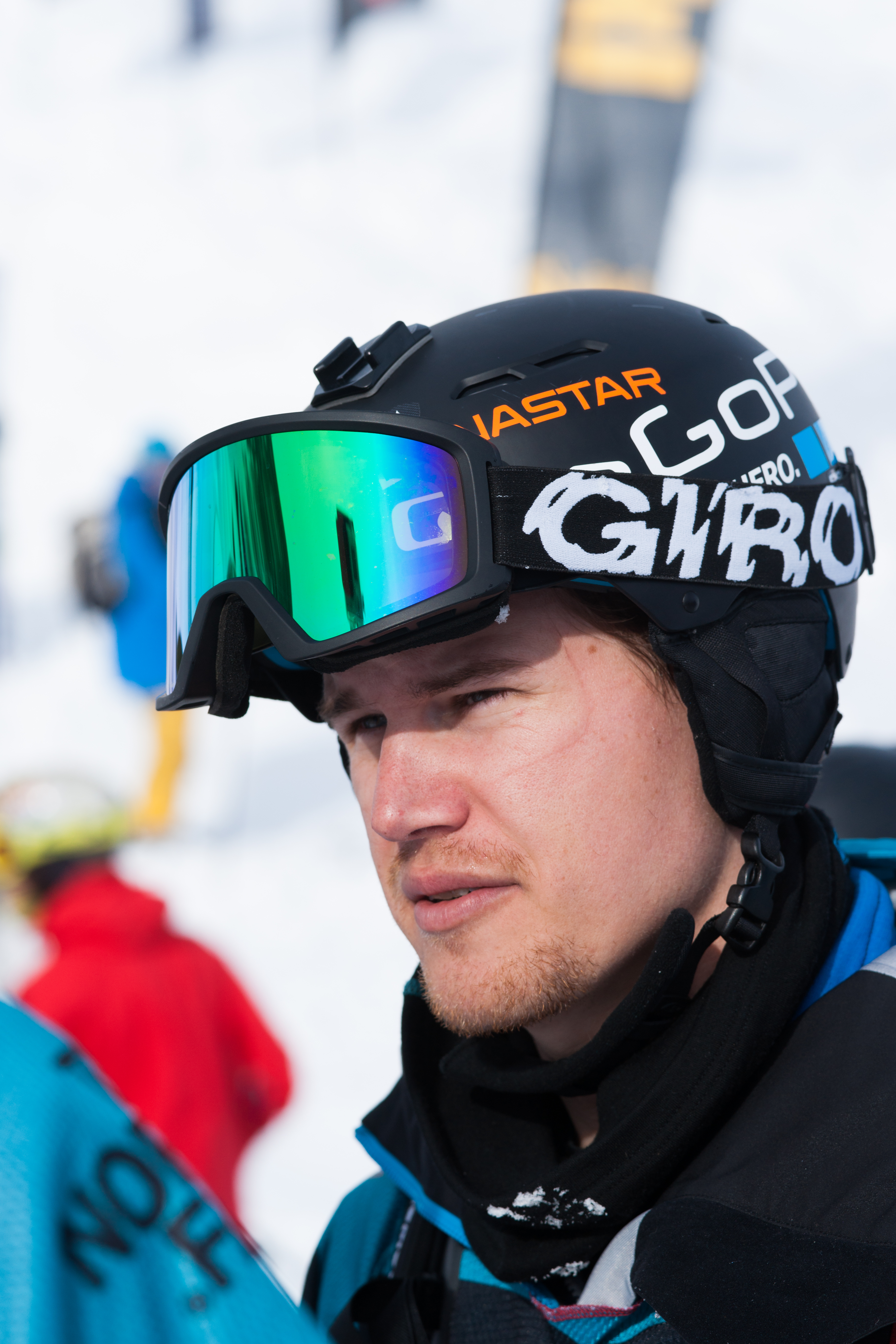
Reine Barkered during Freeride World Tour Chamonix

Reine Barkered (born 1982) is a big mountain skier from Duved, Sweden.

Barkered competed as an alpine ski racer before switching focus to freeride skiing in 2001. He did his first freeride competition, the Swedish big mountain championship in 2004, an event he won in 2006 also marking the last Swedish championship in the sport to date. He has competed in the Scandinavian big mountain championship (the world's oldest running freeride competition) since 2004.

In 2006 Barkered started competing on international level and in 2008 he qualified to the newly started Freeride World Tour. He ended up second overall in he's first year. He later earned the nickname 'the mayor of stomptown' and have a cliff named after him on Bec des Rosses, the mountain for the finals of the Freeride World Tour.

In 2012 Barkered won the overall Freeride World Tour claiming the world champion title and claimed the Transition Magazine award "Best Big Mountain Skier".

In 2017 he won his third Xtreme Verbier putting him in a group of handful of riders taking a win in this prestigious competition three times which, according to industry rumor give a lifetime wild card to the event.

In 2016 he married Freeride World Tour athlete Jackie Paaso.

== Freeride World Tour results ==
=== Season standings ===
Season	Age	Overall
2009	27	2
2010	28	7
2011	29	4
2012	30	1
2013	31	2
2014	32	4
2015	33	3
2016	34	6
2017	35	2
2018	36	11
2019	37	13

== Race top results ==
- 1st Swedish big mountain Championship Funäsdalen 2006
- 2nd Scandinavian big mountain championship Riksgränsen 2006
- 2nd Freeride World Tour qualifier Montafon 2008
- 1st Snowfever qualification Fieberbrunn 2008
- 1st Lofoten Freeride 2008
- 1st Hemsedal Freeride 2008
- 1st King of the mountain Norway freeride cup 2008
- 1st Freeride World Tour Squaw valley 2009
- 2nd Freeride World Tour Xtreme Verbier 2009
- 3rd Freeride World Tour Squaw Valley 2010
- 3rd Freeride World Tour Xtreme du Chamonix 2011
- 2nd Freeride World Tour Big mountain Fieberbrunn 2011
- 4th Freeride World Tour Xtreme Verbier 2011
- 3rd Scandinavian Big mountain championship Riksgränsen 2011
- 2nd FWT Freeride du Chamonix 12
- 3rd FWT Fieberbrunn 12
- 1st FWT Xtreme Verbier 12
- 1st Overall Freeride World tour Champion 2012
- 2nd Scandinavian Big mountain championship 2012
- 3rd Freeride World Tour Courmayeur-Mont-Blanc 2013
- 3rd Freeride World Tour Fieberbrunn Pillerseetal 2013
- 2nd FWT Verbier Xtreme 2013
- 2nd Overall Freeride World tour 2013
- 2nd Scandinavian Big mountain championship Riksgränsen 2013
- 1st FWT Xtreme Verbier 2014
- 2nd Scandinavian Big mountain championship Riksgränsen 2014
- 2nd Freeride World Tour Chamonix 2015
- 3rd Freeride World Tour Andorra 2015
- 2nd Freeride World Tour Xtreme Verbier 2015
- 3rd Overall Freeride World Tour 2015
- 3rd Freeride World Tour Fieberbrunn 2017
- 1st FWT Xtreme Verbier 2017
- 2nd Overall Freeride World Tour 2017
- 4th Xtreme Verbier 2019
- 3rd FWT Hakuba Japan 2020

== Filmography ==
- 2009 RAD Films - Double UP
- 2010 Second Hands - Second best friends
- 2017 Winning run Xtreme Verbier
