= 2016 sports deaths =

Sportspeople who died in 2016

== January ==
- January 7 - John Johnson, American basketball player
- January 11 - Monte Irvin, American baseball player
- January 23 - Bobby Wanzer, American basketball player and coach
- January 27 - Augusto Giomo, Italian basketball player

== February ==
- February 4 - Dave Mirra, American BMX rider and racecar driver
- February 24 - Eddie Einhorn, American basketball television and radio executive
- February 26 - Andy Bathgate, Canadian ice hockey player

== March ==
- March 3 - Sarah Tait, Australian rower
- March 7 - Bobby Johns, American racecar driver
- March 9 - Clyde Lovellette, basketball player
- March 23 - Joe Garagiola, American baseball player and announcer
- March 24 - Johan Cruyff, Dutch football player and coach
- March 27 - Antoine Demoitié, Belgian cyclist
- March 28 - Daan Myngheer, Belgian cyclist

== April ==
- April 7 - Carlo Monti, Italian athlete
- April 13 - Nera White, American basketball player
- April 19 - Estelle Balet, Swiss snowboarder
- April 23 - Attila Ferjáncz, Hungarian racecar driver
- April 29 - Don White, American racecar driver

== May ==
- May 6 - Patrick Ekeng, Cameroonian football player
- May 14 - Christy O'Connor Snr, Irish golfer

== June ==
- June 3 - Muhammad Ali, American boxer
- June 3 - Sten Lundin, Swedish motorcycle rider
- June 3 - Luis Salom, Spanish motorcycle rider
- June 10 - Gordie Howe, Canadian ice hockey player
- June 11 - Rudi Altig, German cyclist
- June 15 - Hiroshi Minatoya, Japanese judoka
- June 22 - Roberto Lovera, Uruguayan basketball player
- June 28 - Pat Summitt, American basketball player and coach
- June 28 - Buddy Ryan, NFL coach
- June 29 - Jan Hettema, South African cyclist and racecar driver

== July ==
- July 9 - Fritzi Schwingl, Austrian canoeist
- July 9 - Bill Guilfoile, American baseball executive
- July 16 - Nate Thurmond, American basketball player

== August ==
- August 3 - Chris Amon, New Zealand racecar driver
- August 6 - Midget Farrelly, Australian surfer
- August 7 - Bryan Clauson, American racecar driver
- August 9 - Bill Alsup, American racecar driver
- August 14 - Yasumitsu Toyoda, Japanese baseball player
- August 15 - Stefan Henze, German canoeist and coach
- August 16 - João Havelange, Brazilian football executive
- August 24 – Nina Yeryomina, Russian basketball player
- August 26 - Anton Pronk, Dutch football player
- August 28 - Lennart Häggroth, Swedish ice hockey player

== September ==
- September 7 - Bobby Chacon, American boxer
- September 8 - Hannes Arch, Austrian air racer
- September 17 - Bahman Golbarnezhad, Iranian para-cyclist
- September 23 - Frances Dafoe, Canadian figure skater
- September 24 - Mel Charles, Welsh football player
- September 25 - Arnold Palmer, American golfer
- September 25 - José Fernández, Cuban-American baseball player
- September 30 - Mike Towell, Scottish boxer

== November ==
- November 1 - Sverre Andersen, Norwegian footballer
- November 28 - Chapecoense tragedy (over 60 players, executives and journalists)

== December ==
- December 2 - Sammy Lee, American diver
- December 5 - Marcel Renaud, French kayaker
- December 7 - Paul Bert Elvstrøm, Danish yachter
- December 23 - Miruts Yifter, Ethiopian runner
- December 29 - Néstor Gonçalves, Uruguayan football player and coach
