= Lauchsee =

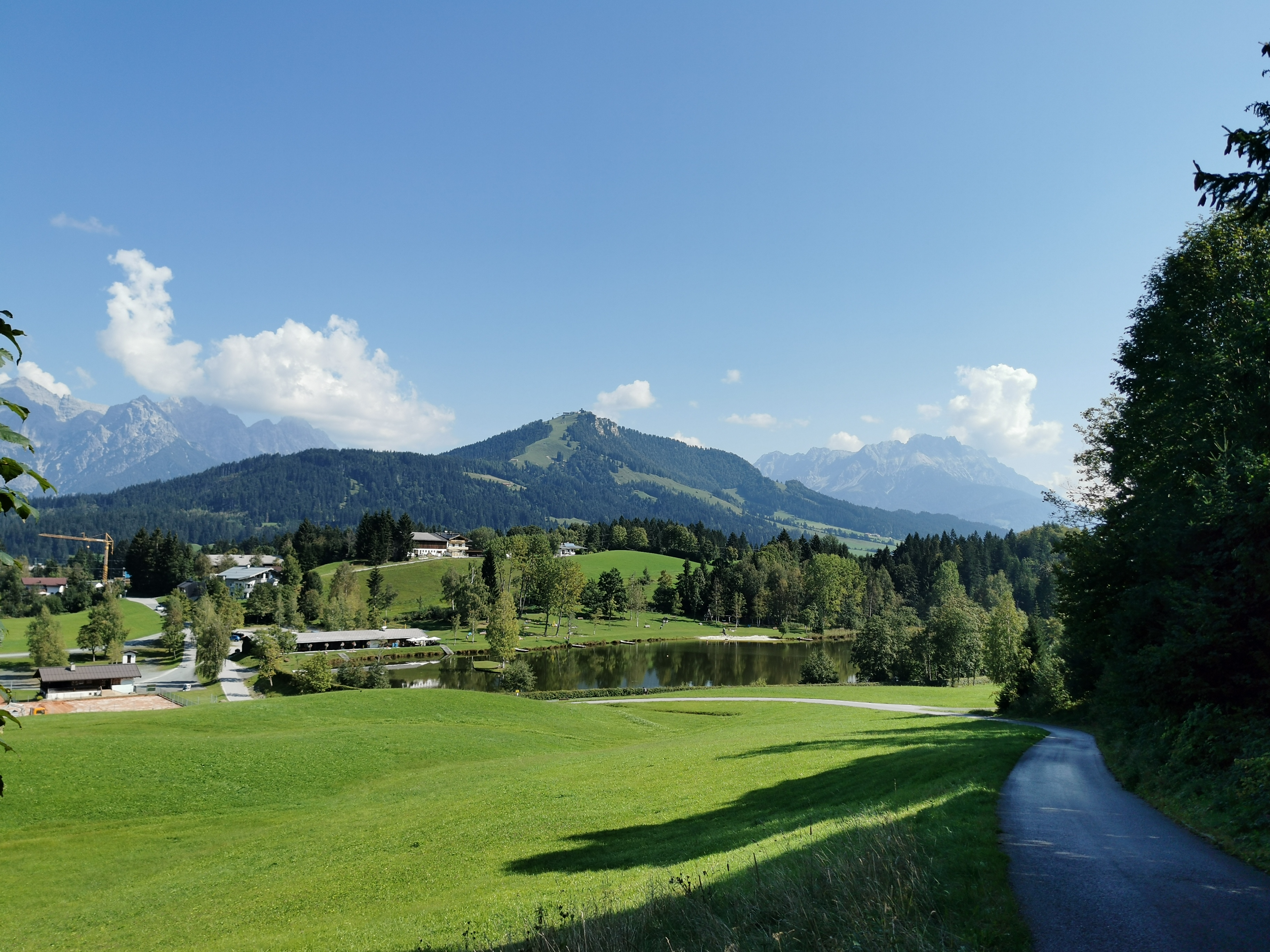
- The Lauchsee seen from southwest

- Location within Tyrol, Austria
- Location: Tyrol, Austria
- Coordinates: 47°28′15″N 12°32′04″E
- Max. length: 0.260 km (0.162 mi)
- Max. width: 0.120 km (0.075 mi)
- Surface area: 0.023 km^{2} (0.0089 sq mi)
- Max. depth: 4.3 m (14 ft)
- Surface elevation: 859 m (2,818 ft)

The Lauchsee is a large moor lake, 2.3 hectares in area, in the Tyrolean district of Kitzbühel. It lies on the territory of the municipality of Fieberbrunn above the Pletzerbach at an elevation of 859 m above sea level (AA). The lake has two small islands and its maximum depth is 4.3 metres. There is a swimming baths on the Lauchsee called the Moorbad Lauchsee.
