= Schloss Rosenegg =

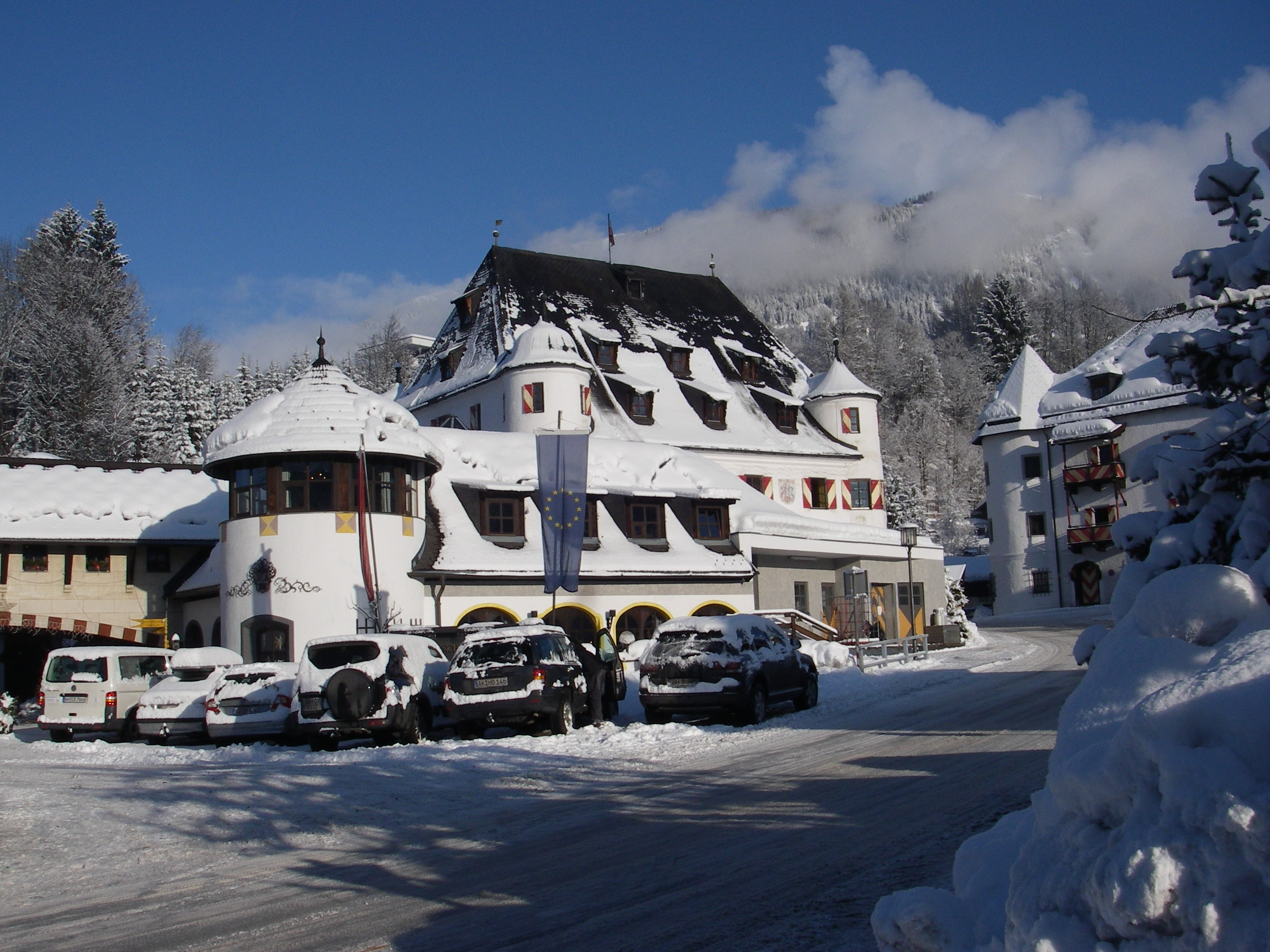
- The building in January 2008
- Interactive map of the Schloss Rosenegg area

General information
- Type: Hotel
- Location: Roseneggstrasse 58, Fieberbrunn, Austria
- Coordinates: 47.4876°N 12.5320°E
- Construction started: 1187

Website
- www.schlosshotel-rosenegg.at

Schloss Rosenegg is a schloss (castle) in Rosenegg, Fieberbrunn, Austria. It was built by Baron Rosenberg in 1187 and takes its name from the Rosenberg family, which governed the surrounding area from 1534 to 1872. Since 1938, it has been operated as a hotel, now rated at four stars.

It is said that Napoleon stayed at the castle in 1809, after the battle of Pass Stub.

A room in the building, the Gerichtstube, or courtroom, was used for trials, as the family held the right of judgement in the area.

A tunnel links the castle to a more modern extension.
