= Henrik Windstedt =

Swedish alpine skier (born 1983)

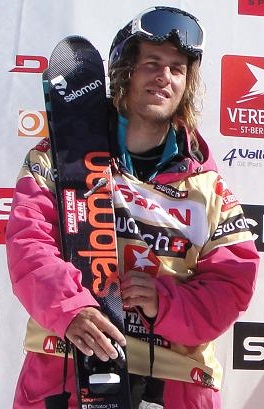

Medal record

Men's freestyle skiing

Representing Sweden

Freeride World Tour
Gold medal – first place	2008 Freeride World Champion	Men's ski

Per Henrik Peter Windstedt (born 8 September 1983) is a Swedish big mountain skier who has excelled at many aspects of skiing. He was one of Sweden's top moguls competitors as a junior, and has made big air and superpipe podiums. He won the 2008 Freeride World Tour.

== Career ==
Born and raised in the ski resort of Åre, Sweden, Windstedt started skiing regularly at an early age, coached by his father Peter, a high-level ski instructor. Windstedt made the National Mogul Team in 1999. He won the Junior World Mogul Championships in 2002 and competed in alpine ski racing for 11 seasons. He won the 2005 Men's Moguls FIS event at Winter Park, USA and it would be in freestyle and freeskiing he would make his biggest impact.

At age 16, he won King of the Hill in Riksgränsen, Sweden. In 1998, aged 17, he entered his first Big Air event and in 2000 won a Red Bull Big Air in Åre. He finished 5th in superpipe at Winter X-Games in 2003, and placed 2nd behind TJ Schiller in the slopestyle at the US Open in Vail, Colorado in 2004. Windstedt won the Scandinavian Big Mountain Championships seven times 2001–2011 and was crowned Freeride World Champion in 2008.

Following his win of the Freeride World Tour in 2008 Windstedt moved from Åre to the Principality of Monaco, to the same apartment building as several other Swedes who are alpine ski racers, and moved in two doors down from Jon Olsson, a fellow freeskiing Swede.

== Wins ==
- 2000 Red Bull Big Air – Åre
- 2001 Scandinavian Big Mountain Championships
- 2002 Junior World Mogul Championships
- 2002 Scandinavian Big Mountain Championships
- 2003 Scandinavian Big Mountain Championships
- 2005 Men's Moguls, FIS, Winter Park (USA)
- 2005 Scandinavian Big Mountain Championships
- 2007 Scandinavian Big Mountain Championships
- 2008 Scandinavian Big Mountain Championships
- 2008 Freeride World Tour
- 2011 Scandinavian Big Mountain Championships
