= Baqueira-Beret =

Ski resort

- Location within Spain Location within Catalonia Location within Pyrenees
- Location: Aran Valley and Àneu Valley Pyrenees, Spain
- Nearest major city: Lleida
- Coordinates: 42°41′57″N 0°56′48″E
- Top elevation: 2,610 metres (8,560 ft)
- Base elevation: 1,500 metres (4,900 ft)
- Skiable area: 171 kilometres (106 mi)
- Trails: 99 + 3 itineraries
- Lift system: 1 gondola lifts, 20 chair lifts, 7 ski tows
- Website: http://www.baqueira.es

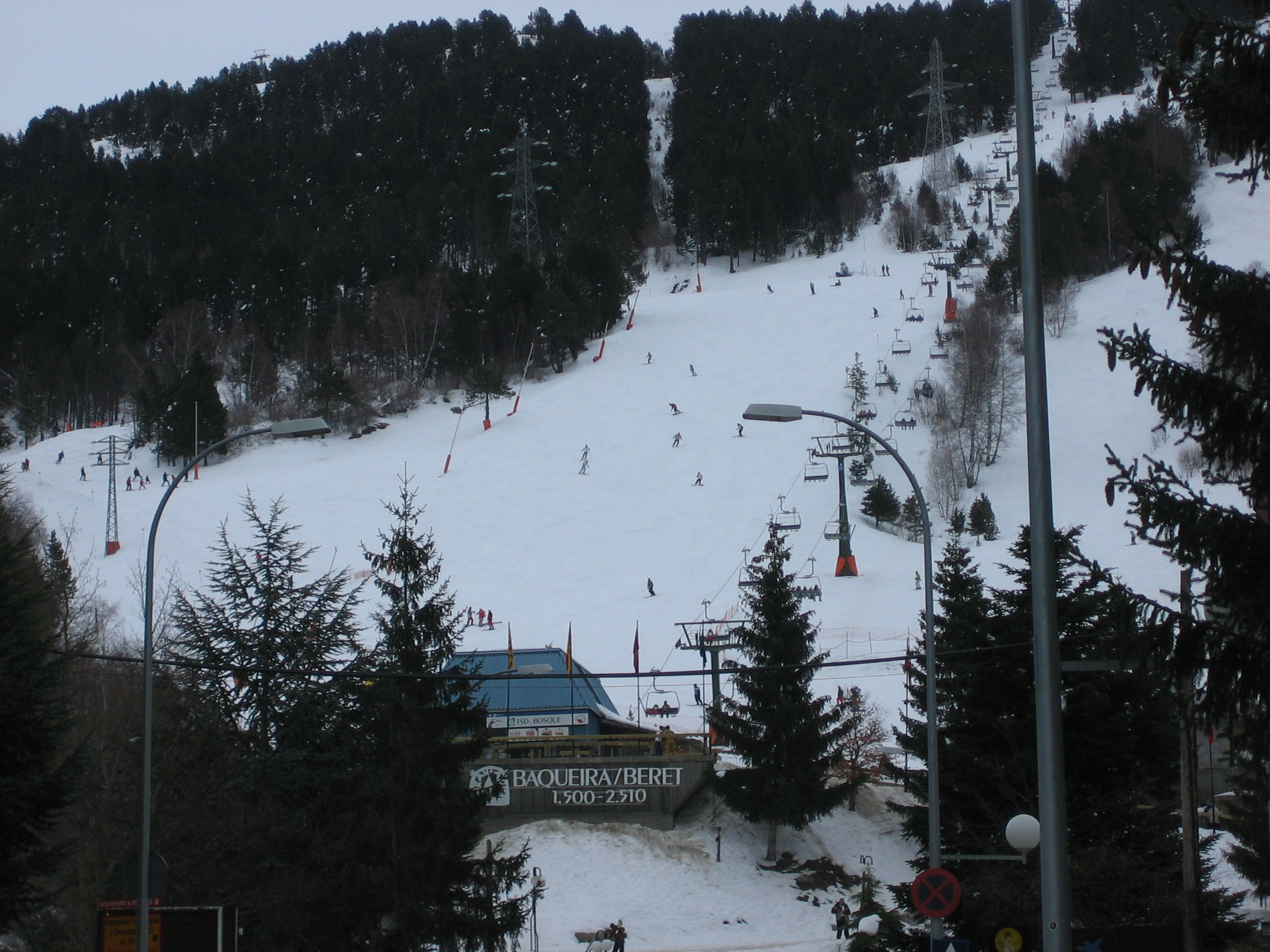
Bosque chairlift

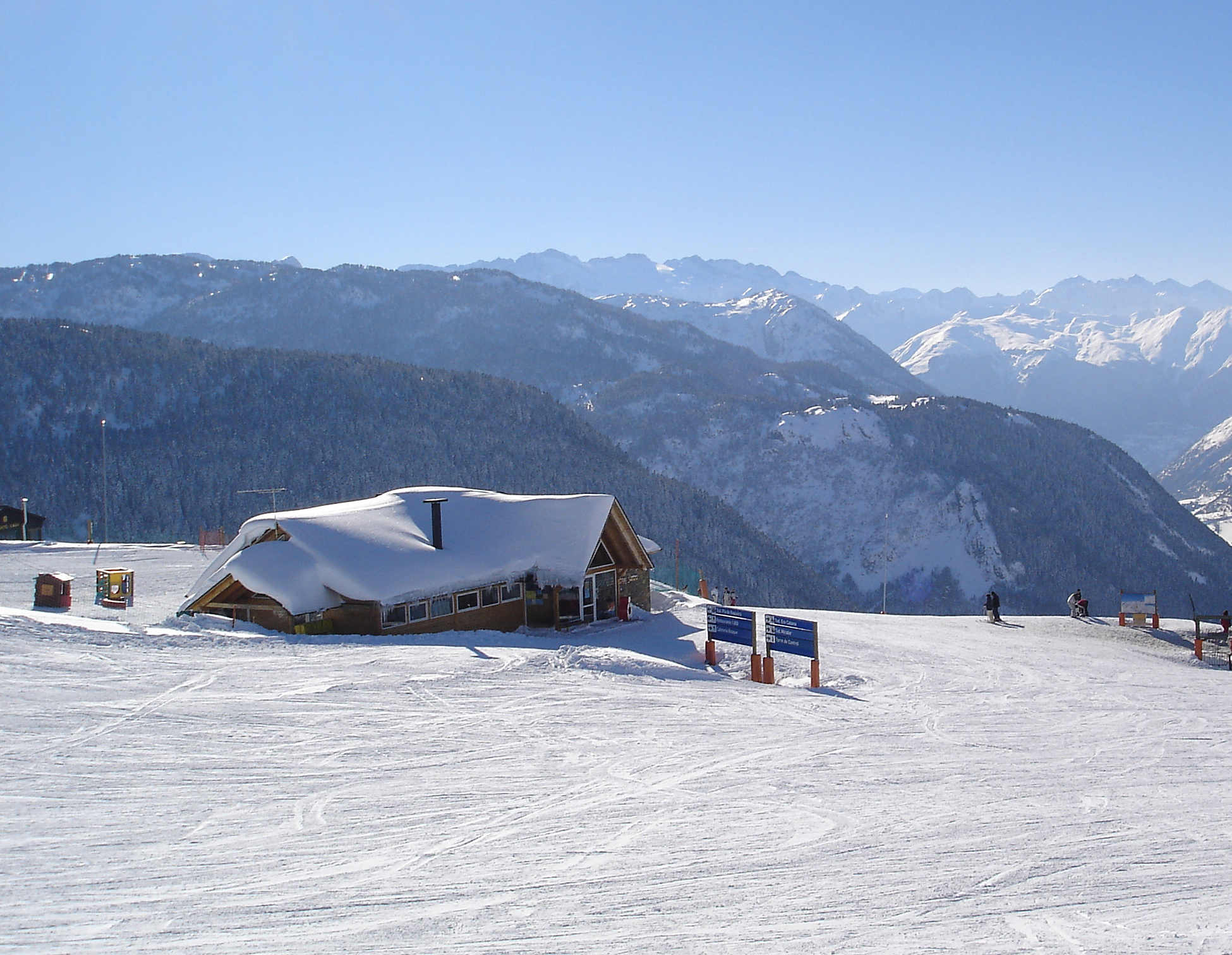
Baqueira 1800

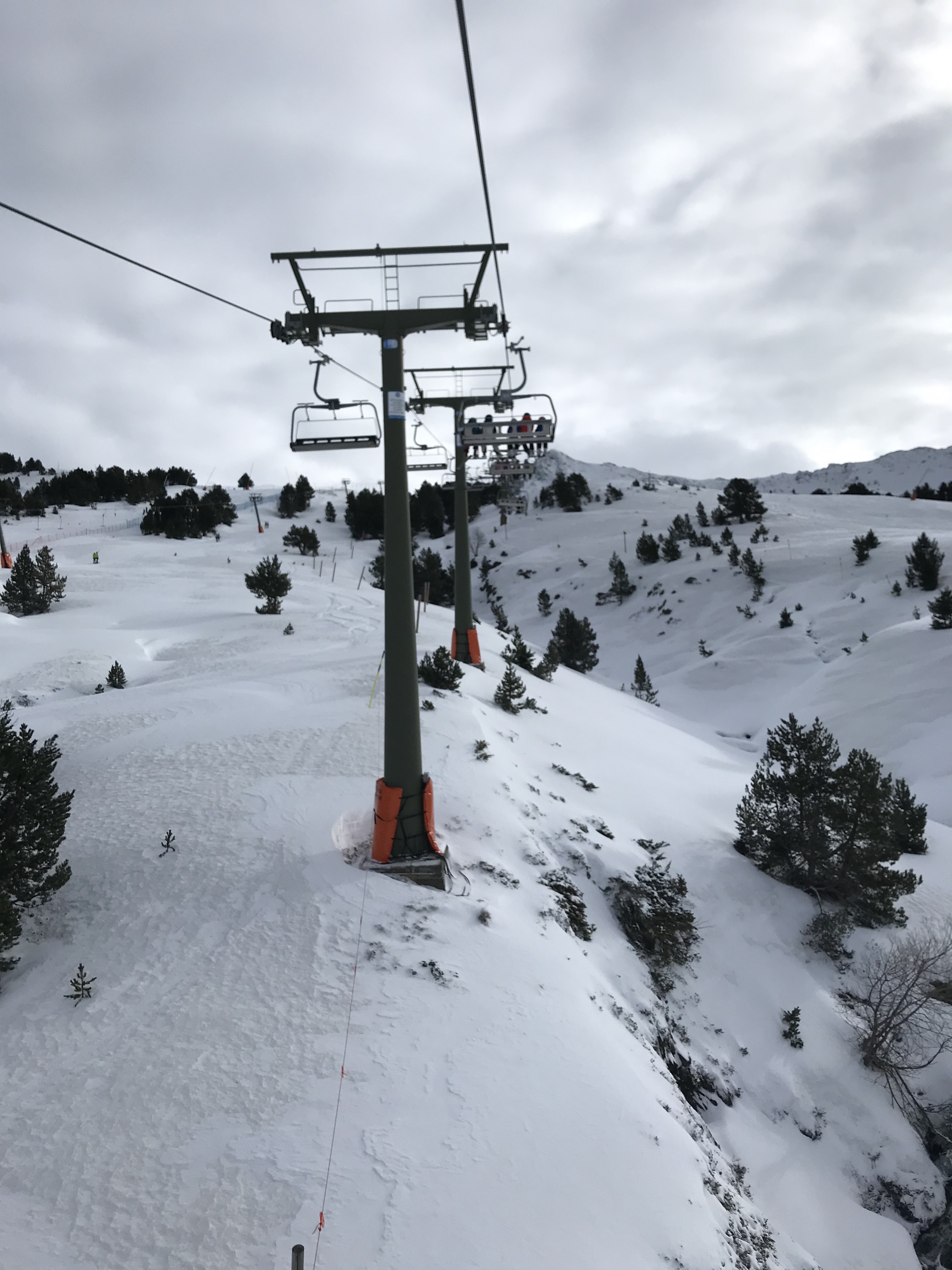
Dera Reina chairlift

Baqueira-Beret is a ski resort located in the heart of the Pyrenees, in the Aran and Àneu Valleys in Lleida, Catalonia, Spain, with the nearest airport located in Toulouse, France, approximately two hours' drive by automobile. The ski area extends from 1,500 to 2,610 metres (4,920 to 8,560 ft) in elevation, and due to its reliable snow elevation, the typical ski season starts in November and goes to late April. Baqueira is the largest and most visited winter resort in Spain. Popular amongst the royal family and the affluent Spanish and French, The Telegraph asks if Baqueira could be "the world's finest ski resort?".

== Resort ==
Baqueira-Beret is the largest and most visited winter resort in Spain, with 161 kilometres (100 mi) of marked pistes, 7 kilometres (4 mi) of marked off-piste, and 7 kilometres (4 mi) of cross-country ski and 2,166 hectares (5,350 acres) of ski area. It is located in the highest part of the Aran Valley (Naut Aran), and Pallars Sobirà (Valls d'Àneu). It has long and wide ski runs, some through trees. It is divided into three different zones, Baqueira, Beret and Bonaigua. Due to its westerly aspect and position on the northern side of the Pyrenees, and consequent Atlantic climate, the resort of Baqueira-Beret has a good snow record throughout the winter. In addition, there is more than 1,000 metres (3,300 ft) of vertical drop and an extensive skiable zone.

Much of the region of the Aran Valley and Àneu Valley is made up of over 50 small rural populations, each one with stone and wood houses and ancient Romanesque churches. The resort was founded 60 years ago on the initiative of the local authorities in the Aran Valley. A group of people commanded by Jorge Jordana Pozas, Jesús Serra Santamans and Luis Arias (after whom a piste was named after he died in a dramatic accident) founded the ski resort in the municipality of Naut Aran due to the good snow conditions found there.

== Lifts ==
Almost all of the resort's 35 lifts are modern and of high capacity, and consist of:

- 1 gondola lift.
- 20 chair lifts of which: 3 six seaters, 6 four seaters, 7 three seaters and 4 two seaters.
- 7 conveyor belts and 7 ski lifts.

== Pistes ==
The resort offers 99 pistes of different difficulties:

- 6 beginners.
- 40 easy.
- 37 intermediate.
- 15 expert.

== Services ==
The ski resort offers a wide range of services: a ski school, equipment rentals, restaurants and cafeterias on the slopes, medical services, etc. There are also hotels and apartments as well as ice skating, heated swimming pool, and shops. There are also numerous restaurants and bars for apre skiing activities.

The main activities are skiing and snowboarding. There are also other activities available such as hiking, rafting, kayaking and climbing. Museums and exhibitions are also available in the villages around the resort. Other activities that can be carried out in Baqueira are fishing and hunting, although they are both regulated.
