= Freeriding (winter sport) =

Style of snowboarding or skiing

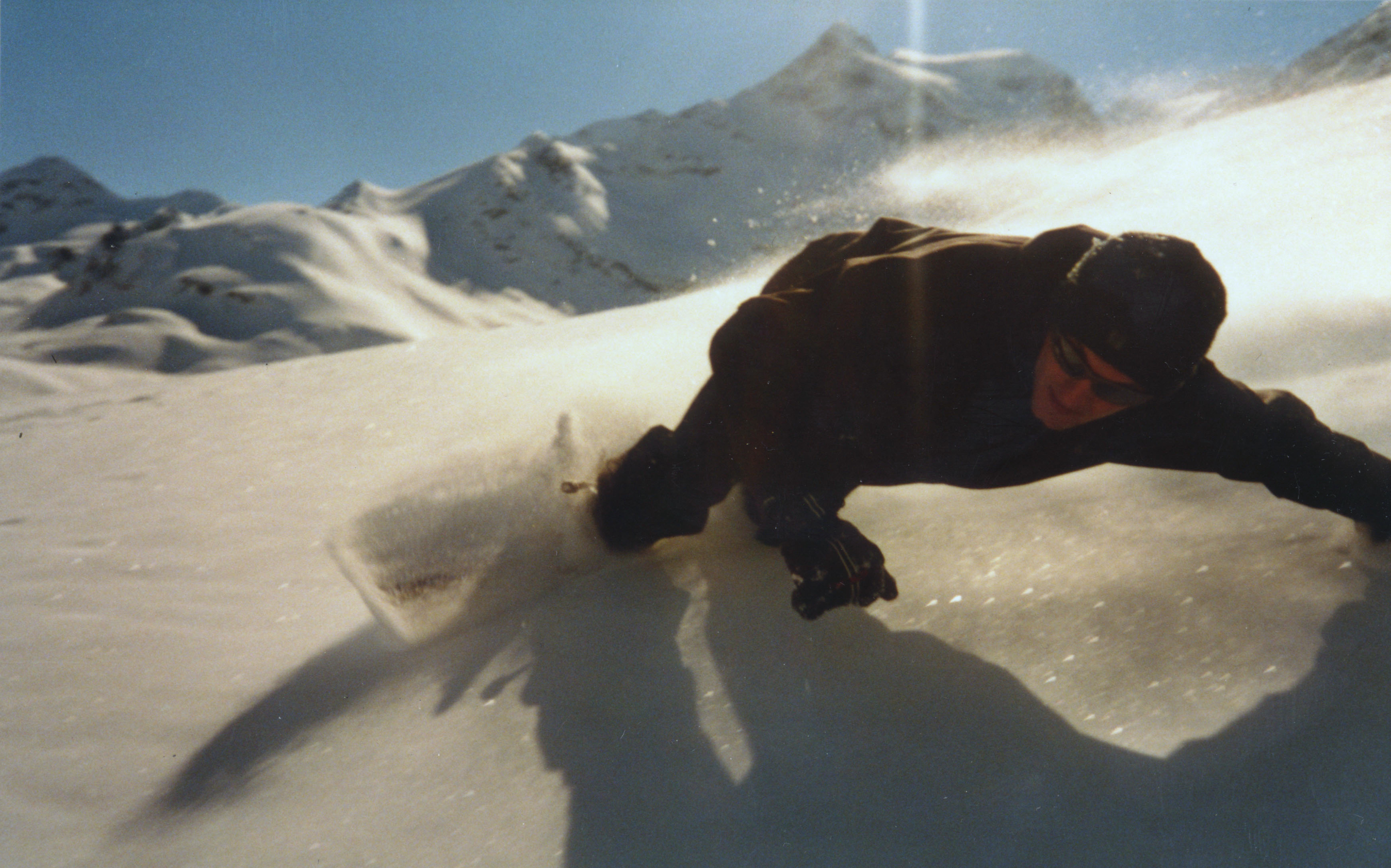
Freeriding in deep snow in natural terrain is very popular amongst snowboarders, whereby the required techniques are easier to learn in comparison to off-piste skiing.

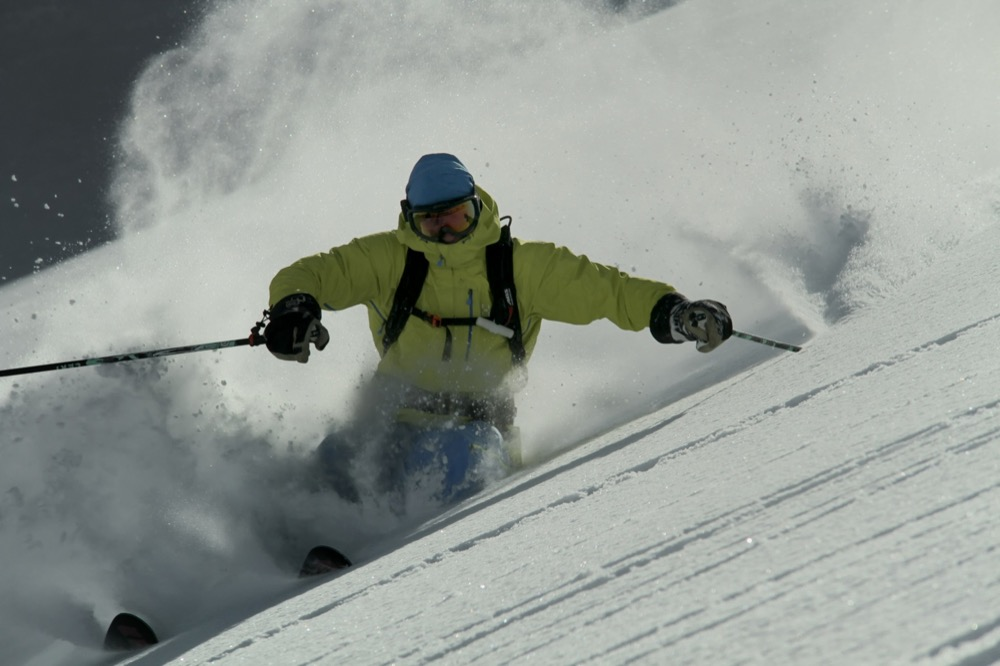
A professional ski guide in deep powder in Lech ski area in Austria.

Snowboarder freeriding with high speed at the Hintertux glacier skiing area in Austria

Freeriding is a style of skiing or snowboarding performed on natural, un-groomed terrain, without a set course, goals or rules. It evolved throughout the sport's formative years as a contrary response to the highly regimented style of ski competition prevalent at the time. Snowboarders primarily refer to freeriding as backcountry, sidecountry, or off-piste snowboarding, and sometimes big mountain or extreme riding.

Freeriding incorporates various aspects of riding into a style that adapts to the variations and challenges of natural, off-piste terrain, and eschews man-made features such as jumps, rails, half-pipes, or groomed snow. Freeriding incorporates aspects of other snowsport disciplines such as freestyle and alpine. This provides the necessary flexibility for varied natural terrain. Whereas freestyle snowboarding relies on the use of man-made terrain such as jumps, rails and half-pipes, and alpine snowboarding is done on groomed snow, freeriding utilizes the random flow of natural terrain to perform similar tricks.

Due to their use of backcountry routes, freeriders are (proportionally) much more likely to become a victim of avalanches. One estimate posits that about 80% of all avalanche deaths in the Alps occur among freeride/backcountry riders.

While the term “freeriding” originated in snowboarding, some skiers have adopted it in recent years. For many years, the skiing equivalent of freeriding was known as freeskiing and referred specifically to off-piste skiing. However over the years, especially since the arrival of snowboarding, the term "freeskiing" has come to refer to freestyle skiing. This has left traditional “freeskiers” without a name for their style of skiing, and so some now use the snowboarding term instead. This became somewhat official in 2013, when the Freeride World Tour absorbed the “Freeskiing World Tour” into its schedule of competitive events.

== Equipment ==
Freeride snowboarding has evolved a range of different snowboards to make best use of varied conditions. Originally freeride snowboards were very similar to all-mountain snowboards. However, nowadays powder-specific snowboards and backcountry snowboards are expected to be found under the 'Freeride' category.

A freeride snowboard usually has a directional shape, a set back stance and a flex pattern with a nose that is softer than the tail, this helps keep the nose out of the snow, with turn initiation and with handling poor snow conditions. Many freeride snowboards incorporate a rocker element in the nose, which is then made extra long beyond the contact points to increase float. They also typically have a wider nose and taper towards the tail again to make riding in powder easier. Some freeride snowboards have a swallow tail shape to allow the back to sink into the snow, and others have pintails which help you transfer faster from edge to edge in deep snow.

Overall a freeride snowboards are usually stiffer tip to tail and edge to edge than freestyle board to ensure a more precise and stable ride. Boots and bindings are also usually stiffer than their freestyle snowboarding counterparts.

== Competition ==
Freeride competitions basically involve negotiating steep natural terrain fluidly in a similar approach to slopestyle competitors in a terrain park. However unlike the freestyle discipline of slopestyle, there are no perfect man-made takeoffs or landings - each individual rider's route varies, and is personally plotted out in pre-run inspections. Constantly changing weather and snow conditions add an extra element to these events, and the unpredictably random aspect of freeride terrain contributes to a high risk of personal injury.

The Freeride World Tour is an annually toured series of events in which the world's best freeriders compete for individual event wins, as well as the overall title of World Champion in their respective genders and disciplines. The first event series under the Freeride World Tour moniker took place in 2008. Prior to that it was known as the Verbier Extreme, originally a snowboard only contest launched in 1996 - with skiers also invited to compete in 2004. For the 2013 season, the Freeride World Tour merged with the Freeskiing World Tour and The North Face Masters of Snowboarding, combining all three tours under one unified global championship series.

From 1995-2001 New Zealand's World Heli Challenge invited international extreme snowboarders and skiers to compete in New Zealand's Mt. Cook National Park. The helicopter-accessed competition occurred over a two-week period to allow for weather and snow conditions. In 2001, the tragedy of the 9/11 terrorist attacks interrupted international sponsorship support leading to an eight-year break. Footage from the previous years events continued to play worldwide. In 2009 the World Heli Challenge resumed and has been running annually ever since.

On July 7, 2026, the International Olympic Committee announced that freeride snowboarding and skiing would be included in the Winter Olympic Games starting with the 2030 Winter Olympics.
