= Fieberbrunn =

- Municipality
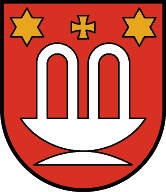
- Coat of arms

- Location within Austria
- Coordinates: 47°27′59″N 12°33′00″E
- Country: Austria
- State: Tyrol
- District: Kitzbühel

Government
  - Mayor: Dr. Walter Astner

Area
  - Total: 76.33 km^{2} (29.47 sq mi)
- Elevation: 780 m (2,560 ft)

Population (2018-01-01)
  - Total: 4,287
  - Density: 56.16/km^{2} (145.5/sq mi)
- Time zone: UTC+1 (CET)
  - Summer (DST): UTC+2 (CEST)
- Postal code: 6391
- Area code: 05354
- Vehicle registration: KB
- Website: www.fieberbrunn.tirol.gv.at

Fieberbrunn is a market town in the Austrian state of Tyrol in the Kitzbühel district. It is located at 47°28′N 12°33′E, in the Kitzbühel Alps. Fieberbrunn is the most populous municipality in the Pillerseetal valley.

According to a legend, the fountain near its church, and later also the market town received the name Fieberbrunn (fever well) when Tyrolean Countess Margarete Maultasch was healed from fever after drinking from it. Previously the market town was named Pramau.

Fieberbrunn is a winter sports resort and venue of international snowboarding events (like Lords of the Boards), as well as a hiking and mountaineering resort in summer. Since 2006 Fieberbrunn is venue of a new event called 'SNOWFEVER', which is one of the biggest Big Mountain Events in Austria. It is also home of the churchjump.

Schloss Rosenegg is nearby. The bathing lake of the Lauchsee is important for summer tourism.

== Population ==
Historical population
Year	Pop.	±%
1869	1,723	—
1880	1,788	+3.8%
1890	1,766	−1.2%
1900	1,777	+0.6%
1910	1,924	+8.3%
1923	2,288	+18.9%
1934	2,460	+7.5%
1939	2,425	−1.4%
1951	2,672	+10.2%
1961	3,010	+12.6%
1971	3,662	+21.7%
1981	3,914	+6.9%
1991	4,160	+6.3%
2001	4,180	+0.5%
2011	4,315	+3.2%
2021	4,543	+5.3%

== Gallery ==
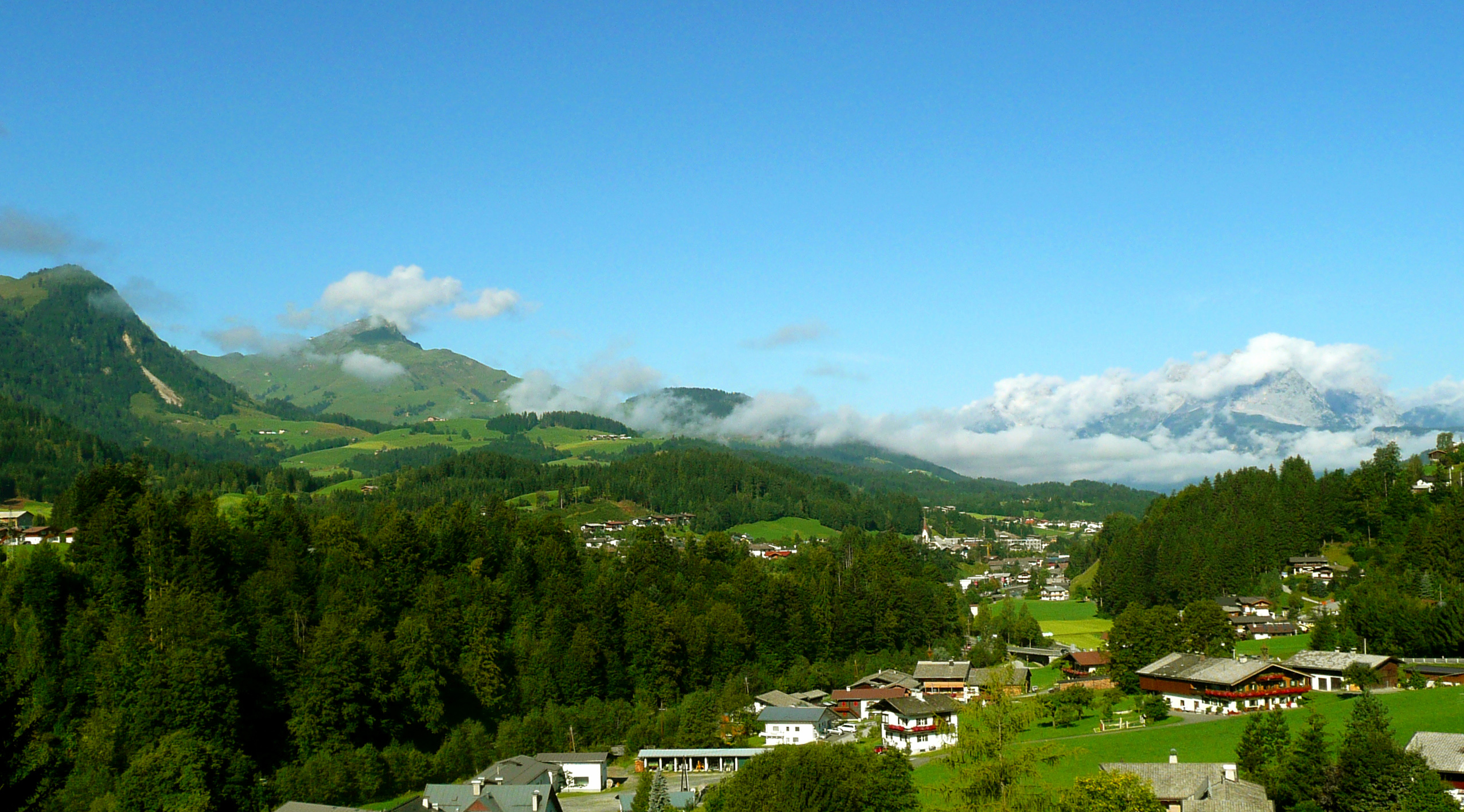
from Fieberbrunn to the west, view of Pillerseetal, the Kitzbüheler Horn (left), Wilder Kaiser in clouds (right)

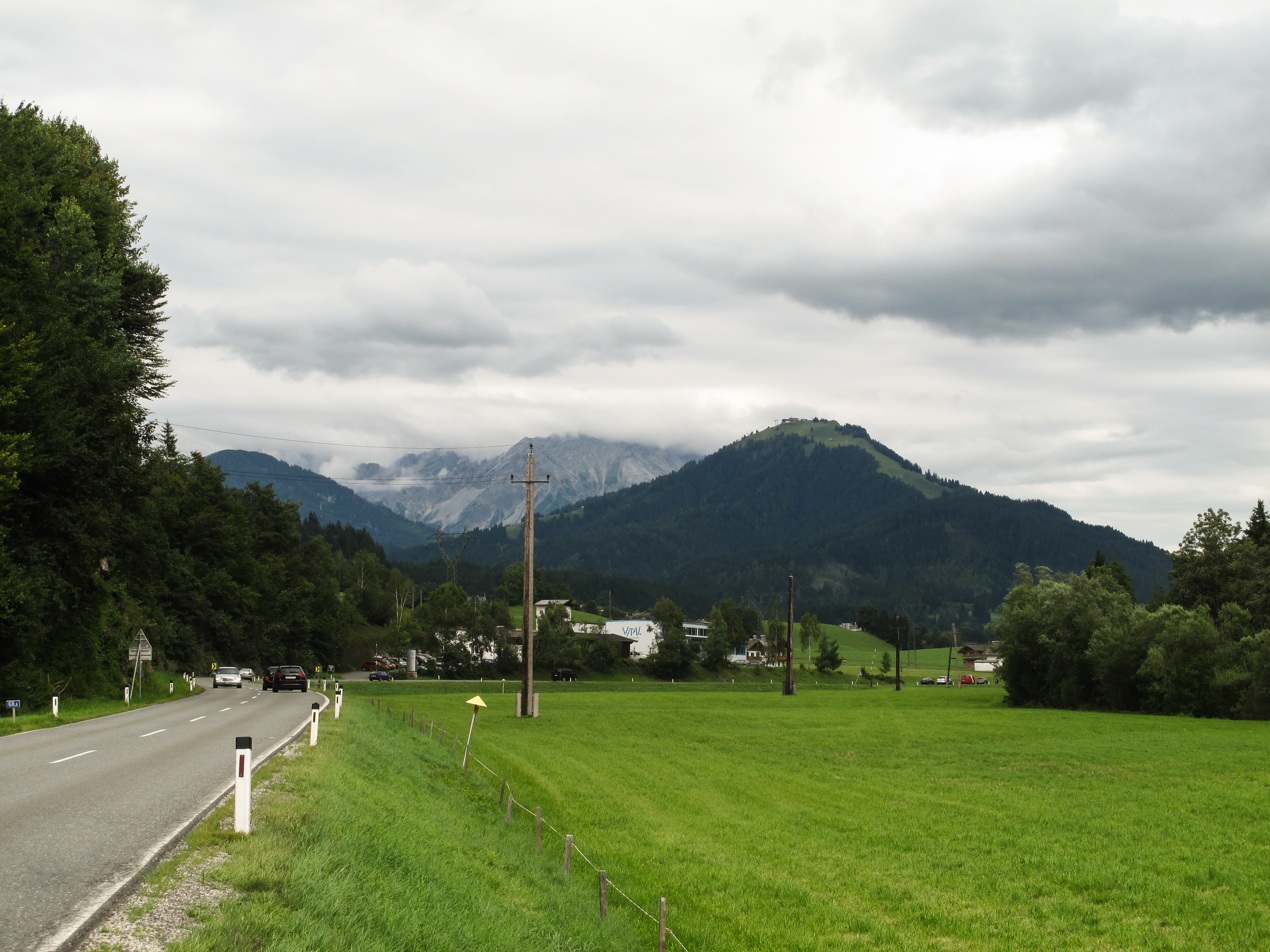
between Fieberbrunn and Sankt Johann, panorama

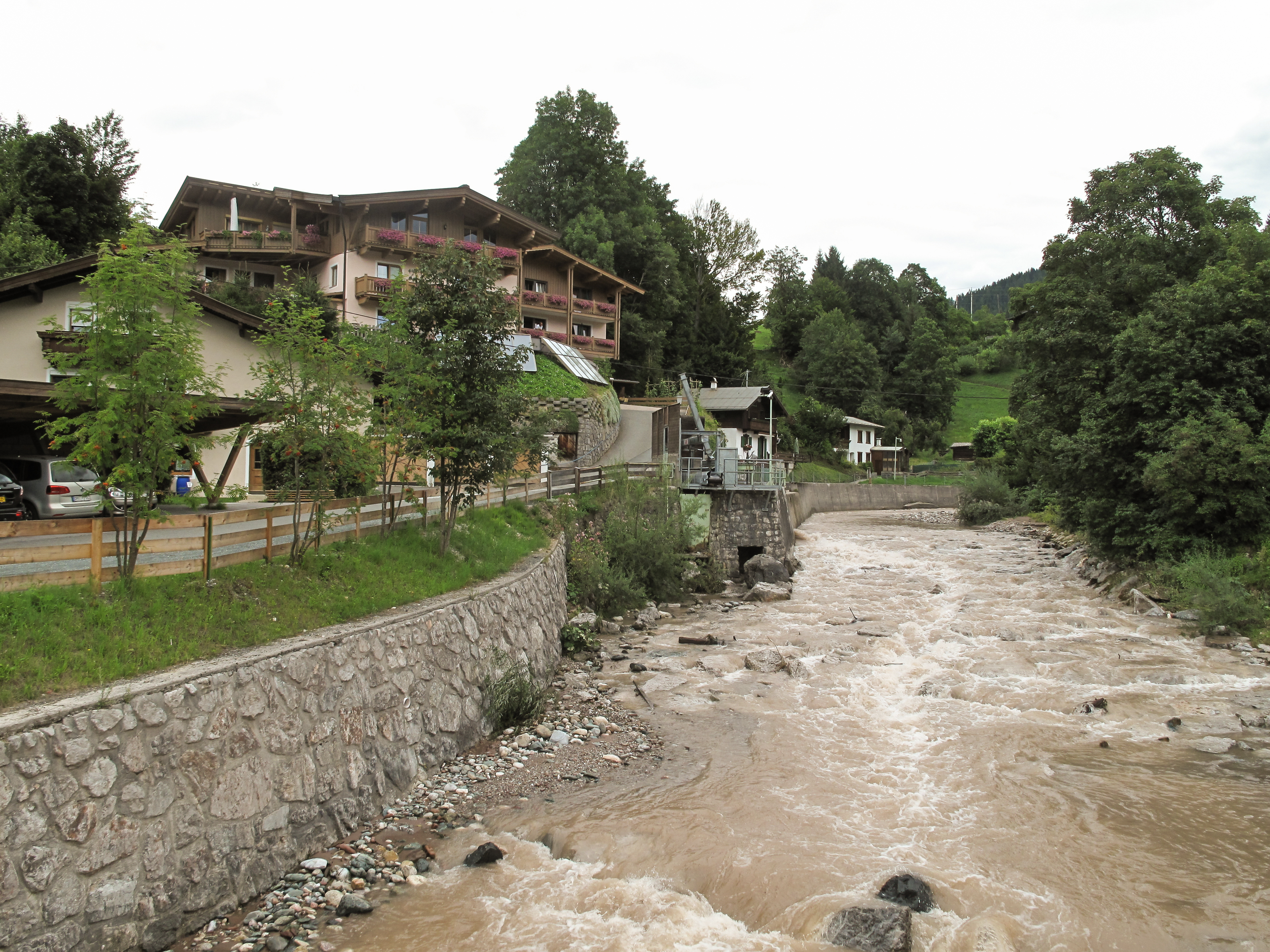
Fieberbrunn, water through the village

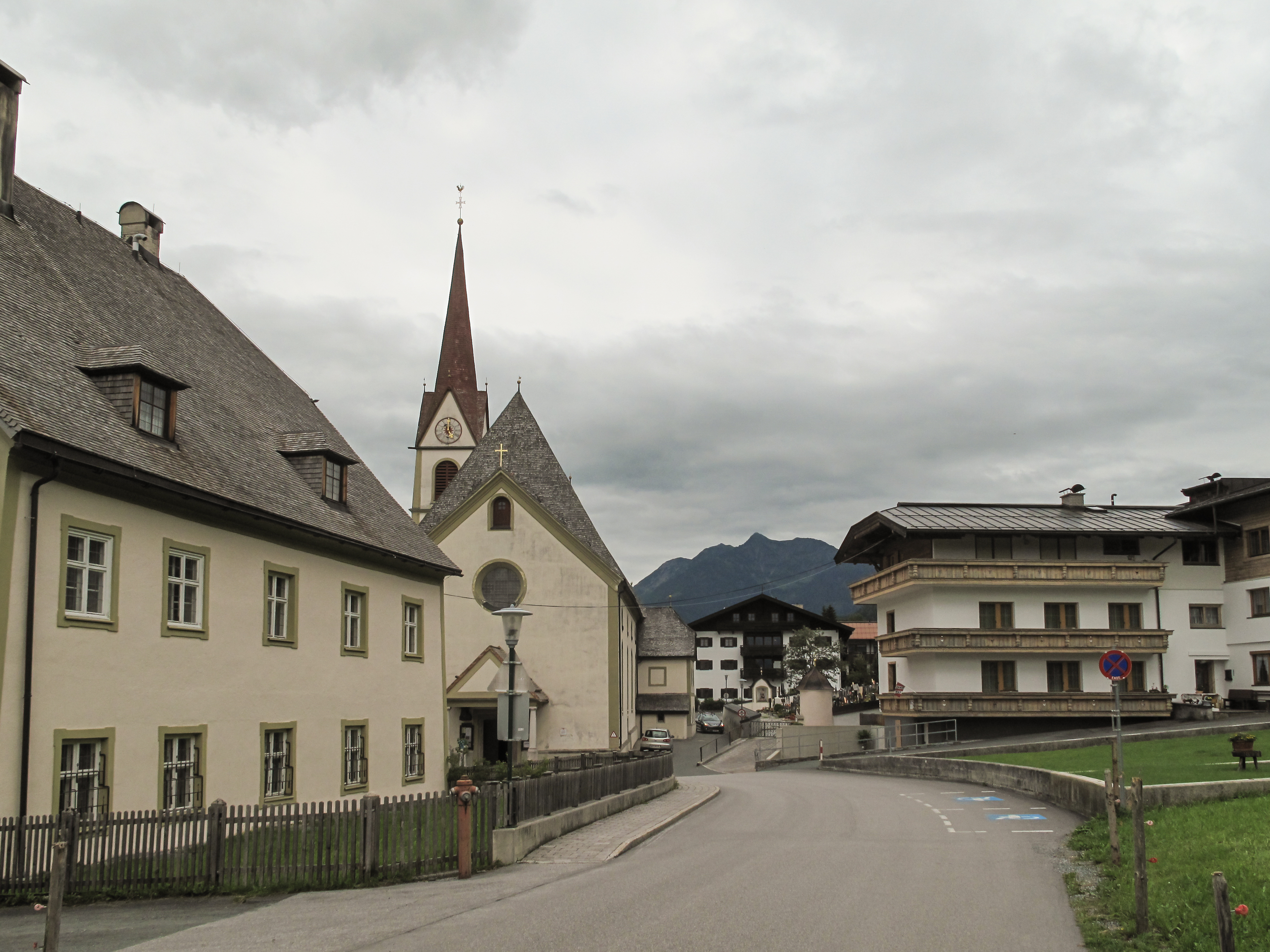
Fieberbrunn, church (Katholische Pfarrkirche) in the street
